= Mark Weinberger =

American businessman

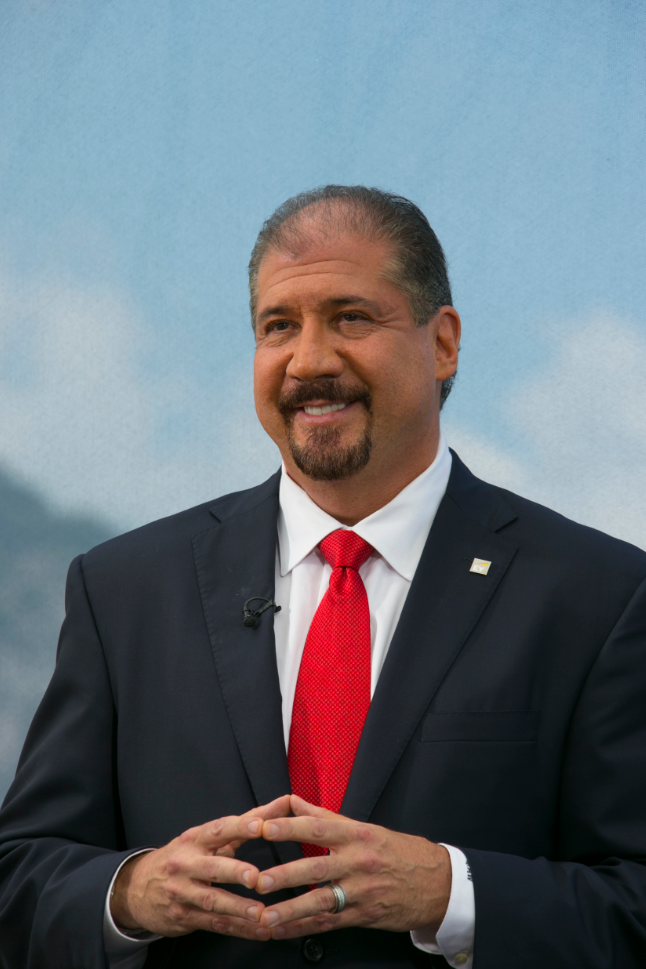
- Weinberger in 2016
- Born: 1964 or 1965 (age 61–62); Scranton, Pennsylvania, U.S.
- Education: Emory University (1983); Case Western Reserve University (1987); Georgetown University Law Center (1991)
- Occupations: former chairman and CEO of EY (2013–2019); board member of Metlife, Saudi Aramco, Johnson & Johnson, NBER; senior advisor Teneo, Stone Canyon Industries Holdings Inc., G100, World 50, JUST Capital
- Predecessor: Jim Turley
- Successor: Carmine Di Sibio
- Spouse: Nancy Lee Williams Weinberger
- Children: 4

Mark A. Weinberger (born 1964/1965) is an American businessman. He is the former global chairman and CEO of EY (formerly known as Ernst & Young). Weinberger currently sits on several boards of directors, including those of Metlife, Johnson & Johnson Saudi Aramco. and JPMorgan Chase. Earlier in his career he has also held several posts in the public sector in Washington, D.C., including time as Assistant Secretary of the Treasury for Tax Policy.

== Early life and education ==
Weinberger was born in Scranton, Pennsylvania, the son of Goldye (née Schick) and Murray Weinberger. He is Jewish. He graduated from Wyoming Seminary, a Methodist college preparatory school Kingston, Pennsylvania, in 1979. He received a Bachelor of Arts from Emory University in Atlanta, Georgia in 1983. In 1987, he earned a Master of Business Administration and Juris Doctor from Case Western Reserve University in Cleveland, Ohio, followed by a Master of Law from Georgetown University Law Center in Washington, D.C. in 1991.

== Career ==
Following his studies at Case Western Reserve University, Weinberger joined EY's tax department in 1987. He later moved from the private sector to the public sector, becoming tax counsel for Sen. John C. Danforth, a Republican from Missouri. He maintained that post through the early 1990s before becoming chief of staff for the 1994 Entitlement and Tax Reform Committee, which had considered raising the retirement age for Social Security recipients, increasing premiums for Medicare and restricting tax deductions for interest on home mortgages.

Weinberger co-founded Washington Counsel, P.C., in 1996. EY acquired the firm in May 2000, which was renamed Washington Council Ernst & Young. From then until February 2001 Weinberger ran EY's national tax department.

Two consecutive U.S. presidents chose Weinberger for positions that returned him to the public sector. In 2000, President Bill Clinton appointed Weinberger to the Social Security Advisory Board. Weinberger later left EY's national tax department, in February 2001, to serve as President George W. Bush's Assistant Secretary of the Treasury for Tax Policy. Weinberger returned to EY from the United States Treasury Department in April 2002. Weinberger also served President Obama on his Infrastructure task force.

EY announced, in January 2012, that Weinberger would succeed retiring CEO Jim Turley by taking on the role of global chairman and CEO in July 2013.

AT&T chairman and CEO Randall Stephenson named Weinberger chairman of the Business Roundtable's tax and fiscal policy committee in December 2014. He served on the 2016-2019 executive committee.

As president-elect, Donald Trump invited Weinberger and 15 other chief executives to join the President's Strategic and Policy Forum in December 2016, tasked with helping Trump establish an agenda that benefits the business community. In January 2019, EY announced that Carmine Di Sibio would succeed Weinberger, effective 1 July 2019.

Following EY, Weinberger joined the board of directors of several corporations, including MetLife, Johnson & Johnson and Saudi Aramco. Weinberger serves as senior advisor FCLT, G100, World 50m and Just Capital . Weinberger is also a member of the boards of directors for the National Bureau of Economic Research, Catalyst, American Council for Capital Formation, The Tax Council and The Bullis School; and the boards of trustees for Emory University and Case Western Reserve University. Weinberger co-chaired the Russia Foreign Investment Advisory Council with Prime Minister Dmitry Medvedev. He chairs the Mayor of Shanghai's International Business Leaders Advisory Council (IBLAC).

Weinberger has advocated for tax reform and women in the workplace. He has advocated for increased paid family leave, including paternity leave, and EY has extended its policy from 12 to 16 weeks, and finding the right balance between fatherhood and work. In June 2017, Weinberger and Lady Lynn Forester de Rothschild, announced that they were assembling CEOs from global companies, including Indra Nooyi, Paul Polman and Jamie Dimon, to work on a proof of concept to encourage and measure companies long-term value creation through human, physical, financial and intellectual capital deployment. Weinberger has spoken at the Milken Institute, World Economic Forum in Davos, Switzerland, and Aspen Ideas Festival. He has appeared on news programs, including those on CNBC, Fox Business and Bloomberg, offering commentary on business and the economy. He has been interviewed by The Wall Street Journal and his writing has appeared in Financial Times and The Huffington Post, among others.

== Honors and recognition ==
The Anti-Defamation League presented Weinberger with its Achievement Award in December 2012. In September 2015, Weinberger delivered the Robert S. Hatfield Fellow in Economic Education lecture at Cornell University. In the same year, he received the Tax Council Policy Institute's Pillar of Excellence Award. His alma mater, Weatherhead School of Management at Case Western Reserve University honored Weinberger with the Braden Award in 2017. In November 2018, he was awarded the Tax Foundation's Distinguished Service Award . Weinberger has an honorary doctorate from the Kogod School of Business at American University in Washington DC .

In 2016, Weinberger was named among the best bosses in the UK, as voted for by their employees, with a 91 percent approval rating. From 2015 to 2019, Weinberger has been constantly ranked on Glassdoor's Highest Rated CEOs list.

== Personal life ==
Weinberger and his wife, Nancy Lee (née Williams), have four children. He lives in Potomac, Maryland.
