= John Gottschalk =

American businessman (1943–2024)

33rd National President of Boy Scouts of America
- In office 2008–2010
- Preceded by: Rick Cronk
- Succeeded by: Rex Tillerson

CEO of the Omaha World-Herald
- In office 1989–2008

Personal details
- Born: John Edmund Gottschalk; 1943 Omaha, Nebraska, U.S.
- Died: November 3, 2024 (aged 81) Omaha, Nebraska, U.S.

John E. Gottschalk (/ˈɡɒtʃɔːk/ GOTCH-awk; 1943 – November 3, 2024) was an American business executive who served as the national president of the Boy Scouts of America from 2008 to 2010. He was previously the chief executive officer and publisher of the Omaha World-Herald.

== Early life ==
Gottschalk grew up in Rushville, Nebraska. He was a Boy Scout from 1951 until 1958, earning the rank of Life Scout. His grandfather, Bill Barnes, founded the weekly newspaper Sheridan County Star. Gottschalk's father became owner and publisher of the Star, where John Gottschalk also worked. He attended the University of Nebraska and majored in political science and journalism.

Gottschalk then purchased the Sidney Telegraph. He was the mayor of Sidney, Nebraska, from 1972 to 1975.

== World-Herald ==
Gottschalk sold the Telegraph in 1974 and began working for the World-Herald in 1975 as an assistant to the president. He became a vice president and board member in 1980, president in 1985 and CEO and publisher in 1989.

During Gottschalk's tenure, the World-Herald Corporation expanded to include four daily newspapers, 21 weekly community newspapers, direct marketing and product fulfillment companies and minority ownership in the largest election-services company. The newspaper's Freedom Center production facility was named in his honor upon its opening in August 2001.

Gottschalk retired as CEO and publisher of the World-Herald on January 1, 2008 but remained the corporate chairman.

== Scouting ==
Gottschalk was active in the Boy Scouts of America, and received the Silver Beaver Award, Silver Antelope Award and the James E. West Award. He was also a member of the 1910 Society and the Founders Circle. He received the national Silver Buffalo Award in 2002. He served as the chairman for the Mid-America Council from 1994 to 1995, the president of the Central Region, the national chairman for the 2001 National Scout Jamboree and the national executive vice president of the BSA from 2006 to 2008. Gottschalk was selected as the national president of the BSA on May 23, 2008. He was a member of the National Executive Board of the Boy Scouts of America, the organization's governing body.

== Personal life and death ==
Gottschalk's wife was named Carmen. The couple received the Woodrow Wilson Foundation National Distinguished Public Service Award in 2007.

Gottschalk died in Omaha on November 3, 2024, at the age of 81.

Boy Scouts of America
Preceded by Rick Cronk	National president 2008–2010	Succeeded by Rex Tillerson
