= John Cushman =

John Cushman may refer to:

- John P. Cushman (1784–1848), American lawyer and politician from New York
- John H. Cushman (1921–2017), U.S. Army general
- John C. Cushman III, American realtor
