= Truncale =

Truncale is a surname. Notable people with the surname include:

- Janet Truncale (born 1970), American business executive
- Michael J. Truncale (born 1957), American judge
