= Walter Head =

Walter Head may refer to:

- Walter Woods (politician), born Walter Head, Australian politician
- Walter W. Head, American banker and insurance executive
