= John Clendenin =

John Clendenin may refer to:

- John J. Clendenin (1813–1876), justice of the Arkansas Supreme Court
- John L. Clendenin (born 1934), chairman of The Home Depot
