= National Executive Board of Scouting America =

Governing body of Scouting America

National Executive Board
- Owner: Scouting America
- Created: November 28, 1911

The National Executive Board is the governing body of Scouting America. The role of the board is outlined in the organization’s congressional charter. There are currently 45 board members.

The board is led by the National Chair, an elected volunteer. Organization bylaws permit between 40 and 48 members which includes regular elected members, regional presidents, and up to five appointed youth members. The Chief Scout Executive is the board secretary and non-voting member. The National Executive Board has a number of standing committees that correspond to the professional staff of the National Council.

== Establishment in statute ==
The statute authorizing the federal charter (36 USC 309) to the BSA provides that "An executive board composed of citizens of the United States is the governing body of the corporation. The number, qualifications, and term of office of members of the board are as provided in the bylaws. A vacancy on the board shall be filled by a majority vote of the remaining members of the board." The executive board is also required to hold annual meetings and to submit annual reports to the US Congress.

== Membership ==
Bylaws provide that membership will include:

- Up to 64 regular members, elected annually at annual National Council meetings.
- Regional presidents; currently there are four BSA regions: —Western, Central, Southern and Northeast.
- 5 ex officio voting members: The chairman of the Advisory Council, the President of the National Eagle Scout Association, the Chairman of the Order of the Arrow Committee, a designated representative of the Board of the National Boy Scouts of America Foundation, and the Chairman of Learning for Life, the immediate past chair
- Up to 5 youth members, appointed by the National Chair

== Current and former members ==
Members of the National Executive Board are

National Executive Board of Scouting America
Name	Occupation	Home
Glenn Adams	President, CEO & Managing Director Stonetex Oil Corp.	Fort Worth, TX
David Alexander	Managing Member Caljet	Phoenix, AZ
Bray Barnes	Director, Global Security Innovative Strategies	Toms River, NJ
Scott Beckett	Partner, New Vista Global Leadership	Charlotte, NC
Reuben Brigety, II	President, Busara Advisors	McLean, VA
Laurie Champion	Managing Director, Marsh & McLennan Companies	Saline, MI
Gary Crum	Retired Bank President	Laramie, WY
Kaleen Deatherage	Management Consultant	Portland, OR
William Derrough	Managing Director and Global Head of Capital Structure Advisory, Moelis & Company	New York, NY
Devang Desai	Partner, Freeman Mathis & Gary, LLP Law Offices	Coral Gables, FL
Gordon Gee	President, West Virginia University	Morgantown, WV
Frederick Grimm	CEO and Co-Founder, Triad Development Inc.	Seattle, WA
Jennifer Hancock	Attorney	Kyle, TX
Anne-Marie Lamarche	Strategy Consultant, Lamarche & Associates	Kenwood, CA
Vincent La Padula	CEO, Workplace Wealth Solutions	Greenwich, CT
Ricky Mason	Partner, Restructuring and Finance, Wachtell, Lipton, Rosen & Katz	Hoboken, NJ
Andrew Miller	Management Consultant at MW Jones	Boulder, CO
Dave Moody	Owner, CD Moody Construction Co.	Lithonia, GA
Ellie Morrison		Waco, TX
Jose Nino	President, El Nino Group Ltd.	Montgomery Village, MD
R. Doyle Parrish	CEO, Summit Hospitality Group, LTD	Raleigh, NC
Lou Paulson	Director, CA Public Employment Relations	Walnut Creek, CA
Jeanette Prenger	President & CEO, ECCO Select	Kansas City, MO
Jacob Pruitt	President, Fidelity Charitable	Colorado Springs, CO
Frank Ramirez	CEO, Water Harvesting, Inc.	Fort Collins, CO
Tico Perez	Founding Principal, Mas Communications; Shareholder, Gunster Law Firm	Orlando, FL
Jim Rogers	Retired President & CEO, Kampgrounds of America	Reno, NV
Nathan Rosenberg	Partner, Insigniam Consulting	Laguna Beach, CA
Bill Rosner	Retired Chief Human Resource Officer, PNC Financial Corp.	Orlando, FL
Jim Ryffel	President, Woodcrest Capital	Fort Worth, TX
Alison Schuler	Retired Attorney, Schuler.Daly	Albuquerque, NM
David Scott	President & CEO, Tetrad Corporation	Omaha, NE
Michael Sears	Director of Leadership Innovation, Boeing Leadership Innovation Laboratory, U.S. Naval Academy	Annapolis, MD
Max Siegel	CEO, USA Track & Field	Indianapolis, IN
Larry Simkins	Director, Atlas Corp; Former President & CEO, The Washington Companies	Missoula, MT
Wesley Smith	Retired COO and director, Del Monte Foods Co.	Piedmont, CA
Scott Sorrels	Of Counsel, Eversheds-Sutherland, LLP	Alpharetta, GA
Brad Tilden	Retired Chairman & CEO, Alaska Air Group	Seattle, WA
Frank Tsuru	CEO, Momentum Midstream, LLC	Houston, TX
Daniel Van Horn	Member, Butler Snow LLP	Memphis, TN
Dale Werts	Partner, Lathrop GPM LLP	Edgerton, MO
Degas Wright	Founder and Principal, Decatur Capital Management	Decatur, GA
Willy Xiao	Software Engineering Leader	Brooklyn, NY
Tom Yarboro	Executive, Goldsboro Milling Company	Goldsboro, NC

Emeritus Board Members (Former National Presidents or Chairs of Scouting America)
Name	Occupation	Home
Rick Cronk	Former President of Dreyer’s Grand Ice Cream, Inc.	Lafayette, CA
Robert Gates	Former Secretary of Defense; Former Director of the CIA; Former President of Texas A&M University	Sedro Woolley, WA
Dan Ownby	President, West Shore Pipe Line Company	Houston, TX
Wayne Perry	Chairman, Shotgun Creek Investments, LLC	Provo, UT
Randall Stephenson	Former Chairman & CEO of AT&T Inc.	Dallas, TX
Rex Tillerson	Former US Secretary of State; Former Chairman & CEO, Exxon Mobil	Roanoke, TX
Jim Turley	Retired Chairman & CEO, Ernst & Young	St. Louis, MO

Former members of the NEB include former presidential nominee Mitt Romney and late LDS Church President Thomas S. Monson.

== Executive committee ==
Per the by-laws, the executive committee is:

- the chair
- the immediate past chair
- the executive vice-president and the vice-presidents.
- the regional presidents (Central, Western, North-East, and Southern)
- the International Commissioner
- the National Commissioner
- the treasurer
- the assistant treasurers
- the chairman of the Advisory Council
- the Chief Scout Executive

== Annual meetings ==
The board is required to hold annual meetings. The annual meeting is held at a different location every May. These meetings include the election of the new National Executive Board, and when applicable installation of new National Chair, National Commissioner, and Chief Scout Executive.

During this meeting, the National Council presents all National and Regional level awards, including the Silver Buffalo, and Silver Antelope.

List of Annual Meetings (also abbreviated as NAM (National Annual Meetings))
Anniversary	Year	City	State
Organizing	1910	Washington	DC
1	1911	Washington	DC
2	1912	New York	NY
3	1913		
4	1914	Washington	DC
5	1915		
6	1916		
7	1917		
8	1918		
9	1919		
10	1920		
11	1921		
12	1922	Chicago	IL
13	1923		
14	1924	St. Louis	MO
15	1925	New York	NY
16	1926	Washington	DC
17	1927	New York	NY
18	1928	San Francisco	CA
19	1929		
20	1930	Salt Lake City	UT
21	1931	Memphis	TN
22	1932		
23	1933	Kansas City	MO
24	1934	Buffalo	NY
25	1935		
26	1936	Atlantic City	NJ
27	1937		
28	1938	Cleveland	OH
29	1939	New York	NY
30	1940		
31	1941	Washington	DC
32	1942	Minneapolis-St. Paul	MN
33	1943	New York	NY
34	1944		
35	1945		
36	1946		
37	1947	New York	NY
38	1948	Seattle	WA
39	1949	Boston	MA
40	1950	Philadelphia	PA
41	1951	Chicago	IL
42	1952	New York	NY
43	1953	Los Angeles	CA
44	1954	Washington	DC
45	1955	St. Louis	MO
46	1956	Cincinnati	OH
47	1957	Philadelphia	PA
48	1958	Chicago	IL
49	1959	San Francisco	CA
50	1960	Washington	DC
51	1961	Detroit	MI
52	1962	Portland	OR
53	1963	New York	NY
54	1964	Cleveland	OH
55	1965	Bal Harbour	FL
56	1966	Dallas	TX
57	1967	Pittsburgh	PA
58	1968	Chicago	IL
59	1969	Boston	MA
60	1970	Denver	CO
61	1971	Atlanta	GA
62	1972	Los Angeles	CA
63	1973	Minneapolis	MN
64	1974	Honolulu	HI
65	1975	none	
66	1976	New York	NY
67	1977	none	
68	1978	Phoenix	AZ
69	1979	none	
70	1980	New Orleans	LA
71	1981	none	
72	1982	Atlanta	GA
73	1983	none	
74	1984	Salt Lake City	UT
75	1985	none	
76	1986	Louisville	KY
77	1987	none	
78	1988	San Diego	CA
79	1989	none	
80	1990	Baltimore	MD
81	1991	none	
82	1992	Cincinnati	OH
83	1993	St. Louis	MO
84	1994	Nashville	TN
85	1995	Chicago	IL
86	1996	Honolulu	HI
87	1997	Orlando	FL
88	1998	San Antonio	TX
89	1999	San Diego	CA
90	2000	Nashville	TN
91	2001	Boston	MA
92	2002	New Orleans	LA
93	2003	Philadelphia	PA
94	2004	Chicago	IL
95	2005	Grapevine	TX
96	2006	Washington	DC
97	2007	Atlanta	GA
98	2008	San Diego	CA
99	2009	Orlando	FL
100	2010	Dallas	TX
101	2011	San Diego	CA
102	2012	Orlando	FL
103	2013	Grapevine	TX
104	2014	Nashville	TN
105	2015	Atlanta	GA
106	2016	San Diego	CA
107	2017	Orlando	FL
108	2018	Dallas	TX
109	2019	Denver	CO
110	2020	Virtual COVID	
111	2021	Virtual COVID	
112	2022	Virtual – Postponed due to Bankruptcy	
113	2023	Atlanta	GA
114	2024		
115	2025		
116	2026	Dallas	TX
