= Carmine Di Sibio =

Italian-born American business executive

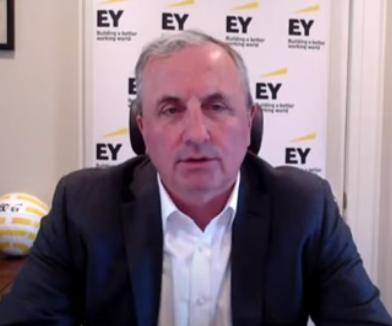
- Speaking at the 2021 World Economic Forum
- Born: March 23, 1963 (age 63); Frigento, Italy
- Education: Colgate University (BA); New York University (MBA)
- Occupations: Global Chairman and CEO of EY
- Predecessor: Mark Weinberger
- Successor: Janet Truncale
- Spouse: Amy Di Sibio (m. 1989)
- Children: 4

Carmine Di Sibio (born March 23, 1963) is an Italian-born American business executive. He was the Global Chairman and CEO of EY, formerly known as Ernst & Young, until July 2024.

He explored a potential break up attempt of EY, known as Project Everest, naming himself the CEO of the future public company for consulting services which was ultimately not pursued. Prior to being elected to his current post, Di Sibio was Global Managing Partner for Client Service at EY.

== Early life and education ==
Carmine Di Sibio was born in the town of Frigento in the Province of Avellino in Campania, Italy. Together with his family, Di Sibio emigrated to the United States from Italy as a three-year-old child and grew up in Glen Cove, New York. A first-generation college student, Di Sibio received a bachelor's degree in Chemistry from Colgate University and an MBA from New York University Stern School of Business. His career foundation is in audit, practicing as a certified public accountant (CPA).

== Career ==
Di Sibio joined EY in 1985 as an auditor. Since joining he has worked in advisory and assurance roles with many of the firm's largest financial services clients. He was the chair of the EY Global Financial Services Markets Executive and regional managing partner for the Americas Financial Services Organization, where he started EY Risk Management and Regulatory Services. Among his past positions at EY include Americas banking and capital markets leader (2001–2003); assurance and advisory managing partner – financial services (2003–2006); financial services managing partner - Americas, vice chair - Americas executive board (2006–2013); chair of the Global Financial Services Markets Executive (2011–2013). From July 2013 to June 2019, he served as the global managing partner for client service, responsible for driving growth relationship building and innovation as well as the execution of the organization's global strategy, covering four geographical areas - the Americas, EMEIA, Asia-Pacific and Japan), and four primary service divisions – tax, advisory, assurance, and transaction advisory services.

He led the operationalization of a US$1 billion investment in new technology solutions over a two-year time frame. He was instrumental in the creation of the Global Innovation team to redefine how EY uses technology to both transform existing services and create new solutions. He served as a co-chair of EY's Global Diversity and Inclusiveness Steering Committee.

=== Chairman and CEO ===
Di Sibio was elected global chairman and CEO-elect for a four-year term on 17 January 2019 and assumed the role of global chairman and CEO of EY on 1 July 2019, succeeding Mark Weinberger who served for six years. In accepting his new role as EY's chief executive, Di Sibio remarked, "I am honored to be chosen to lead this great organization, which I have been part of for over 33 years." In June 2023, he announced his intention to retire in 2024. After Di Sibio retired from EY in June 2024, PayPal appointed him to its board of directors as an independent director.

== Philanthropy ==
Di Sibio is on the board of Foundation for Empowering Citizens with Autism and Family Promise, as well as being a member of the Board of Trustees of Colgate University.

== Personal life ==
Carmine Di Sibio is married and has four children. He lives in New Jersey in the US. Di Sibio is a sports aficionado.
