= Character.org =

Non-profit organization

- Formation: 1993
- Founder: Sanford N. McDonnell
- Type: Non-governmental
- Tax ID no.: 54-1657505
- Legal status: Non-profit
- Location: Washington D.C.
- Services: Consulting, workshops, training, evaluation
- Fields: Character education, character development
- Key people: Arthur Schwartz, President
- Volunteers: 100+
- Website: www.character.org
- Formerly called: Character Education Partnership

Character.org is a non-profit organization formerly known as the Character Education Partnership, which was founded in the year 1993 in order to encourage people of all ages to practice good ethical values. Today, Character.org creates and shares resources that support people around the globe, including their 11 Principles Framework for Schools: A Guide to Cultivating a Culture of Character.

It is a "nonprofit, nonpartisan, nonsectarian, coalition of organizations and individuals committed to fostering effective character education in our nation's K-12 schools." Character.org's mission is "Leading the nation in helping schools develop people of good character for a just and compassionate society." A commentary in the November 14, 2007 edition of Education Week stated that "Just about anything can be called character education these days", whereas "Schools serious about helping students form good character rely heavily on Character.org's 11 Principles of Effective Character Education."

Through its National Schools of Character Awards program, Character.org recognizes public and private schools and districts schools (K-12) as National Schools of Character for their outstanding achievements in character education. Winning schools and districts receive a grant, which they are required to use both to continue their character education program and to conduct outreach to other schools working to implement quality character education.

States offering character education programs have worked together with Character.org to establish new programs and to recognize achievements in the area, with New Jersey's Governor noting the organization's efforts to help "young people to learn honesty, respect and responsibility". In September 2007, the Massachusetts Department of Education announced that it was working with the Partnership to recognize "outstanding work in character education".
