= John L. Clendenin =

American business executive (1934–2020)

John Clendenin
- Born: May 8, 1934; El Paso, Texas, U.S.
- Died: February 25, 2020 (aged 85)
- Occupation: Business executive
- Political party: Republican

John L. Clendenin (May 8, 1934 – February 25, 2020) was an American businessman who was the chairman of The Home Depot. He was also a director of the company Powerwave Technologies, which ceased operations in 2013. In 2009, Powerwave Technologies paid Clendenin a total director compensation of $93,989. On October 29, 2012, Clendenin notified the Board of Directors of Powerwave that he is retiring from the Board of the Company effective December 17, 2012.

Clendenin died on February 25, 2020, at the age of 85.

== Awards ==
In 1992, Clendenin was awarded the Silver Buffalo Award of the Boy Scouts of America. He served as National President of the Boy Scouts of America between 1992 and 1994.

In 2004, Clendenin won the Outstanding Directors Program Award as a director and Chairman of Home Depot, Inc.

Boy Scouts of America
Preceded by Richard H. Leet	National president 1992 - 1994	Succeeded by Norman Ralph Augustine
