= Thomas C. MacAvoy =

American Scouting leader (1928–2015)

Thomas C. MacAvoy (April 24, 1928 – May 28, 2015) served as the president of the Boy Scouts of America from 1980 to 1982.

== Background ==
In 1988, MacAvoy was awarded the 192nd Bronze Wolf, the only distinction of the World Organization of the Scout Movement, awarded by the World Scout Committee for exceptional services to world Scouting. He was one of only six men to hold all four top-tier Scouting awards, the Bronze Wolf, the Silver Buffalo, the Silver Antelope, and the Distinguished Eagle Scout Award.

Boy Scouts of America
| Preceded by Downing B. Jenks | National president 1980–1982 | Succeeded by Edward C. Joullian III |
