= National Chair of Scouting America =

National Chair
- Owner: Scouting America
- Created: February 8, 1910
- Incumbent: Brad Tilden

The National Chair is the presiding officer of the National Executive Board of Scouting America, the governing body of the organization. The office holder is a volunteer elected by the members of the board. Along with the Chief Scout Executive and National Commissioner, the National Chair is a member of the organization’s “Key 3”.

Prior to 2018, the role of National Chair was titled National President.

== List ==
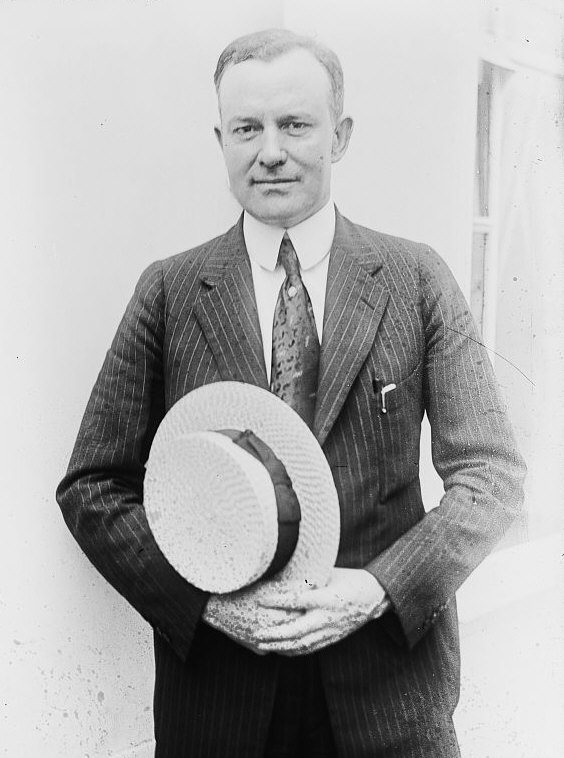
Walter W. Head

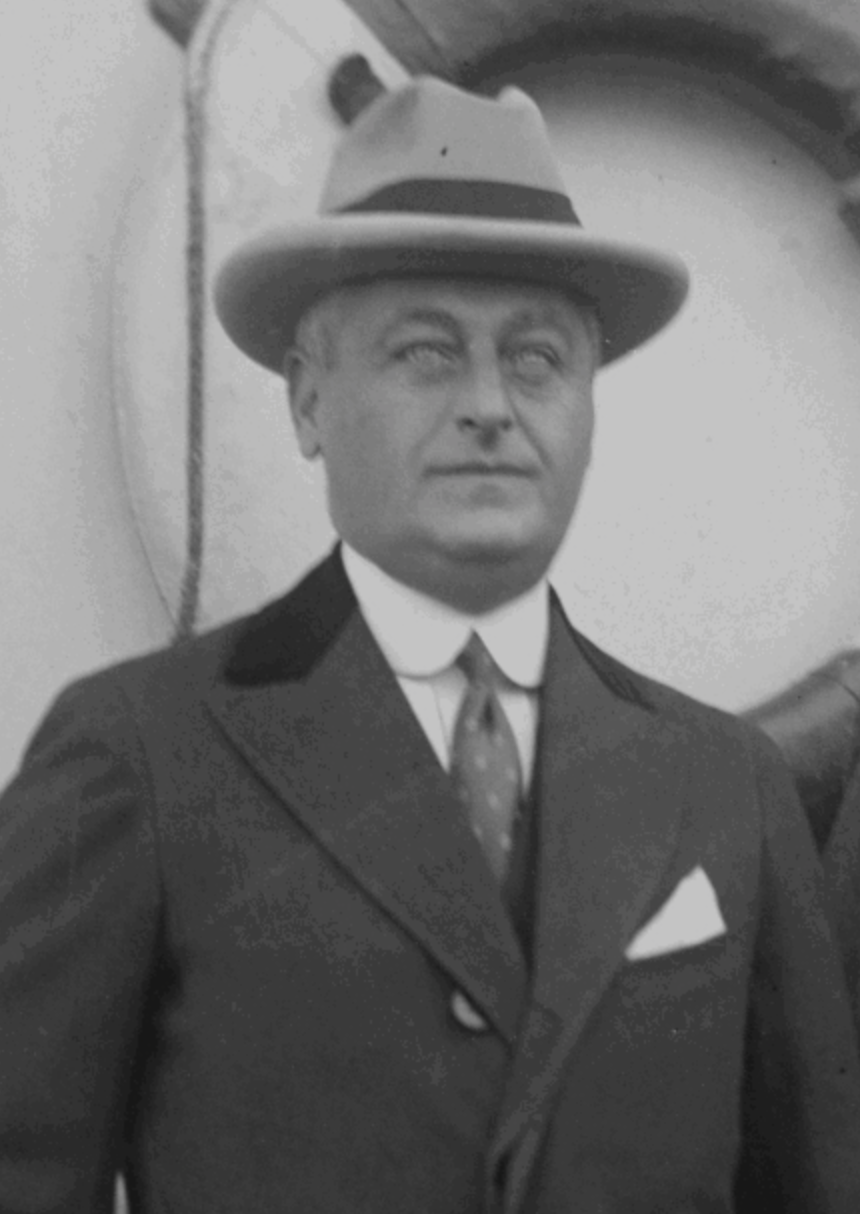
Mortimer L. Schiff

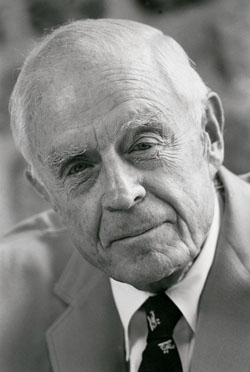
Thomas J. Watson

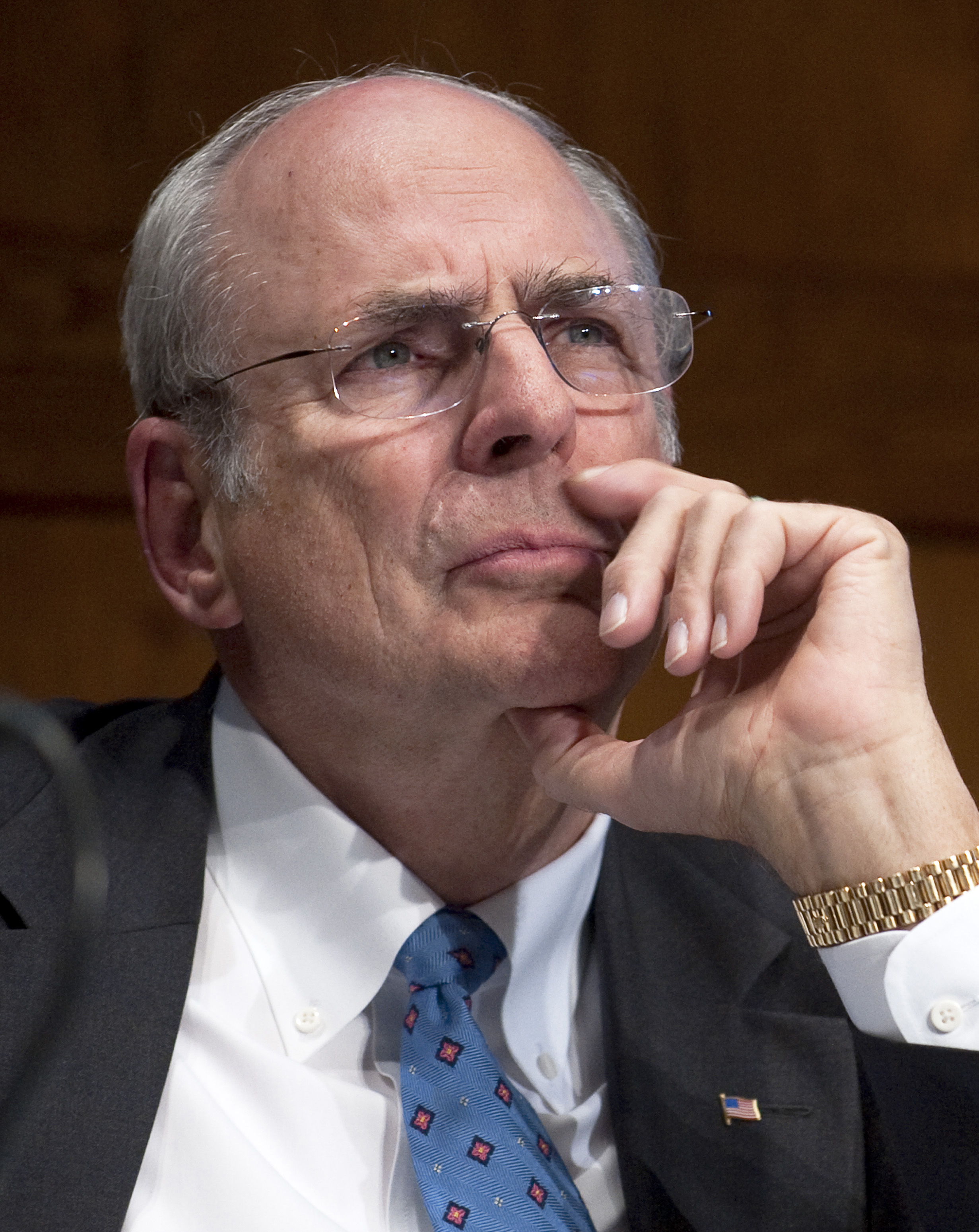
Norman R. Augustine

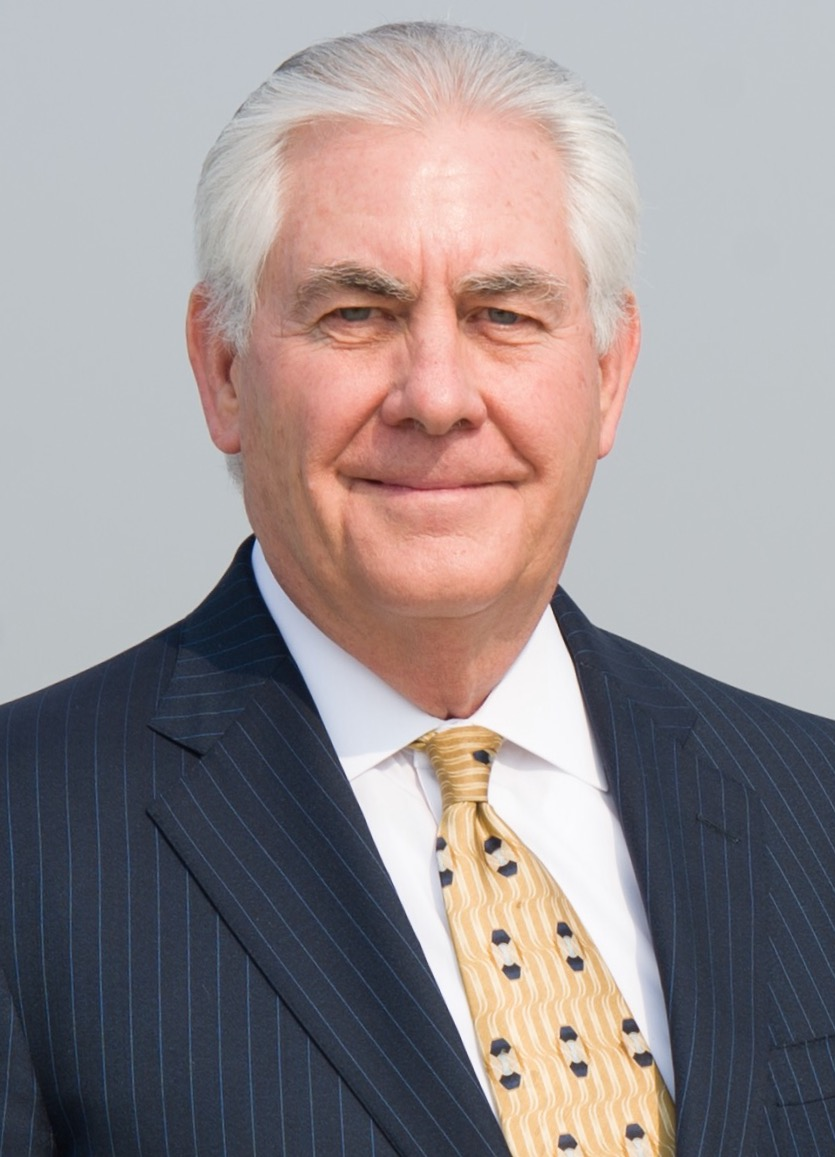
Rex Tillerson

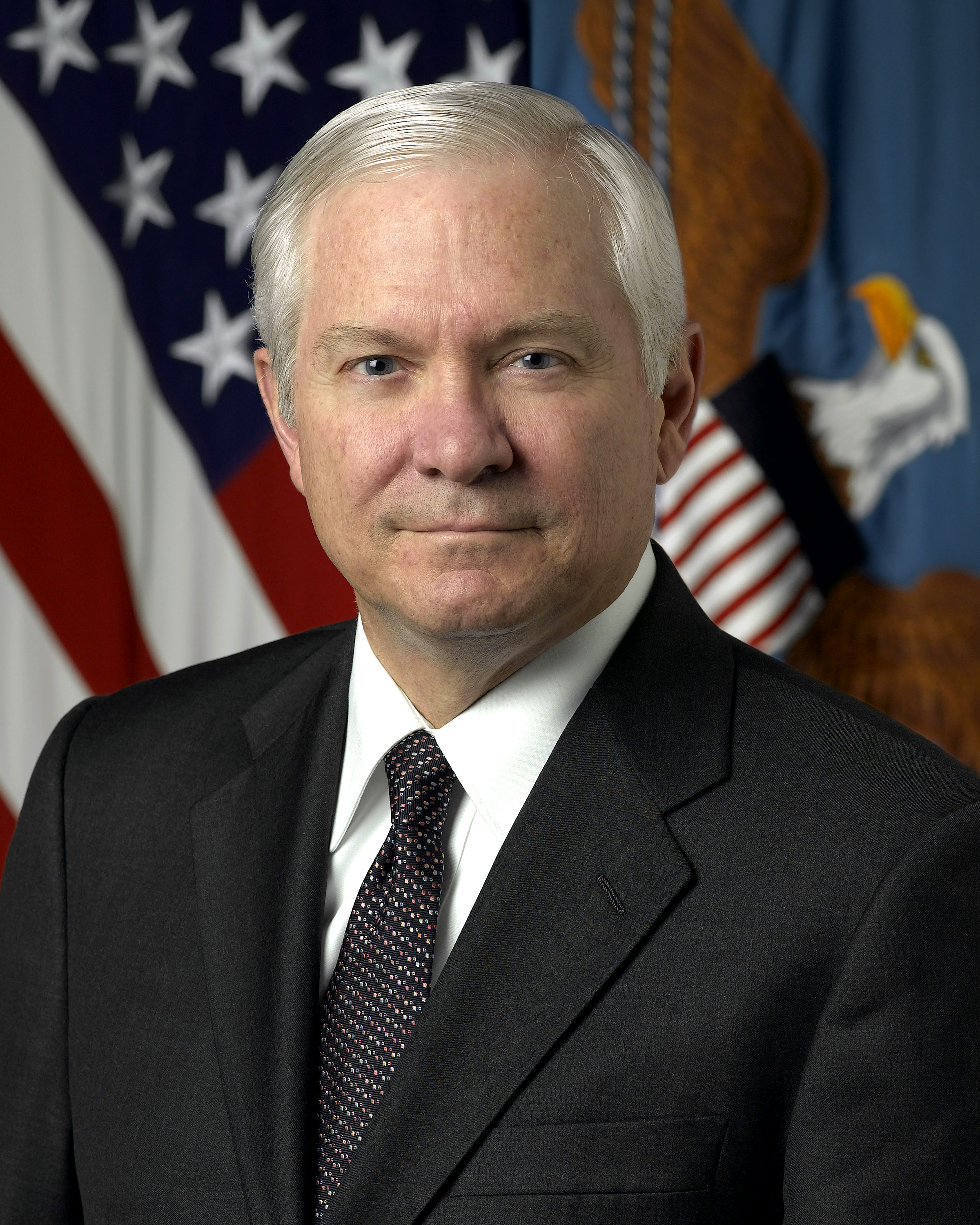
Robert Gates

Term	President
1910–1925	Colin H. Livingstone
1925–1926	James J. Storrow (died in office)
1926 (March–May)	Milton A. McRae
1926–1931	Walter W. Head
1931	Mortimer L. Schiff (died in office)
1931–1946	Walter W. Head
1946–1951	Amory Houghton
1951–1956	John Mortimer Schiff
1956–1959	Kenneth K. Bechtel
1959–1964	Ellsworth Hunt Augustus
1964–1968	Thomas J. Watson
1968–1971	Irving Feist
1971–1973	Norton Clapp
1973–1975	Robert W. Reneker
1975–1977	Arch H. Monson. Jr.
1977–1979	Downing B. Jenks
1979	John D. Murchison (died in office)
1979–1980	Downing B. Jenks
1980–1982	Thomas C. MacAvoy
1982–1984	Edward C. Joullian III
1984–1986	Sanford N. McDonnell
1986–1988	Charles M. Pigott
1988–1990	Harold S. Hook
1990–1992	Richard H. Leet
1992–1994	John L. Clendenin
1994–1996	Norman R. Augustine
1996–1998	John W. Creighton Jr.
1998–2000	Edward Whitacre
2000–2002	Milton H. Ward
2002–2004	Roy S. Roberts
2004–2006	John C. Cushman
2006–2008	Rick Cronk
2008–2010	John Gottschalk
2010–2012	Rex Tillerson
2012–2014	Wayne M. Perry
2014–2016	Robert Gates
2016–2018	Randall L. Stephenson
2018–2020	Jim Turley
2020–2023	Daniel Gil "Dan" Ownby
2023–2026	Brad Tilden
2026-current	Richard “Ricky” G. Mason
