= Mortimer L. Schiff =

Banker and Scouts leader (1877–1931)

Mortimer Loeb Schiff
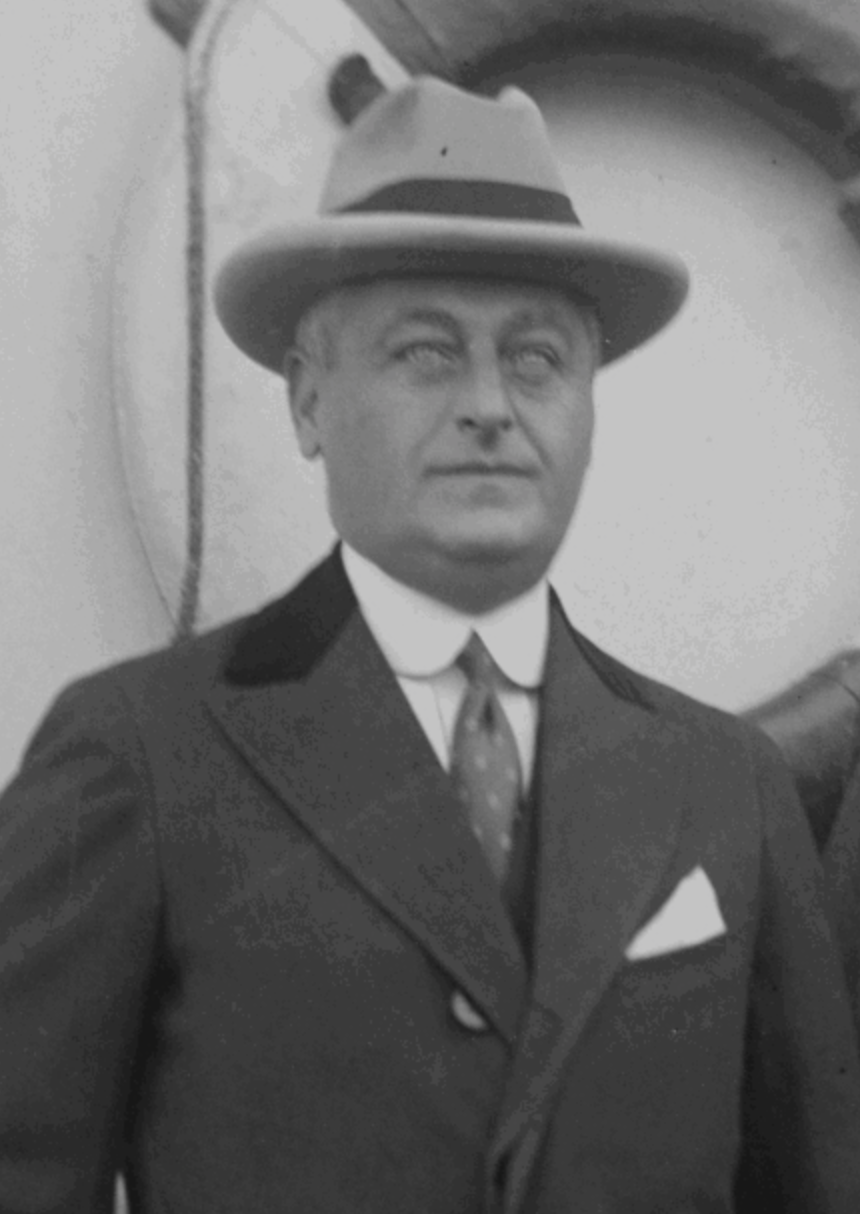
- Schiff in 1900

5th President of the Boy Scouts of America
- In office May 1931 – June 4, 1931
- Preceded by: Walter W. Head
- Succeeded by: Walter W. Head

Vice President of the Boy Scouts of America
- In office 1910–May, 1931

Senior Partner, Kuhn, Loeb & Co
- In office 1920–June 4, 1931
- Preceded by: Jacob Schiff

Member of the World Scout Committee of the World Organization of the Scout Movement
- In office 1901–1910

Member of the Nassau County Council Executive Board
- In office 1903–1910

Personal details
- Born: June 5, 1877
- Died: June 4, 1931 (aged 53)
- Spouse: Adele Neustadt
- Children: Dorothy Schiff; John M. Schiff
- Parent(s): Jacob Schiff; Therese Loeb
- Occupation: Politician, banker

Mortimer Loeb Schiff (June 5, 1877 – June 4, 1931), sometimes Mortimer Leo Schiff, was an American banker and notable early Boy Scouts of America (BSA) leader. His son, John Mortimer Schiff, was also involved with the BSA. He was also the father of Dorothy Schiff, who was the owner and publisher of the New York Post from 1939 to 1976.

== Life and career ==
Schiff memorialized on the cover of Scouting Magazine, July 1931

Mortimer Loeb Schiff was born on June 5, 1877, the only son of the German Jewish American banker and philanthropist Jacob Schiff and his wife, Therese (née Loeb). He entered Amherst College in the class of 1896, though he did not graduate; he was likely the first Jewish student ever to attend there. While he worked as a partner in the financial firm of Kuhn, Loeb & Co. from 1900 until his death in 1931, he also devoted much of his time to the development of scouting in America. He was a member of the World Scout Committee of the World Organization of the Scout Movement and the Nassau County (now Theodore Roosevelt) Council Executive Board. After a long tenure as vice-president of the BSA beginning in 1910, during which he also appeared on the cover of Time magazine on February 14, 1927, he was elected president of the organization in 1931. However, his untimely death came only one month later on June 4, 1931. He had also been serving as the BSA's International Commissioner for several years.

== Legacy ==
The property for the Mortimer L. Schiff Scout Reservation was purchased by his mother, named in his honor, and donated to the BSA for their national training center in April 1933.

Schiff's son, John M. Schiff, in 1961 was the 27th person worldwide to be awarded the Bronze Wolf, the only distinction of the World Organization of the Scout Movement, granted by the World Scout Committee for exceptional services to world Scouting. The Bronze Wolf award was first initiated in 1935 and given to Lord Baden-Powell, four years after the death of Mortimer Schiff.

== Personal life ==
Schiff was married to Adele Neustadt. They had two children: his daughter, Dorothy Schiff (March 11, 1903 – August 30, 1989) was an owner and then publisher of the New York Post for nearly 40 years. Both Mortimer and his son, John M. Schiff, received Silver Buffalo Awards from the BSA.

== See also ==
- John M. Schiff Scout Reservation

Boy Scouts of America
Preceded by Walter W. Head	National president May–June 1931	Succeeded by Walter W. Head
