= Rick Cronk =

American businessman

32nd National President of the Boy Scouts of America
- In office 2006–2008
- Preceded by: John C. Cushman
- Succeeded by: John Gottschalk

Personal details
- Born: October 4, 1942 (age 83) Lafayette, California
- Occupation: Chairman of the World Scout Committee

William F. "Rick" Cronk (born October 4, 1942) is an American businessman who was co-owner and president of Dreyer's Grand Ice Cream. He is a former national president of the Boy Scouts of America and chairman of the World Scout Committee of the World Organization of the Scout Movement.

== Business ==
After graduating from the Haas School of Business at the University of California, Berkeley with a bachelor's degree in 1965, Cronk started his career with Eastman Dillon & Co. In 1972 he started a restaurant chain called "Vintage House" in the same vein as theme eatery pioneer Victoria Station. The chain struggled and in 1977 Cronk and T. Gary Rogers purchased Dreyer's, then a popular ice cream company operating exclusively in the San Francisco Bay Area. Cronk built Dreyer's from a $6 million company to a $1.5 billion company. In 2003, Cronk retired after 26 years, having expanded Dreyer's to be the number one ice cream in the United States.

== Scouting ==
Cronk joined the Boy Scouts of America as a Cub Scout. As a Boy Scout he advanced to Life rank. As an adult, Cronk became a volunteer leader to support his sons, all three of whom are Eagle Scouts.

Cronk served as a district chairman, council president, area president and chairman of the World Scout Foundation. He received the Silver Buffalo Award in 2001.

Cronk was the National Commissioner of the Boy Scouts of America from 1999 to 2004. He then became an executive vice president in 2006 before becoming the president in 2006.

At the 2008 World Scout Conference, he was elected to a three-year term on the World Scout Committee, and subsequently elected the chairman of the committee. He was also presented with the Bronze Wolf award. Cronk is a member of the National Executive Board of the Boy Scouts of America, the organization's governing body.

World Organization of the Scout Movement
Preceded by Philippe Da Costa	Chairman, World Scout Committee; 2008-2011	Succeeded by Simon Hang-bock Rhee
Boy Scouts of America
Preceded by John C. Cushman III	National president 2006 – 2008	Succeeded by John Gottschalk
