= Jim Turley =

American businessman (born 1955)

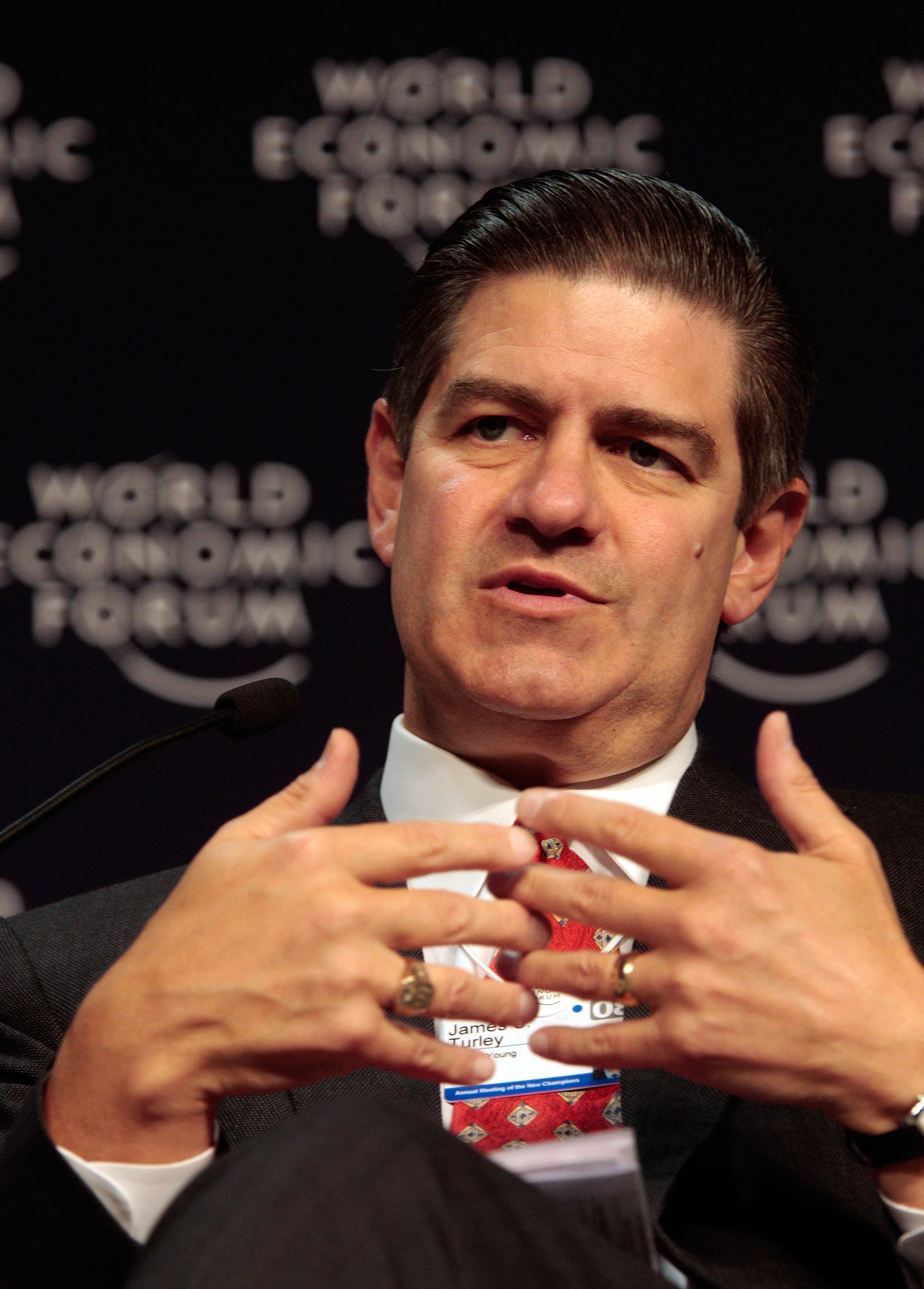
- Turley in 2008

38th National President of the Boy Scouts of America
- In office 2018–2019
- Preceded by: Randall Stephenson
- Succeeded by: Dan Ownby

Former chairman and CEO, Ernst & Young
- Succeeded by: Mark Weinberger

Personal details
- Born: James Stanton Turley; 1955 (age 70–71)
- Education: Rice University (B.A., Master of Accounting)

James S. Turley (born 1955) is an American business executive. He was chairman and chief executive officer of Ernst & Young from 2001 to 2013. He was the National President of the Boy Scouts of America from 2018 to 2019.

== Early life and education ==
Turley grew up in St. Louis, Missouri. He received a B.A. and a Master of Accounting from Rice University.

== Career ==
In 1977, Turley joined Ernst & Young in the US firm's Houston office and was chairman and CEO from July 2001 to June 2013.

Turley has co-chaired the Russia Foreign Investment Advisory Council and has been on the board of directors of Citigroup, Emerson Electric, Intrexon, Northrop Grumman Corporation, Boy Scouts of America, Catalyst, the National Corporate Theater Fund, and on the board of trustees of his alma mater, Rice University.

He has been a member of the Business Roundtable, International Business Leaders' Advisory Council for the mayor of Shanghai and Transatlantic Business Dialogue. Turley was the chair of the governing board of the U.S. Center for Audit Quality in 2007–2011. In 2010, he was appointed by Barack Obama to the President's Export Council.

In 2013, Turley was the 4th highest-rated CEO with an approval rating of 96% as calculated by Glassdoor.

== Personal life ==
Turley is married to Lynne Pounds from Kirkwood, a suburb of St. Louis, Missouri. He and his wife have one adult son.

Turley plays tennis and golf.

Upon Turley's retirement, Rice University’s Jones School announced the launch of the James S. Turley-Ernst & Young Leadership Development Initiative that focusses on accounting education. In conjunction with this, the university received a $2.5 million gift that includes $1 million from Turley, $500,000 from Ernst & Young and $1 million from Ernst & Young Rice alumni and various partner donations in honor of Turley.

== Politics ==
In 2012, Turley was the first member of the Boy Scouts of America Executive Board to come out in public disapproval of its policy of excluding gays. The following year, the policy was reversed, allowing gay youths to join the organisation.
