= John Stankey =

American businessman (born 1962)

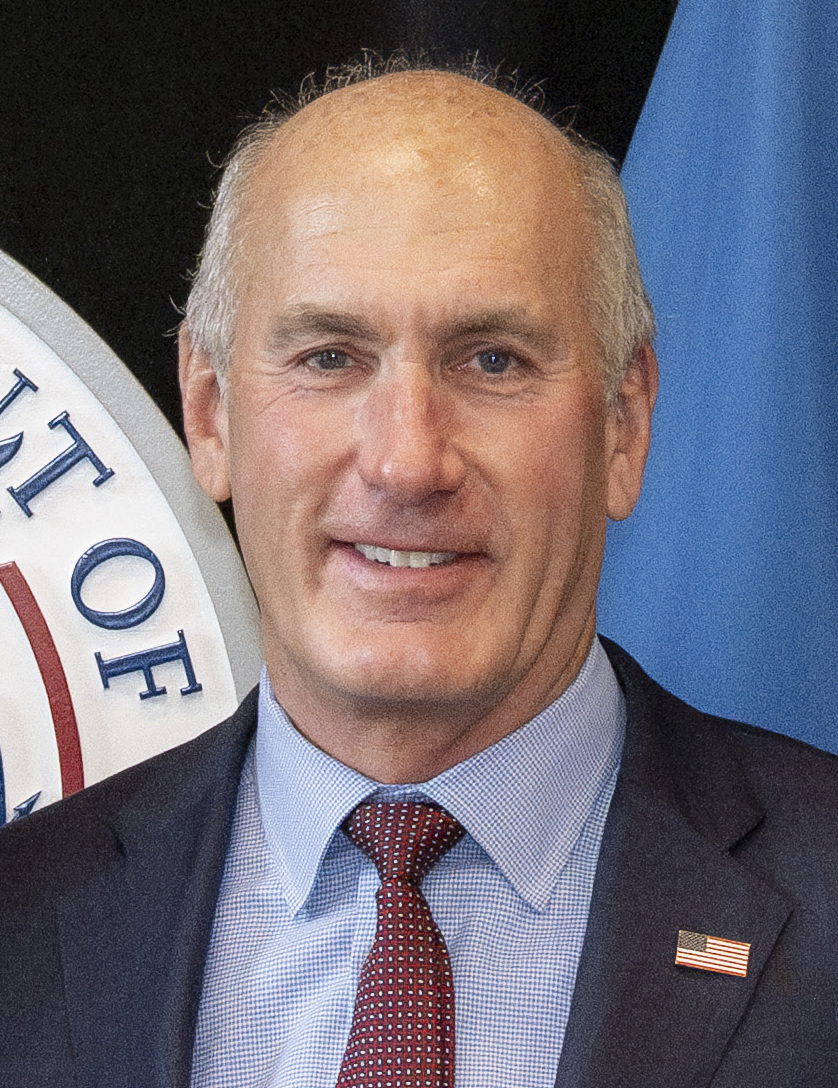
- Stankey in 2025
- Born: 1962 (age 63–64)
- Education: Loyola Marymount University (BBA); University of California, Los Angeles (MBA)
- Occupations: Chairman and CEO of AT&T

John T. Stankey (born 1962) is an American businessman who is the chairman and CEO of AT&T. He previously was AT&T's president and COO and before that CEO of WarnerMedia. He assumed the CEO role of AT&T in July 2020, succeeding Randall L. Stephenson.

== Early life and education ==
Stankey was raised in Los Angeles, the youngest of three children. His father was an insurance underwriter and his mother a housewife.

Stankey received a Bachelor of Business Administration with a major in finance from Loyola Marymount University in Los Angeles in 1985. He received a Master of Business Administration from the University of California, Los Angeles in 1991.

== Career ==
In 1985, Stankey took an entry-level position with Pacific Bell, which was acquired by SBC Communications in 1996. He went on to serve as the executive vice president of industry markets beginning in 1998, and became the executive president of industry markets in 2000. In 2001, he became the president and CEO of SBC Southwest.

Stankey served as CIO of the "new AT&T" after the merger of SBC with AT&T Corporation finalized in 2005. He was the senior executive vice president and CTO for AT&T from 2008 to 2012. In January 2012, he became the CSO and group president of AT&T.

In 2018, Stankey was named CEO of WarnerMedia, which owned various media and film corporations, including Warner Bros., HBO, Turner Broadcasting System, and CNN. On October 1, 2019, he became president and COO of AT&T, while continuing to serve as the CEO of WarnerMedia.

=== AT&T CEO ===
On April 1, 2020, AT&T announced that Stankey would be stepping down as CEO of WarnerMedia. On July 1, 2020, he replaced Randall L. Stephenson as CEO of AT&T Inc., then was elected chairman in February 2025.

In February 2021, Stankey oversaw the sale of a third of AT&T's stake in DirecTV to TPG Capital for $16.25 billion. AT&T had paid 48 billion ($67 billion including debt) to purchase DirecTV in 2015 under Stephenson. AT&T's remaining 70% stake in DirecTV was sold to TPG for $7.6 billion, announced in September 2024 and closing in 2025. Stankey also oversaw WarnerMedia's sale to Discovery Inc. in May 2021, for $43 billion in cash, plus an estimated $59 billion in Discovery, Inc. stock. AT&T had paid $85 billion for WarnerMedia in 2018 under Stephenson.

On April 30, 2021, AT&T announced that a nonbinding shareholder vote had rejected AT&T's executive compensation proposal by a slight majority, which came after reports that AT&T had "lost $5.4 billion and cut thousands of jobs". In 2023, Stankey's total compensation from AT&T was $25.7 million, representing a CEO-to-median worker pay ratio of 193-to-1.

Stankey refocused AT&T on broadband and cellular availability, connectivity, and speed, including partnering with AST SpaceMobile to provide mobile phone service to remote areas via satellite. Under his leadership, AT&T expanded its network of fiber-optic cables, including to places it didn't already provide broadband, reaching the milestone of 30 million fiber locations in 2025. In 2023, the company entered a joint venture with BlackRock, called Gigapower, to build fiber-optic networks in metro areas around the country.

After the US government ceased funding the Affordable Connectivity Program, in April 2024, Stankey announced that AT&T would direct $3 billion to address the digital divide of high-speed-internet access in the United States, including increasing the number of its Connected Learning Centers, which offer free computer and internet use and skills training, from 37 to 50 in 2024.

In 2025, he led the AT&T the $23 billion acquisition of approximately 50 MHz of low- and mid-band wireless spectrum licenses from EchoStar, which is slated to close in 2026.

Under Stankey's leadership, the company completed its $5.75 billion acquisition deal for most of Lumen Technologies' mass-market fiber business in February of 2026, increasing AT&T's fiber footprint by 11 states to a total of 32 states. With the continued focus on expanding its fiber-optic network footprint as part of its broader investment in US infrastructure, AT&T's fiber network reaches over 37 million customer locations, and the company is on track to reach more than 60 million fiber locations by 2030.

=== Additional posts ===
Stankey served on the board of directors for UPS from 2014 until 2020.

Business positions
Preceded by Jeff Bewkes	WarnerMedia CEO; 2018–2020	Succeeded by Jason Kilar
Preceded by Randall L. Stephenson	AT&T CEO; 2020–present	Incumbent
