= EY-Parthenon =

Multinational strategy consultancy

- Company type: Subsidiary
- Industry: Strategy consulting
- Founded: 2014; 12 years ago (first as Talisman, then The Parthenon Group then EY-Parthenon through merger of EY and The Parthenon Group)
- Founder: William "Bill" Achtmeyer & John Rutherford
- Headquarters: Boston, Massachusetts, United States
- Area served: Worldwide
- Key people: Jeff Wray (Global EY-Parthenon Leader), Founders William "Bill" Achtmeyer and John C. Rutherford
- Number of employees: over 9,000
- Website: www.ey.com/en_gl/strategy/about-ey-parthenon

EY-Parthenon (often shortened as EY-P or EYP) is Ernst & Young's global strategy consulting arm. The firm was established as The Parthenon Group LLC in 1991 by former Bain & Company directors William "Bill" Achtmeyer and John C. Rutherford. In 2014 The Parthenon Group merged with professional services firm EY forming the new entity EY-Parthenon. The move was viewed as part of the continued efforts by the Big Four to move up the value chain from their traditional audit services into more lucrative areas of business, as well as to provide new points of entry to clients.

The firm advises top management (C-Suite) on strategic issues across a broad range of industries including Private Equity, Consumer Products, Education, Financial Services, Healthcare, Information & Media, Advanced Manufacturing, Life Sciences, Oil & Gas and Technology. The firm competes with strategy consultancies such as McKinsey, Bain and BCG as well as the strategy consulting arms of the other Big Four firms such as Monitor Deloitte and Strategy&. Consistently placing near the top of strategy consulting rankings, Parthenon has a significant focus on private equity, corporate strategy, and mergers & acquisitions.

== History and merger ==
EY-Parthenon was founded in 1991 as The Parthenon Group by William "Bill" Achtmeyer and John C. Rutherford, who at that time served as director at the management consultancy Bain & Company. The founders established the firm to be a specialty boutique consulting firm leveraging the client relations they built during their time at Bain. In the subsequent years the firm grew rapidly and merged with Big Four professional services company Ernst & Young in 2014.

== Expansion under the EY brand ==
Under the new name EY-Parthenon the firm pursued an aggressive expansion strategy growing its consultant base from approximately 350 in 2014 to 1,400 in 2018. This growth was realized organically through expanding teams with new recruits as well as inorganically by acquiring consulting firms. Over the period 2016-2017, EY-Parthenon acquired the Benelux, French and German branches of OC&C Strategy Consultants. It bolstered its Asia Pacific offering through its acquisition of Australian boutique Port Jackson Partners in May 2020. It announced its first innovation collaboration with the global start-up ecosystem Plug and Play in October 2020 to enable their clients to engage with disruptive digital technologies.

As part of its expansion under EY, EY-Parthenon has published thought leadership in its focus sectors. For example, it has published several articles in the Education sector on helping underprivileged students secure employment, including a 2014 report for the United States Department of Education on its Gainful Employment rule, and a 2018 report for the Boston Public Schools school district on better serving "off-track" youth.

Since 2020, EY-Parthenon has partnered with CNBC to produce and deliver Real World Strategy, a video series on how CEOs can develop ambitious and actionable business strategies.

== Rankings ==
In 2023, EY-Parthenon was ranked 4th globally in the Vault Consulting 50 as well as the 5th most prestigious. It also ranked 8th in the Top 25 Strategy Consulting firms by consultancy.uk.

== See also ==
- Big Four accounting firms
- Big Three (management consultancies)
