= Edward C. Joullian III =

National president of the Boy Scouts of America
- In office 1982–1984
- Preceded by: Thomas C. MacAvoy
- Succeeded by: Sanford N. McDonnell

Personal details
- Born: Edward Carey Joullian III; August 12, 1929 Blackwell, Oklahoma
- Died: September 25, 2006 (aged 77) Oklahoma City, Oklahoma

Edward Carey Joullian III (August 12, 1929 – September 25, 2006) was an American businessman who served as the national president of the Boy Scouts of America from 1982–84.

== Biography ==
Joullian's father, Edward C. Joullian Jr., was an oil executive at Mustang Fuel Corp. who served as president and treasurer of the Last Frontier Council of the Boy Scouts.

Joullian's involvement in scouting began in 1938 when he joined the Cub Scouts at his elementary school in Oklahoma City. He eventually became an Eagle Scout. He was president of the Boy Scouts of America from 1982–84.

Joullian also ran Mustang Fuel and was active in Oklahoma City civic life. He served as chairman of the Oklahoma State Fair from 1987–97 and was president of the board of the National Cowboy & Western Heritage Museum.

== Honors ==
Joullian was awarded the Bronze Wolf, the only distinction of the World Organization of the Scout Movement, awarded by the World Scout Committee for exceptional services to world Scouting. He was also a 1984 recipient of the Silver Buffalo Award. He was one of only six men to hold all four top-tier Scouting awards, the Bronze Wolf, the Silver Buffalo, the Silver Antelope, and the Distinguished Eagle Scout Award.

Boy Scouts of America
Preceded by Thomas C. MacAvoy	National president 1982–1984	Succeeded by Sanford N. McDonnell
