= Sanford N. McDonnell =

American engineer, businessman and philanthropist

National president of the Boy Scouts of America
- In office 1984–1986

CEO of McDonnell Douglas
- In office 1972-?

President of McDonnell Douglas
- In office 1971-?

Personal details
- Born: October 12, 1922 Little Rock, Arkansas, USA
- Died: 19 March 2012 (aged 89)
- Relatives: James S. McDonnell (uncle); John F. McDonnell (cousin)
- Education: Princeton University; University of Colorado Boulder; Washington University in St. Louis
- Occupation: Engineer, company executive

Sanford Noyes "Sandy" McDonnell (October 12, 1922 – March 19, 2012) was an American engineer, businessman and philanthropist. Former chairman and chief executive officer of McDonnell Douglas Corporation, he also served as national president of the Boy Scouts of America and as chairman of Character Education Partnership. He was "Man of the Year" in St. Louis in 1984.

== Career ==
A native of Little Rock, Arkansas, McDonnell attended Princeton University, the University of Colorado Boulder and Washington University in St. Louis, achieving bachelor's degrees in economics (1945) and mechanical engineering (1948) and a master's degree in applied mechanics (1954). In 1948, he joined McDonnell Aircraft Corporation, a company founded by his uncle, James S. McDonnell, as a stress engineer. He participated in the development of the F-101 Voodoo and the F-4 Phantom II jet fighters. In 1962 he was named vice president-general manager of all combat aircraft, and he became the president of the company, by then McDonnell Douglas, in 1971. The following year, he became chief executive officer. In 1980, James S. McDonnell died, and McDonnell succeeded him as chairman of the board, a role he retained until 1988. He has also been chairman of the board of governors of the Aerospace Industries Association.

Arkansas Aviation Historical Society inducted McDonnell into the Arkansas Aviation Hall of Fame in 1989.

== Philanthropy ==
During his service with McDonnell Douglas, McDonnell had a strong interest in ethics. As a child, he had been a Boy Scout, rising to the rank of Star Scout. During his term with McDonnell Douglas, he used the Scout Promise as the basis for a work Code of Ethics. Following his retirement, McDonnell turned his focus to education and the need of focusing on character in public schools. After establishing a program in St. Louis public schools (the Personal Responsibility Education Process), he became founding chair of the national Character Education Partnership in 1993, a position he held until 2005.

McDonnell worked to translate the character education programs of the Boy Scouts to higher education through service academies. "The military academies are far ahead of almost all of the other universities in the emphasis they place on character building," he once said. "I hope universities all across the nation will emulate their programs for character development." He pledged $5 million to the U.S. Air Force Academy in 2011 for a Center for Character and Leadership Development.

McDonnell also served in other areas. In 1987, he became the first president of the Foundation for the Malcolm Baldrige National Quality Award, a foundation that supports the Baldrige Performance Excellence Program in recognizing U.S. organizations that "have a role-model organizational management system that ensures continuous improvement in the delivery of products and/or services, demonstrates efficient and effective operations, and provides a way of engaging and responding to customers and other stakeholders."

Boy Scouts of America
| Preceded by Edward C. Joullian III | National president 1984–1986 | Succeeded by Charles M. Pigott |
