= John C. Cushman III =

American businessman (1941–2023)

John Cushman
- Born: 1941
- Died: May 4, 2023 (aged 82)
- Education: Colgate University
- Occupation: Businessman
- Employer: Cushman & Wakefield
- Title: Chairman
- Spouse: Jeanine
- Children: 4

31st National President of the Boy Scouts of America
- In office 2004–2006
- Preceded by: Roy S. Roberts
- Succeeded by: Rick Cronk

John C. Cushman III (1941 – May 4, 2023) was an American real estate executive. He was the chairman of global transactions and chairman of the board of Cushman & Wakefield, a global real estate services firm founded by his grandfather, J. Clydesdale Cushman and great-uncle, Bernard Wakefield.

Additionally, Cushman held directorships at Callaway Golf Company, iCRETE LLC (Co-chairman) and ARTOC Universal Properties (Co-chairman) in Cairo, Egypt. He served as Chairman of Rock Creek Management LLC and chairman and Director of Zaca Mesa Winery in Santa Barbara County, California, which he co-founded.

== Background and personal life ==
Cushman & Wakefield is a real estate services firm founded by his grandfather John Clydesdale Cushman and his great uncle Bernard Wakefield.

Cushman and his wife, Jeanine, had four sons. He died on May 4, 2023, at the age of 82.

== Career ==
In 1963, Cushman joined Cushman & Wakefield Inc. in New York, New York after graduating from Colgate University. In 1967, he opened an office for Cushman & Wakefield in Los Angeles. On April 1, 1978, he and his twin brother, Louis B. Cushman, left Cushman & Wakefield to form Cushman Realty Corporation.

In 2001, the Cushman Realty Corporation merged with Cushman & Wakefield, after which Cushman III became the chairman of Cushman & Wakefield.

On September 19, 2007, Cushman received The Hundred Year Association of New York's Gold Medal "in recognition of outstanding contributions to the City of New York".

== Other work ==
Cushman has served as National president of the Boy Scouts of America and was a member of the National Executive Board of the Boy Scouts of America.

Cushman was a commissioner of the California Commission for Jobs and Economic Growth, a board member of the California Region I Homeland Security Advisory Council, and a trustee of the Urban Land Institute. He served on the boards of The Real Estate Roundtable; Town Hall and the World Affairs Council of Los Angeles; the Institute of International Education, New York City; the University of Southern California’s LUSK Center for Real Estate; Colgate University, Hamilton, New York; University of Colorado Boulder Business School; Fellows of Claremont University Center; and the National Park Foundation.

Cushman was a Director and Chairman of Cushman Winery Corporation and owned Zaca Mesa Winery. Cushman has also served on the boards of Callaway Golf Company, Culinary Holdings, Inc., Cushman & Wakefield, Inc., D.A. Cushman Realty Corporation, Inglewood Park Cemetery, La Quinta Corporation, and La Quinta Properties, Inc.

== Political activity ==
In 2015, Cushman donated $300,000 to Right to Rise, a Super PAC supporting Jeb Bush's presidential candidacy.

== See also ==
- Cushman & Wakefield

Boy Scouts of America
Preceded by Roy S. Roberts	National president 2004–2006	Succeeded by Rick Cronk
