= Walter W. Head =

American businessman (1877–1954)

Walter William Head
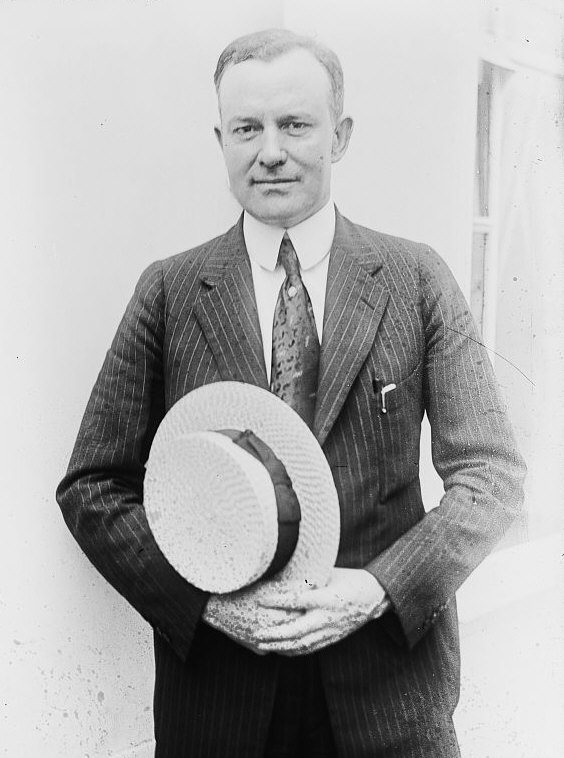

4th President of the Boy Scouts of America
- In office May 1926 – 1931
- Preceded by: Milton A. McRae
- Succeeded by: Mortimer L. Schiff

6th President of the Boy Scouts of America
- In office 1931–1946
- Preceded by: Mortimer L. Schiff
- Succeeded by: Amory Houghton

Personal details
- Born: December 18, 1877 Adrian, Illinois, U.S.
- Died: May 3, 1954 (aged 76) Stamford, Connecticut, U.S.
- Cause of death: pneumonia
- Spouse: Della Thompson
- Children: one daughter
- Parent(s): Alfred Walter Head and Margaret Jane Lambert
- Occupation: Business

Walter William Head (December 18, 1877 – May 3, 1954) was an American banker and insurance executive. He was president and founder of the General American Life Insurance Company, now a part of MetLife, and president of the American Bankers Association. Head also served as national president of the Boy Scouts of America for nearly twenty years, from 1926 to 1946.

== Early life ==
Walter William Head was born December 18, 1877, on a farm near Adrian, Illinois. He was the first of five children born to Alfred Walter Head and Margaret Jane Lambert. The New York Times said that Head "was deeply influenced by his mother, a devout woman who imbued him with a warm, human philosophy of life". At age 8, he moved with his family to a rural area of DeKalb County, Missouri, where he attended public schools. After graduating from Northwest Missouri State Teachers College (Maryville), Head began teaching in a one-room schoolhouse and, at age 24, was named school principal in the town of De Kalb, Missouri.

== Banking ==
Head left teaching for the banking field in 1904, starting as a bank cashier at age 26. In 1917, he was named vice president of Omaha National Bank in Omaha, Nebraska, becoming the bank's president in 1920. During his time as bank president in Omaha, Walter Head also became president of the American Bankers Association and a director of New York Life Insurance Company.

In 1929, Head took over as president of State Bank of Chicago. Upon his arrival, Head guided State Bank through a merger with Foreman National. When Foreman National was acquired by First National Bank in 1931, Walter Head resigned to become president of Morris Plan Corp., a New York-based banking organization making small loans to moderate income families through banks in more than 100 U.S. cities. At the time, Morris Plan was the largest industrial banking system in the U.S., with $200 million in annual business and 800,000 customers.

== Insurance ==
Head left banking in 1933, when he became the first president of Great American Life Insurance Company in St. Louis, Missouri. The new company was formed by Equity Corporation, controlled by David Milton (son-in-law of John D. Rockefeller Jr.). Equity had acquired the business of Missouri State Life in bankruptcy court in September, 1933, following Missouri State Life's collapse during the Great Depression. Milton recruited Head to be the founder and first president of General American Life and take over Missouri State Life's business. Head continued as president of Great American Life Insurance until January, 1951, when he was succeeded by P. B. McHaney.

== Civic ==
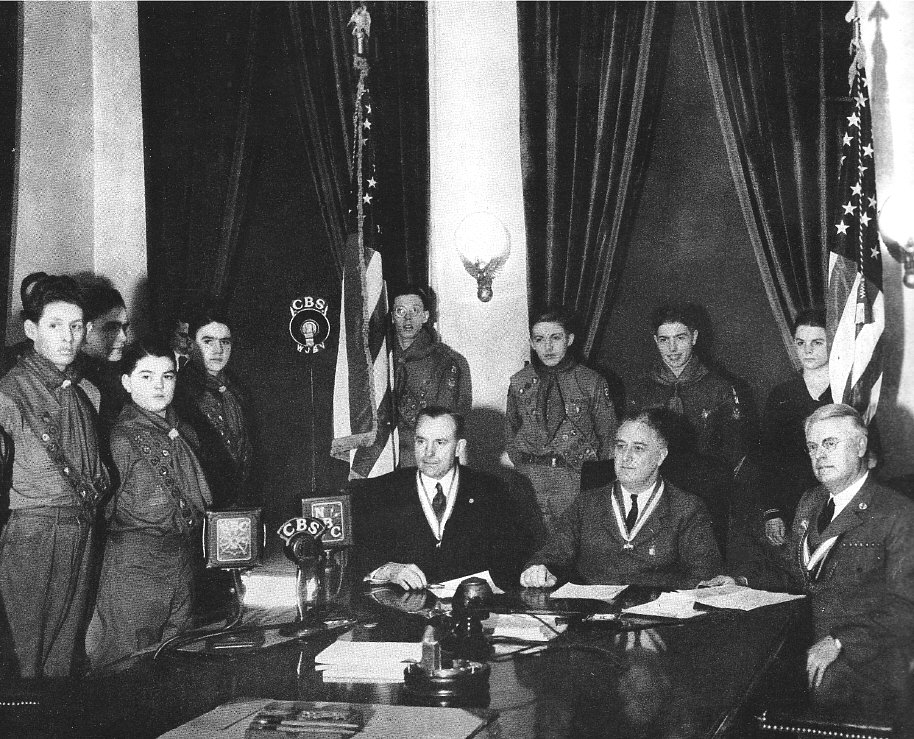
Walter W. Head at the White House with U.S. President Franklin D. Roosevelt and Chief Scout Executive James E. West announcing the first national Scout jamboree

Head was appointed by Nebraska Governor Samuel R. McKelvie in 1920 to the Nebraska Capitol Commission, which was responsible for the construction of the new Nebraska State Capitol building.

Head served as fourth and sixth national president of the Boy Scouts of America. His first term was from 1926 to 1931. His successor, Mortimer L. Schiff died after one month in office; Head then served from 1931 to 1946. During his presidency, the Boy Scouts of America (BSA) held its first national Scout jamboree in Washington, D. C. Head joined U.S. Pres. Franklin D. Roosevelt and BSA Chief Scout Executive James E. West in a radio address to the nation from the Oval Office announcing the event in 1937.

== Death ==
A year after the death of his wife (the former Della Thompson) in 1951, Head entered a nursing home due to Parkinson's disease and arteriosclerosis. He died of pneumonia at Stamford Hospital in Stamford, Connecticut, on May 3, 1954, and was survived by one daughter.

== See also ==
- History of the Boy Scouts of America

Boy Scouts of America
Preceded by Milton A. McRae	National president 1926–1931	Succeeded by Mortimer L. Schiff
Preceded by Mortimer L. Schiff	National president 1931–1946	Succeeded by Amory Houghton
