= Janet Truncale =

American business executive (born 1970)

- Born: 1970 (age 55–56); Mountainside, New Jersey, US
- Education: University of Pennsylvania (BSE); Columbia University (MBA)
- Occupation: business executive
- Title: Global Chair and CEO of Ernst & Young
- Term: July 2024 -
- Predecessor: Carmine Di Sibio
- Children: 3

Janet Elaine Wilson Truncale (born August 1970) is an American business executive who has been the global chair and chief executive officer of Ernst & Young (EY) since 2024.

== Early life ==
Truncale was born in Mountainside, New Jersey, in 1970. She received her bachelor's degree in economics from The Wharton School of the University of Pennsylvania, followed by an MBA from Columbia University. She is a certified public accountant in New York and a member of the American Institute of Certified Public Accountants.

== Career ==
Truncale joined EY in 1991 as an intern. After working for over 30 years in financial services, she rose to the regional managing partner of the EY Americas Financial Services Organization.

She is the board chair for Women's World Banking.

=== Ernst & Young ===
Truncale was selected as the EY Global Chair and CEO-elect, and assumed the role on 1 July 2024, making her the first woman to lead a Big Four accounting firm.
