= Powerwave Technologies =

Powerwave Technologies, Inc.
- Company type: Public (Nasdaq: PWAV)
- Industry: Telecommunications
- Founded: 1985
- Defunct: June 10, 2013
- Headquarters: Santa Ana, California, United States
- Area served: Worldwide
- Key people: Alfonso Cordero, Founder
- Products: Hardware, software, and services for telecommunications service providers
- Revenue: US$ 591.5 million (2010)
- Number of employees: 2100 (2010)
- Website: Powerwave.com

Powerwave Technologies Inc. was a global telecommunications corporation founded in 1985 and disbanded in 2013. Their products focused on expanding coverage, capacity, and data speed in wireless communications networks. The company also made wireless infrastructure such as antennas, base stations, and coverage systems, which covered all major frequency bands and air interfaces. They also focused on deploying 4G WiMAX and LTE systems.

Powerwave Technologies filed for Chapter 11 bankruptcy on 28 January 2013. Powerwave ceased operations by extending the bankruptcy to Chapter 7 bankruptcy on 10 June 2013.

== Acquisitions ==
In 2004, Powerwave acquired LGP Allgon, a global provider of wireless infrastructure equipment and coverage solutions.

In 2005, Powerwave acquired Kaval Wireless, an Ontario-based company that supplies in-building wireless coverage. Also in 2005, it acquired certain assets of REMEC, Inc.’s wireless systems business, including its RF conditioning products, filters, tower mounted amplifiers, and RF power amplifiers.

In 2006, the company acquired specific product lines from Filtronic's Wireless Infrastructure division which included transmit/receive filters, integrated remote radio heads, and power amplifier products, all for use in commercial wireless infrastructure base station equipment.

== Organization ==
Powerwave had office locations in 15 countries. The company's headquarters were in Santa Ana, California.

== Company leadership ==
Alfonso "Al" Cordero founded the company in Garden Grove, California in 1985.

Bruce C. Edwards served as the president from 1996 to 2004, and as chief executive officer from 1996 to 2005.

Ronald J. Buschur was named president and chief executive officer in 2005.

== Bankruptcy ==
Powerwave Technologies filed for Chapter 11 bankruptcy on January 28, 2013 with a listed debt of $396M and assets of $213M. As a result of bankruptcy proceedings, Powerwave closed down operations in May 2013.

In September 2014, Intel announced that it would buy about 1,400 Powerwave patents, mainly relating to wireless communication. The price was not disclosed.
