= Paula Fray =

South African journalist

Paula Maria Fray
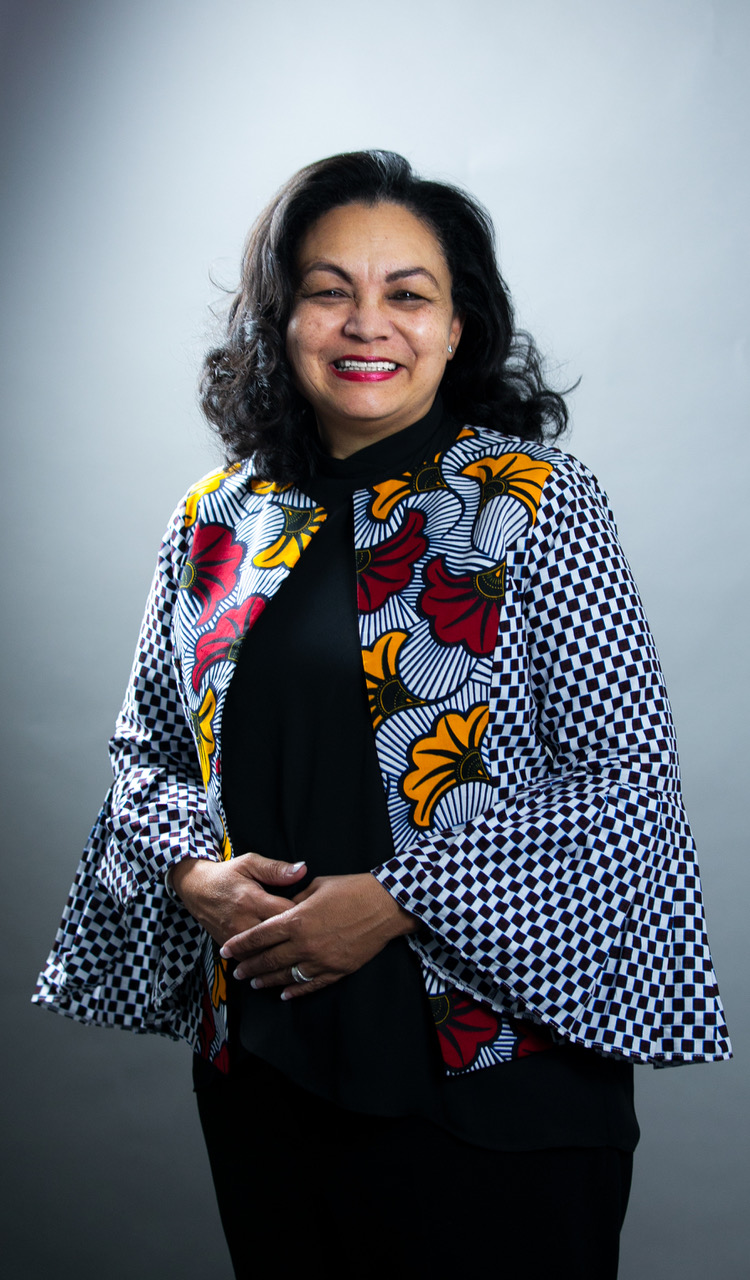
- Born: Fray; April 6, 1966; Mthatha Eastern Cape region of South Africa
- Citizenship: South African
- Education: Holy Trinity Primary School; Rhodes University; University of South Africa (UNISA)
- Occupations: Journalist; entrepreneur; media development trainer
- Employers: Star newspaper; BrandSA; South Africa's Saturday Star
- Awards: Rhodes University Distinguished Alumni Award 2022; SANEF Stephen Wrottesley Award 2017; PDMSA 2015 Print & Digital Media SA Fellows; EY Entrepreneurial Winning Women Class of 2015; Selected as one of Elle magazine's “The Elle 30” (January 2000); Cosmopolitan's “21 for the 21st Century: SA’s Awesome Young Women” (December 1999); Consumer Council Media Award 1991; Checkers/Shoprite Investigative Journalism Award (Overall) 1991; Checkers Merit Award 1988 Olleman's Trophy (Most Promising Argus Cadet) 1987

Paula Maria Fray (born April 6, 1966 (age 60)) is a South African journalist, entrepreneur and media development trainer. She was also the first female editor of South Africa's Saturday Star newspaper.

== Education and background ==
Fray was born in Mthatha in the Eastern Cape region of South Africa and studied at Holy Trinity Primary School in Elsies River. She attended Athlone High School, matriculating in 1983 to attend Rhodes University. She studied journalism and economic history at Rhodes University graduating in 1986 with a bachelor's degree in journalism. In 1996, Fray obtained a Certificate in Women and Law Studies from the University of South Africa and later on, she started a master's degree in Business Administration in 2008. Earlier on in 2000, she was named a Nieman Fellow at Harvard University for the 2000 – 2001 academic year.

== Career ==
In June 1999, Fray became the first female editor of South Africa's Saturday Star newspaper, a position which she resigned from in 2003 and joined Blackrock Communications as an Operations Director. In 2005, Fray founded a private company Fray and Associates (Paula Fray & Associates), today known as frayintermedia. The company was established by Fray to improve journalistic standards, recognising that journalism differs from other crafts in that it is very dynamic and by keeping up to date with the latest trends and changes in the industry, the company sets itself apart from traditional schools of journalism.

In January 2008, Fray was appointed as the Inter Press Service Regional Director for Africa where she served until May 2012. She took over as CEO of frayintermedia and has since worked on a number of projects and consultancies in addition to serving as mentor and trustee for various organisations and initiatives. From 2012 until 2016 Fray was a trustee of BrandSA. She also served as the Deputy Press Ombud: South African Press Council from January 2016 until January 2018.

In 2018, after significant growth and demand for the training and mentoring offered by frayintermedia, the company branched off to form its sister company, fraycollege which offers a number of e-Learning courses as well as in-person classes taught by Fray herself.

In 2019, she was appointed as the President of The New Humanitarian. Fray currently also serves as a public representative on the Press Council of South Africa and as a board member for Africa Check. In 2019 she was one of the founding members of Accountability Lab South Africa and currently serves as a board member.

=== Inquiry into Racism in the Media Hearings ===
In 1998, South African Human Rights Commission received a request from the Black Lawyers Association (BLA) and the Association of Black Accountants of South Africa (ABASA) to investigate alleged racism by two newspapers in Johannesburg, the Mail and Guardian and the Sunday Times.

Several editors, including Fray, were subpoenaed to the hearings. After negotiations, editors agreed to testify. Fray said, “and I think racism, the other side of sexism is internalised oppression and it would be very foolish for me to assume that when I walked into Saturday Star as a black woman editor that I did not carry with me a certain way of thinking, a certain way of operating that has been produced from years of believing that I was a female and all this associated baggage that goes with being black and female”.

In August 2000, the commission produced a report ‘Faultlines: Inquiry into Racism in the media’ with their findings. The report found that “South African media can be characterised as racist institutions” but goes on to note “we have found no evidence of the mainstream media indulging in blatant advocacy of racial hatred or incitement to racial violence”

=== Prizes and awards ===
Rhodes University Distinguished Alumni Award 2022

SANEF Stephen Wrottesley Award 2017

PDMSA 2015 Print & Digital Media SA Fellows

EY Entrepreneurial Winning Women Class of 2015

Selected as one of Elle magazine's “The Elle 30” (January 2000)

Cosmopolitan's “21 for the 21st Century: SA’s Awesome Young Women” (December 1999)

Consumer Council Media Award 1991

Checkers/Shoprite Investigative Journalism Award (Overall) 1991

Checkers Merit Award 1988

Olleman's Trophy (Most Promising Argus Cadet) 1987

== Personal life ==
Fray is married to Desmond Latham and is a mother of three.
