= Sheri Jacobson =

Canadian retired psychotherapist, and public speaker

Sheri Jacobson (born 1976) is a Canadian retired psychotherapist, and public speaker.

== Career ==
Jacobson is known for campaigns to destigmatise therapy and promote emotional wellbeing. She has appeared on television, radio, and in the press commenting on mental health issues, including depression.

She runs a podcast named "TherapyLab" where she interviews guests about their childhoods, life struggles, mental health and their views on talking therapy including both good and bad. She is the founder and CEO of Harley Therapy - a group of private psychotherapy clinics headquartered in Harley Street, and the associated Harley Therapy Platform, an online marketplace for psychotherapy and counselling.

Jacobson was chosen to join the Mayor of London's trade mission for entrepreneurs to Silicon Valley. She was selected for the EY Winning Women program in 2018. She was a Finalist in 2018 Enterprise Awards - "The Oscars for Technology".
