= Ernst & Young =

Multinational professional services network

Ernst & Young Global Limited
- Trade name: EY
- Type: Private company limited by guarantee
- Industry: Professional services
- Predecessor: Ernst & Whinney; Arthur Young & Co.
- Founded: 1989; 37 years ago (through merger of Ernst & Whinney and Arthur Young & Co.; oldest component from 1849)
- Headquarters: London, England, UK
- Area served: Worldwide
- Key people: Janet Truncale (global chair and CEO)
- Services: Assurance; Tax advisory; Digital Transformation; Information Technology; Cybersecurity; Artificial Intelligence; Strategy consulting; Financial advisory; Legal
- Revenue: ▲US$53.219 billion (2025)
- Number of employees: 406,000 (2025)
- Divisions: Assurance; Consulting; Strategy and Transactions; Tax; EY Private
- Subsidiaries: EY-Parthenon
- Website: www.ey.com

EY, previously known as Ernst & Young, is a multinational professional services network that provides assurance, tax, information technology services (including managed services in areas like cybersecurity, cloud computing, digital transformation and AI), consulting, and transactions advice. Along with Deloitte, KPMG and PwC, it is one of the Big Four professional services firms. The EY network is composed of member firms of Ernst & Young Global Limited, a UK company limited by guarantee headquartered in London, England. EY is one of the largest professional services networks in the world.

Ernst & Young Global Limited operates as a network of member firms structured as separate legal entities. As of 2026, it employs approximately 406,000 people across more than 700 offices in over 150 countries and territories.

The firm was formally created as Ernst & Young through a merger in 1989, though its oldest predecessor firms were founded in 1849. In 2013, the organization changed its brand name to EY.

In 2023, EY was the seventh-largest privately owned organization in the United States, and had been continuously ranked on Fortune magazine's list of the 100 Best Companies to Work For for 25 years, longer than any other accounting firm. The firm has, however, repeatedly come under scrutiny for systemic issues in their training, hiring, and work culture.

== History ==
=== Early history and mergers ===
EY resulted from several mergers of firms over the last century and a half, the oldest of which was founded in 1849, in England, as Harding & Pullein. That same year, this firm was joined by an accountant named Frederick Whinney, who, a decade later, became a partner. After his son joined the firm, it was later renamed Whinney, Smith & Whinney, in 1894.

In 1903, the firm Ernst & Ernst was founded in Cleveland, Ohio, by Alwin C. Ernst, and his brother, Theodore Ernst. In 1906, Arthur Young & Co. was set up by a Scottish accountant, Arthur Young, in Chicago. Starting in 1924, these two American firms became allied with prominent British firms; Young with Broads Paterson & Co.; and Ernst with the aforementioned Whinney Smith & Whinney. The latter of these two mergers spawned the Anglo-American partnership, Ernst & Whinney in 1979, then the fourth largest accountancy firm in the world.

A decade later, in 1989, Ernst & Whinney merged with the fifth largest firm globally at the time, Arthur Young & Co., to create Ernst & Young.

=== Later developments ===
Ernst & Young logo, 1990–2012

In October 1997, Ernst & Young announced plans to merge its global practices with professional services network KPMG, to create the largest professional services organization in the world. The announcement came on the heels of an announced merger between Price Waterhouse and Coopers & Lybrand only a month earlier. These plans were soon abandoned in February 1998, due to several factors ranging from client opposition, antitrust issues, cost problems, and the anticipated difficulty of merging the two diverse firms and cultures. The merger between Price Waterhouse and Coopers & Lybrand, however, went ahead as planned, creating PwC.

Ernst & Young expanded its consulting practice heavily during the 1980s and 1990s. During this time, the U.S. Securities and Exchange Commission, and various members of the investment community, began to raise concerns about a potential conflict of interests. This conflict would be brought about by firms offering both consulting and auditing services simultaneously to overlapping clients, a common practice among the "Big Five". In May 2000, Ernst & Young was the first of those firms to fully separate its consulting practices via a sale to the French IT services company Capgemini for $11 billion, creating the new company Capgemini Ernst & Young, which was later renamed back to Capgemini.

=== Recent history, re-branding and expansion ===
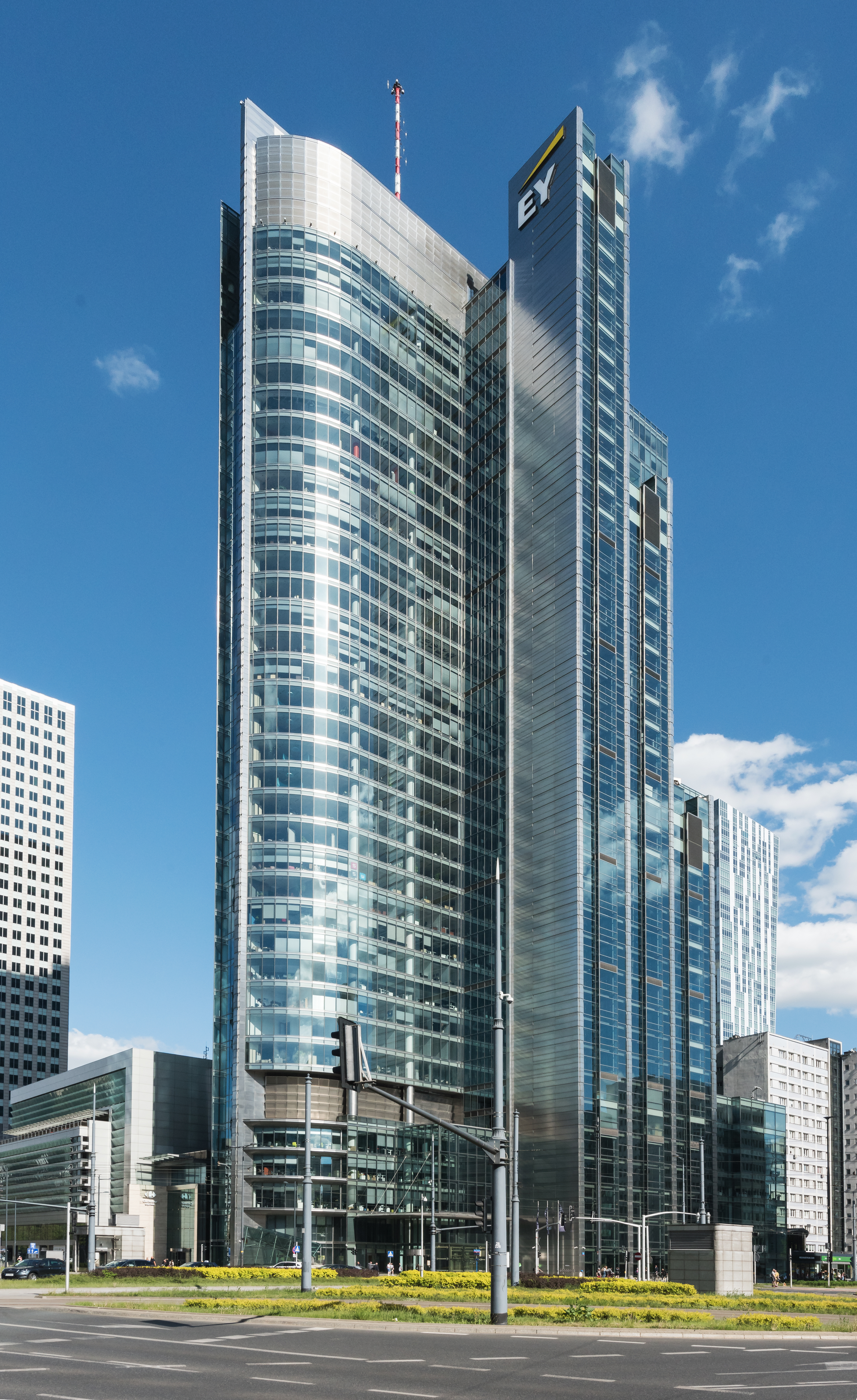
EY offices in Warsaw, Poland

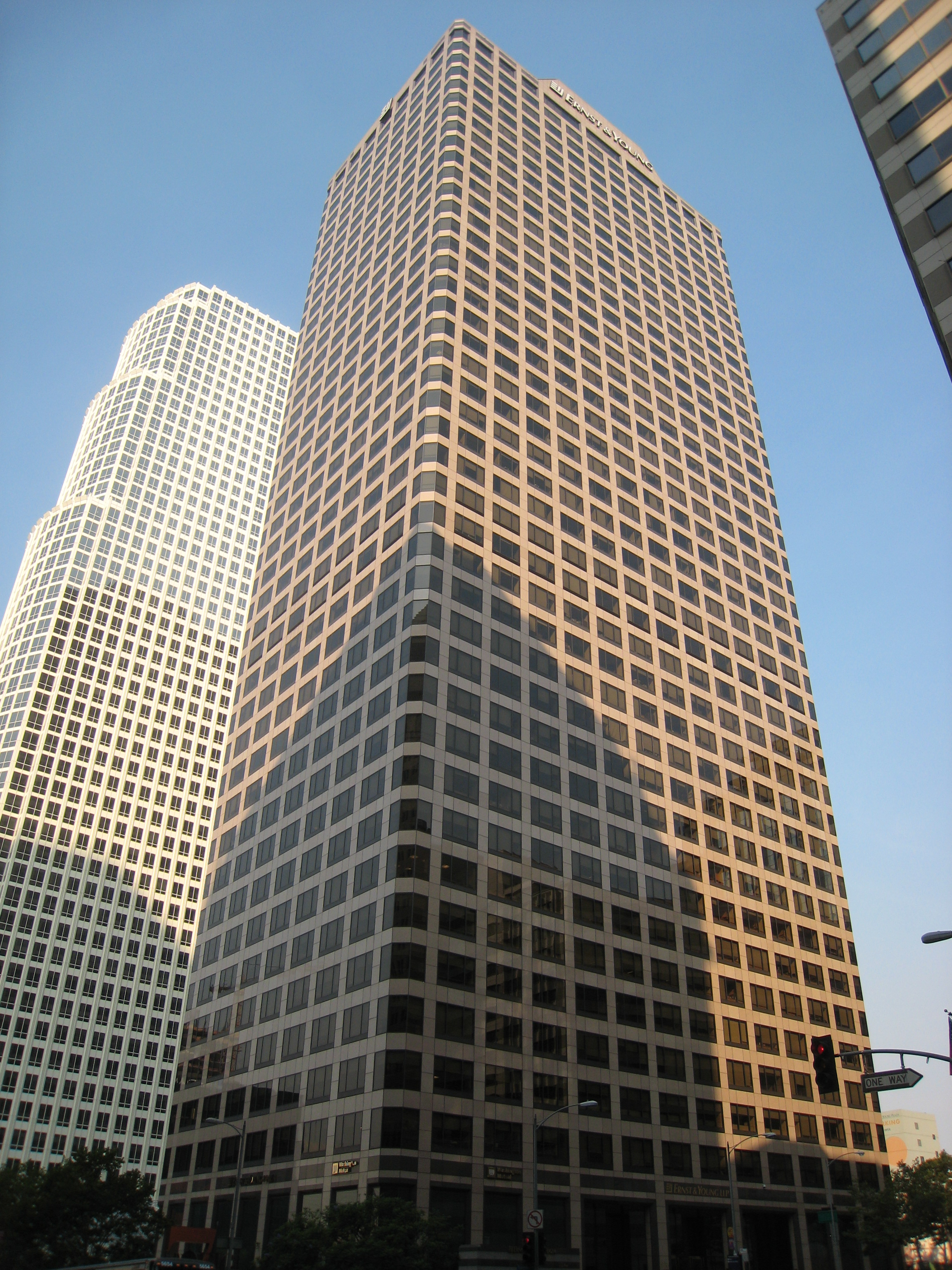
Ernst & Young Plaza in Los Angeles, California, US

Ernst & Young office in Sandton, Johannesburg, South Africa

In 2002, Ernst & Young took on a large number of the clients previously working with Arthur Andersen following its collapse in connection with the Enron scandal, although it did not engage with any new Arthur Andersen clients from the United Kingdom, China, or the Netherlands.

Four years later, in 2006, Ernst & Young became the only member of the Big Four to have two member firms in the United States, with the inclusion of Mitchell & Titus, LLP, the largest minority-owned accounting firm in the United States. Mitchell & Titus ended its membership in the EY network effective October 30, 2015.

In April 2009, Reuters reported that Ernst & Young, spurred by the global economic downturn, had launched a cost-saving initiative encouraging its staff in China to take 40 days of low-pay leave between the summer of 2009 and the summer of 2010. Those who participated got a prorated salary equal to 20% of a regular salary, plus the benefits of a full-time employee. The initiative applied to employees in Hong Kong, Macau and mainland China, where the firm's employees numbered 8,500 in total. In 2010, Ernst & Young acquired Terco, the Brazilian member firm of Grant Thornton.

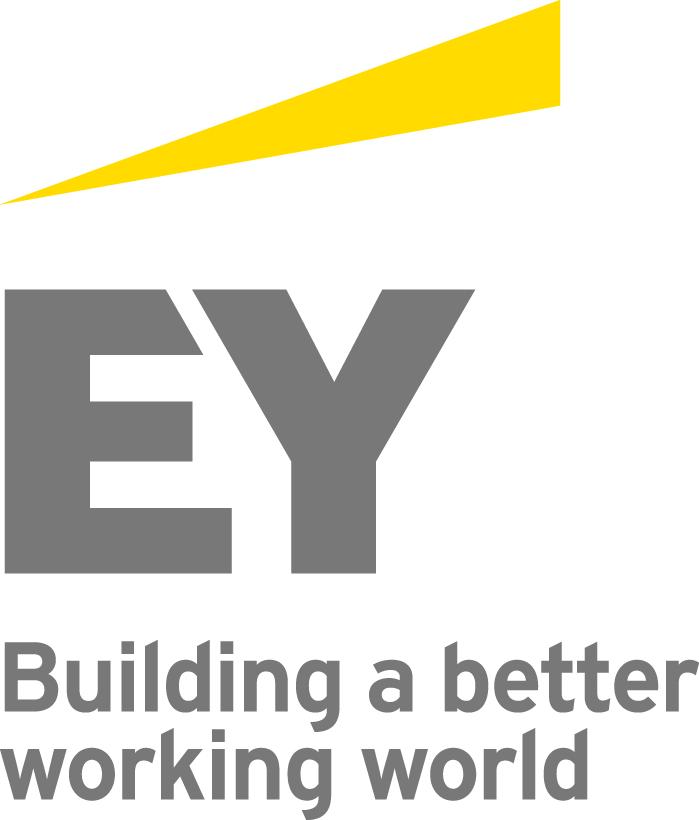
EY logo, 2013–2018

In 2013, the firm officially changed its brand from Ernst & Young to EY, and christened the accompanying tagline: "Building a better working world".

Also in 2013, the Pope of the Roman Catholic Church hired EY to help review the Vatican City State's finances and "verify and consult" the institution's administration, including the museums, post office and tax-free department store. EY expanded further and acquired all of KPMG Denmark's operations including its 150 partners, 1,500 employees and 21 offices.

In 2014, EY acquired global strategy consulting firm The Parthenon Group, gaining 350 consultants in its then-Transaction Advisory Services practice so that it could provide in-house strategy consulting services to its clients. The business unit has since been rebranded as EY-Parthenon and is one of the most selective strategy consultancies worldwide.

In 2015, EY opened its first global Security Operations Centre in Thiruvananthapuram, Kerala in India, and coincidentally invested $20 million over 5 years to combat the increasing threat of cybercrimes.

In 2017, EY announced that it was opening an executive support center in Tucson, Arizona, US, creating 125 new jobs. That same year, the company opened a Digital Security Operations Center, located in Muscat, Oman, to cover the EMEIA region, as part of a $10 million investment.

In 2018, EY opened a $4.4 million professional services center in Louisville, Kentucky, US, creating 125 new jobs, and announced that it would open an IT / tech hub in Nashville, Tennessee, US, creating 600 regional jobs.

In November 2022, it was announced EY had acquired the Sydney-headquartered data and analytics specialists, Bridge Business Consulting.

In June 2025, EY launched EY Studio+, combining its design, marketing, sales and customer-experience technology services into a business with approximately 7,000 employees.

=== Project Everest ===
The Wall Street Journal reported in May 2022 that the firm might split its accounting and advisory divisions into two new, separate businesses. The plan, referred to internally as "Project Everest" would involve the consulting business completing an initial public offering, the proceeds of which would be used to compensate partners at the new, separate auditing company. The firm's debt has proven to be an internal obstacle to the split.

The debt is mostly owed to former partners of EY, taking the form of what the Wall Street Journal characterized as "effectively an unfunded pension plan". Would-be partners of the new accounting firm have expressed reservations as their descendant firm, the smaller of the new organizations, would presumably absorb most of the debt.

On 5 September 2022, the firm announced that partners would vote on whether to split EY into two businesses. EY's member firms in China, Hong Kong, Macau, and Israel stated that they would not split. Rival firms, such as KPMG and Deloitte, have said they do not intend to imitate EY.

In March 2023, Julie Boland, head of EY US, stated in a webcast that the split would be temporarily paused amid internal debate over the proportioning of its tax service line among the proposed consulting and assurance spinoffs.

The firm cancelled Project Everest as the US portion of the firm withdrew its support for the split in April 2023. Preparing and planning for the split cost EY $600 million.

In July 2024, Janet Truncale succeeded Carmine Di Sibio as EY's global chair and chief executive. Following the collapse of Project Everest, Truncale introduced a strategy known as "All in", which retained EY's combined audit and consulting structure while emphasizing greater collaboration across its global network and investment in areas including business transformation, managed services and sustainability.

== Global structure ==
EY is one of the Big Four accounting firms, alongside Deloitte, KPMG, and PricewaterhouseCoopers. EY's global network has more than 700 offices and provides services in more than 150 countries and territories, with approximately 400,000 professionals worldwide. The firm is organized geographically into the following areas: Europe, Middle East, India and Africa; the Americas; and Asia-Pacific.

In 2018, the company underwent a transformation of some of its region borders, primarily the union of its CIS region (operating in the former Soviet Union) and the CEE region (Eastern Europe) to create the CESA block.

In 2025, EY consolidated its global structure from 18 geographic regions to 10. The reorganization was reported in March 2025 as part of a broader restructuring under global chair and CEO Janet Truncale, and took effect on 1 July 2025. The 10 regions operate through EY's three geographic Areas: the Americas; Asia-Pacific; and Europe, Middle East, India and Africa (EMEIA).

== Services ==
Over the course of its operations, EY has transformed its business model and diversified its pool of offered services. Over the course of the last decade, EY has substantially altered its business approach in order to offer a more comprehensive scope of services. This has mainly been attributed to an intensified competition in the existing market of professional services, and competition in new markets: investment banking and strategic consultancy. According to data published in 2019, EY's principal service lines include Assurance, Consulting, Strategy and Transactions, and Tax:

- Assurance: comprises Financial Audit, Financial Accounting Advisory Services, Climate Change and Sustainability Services (CCaSS), Forensic & Integrity Services, and technology risk services. CCaSS includes climate change, environmental, social and governance (ESG) matters, environment, health and safety, and sustainability reporting and finance.
- Tax: includes business tax, international tax, transaction tax, tax compliance, transfer pricing, indirect tax, tax technology and transformation, and services relating to global trade and tax policy.
- Consulting: comprises Business Consulting, Technology, and People Consulting.
- Managed Services: provides ongoing services in areas including finance, tax, risk, cybersecurity, and technology, combining professional services with technology and standardized processes.
- Strategy and Transactions: provides strategy, transaction and corporate finance services through EY-Parthenon, including corporate and growth strategy, transaction strategy, mergers and acquisitions, due diligence, integration and divestment, restructuring and turnaround, valuation, forecasting, and economic analysis. In March 2025, EY brought its entire Strategy and Transactions practice under the EY-Parthenon brand, expanding EY-Parthenon from approximately 9,000 professionals to more than 25,000 across 150 countries. In 2017, the Financial Oversight and Management Board for Puerto Rico retained Ernst & Young as a financial adviser during Puerto Rico's debt restructuring under the PROMESA process.
- People Advisory Services: HR, immigration, workforce mobility programs
- EY Private: provides assurance, tax, strategy and other professional services to entrepreneurs, privately held businesses and their owners, including family enterprises and family offices.
- Core Business Services: business development, marketing, legal, risk management

EY revenues by service line – in US$ millions
	FY25	FY24	FY23	FY22	FY21	FY20	FY19	FY18	FY17	FY16
Assurance	17,877	17,299	15,096	14,282	13,567	12,821	12,646	12,534	11,632	11,301
Tax	12,707	12,080	12,088	11,240	10,467	9,765	9,460	8,995	8,179	7,751
Consulting	16,400	15,606	16,104	13,795	11,135	10,467	10,236	9,621	8,526	7,846
Strategy and transactions	6,235	6,236	6,066	5,848	4,790	4,181	4,052	3,622	3,067	2,728
Total	53,219	51,221	49,354	45,165	39,959	37,234	36,394	34,772	31,404	29,626

=== Purpose and values ===
EY states its purpose to be "building a better working world", and says its work is intended to create long-term value for clients, people and society while building trust and confidence in capital markets. The firm's stated values include integrity, respect, teaming and inclusiveness. Its Global Code of Conduct establishes standards for business conduct and groups its principles into five areas: working with colleagues and clients, professional integrity, objectivity and independence, and protection of data, information and intellectual property.

EY has expanded its use of artificial intelligence across its consulting business through its EY.ai platform. In 2025, the Financial Times reported that increased demand for AI-related consulting contributed to growth in EY's consulting division, which generated US$16.4 billion in revenue during the fiscal year.

== Disputes ==
=== Audit practices ===
EY has been involved in many accounting scandals: Bank of Credit and Commerce International (1991), Informix Corporation (1996), Sybase (1997), Cendant (1998), One.Tel (2001), AOL (2002), HealthSouth Corporation (2003), Chiquita Brands International (2004), Lehman Brothers (2010), Sino-Forest Corporation (2011), Olympus Corporation (2011), Stagecoach Group (2017), Wirecard (2020), Luckin Coffee (2020) and NMC Health (2020).

In 2004, Ernst & Young was criticized for forming a lucrative business arrangement with one of its audit clients, PeopleSoft, thus creating a conflict of interest. As a result, the firm was barred by the SEC from accepting any new publicly traded companies as audit clients for six months.

In April 2004, Equitable Life, a UK life assurance company, sued EY after nearly collapsing but abandoned the case in September 2005. EY described the case as "a scandalous waste of time, money and resources for all concerned."

In 2009, EY, the former auditors of Sons of Gwalia, agreed to a $125m settlement over their role in the gold miner's collapse in 2004. Ferrier Hodgson, the company's administrator, had claimed that EY was negligent over the accounting of gold and dollar hedging contracts. However, EY said that the proposed settlement was not an admission of any liability.

Following allegations by the Securities and Exchange Commission (SEC) that EY had committed accounting fraud in its work auditing the books of Bally Total Fitness, EY reached two settlements in 2008, including a fine of $8.5 million.

EY Hong Kong resigned from the audit of Standard Water Ltd when it emerged that, although EY Hong Kong had signed off the audit, it had been effectively outsourced to the affiliate in mainland China, which had received 99.98% of the fee. This was important because shareholders have less confidence in mainland auditors and because audit papers on the mainland are subject to state secrecy laws and can be withheld from outside regulators.

EY's quality and risk management leader for Greater China even testified in the Court of First Instance that he was not sure whether there was a formal agreement covering the relationship between the two EY entities. The court case in 2013 came as US regulators were taking an interest in similar cases of accounting fraud in mainland China.

In September 2016, the SEC fined EY US US$9.3 million for multiple failures, including an auditor's romantic involvement with a client. Another partner on the team, who was auditing a different public company, also became romantically involved with its chief accounting officer.

In October 2016, EY settled with the SEC because they were unable to detect financial statement fraud that was committed by the Weatherford tax department. Weatherford misstated their financial statements by manipulating the income tax line item in their financials. EY was Weatherford's independent auditors when the fraud was perpetrated.

In October 2016, Mozilla stopped accepting WebTrust audits from Ernst & Young Hong Kong due to their failure "to detect multiple issues they should have detected" during their audits of WoSign.

In February 2017, in response to questions regarding misissued certificates, Symantec stated they would no longer accept WebTrust audits from E&Y Korea and E&Y Brazil due to deficiencies in these audits.

According to The Wall Street Journal, in 2019, EY had audited WeWork, the office-space company that "nearly collapsed after fumbling a planned initial public offering".

In April 2020, a former partner and whistleblower was awarded $10.8 million by the high court in London, for ethical misconduct by EY in an audit of Kaloti Jewellery International, Dubai-based gold refiner. EY appealed the decision, but then dropped the appeal in March 2021.

In 2020, EY failed to uncover $2 billion that was missing at Wirecard AG, a German fintech payment processing company. This resulted in a lawsuit being filed against EY in June 2020. An investigation by the Bundestag revealed in April 2021 that EY's audits of defunct payments group Wirecard suffered from serious shortcomings over a period of years.

EY also failed to identify $300 million in "fabricated sales" in their 2020 audit of the coffee chain Luckin Coffee and $5 billion in "undisclosed debt" at NMC Health and Finablr.

In August 2021, EY US agreed to pay US$10 million as part of a settlement with the SEC related to charges of auditor independence misconduct perpetrated by several of its partners to secure Sealed Air as a client.

In August 2021, the UK's accounting regulator, the Financial Reporting Council (FRC), fined EY UK £3.5 million (US$4.8 million) for failing to challenge financial statements in its 2017 audit of UK transport company, Stagecoach Group. In addition, the auditing engagement partner Mark Harvey was sanctioned and fined £100,000. EY's fine was subsequently cut to £2.2 million for admitting to the failings, with Harvey's fine reduced to £70,000 for the same reason.

In December 2021, EY filed a criminal complaint against unknown persons with Munich prosecutors relating to the alleged leak of a classified German parliamentary report relating to its role in the collapse of payments firm, Wirecard, to the German newspaper, Handelsblatt.

In April 2022, the administrators of NMC Health filed a $2.5 billion lawsuit against EY, alleging negligence during its work on NMC's accounts spanning a seven-year period.

In 2023, the Public Company Accounting Oversight Board reported on four EY Canada audits conducted in 2022 and found that half of them had "multiple deficiencies".

In April 2023, the German Abschlussprüferaufsichtsstelle (APAS), the federal watchdog responsible for the oversight on auditors, asserted that EY had committed violations of duty on its Wirecard mandate and prohibited the company from accepting new audit mandates from companies in the German stock exchange for two years.

In December 2024, a lawsuit was filed against EY, accusing it of assisting the UAE-based Brooge Petroleum and Gas Investment Company FZE in defrauding investors during a 2019 special-purpose acquisition company (SPAC) merger. It alleges that Brooge fabricated financial data through fake invoices, customers and affiliated parties and forged 30-80% of its revenues between 2018 and 2020. EY allegedly supported Brooge's scheme by "issuing unqualified audit opinions". The lawsuit was filed by a group of Brooge Energy shareholders, who accused EY of fraud and violations of the Securities Exchange Act of 1934. The plaintiffs were seeking damages, interest, and legal fees.

In April 2025, the company was fined £4.9 million by the FRC for "serious breaches in standards" in its audits of Thomas Cook, which collapsed in 2019.

=== Exam cheating by audit professionals ===
In June 2022, the SEC fined the firm US$100 million "for cheating by its audit professionals on exams required to obtain and maintain Certified Public Accountant (CPA) licenses, and for withholding evidence of this misconduct from the SEC's Enforcement Division during the Division's investigation of the matter". EY admitted "the facts underlying the SEC's charges" and the penalty is a record imposed on a US audit firm. The Canadian Public Accountability Board announced that it would investigate whether EY's Canadian arm was involved in similar practices.

=== Investment banking ===
In 2009, during the Anglo Irish Bank hidden loans controversy, EY was criticised by politicians and the shareholders of Anglo Irish Bank for failing to detect large loans to Seán FitzPatrick, its chairman, during its audits. The Irish Government had to subsequently take full ownership of the Bank at a cost of €28 billion. The Irish Chartered Accountants Regulatory Board appointed John Purcell to investigate. EY said that it "fundamentally disagrees with the decision to initiate a formal disciplinary process" and that "there has been no adverse finding made against EY in respect of the audit of Anglo Irish Bank."

In 2009, EY agreed to pay US$200m out of court to settle a negligence claim by the liquidators of Akai Holdings. Separately, the firm was accused of falsifying and doctoring documents it presented to defend against the negligence claim by Akai's liquidators. In another separate lawsuit, a former EY senior partner from 1984 to 1991, Cristopher Ho, and his listed company, Grande Holdings, paid over US$100m to Akai creditors to settle Akai's liquidators' claim that Ho conspired with Ting to strip assets from Akai.

Police raided the Hong Kong office and arrested an EY partner who had been an audit manager on the Akai account from December 1997, although audit documents had been doctored dating back to 1994. Akai was said to be the firm's largest client for most of the 1990s from Hong Kong. The EY partner for the Akai account between 1991 and 1999, David Sun Tak-kei, faced no charges and went on to become co-managing partner for EY China.

A few months later, EY settled a similar claim of up to HK$300m from the liquidators of Moulin Global Eyecare, an audit client of the Hong Kong affiliate between 2002 and 2004. The liquidators described the Moulin accounts as a "morass of dodginess".

The Valukas Report, issued in 2010, charged that Lehman Brothers engaged in a practice known as repo 105 and that EY, Lehman's auditor, was aware of it. EY was accused of professional malpractice regarding the lack of disclosure of Lehman's repo 105 practice in Lehman's public filings. New York prosecutors announced in 2010 that they have sued the firm. David Goldfarb, a Lehman CFO who concocted the repo 105 balance sheet window dressing technique, was a former senior partner of EY.

EY said that its last audit of Lehman Brothers was for the fiscal year ending 30 November 2007 and that Lehman's financial statements were fairly presented in accordance with Generally Accepted Accounting Principles. In March 2015, EY settled Lehman-related lawsuits with municipalities in New Jersey and California.

In 2014, tax arrangements negotiated by EY for The Walt Disney Company, Koch Industries, Skype, and other multinational corporations became public in the so-called Luxembourg Leaks. The disclosure of these, and other tax arrangements, led to controversial discussions about tax avoidance.

In 2015, EY's member firm in Japan, Ernst & Young ShinNihon, was fined ¥2.1 billion (US$17.4 million) for failing to spot irregularities since 2008 while auditing its client Toshiba, which was Japan's worst accounting scandal in years. The firm was also suspended from taking up new business for three months. An official from Japan's Financial Services Agency (FSA) stated that "there was a grave breach of duty". The firm's CEO and chairman, Koichi Hanabusa, stepped down the following month to take responsibility and monthly salaries for 19 employees were cut from 20 per cent to 50 per cent.

In an unusual move, the FSA publicly named seven accountants involved in the audit who were accused of failing to exercise due caution and signing off on false financial documents. The FSA also said that the "firm’s operations were deeply improper". ShinNihon was, at the time, Japan's biggest accounting firm, with 3,500 certified accountants and 4,000 clients.

ShinNihon audited about 960 listed companies in Japan, the most among the Big Four, as reported in 2015. ShinNihon had audited Toshiba for over 60 years and the firm had around 70 staff serving Toshiba before the accounting scandal broke.

In 2017, Ernst & Young Baltic, member of the EY network, was accused of using the emission assumptions of highly polluting EURO II trucks (manufactured before 2001) to falsely increase the socio-economic benefits of the new railway for the period 2026–2055 by 3 billion euros in the Rail Baltica Cost-Benefit Analysis. The total mistakes amounted to more than 4 billion euros and constituted 20% of the total socio-economic benefit of the Rail Baltica. Correction of the mistakes made the project unfeasible. EY has refused to provide any comments to the media regarding the public accusations.

== Employment culture ==
=== Alumni ===
Notable EY alumni include Sheila Fraser, who served as Auditor General of Canada from 2001 to 2011, and Suzette Kent, who served as Chief Information Officer of the United States.

=== Sexist training program ===
In October 2019, HuffPost broke a story about a New Jersey "Power-Presence-Purpose" training seminar purportedly to empower female employees, but which was, as characterized by HuffPost, "full of out of touch advice". Women were told to concentrate on their appearance, not to show too much skin, and not to speak too much. One participant said it was basically a "women bashing" exercise. "You have to offer your thoughts in a benign way...You have to be the perfect Stepford wife... It felt like they were being turned into someone who is super-smiley, who never confronts anyone" she said. In 2021, EY agreed to pay the state of New Jersey $100,000 and set up a $500,000 scholarship following its investigation of the program to resolve claims EY broke state law against discrimination.

=== Working rights ===
In April 2021, EY's second-year auditor staff in their Barcelona office sent an email to their line managers to complain about the long hours that they had to work, which were sometimes reaching 84 working hours per week.

=== Elizabeth Broderick & Co. Culture Review ===
In July 2023, an independent culture review by the former Australian sex discrimination commissioner Elizabeth Broderick was released after being commissioned by EY following the suicide of an auditor in the Sydney office in August 2022. Over 4,500 participants from the Australian and New Zealand EY offices participated through online surveys, interviews, written submissions, and group listening sessions. The report revealed that 15% of EY employees have experienced instances of either bullying, sexual harassment, or racism.

The report also detailed the long working hours, with approximately two in five employees considering quitting due to long work hours and 46% of respondents reporting that their health has been negatively affected due to the long hours. The culture review revealed that over 31% of EY employees worked over 51 hours per week routinely, and 11% of EY employees worked over 61 hours per week routinely.

In April 2024, EY apologized for its workplace culture and said it has started a "time-owed-in-lieu pilot" and is "making strong progress" on other report recommendations.

=== Toxic work culture in India ===
Anna Sebastian Perayil, a 26-year-old chartered accountant, died in July 2024, four months after starting work at the Pune, India, EY office. Her family alleged that her death was due to stress caused by overwork, presenteeism and exhaustion. Her death led to nationwide outrage and debate on toxic work culture in India.

Shobha Karandlaje, the Minister of State for the Ministry of Labour and Employment, said in a post on X that her ministry has officially taken up the complaint. Other political leaders, including the Maharashtra Deputy Chief Minister Ajit Pawar and Bharatiya Janata Party leader Rajeev Chandrasekhar, expressed their sadness and support for a probe.

== Sponsorships ==
Ernst & Young is involved in many sponsorships, including its World Entrepreneur of the Year Award program, held in over 60 countries.

The awards are an annual award program sponsored by Ernst & Young in recognition of entrepreneurship. Founded in 1986 in Milwaukee as a single award, the program now runs in all 50 U.S. states and in more than 60 countries.

At the country and territory levels, programs begin with nomination of entrepreneurs who demonstrate specific criteria. The award may be given to multiple individuals per year. For example, in the U.S. and other countries, there are multiple regional and category winners, spanning fields such as retail and consumer products, technology, family business, energy, chemical and mining, food products and services, real estate, hospitality, and construction, financial services, digital media, and transformational ventures. However, in each country, only one company and its leader(s) are recognized as the overall award recipient.

Since 1986, over 10,000 founders, CEOs, and business leaders have received awards.

=== Entrepreneurial Winning Women ===
Entrepreneurial Winning Women is a global EY initiative that identifies women founders and supports them to help them scale. Launched in 2008, the program has expanded to 55 countries and graduated over 1,000 entrepreneurs.

In North America and Canada, eligibility focuses on founding CEOs who retain substantial ownership and lead privately held businesses.

Notable alumnae include Sheri Jacobson (UK & Ireland, class of 2018), Brianne West (Asia–Pacific, class of 2020), Paula Fray (Africa, class of 2015), Jamie Kern Lima (North America, class of 2013) and Amy Buckner Chowdhry (North America, class of 2011).

=== Art and media ===
Ernst & Young serves as the independent accounting firm for the Primetime Emmy Awards, overseeing the tabulation of ballots and safeguarding the results before they are announced.

EY UK sponsors exhibitions of works by famous artists, such as Cézanne, Picasso, Bonnard, Monet, Rodin and Renoir. This includes Maharaja: the Splendour of India's Royal Courts at the Victoria and Albert Museum. EY UK also sponsors the ITEM club.

In 2013, EY UK set up the National Equality Standard (NES), an initiative developed for business which sets clear equality, diversity and inclusion (EDI) criteria against which companies are assessed. The National Equality Standard (NES) is currently the only industry recognized national standard for EDI in the UK. In 2014, it set up EY Foundation, a UK charity that aims to support young people and entrepreneurs.

In addition, EY sponsors the educational children's show Cyberchase on PBS Kids under the PBS Kids GO! television brand, in an effort to improve mathematics literacy in children.

=== Sports ===
On 8 September 2011, Rio 2016 made the announcement that EY would be an official sponsor of the 2016 Summer Olympics to be held in Brazil, as the exclusive provider of professional services – consulting and auditing – for the Rio 2016 organizing committee.

EY was an Official Partner to the 2012 and the 2014 Ryder Cups, partners with the British and Irish Lions, and has a longstanding relationship with the 2011 Tour de France winner Cadel Evans.

In April 2019, EY announced a two-year-long collaboration with USA Rugby, where EY would act as their Official Principal Partner. The partnership was focusing on digital and technological transformations, as well as innovating and growing the game in the US, while specifically mentioning an overhaul of USA Rugby's diversity and inclusiveness program.

== Recognition ==
EY has received workplace and employer recognition from independent publications and organizations, including Fortune, People, LinkedIn, Vault, and Seramount. The firm has appeared on Fortune's "100 Best Companies to Work For" list annually since the list's inception in 1998.

Since 1986, the firm has hosted the EY Entrepreneur of the Year program, an annual awards initiative established in the United States that has since expanded internationally to recognize business founders and executives.

== See also ==
- Accounting networks and associations
- Big Four accounting firms
- Clarkson Gordon & Co (Canada)
