= Wayne M. Perry =

American businessman

35th President of the Boy Scouts of America
- In office May 30, 2012 – May 22, 2014
- Preceded by: Rex Tillerson
- Succeeded by: Robert Gates

Personal details
- Born: January 3, 1950 (age 76) New York City, U.S.

Wayne M. Perry (born January 3, 1950) is a retired American businessman and former national president of the Boy Scouts of America (2012–2014).

== Business ==
After graduating from the University of Washington with a bachelor's degree, Perry earned his Juris Doctor degree from Northwestern School of Law of Lewis & Clark College and an L.L.M. in Taxation from New York University School of Law. He is a member of the Washington State Bar Association.

Perry started at McCaw Cellular Communications Inc. in 1976. He served as legal officer, General Counsel, and Executive Vice President before becoming President in 1985. After McCaw's merger with AT&T Wireless Services in September 1994, Perry served as AT&T's Vice-Chairman. He joined NEXTLINK Communications as chief executive officer and vice-chairman before co-founding Edge Wireless in 1999. Already partly owned by AT&T, it was acquired in its entirety by AT&T in 2008. In 2012, Perry was inducted into the Wireless Hall of Fame for his role in the wireless industry.

Perry is a minority owner of the Seattle Mariners baseball team.

He has taught at the University of Washington Business School as a visiting professor for classes on mergers and acquisitions.

== Scouting ==
Perry joined the Boy Scouts of America as a Cub Scout. He has served as Scoutmaster, district chairman, Explorer advisor, Cubmaster, and president of the Chief Seattle Council as well as of the Western Region.

Perry has been awarded the Silver Buffalo Award, Silver Antelope Award, Silver Beaver Award and District Award of Merit. He is a member of the Order of the Arrow and earned the Wood Badge advanced training recognition. He is a Troop Guide on Wood Badge course W1-609-15-2 in the Chief Seattle Council. In addition, Perry was awarded the BSA Heroism Award. He is also a holder of the World Organization of the Scout Movement's Bronze Wolf Award.

He was appointed to the National Executive Board, and became the International Commissioner of the BSA in May 2006. Perry served as a member of the World Committee until July 2008, having been selected to replace Steve Fossett in September 2006. He was elected the National President of the BSA by the National Executive Board in May 2012. He served as National President of the BSA until May 2014, at which time he was succeeded by Robert Gates.

== Personal ==
Perry is married to Christine and has four sons, Kevin, Gregory, Douglas, and Justin. He is a member of the Church of Jesus Christ of Latter-day Saints.

Boy Scouts of America
Preceded by Rex Tillerson	National president 2012–2014	Succeeded by Robert Gates
