= Randall L. Stephenson =

Telecommunications business executive

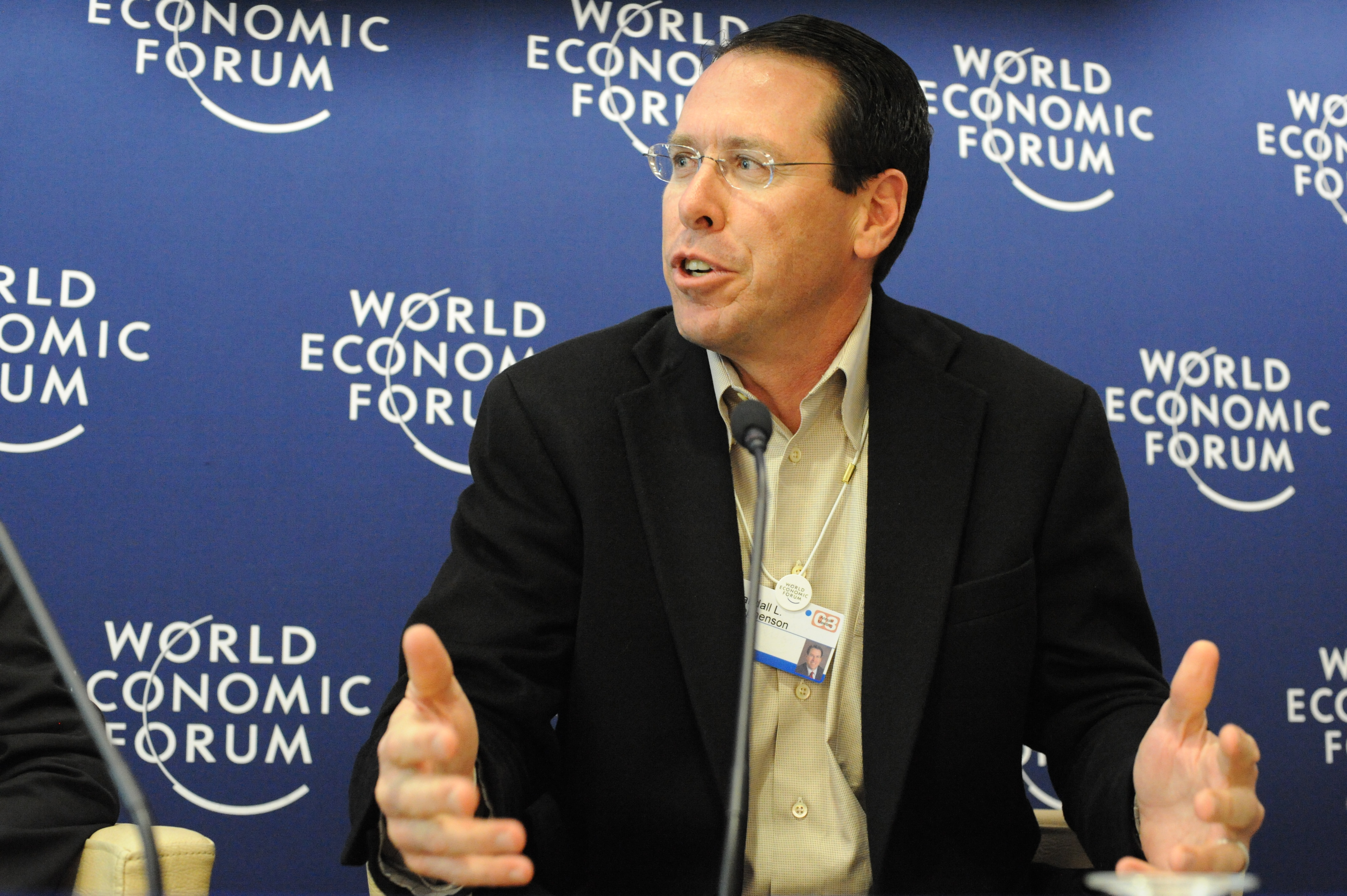

37th National President of Scouting America
- In office 2016–2018
- Preceded by: Robert Gates
- Succeeded by: Jim Turley

Personal details
- Born: Randall Lynn Stephenson; April 22, 1960 (age 66) Oklahoma City, Oklahoma, U.S.
- Spouse: Lenise
- Children: 2
- Education: University of Central Oklahoma (BS); University of Oklahoma (MAcc)
- Occupation: Executive Chairman, AT&T

Randall Lynn Stephenson (born April 22, 1960) is an American retired telecommunications executive. He was chairman and chief executive officer (CEO) of AT&T Inc. from 2007 to 2020. He was national president of Scouting America from 2016 to 2018.

== Biography ==
Stephenson earned a Bachelor of Science in Accounting from the University of Central Oklahoma and a Master of Accountancy from the University of Oklahoma, then began his career in 1982 with Southwestern Bell Telephone (SBC). Late in the 1980s through 1990s, he held executive positions at the company, including oversight of SBC's investment in Telefonos de Mexico (Telmex), where, according to Bloomberg, he was mentored by Carlos Slim. In July 2001, he was appointed senior vice president and chief financial officer for SBC, helping the company reduce its net debt from $30 billion to near zero by early 2004. From 2003 to 2004, Stephenson was chairman of the board of directors for Cingular Wireless. In 2004, he was named chief operating officer of SBC and also appointed by President Bush as National Security Telecommunications Advisory Committee.

Stephenson continued as COO following SBC's acquisition of AT&T in 2005, responsible for all wireless and wireline operations at AT&T. In April 2007, AT&T announced Stephenson would succeed retiring Edward Whitacre as CEO and would be chairman and CEO. In 2008, Stephenson helped AT&T launch AT&T Aspire and led their "It Can Wait" campaign.

Stephenson was chairman of the Business Roundtable from 2014 to 2016.

In September 2016, Stephenson gave a speech regarding race relations at AT&T’s annual Employee Resource Group conference in Dallas. An employee posted a video of the speech to YouTube, in which Stephenson asked attendees to make a greater effort to understand each other and communicate better through a compelling witness defending Black Lives Matter despite racial tensions in the United States.

During his tenure as CEO, AT&T acquired DirecTV for $49 billion in July 2015 and Time Warner for $85 billion in June 2018. According to Drew FitzGerald of The Wall Street Journal, Stephenson has "transformed the phone company he inherited into one of the world's biggest entertainment companies." However, AT&T also made an unsuccessful bid to acquire T-Mobile USA.

In July 2020, Stephenson retired as CEO. He was succeeded by then-COO John Stankey. At the time Stephenson announced his departure, it was acknowledged that the acquisitions of DirectTV and Time Warner had by this point resulted in a massive debt burden of $200 billion for the company making it the most indebted non-financial company in the world, forcing the company to cut back on its capital investments and a 50% cut in dividends. In December 2020, the Financial Times said Stephenson's "legacy has been stained by poor acquisitions".

== Scouting ==
He was the 37th National President of the Boy Scouts of America, wafrom 2016 until 2018. Stephenson, as well as fellow board member Jim Turley, CEO of Ernst & Young, publicly opposed the BSA's practice of banning openly gay Scouts and stated their intention "to work from within the BSA Board to actively encourage dialogue and sustainable progress."

== PGA Tour Policy Board ==
Stephenson was from 2012 to 2023 on the policy board of the PGA Tour. He resigned in July 2023, citing “serious concerns” about the tour's partnership with the Saudi Arabian Public Investment Fund. In his resignation letter, Stephenson said the framework of the deal “is not one that I can objectively evaluate or in good conscience support, particularly in light of the U.S. intelligence report concerning Jamal Khashoggi in 2018.”

== Personal life ==
Stephenson maintains homes in Preston Hollow, Dallas, Olmos Park, and San Antonio, Texas, and Teton Village, Wyoming. Stephenson is a member of the Council on Foreign Relations.

== See also ==
- List of chief executive officers

Business positions
Preceded by Edward Whitacre Jr.	AT&T CEO; 2007-2020	Succeeded by John Stankey

Boy Scouts of America
Preceded by Robert Gates	President of the Boy Scouts of America; 2016–2018	Succeeded by Jim Turley
