= List of recipients of the Silver Buffalo Award =

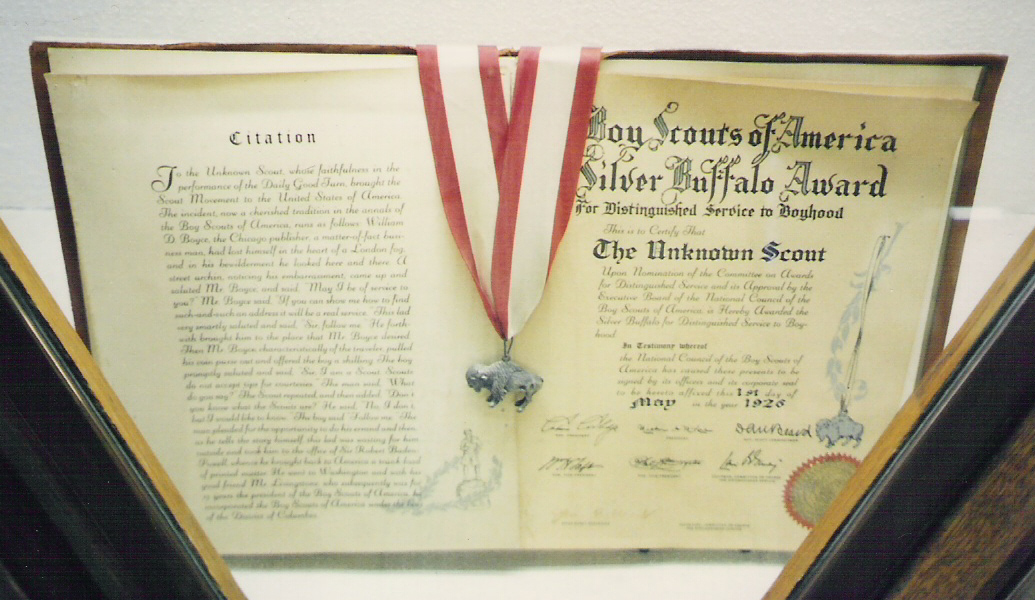
Silver Buffalo award and citation presented to the Unknown Scout

This list of recipients of the Silver Buffalo Award includes people who have been awarded the highest commendation of Scouting America. Since the Silver Buffalo Award was first awarded in 1926, 904 have been presented as of 2026.

== 1926 ==
During the first presentation in 1926, twenty-two awards were presented in a particular order determined by Chief Scout Executive James E. West.

Recipient	Notability	References
Robert Baden-Powell	Lieutenant-general in the British Army, writer and founder of the Scout Movement	^{[a]}
Unknown Scout	Unknown member of the British Boy Scout Association who inspired W. D. Boyce to form the BSA	^{[a]}
William D. Boyce	Publisher and entrepreneur, founder of the BSA and the Lone Scouts of America	^{[a]}
Colin H. Livingstone	Financier, first president of the BSA	^{[a]}
James J. Storrow	Investment banker instrumental in forming General Motors, third president of GM and second president of the BSA (posthumous award)	^{[a]}
Daniel Carter Beard	Illustrator, author, social reformer, founding pioneer of the BSA and the first National Commissioner	^{[a]}
Ernest Thompson Seton	Noted author, wildlife artist, founder of the Woodcraft Indians, founding pioneer of the BSA and first Chief Scout; heavily influenced Baden-Powell in his formation of Scouting	^{[a]}
Edgar M. Robinson	Senior secretary in the YMCA, co-founder of the BSA	^{[a]}
Lee F. Hanmer	Member of the Russell Sage Foundation, secretary of the BSA Committee of Organization	^{[a]}
George Wood Wingate	U.S. Army General, lawyer, and 25-year president of the National Rifle Association	^{[a]}
Joseph Lee	Volunteer social worker, author, and president of the Playground and Recreation Association; father of the playground idea	^{[a]}
Howard S. Braucher	Social worker, chair of the first committee on organization for the BSA, and Secretary of the Playground and Recreation Association	^{[a]}
Mortimer L. Schiff	Banker, philanthropist, vice-president of the BSA, member of the World Scout Committee, recipient of the Bronze Wolf, later president of the BSA	^{[a]}
Milton A. McRae	Publisher, co-founder of the Scripps-McRae League of newspapers, later the third president of the BSA	^{[a]}
Frank Presbrey	Author, editor, and dean of advertising; charter member of BSA executive board and chair of committee on Boys' Life	^{[a]}
George Dupont Pratt	Advocate of forest conservation and wildlife protection; charter member of BSA executive board, chair of camping committee, and vice-chair of national court of honor	^{[a]}
John Sherman Hoyt	Manufacturer, vice chair of war work council YMCA; charter member of BSA executive board and chair of finance committee	^{[a]}
Jeremiah Jenks	Political economist, educator, and author; charter member of BSA executive board and chair of educational committee; formulated the Scout oath and law	^{[a]}
William D. Murray	Lawyer, author and member of the YMCA boys' work committee; charter member of BSA executive board and chair of editorial board	^{[a]}
G. Barrett Rich	Charter member of BSA executive board and chair of the national committee on badges, awards, and Scout requirements	^{[a]}
James E. West	Lawyer, advocate of children's rights, first professional Chief Scout Executive of the BSA	^{[a]}
George J. Fisher	Physician, leader in the fields of youth development and physical fitness with the YMCA, early proponent of volleyball, deputy Chief Scout Executive and national Scout commissioner	^{[a]}

== 1927 ==
Recipient	Notability	References
William Howard Taft	United States Solicitor General, United States federal judge, Governor-General of the Philippines, Secretary of War, twenty-seventh President of the United States, the tenth Chief Justice of the United States and first honorary president of the BSA	^{[a]}
Hubert S. Martin	Director of the International Bureau	^{[a]}
William Adams Welch	Engineer and environmentalist	^{[a]}
Stuart W. French	Business executive, organizer of Region 12	^{[a]}
Bolton Smith	Banker, director of the Interracial Bureau of the BSA	^{[a]}
Walter W. Head	Banker and insurance executive who founded the General American Life Insurance Company (MetLife), served as president of the BSA for nearly twenty years	^{[a]}
Brother Barnabas McDonald F.S.C	Founder of the Columbian Squires of the Knights of Columbus education director of the Catholic Bureau of the BSA and director of the National Catholic Committee on Scouting	^{[a]}

== 1928 ==
Recipient	Notability	References
The Unknown Soldier	American soldiers who have died without their remains being identified	^{[a]}
Charles Lindbergh	Pioneering aviator and recipient of the Medal of Honor	^{[a]}
Walter von Bonstetten	President of the Swiss Federation of Boy Scouts, served on the World Scout Committee, recipient of the Bronze Wolf	^{[a]}
Arthur N. Cotton	Proponent of the YMCA High-Y Clubs	^{[a]}
Clarence H. Howard	Industrialist, philanthropist and early benefactor of the Junior Chamber of Commerce	^{[a]}
Charles D. Velie	Proponent of Scouting for rural youth	^{[a]}
William H. Cowles	President and publisher of The Spokesman-Review and The Spokane Chronicle; BSA regional chairman	^{[a]}

== 1929 ==
Recipient	Notability	References
Calvin Coolidge	Lawyer, governor of Massachusetts, twenty-ninth Vice President and thirtieth President of the United States, honorary president of the BSA	^{[a]}
Richard Evelyn Byrd	Pioneering polar explorer, aviator, rear admiral in the United States Navy, recipient of the Medal of Honor and the Congressional Life Saving Medal	^{[a]}
Wilbert E. Longfellow	Commodore of the U. S. Volunteer Life Saving Corps, early proponent of swimming instruction and of the Schafer method of artificial respiration	^{[a]}
John H. Finley	Educator and founder of the Junior American Red Cross	^{[a]}
Howard F. Gillette	Banker	^{[a]}
Charles D. Hart	Physician	^{[a]}
Edward, Prince of Wales	Scouting enthusiast; later King Edward VIII of Great Britain	^{[a]}

== 1930 ==
Recipient	Notability	References
Herbert Hoover	Mining engineer, humanitarian administrator, United States Secretary of Commerce, thirty-first President of the United States, honorary president of the BSA	^{[b]}
James Earl Russell	Educator	^{[b]}
Franklin D. Roosevelt	Senator and governor of State of New York, assistant Secretary of the Navy, member of the BSA National Committee, co-founder of Ten Mile River Scout Camp; later thirty-second President of the United States and honorary president of the BSA	^{[b]}
James Austin Wilder	Sailor and artist who expanded the Sea Scouting program, first Chief Sea Scout	^{[b]}
Charles L. Sommers	Business executive, chairman of Region 10 of the BSA; the Charles L Sommers Canoe Base was later named in his honor	^{[b]}
Charles C. Moore	Engineer	^{[b]}
Lewis Warrington Baldwin	Railroad president, regional chairman of the BSA	^{[b]}

== 1931 ==
Recipient	Notability	References
Herbert Stuart Pakington, 4th Baron Hampton	Chief Commissioner of the Boy Scout Association	^{[b]}
Griffith Ogden Ellis	Publisher of American Boy Magazine	^{[b]}
Lewis Gawtry	Banker	^{[b]}
George Welch Olmsted	Founder of the Long Island Lighting Company, chairman of the BSA National Camping Committee	^{[b]}
Victor F. Ridder	Newspaper publisher, leader in Catholic Scouting, co-founder of National Catholic Committee on Scouting	^{[b]}
Robert P. Sniffen	Merchandising consultant, chairman of the BSA Committee on Supply Service	^{[b]}
Mell R. Wilkinson	Manufacturer, member of the BSA National Executive Board	^{[b]}

== 1932 ==
Recipient	Notability	References
Dwight F. Davis	Tennis player who founded the Davis Cup, served as Secretary of War and as Governor General of the Philippines	^{[b]}
William Edwin Hall	Lawyer, president of the Boys Clubs of America	^{[b]}
Alfred W. Dater	Utilities executive; first chairman of the Sea Scout Committee, namesake of the Alfred W. Dater Council (merged into the Connecticut Yankee Council)	^{[b]}
Barron Collier	Advertising entrepreneur who became the largest landowner and developer in Florida	^{[b]}
Frank A. Bean	Business executive and advocate of rural Scouting	^{[b]}
Hermann W. Merkel	Landscape architect, forester at the Bronx Zoo, chief forester of the Bronx River Parkway	^{[b]}

== 1933 ==
Recipient	Notability	References
Vincent Massey	Canadian envoy to the U.S., philanthropist; later Governor General of Canada	^{[b]}
Martin H. Carmody	Supreme Knight of the Knights of Columbus	^{[b]}
John P. Wallace	Publisher and advocate of rural Scouting	^{[b]}
Cyrus Adler	Educator, Jewish religious leader and scholar, chairman of the Jewish Committee on Scouting	^{[b]}
Reginald H. Parsons	BSA council president in Seattle, member of the Executive Board of the BSA and philanthropist	^{[b]}
John A. McGregor	Region 11 Scouter	^{[b]}

== 1934 ==
Recipient	Notability	References
Newton D. Baker	Mayor of Cleveland, Ohio, Secretary of War	^{[b]}
Paul P. Harris	Lawyer and founder of Rotary International	^{[b]}
John M. Phillips	Conservationist, recipient of the Silver Wolf	^{[b]}
Theodore Roosevelt Jr.	Assistant Secretary of the Navy, governor of Puerto Rico, Governor-General of the Philippines, chairman of the board of American Express Company, and vice-president at Doubleday, later brigadier general in the United States Army and recipient of the Medal of Honor	^{[b]}
Charles E. Cotting	Philanthropist	^{[b]}
Frederic Kernochan	Judge	^{[b]}
George Albert Smith	Apostle, later Eighth President of the Church of Jesus Christ of Latter-day Saints	^{[b]}

== 1935 ==
Recipient	Notability	References
Booth Tarkington	Pulitzer Prize–winning novelist and dramatist	^{[b]}
Amos Alonzo Stagg	Collegiate football coach, later inducted into the College Football Hall of Fame as both a player and a coach	^{[b]}
Daniel A. Tobin	Banker and co-founder of the Columbian Squires	^{[b]}
Fielding H. Yost	Lawyer, author, businessman, football coach, Scout commissioner	^{[b]}
Calvin Derrick	Penologist and founder of Institutional Scouting	^{[b]}
R. Tait McKenzie	Sculptor, Scouter, scholar-athlete, surgeon, soldier, and physical educator, created the sculpture known as the "Ideal Scout"	^{[b]}

== 1936 ==
Recipient	Notability	References
Frederick Russell Burnham	American adventurer and Boer War chief of scouts from whom Baden-Powell based some of the activities of the Boy Scouting program; taught scoutcraft to Baden-Powell	^{[b]}
Hugh S. Cumming	Surgeon General of the United States	^{[b]}
Lawrence Locke Doggett	First president of Springfield College, member of the YMCA group that first met with Boyce	^{[b]}
Charles Horace Mayo	Medical practitioner and co-founder of the Mayo Clinic	^{[b]}
George Edgar Vincent	President of the University of Minnesota and the Religious Education Association, adviser to Scouting for health and safety	^{[b]}
John Skinner Wilson	Chief of Gilwell Park, director of the Boy Scouts International Bureau, later honorary president of the Boy Scouts International Committee and recipient of the Bronze Wolf	^{[b]}

== 1938 ==
Recipient	Notability	References
Thomas E. Wilson	President of Wilson & Company (Wilson Sporting Goods), promoter and supporter of 4-H	^{[b]}
William Temple Hornaday	Zoologist and conservationist	^{[b]}
George E. Allen	Presidential representative for the 1937 National Scout Jamboree	^{[b]}
Frank Cody	Superintendent of the Detroit public schools	^{[b]}
Frank G. Hoover	Industrialist	^{[b]}
Connie Mack	Professional baseball player, manager, and team owner	^{[b]}
C. B. Smith	Physician and proponent of rural Scouting	^{[b]}
John A. Stiles]	Canadian Scouter, recipient of the Silver Wolf	^{[b]}
William Chalmers Covert	Presbyterian minister	^{[b]}
Marshall Field	Founder of Marshall Field's	^{[b]}
Elbert K. Fretwell	Academic and early leader in the field of youth development through recreation and extracurricular activity, later the second Chief Scout Executive of the BSA and then Chief Scout	^{[b]}
Heber J. Grant	Seventh President of the Church of Jesus Christ of Latter-day Saints	^{[b]}
Francis C. Kelley	Bishop of Oklahoma	^{[b]}
John Mott	Leader of the YMCA and the World Student Christian Federation, founder of the World Council of Churches, later a recipient of the Nobel Peace Prize	^{[b]}
Norman Rockwell	Iconic artist, art editor for Boys' Life	^{[b]}

== 1940 ==
Recipient	Notability	References
Edward Roberts Moore	Roman Catholic priest, professor, social worker and author; national director of the Catholic Committee on Scouting	^{[c]}
George Washington Truett	Minister and international youth leader	^{[c]}
Eugene D. Nims	President of Southwestern Bell, director of the First National Bank of St. Louis, member of the Executive Board of the BSA, later president of the St. Louis Council	^{[c]}

== 1941 ==
Recipient	Notability	References
C. Ward Crampton	Scientist, author and physical fitness advocate	^{[c]}
Homer Folks	Statesman	^{[c]}
Edgar Rickard	Mining engineer	^{[c]}
J. E. H. Stevenot	Last president of the BSA Philippine Council, one of the founders and first president of the Boy Scouts of the Philippines	^{[c]}
Daniel A. Poling	Minister, editor of the Christian Herald, president of Christian Endeavor, father of Clark V. Poling, who later died on the troop transport Dorchester as one of the Four Chaplains	^{[c]}

== 1942 ==
Recipient	Notability	References
Frank Orren Lowden	Lawyer and Governor of Illinois	^{[c]}
Ragnvald A. Nestos	Lawyer, Governor of North Dakota, pioneer in Rural Scouting	^{[c]}
Frank Phillips	Founder of Phillips Petroleum Company	^{[c]}
Bernard J. Sheil	Auxiliary Bishop of Chicago, founder of Catholic Youth Organization	^{[c]}
William Clay Smoot	Banker	^{[c]}

== 1943 ==
Recipient	Notability	References
J. Edgar Hoover	Lawyer and Director of the Federal Bureau of Investigation	^{[c]}
Harry C. Knight	Business executive and philanthropist	^{[c]}
John M. Schiff	Banker; later national president of the Boy Scouts of America	^{[c]}
William L. Smith	Surgeon and author	^{[c]}
Frank W. Wozencraft	Businessman, lawyer and former mayor of Dallas, Texas	^{[c]}

== 1944 ==
Recipient	Notability	References
Oscar H. Benson	Iowa educator and co-founder of 4-H	^{[c]}
Charles Evans Hughes	Governor of New York, United States Secretary of State, Associate Justice and Chief Justice of the United States	^{[c]}
Elbridge W. Palmer	Publisher, advocate for youth with special needs	^{[c]}
William C. Menninger	Neuropsychiatrist, co-founder of the Menninger Foundation and member of the BSA National Sea Scout Committee	^{[c]}
Philip L. Reed	Business executive and member of the BSA Advisory Council	^{[c]}
Eddie Rickenbacker	World War I fighter ace and Medal of Honor recipient, race car driver and automotive designer, a government consultant in military matters and a pioneer in air transportation	^{[c]}
Arthur Somers-Cocks, 6th Baron Somers	Chief Scout of the British Commonwealth and Empire	^{[c]}
Thomas J. Watson	President of IBM	^{[c]}

== 1945 ==
Recipient	Notability	References
Francis W. Hatch	Publicist, chairman of the BSA Boys' Life Committee	^{[c]}
Amory Houghton	United States Ambassador to France, manufacturer and vice president of the BSA; later president of the BSA	^{[c]}
Paul W. Litchfield	American industrialist, president and chairman of the board Goodyear Tire & Rubber Company, developed first Air Scout squadron	^{[c]}
Earl C. Sams	President of JCPenney, chairman of the BSA Business Division Committee; later founded the Gladys Porter Zoo	^{[c]}

== 1946 ==
Recipient	Notability	References
John M. Bierer	Business executive, chairman of the BSA National Cubbing Committee	^{[c]}
William Joseph Campbell	Chief Judge of the United States District Court for the Northern District of Illinois, promoter of Scouting for Catholic boys	^{[c]}
Walt Disney	Film producer, director, screenwriter, voice actor, animator, entrepreneur, and philanthropist	^{[c]}
Dwight D. Eisenhower	General of the Army and Supreme Commander of Allied Expeditionary Forces in Europe during World War II; later President of the United States and honorary president of the BSA	^{[c]}
Raymond F. Low	Business executive, Sea Scouting commodore of Region Eight	^{[c]}
Wheeler McMillen	Journalist; editor; advocate for rural Scouting	^{[c]}
Chester W. Nimitz	Chief of the Navy's Bureau of Navigation, Commander in Chief of Pacific Forces for the United States and Allied forces during World War II, Chief of Naval Operations	^{[c]}
Vilhjalmur Stefansson	Canadian Arctic explorer, ethnologist and author	^{[c]}
Frank L. Weil	Lawyer, co-founder of the USO, founder and chairman of the National Jewish Committee on Scouting, president of the National Jewish Welfare Board	^{[c]}

== 1947 ==
Recipient	Notability	References
Bernard Baruch	Financier, statesman, and presidential adviser	^{[c]}
Manuel Camus	Lawyer, senator in the Philippine Senate, Jurist, president of the Y.M.C.A. of the Philippine Islands, chairman in the Philippine Red Cross, Scout commissioner in the BSA Philippine Council, president of the Boy Scouts of the Philippines	^{[c]}
Cleveland E. Dodge	President of the Near East Foundation, chairman of the board of trustees of Teachers College of Columbia University, chairman of the International Board of the YMCA	^{[c]}
Perrin C. Galpin	educator and child-health advocate, Secretary of the American Relief Administration and of the Commission for Relief in Belgium relief missions after World War I, director of the Commission for Polish Relief during World War II	^{[c]}
William H. Pouch	Industrialist and civic leader	^{[c]}
Paul Allman Siple	Antarctic explorer and geographer, author, Eagle Scout	^{[c]}
Francis Spellman	Archbishop of New York	^{[c]}
R. Douglas Stuart	Manufacturer; later United States Ambassador to Canada	^{[c]}

== 1948 ==
Recipient	Notability	References
Irving Berlin	Composer and lyricist, composer of God Bless America	^{[c]}
Belmore Browne	Artist, writer, explorer, hunter, and mountain climber	^{[c]}
Cherry Logan Emerson	Chemical and materials engineer and educator	^{[c]}
Reuhen Brooks Hale	Merchant and civic leader	^{[c]}
Robert F. Payne	Educator and author	^{[c]}
Thomas Corbett, 2nd Baron Rowallan	Chief Scout of the British Commonwealth and Empire	^{[c]}
Wade Warren Thayer	Attorney and author, Scout commissioner in Hawaii	^{[c]}

== 1949 ==
Recipient	Notability	References
David W. Armstrong	Executive Director of the Boys Clubs of America	^{[c]}
Sheldon Clark	Business executive; National Sea Scout Commodore	^{[c]}
Richard J. Cushing	Archbishop of Boston; lecturer; author; civic leader; head of all youth work of the Catholic Church in the US	^{[c]}
W. V. M. Fawcett	Business executive; civic leader; Scouter	^{[c]}
Charles R. Hook	Industrialist; advocate of Junior Achievement; Scouter	^{[c]}
Luther A. Weigle	Educator; dean; Bible scholar; pioneer Scouter	^{[c]}

== 1950 ==
Recipient	Notability	References
Harry Messiter Addinsell	Financier; churchman; Treasurer of the Boy Scouts of America	^{[d]}
Kenneth K. Bechtel	Business executive; Vice President of the Boy Scouts of America	^{[d]}
Charles Kettering	Engineer; manufacturer; philanthropist; innovator	^{[d]}
Irving Langmuir	Nobel Prize-winning scientist; pioneer Scouter	^{[d]}
Byrnes MacDonald	Business executive; worker for underprivileged youth	^{[d]}
Owen Josephus Roberts	Jurist; public servant; longtime Scouter	^{[d]}
Arthur A. Schuck	Chief Scout Executive of the Boy Scouts of America	^{[d]}
Lowell Thomas	Explorer; author; news commentator; Scouter	^{[d]}
Harry S. Truman	Thirty-third President of the United States of America	^{[d]}
Milburn Lincoln Wilson	National Director of 4-H Clubs; Scouter	^{[d]}

== 1951 ==
Recipient	Notability	References
Ralph Bunche	Educator; Nobel Peace Prize winner; Scouter	^{[d]}
James Lippitt Clark	Explorer; author; sculptor; conservationist; Scouter	^{[d]}
Edgar Guest	Writer; poet; Boys' Club official; friend to youth	^{[d]}
Raymond W. Miller	Publicist; Scouter; advocate of rural Scouting	^{[d]}
D. C. Spry	Chief Executive Commissioner, Canadian General Council of the Boy Scouts Association	^{[d]}
James H. Douglas Jr.	Attorney; public servant; longtime Scouter	^{[d]}
Henry Smith Richardson	Manufacturing chemist; longtime Scouter	^{[d]}
Jack P. Whitaker	Manufacturer; Scouter; President of the American Humanics Foundation	^{[d]}

== 1952 ==
Recipient	Notability	References
Julius Ochs Adler	Journalist; patriot; veteran Scouter	^{[d]}
Roy Chapman Andrews	Explorer; zoologist; museum director; author	^{[d]}
Frank Boyden	Acclaimed headmaster of Deerfield Academy	^{[d]}
Harmar D. Denny Jr.	Attorney; Congressman; longtime Scouter	^{[d]}
Gale F. Johnston	Banker; civic leader; philanthropist; Scouter	^{[d]}
Carlos P. Romulo	Author; soldier; diplomat; co-founder of Boy Scouts of the Philippines	^{[d]}
Louis John Taber	Farmer; granger; exponent of rural Scouting; Scouter	^{[d]}

== 1953 ==
Recipient	Notability	References
Alton Fletcher Baker	Journalist; publisher; civic leader; Scouter	^{[d]}
Henry B. Grandin	Business executive; Scouter; host to Third National Jamboree	^{[d]}
Ross L. Leffler	Business executive; civic leader; veteran Scouter	^{[d]}
Charles Francis McCahill	Newspaper executive; philanthropist; Scouter	^{[d]}
David O. McKay	Ninth President of the Church of Jesus Christ of Latter-day Saints	^{[d]}

== 1954 ==
Recipient	Notability	References
William H. Albers	Business executive; philanthropist; Scouter	^{[d]}
Ellsworth H. Augustus	Banker; civic leader; Scouter	^{[d]}
Ezra Taft Benson	U.S. Secretary of Agriculture; thirteenth president of the Church of Jesus Christ of Latter-day Saints	^{[d]}
Philip David Bookstaber	Rabbi; scholar; exponent of Scouting for Jewish boys	^{[d]}
Norton Clapp	Business executive; civic leader; donated Mount Baldy to Philmont	^{[d]}
J. M. T. Finney Jr.	Surgeon; churchman; civic leader; veteran Scouter	^{[d]}
Richard Oliver Gerow	Bishop of Natchez, Mississippi; longtime Scouter	^{[d]}
E. Urner Goodman	Church executive; pioneer Scouter; founder of Order of the Arrow	^{[d]}
George Lloyd Murphy	Producer; actor; publicist; Scouter	^{[d]}
Nathan Marvin Ohrbach	Business executive; philanthropist; Scouter	^{[d]}
Dewitt Wallace	Magazine founder; editor; publisher; philanthropist	^{[d]}

== 1955 ==
Recipient	Notability	References
Charles Dana Bennett	Author; rural consultant; publicist; Scouter	^{[d]}
Rex Ivan Brown	Utility executive; civic leader; veteran Scouter	^{[d]}
William Durant Campbell	Naturalist; world traveler; Eagle Scout; Scouter	^{[d]}
Francis John Chesterman	Utilities executive; civic leader; Scouter	^{[d]}
Leonard Kimball Firestone	Industrialist; churchman; civic leader; Scouter	^{[d]}
Charles William Froessel	Jurist; churchman; civic leader; Scouter	^{[d]}
Robert Tyre Jones Jr.	Attorney; business executive; sportsman; champion athlete	^{[d]}
Lewis Edward Phillips	Manufacturer; philanthropist; Scouter	^{[d]}
Frank Chambless Rand Jr.	Business executive; publisher; civic leader; Scouter	^{[d]}
Thomas J. Watson Jr.	Business executive; civic leader; philanthropist; Scouter	^{[d]}

== 1956 ==
Recipient	Notability	References
Ivan Allen Jr.	Executive; banker; engineer; civic leader; Scouter	^{[d]}
Gerald F. Beal	Banker; financier; cultural and civic leader; Scouter	^{[d]}
Daniel W. Bell	Banker; public servant; community leader; Scouter	^{[d]}
Hugh Moss Comer	Textile manufacturer; philanthropist; Scouter	^{[d]}
Walter F. Dillingham	Executive; builder; philanthropist; statesman; Scouter	^{[d]}
Whitney Haskins Eastman	Business executive; engineer; scientist; Scouter	^{[d]}
William Harrison Fetridge	Editor; publisher; executive; community leader; Scouter	^{[d]}
William Jansen	Educator; author; churchman; administrator; Scouter	^{[d]}
Guy Lee Noble	National 4-H Club executive; humanitarian	^{[d]}
Harry Lloyd Schaeffer	Railroad executive; Scouter	^{[d]}
Henry F. Schricker	Statesman; banker; editor; pioneer Scouter	^{[d]}
Harold Stassen	Educator; humanitarian; statesman; author; Scouter	^{[d]}
Edwin Joel Thomas	Industrialist; civic leader; humanitarian; Scouter	^{[d]}

== 1957 ==
Recipient	Notability	References
Harold Roe Bartle	Attorney; civic leader; humanitarian; Scouter	^{[d]}
Brooks Hays	Congressman; lawyer; humanitarian; Scouter	^{[d]}
Walter David Heller	Business executive; civic leader; philanthropist; Scouter	^{[d]}
Henry Cabot Lodge	Journalist; national and international statesman	^{[d]}
Abram L. Sachar	Educator; author; historian; university president	^{[d]}
Herman Lee Turner	Clergyman; humanitarian; civic leader; Scouter	^{[d]}
Kenneth Dale Wells	Economist; educator; president of Freedoms Foundation at Valley Forge	^{[d]}

== 1958 ==
Recipient	Notability	References
Robert Bernard Anderson	Secretary of the Treasury; lawyer; educator; Scouter	^{[d]}
John Hopkinson Baker	Conservation executive; governmental adviser	^{[d]}
Hubert Hardison Coffield	Industrialist; rancher; churchman; humanitarian; Scouter	^{[d]}
Nathan Dauby	Business executive; civic leader; philanthropist; Scouter	^{[d]}
Jackson Dodds	Banker; Scouter; recipient of Silver Wolf and Bronze Wolf	^{[d]}
John Randolph Donnell	Business executive; civic leader; Scouter	^{[d]}
Robert Newcomb Gibson	Business executive; lumberman; Scouter	^{[d]}
Frank Brittain Kennedy	Investment dealer; churchman; executive; Scouter	^{[d]}
Edward Leroy Kohnle	Business executive; churchman; cultural leader Scouter	^{[d]}
Sol George Levy	Import-export business executive; community leader; Scouter	^{[d]}
John Norton Lord	Business executive; community leader; Scouter	^{[d]}
James Stewart	Actor; combat aviator; Scouter	^{[d]}

== 1959 ==
Recipient	Notability	References
Milo William Bekins	Business executive; community leader; Scouter	^{[d]}
George Michael Dowd	Clergyman; domestic prelate; youth leader; Scout chaplain	^{[d]}
Irving J. Feist	Business executive; community leader; Scouter	^{[d]}
Roger Stanley Firestone	Manufacturing executive; humanitarian; Scouter	^{[d]}
Bob Hope	Cinema, radio, and television comedian; humanitarian	^{[d]}
Jeffrey Louis Lazarus	Business executive; community leader; Scouter	^{[d]}
Walter Lee Lingle Jr.	Business executive; community leader; Scouter	^{[d]}
George Magar Mardikian	Restaurateur; author; philanthropist; Scouter	^{[d]}
Pliny Hunnicut Powers	Educator; Deputy Chief Scout Executive of Boy Scouts of America	^{[d]}
Charles Dudley Pratt	Attorney; civic leader; pioneer Scouter	^{[d]}
Joseph Frederic Wiese	Industrial executive; community leader; veteran Scouter	^{[d]}

== 1960 ==
Recipient	Notability	References
Joe C. Carrington	Insurance executive; rancher; churchman; youth worker; Scouter	^{[e]}
Thomas C. Clark	Associate Justice of the United States Supreme Court; humanitarian; veteran Scouter	^{[e]}
James Thomas Griffin	Business executive; humanitarian; churchman; Scouter	^{[e]}
Alfred Gruenther	President of the American National Red Cross; Supreme Allied Commander in Europe 195356; Scouter	^{[e]}
Roy E. Larsen	Publishing executive; civic leader; humanitarian	^{[e]}
Robert John Lloyd	Business executive; community leader; Scouter	^{[e]}
Alexander White Moffat	Business executive; yachtsman; author; Scouter	^{[e]}
Clifford A. Randall	Lawyer executive; humanitarian; past President of Rotary International	^{[e]}
Norman Salit	Rabbi; attorney; humanitarian; veteran Scouter	^{[e]}

== 1961 ==
Recipient	Notability	References
Wyeth Allen	Educator; community leader; longtime Scouter	^{[e]}
Carl Otto Janus	Business executive; civic leader; veteran Scouter	^{[e]}
Richard E. McArdle	Educator; public servant; conservationist; Scouter	^{[e]}
Charles B. McCabe Jr.	Publisher; broadcasting executive; veteran Scouter	^{[e]}
Lauris Norstad	Supreme Allied Commander, Europe (SHAPE); promulgator of Scouting	^{[e]}
William T. Spanton	Co-founder of Future Farmers of America; Scouter	^{[e]}
Delbert L. Stapley	Business executive; church Leader; veteran Scouter	^{[e]}
Charles M. White	Industrialist; civic leader; Youth Worker; Scouter	^{[e]}
Robert E. Wood	Retired Army General; Business executive; Philanthropist; Veteran Scouter	^{[e]}

== 1962 ==
Recipient	Notability	References
Bruce C. Clarke	Commander-in-Chief of United States Army, Europe; veteran Scouter	^{[e]}
Zenon Clayton Raymond Hansen	Business executive; civic leader; Eagle Scout; Scouter	^{[e]}
Carl Hayden	Member of United States Senate; veteran Scouter	^{[e]}
Wayne Andrew Johnston	Railroad executive; humanitarian; longtime Scouter	^{[e]}
Thomas J. Keane	Naval Officer in Two World Wars; Veteran Scouter	^{[e]}
John Cook Parish	Business executive; civic leader; Scouter	^{[e]}
John Thurman	Camp Chief of Gilwell Park; recipient of Silver Wolf and Bronze Wolf	^{[e]}
Carl Vinson	Member, United States House of Representatives; friend of Scouting	^{[e]}
Clarence E. Williams	Physician; Surgeon; Jamboree Medical Officer; Scouter	^{[e]}

== 1963 ==
Recipient	Notability	References
Erwin D. Canham	Editor; Author; Broadcasting Commentator; Humanitarian	^{[e]}
L. Osmond Crosby	Industrialist; Community Leader; Scouter	^{[e]}
Herold C. Hunt	Educator; Author; Consultant; Scouter	^{[e]}
Walter H. Judd	Statesman; Missionary; civic leader; Veteran Scouter	^{[e]}
John T. Kimball	Utilities executive; civic leader; Scouter	^{[e]}
Harold B. Lee	Eleventh president of the Church of Jesus Christ of Latter-day Saints; business executive; educator; Scouter	^{[e]}
Douglas MacArthur	Corporation chairman; General of the Army; recipient of the Medal of Honor	^{[e]}
Jack C. Vowell	Business executive; engineer; civic leader; veteran Scouter	^{[e]}
Frederick M. Warburg	Banker; Philanthropist; Worker for Youth; Scouter	^{[e]}

== 1964 ==
Recipient	Notability	References
A. Frank Bray	Jurist; civic leader; Friend to Youth; Scouter	^{[e]}
Albert L. Cole	Publisher; President, Boys' Clubs of America; Philanthropist	^{[e]}
Lyndon B. Johnson	Thirty-sixth President, United States of America	^{[e]}
Ralph W. McCreary	Industrialist; civic leader; Veteran Scouter	^{[e]}
Robert Moses	Public Servant; Builder; Friend to Youth; Scouter	^{[e]}
Ephraim Laurence Palmer	Educator; Author; Conservationist; Veteran Scouter	^{[e]}
Thomas F. Patton	International Industrialist; Ccivic leader; Scouter	^{[e]}
Gilbert R. Pirrung	Agriculturist; Churchman; World Scouter	^{[e]}
Howard Tellepsen	Business Leader; Churchman; Scouter	^{[e]}

== 1965 ==
Recipient	Notability	References
Irving Ben Cooper	Jurist; Humanitarian; Friend to Youth	^{[e]}
Austin T. Cushman	Merchandising executive; Community Leader; Scouter	^{[e]}
Harry J. Delaney	Business Leader; Churchman; Scouter	^{[e]}
Royal Firman Jr.	Business, Cultural, Community, and Church Leader; Scouter	^{[e]}
John Glenn	Colonel, United States Marine Corps (Ret.); astronaut; Scouter	^{[e]}
Harry J. Johnson	Physician; educator; administrator; Scouter	^{[e]}
Harry G. McGavran	Surgeon; community leader; humanitarian; Scouter	^{[e]}
David Sarnoff	Industrialist; communications expert; veteran Scouter	^{[e]}
Jo. S. Stong	Community Leader; Scouting Enthusiast	^{[e]}
Gustavo J. Vollmer	Engineer; Venezuelan and World Scouter	^{[e]}

== 1966 ==
Recipient	Notability	References
Richard W. Darrow	Publicist; civic leader; Eagle Scout; Scouter	^{[e]}
John Henry Fischer	Educator; civic leader; Eagle Scout; Scouter	^{[e]}
Charles Zachary Hardwick	Business executive; humanitarian; Scouter	^{[e]}
Lewis Blaine Hershey	Lieutenant General, United States Army; Director, Selective Service; Scouter	^{[e]}
Basil O'Connor	Lawyer; public servant; humanitarian; friend to youth	^{[e]}
Philip Henry Powers	Engineer; educator; pioneer Scouter	^{[e]}

== 1967 ==
Recipient	Notability	References
Paul G. Benedum	Business executive; community leader; Scouter	^{[e]}
Sterling B. Doughty	Financial and management consultant; world Scouter	^{[e]}
Harold Keith Johnson	Chief of Staff, United States Army; educator; Scouter	^{[e]}
Otto Kerner Jr.	Governor of the State of Illinois; Scouter	^{[e]}
Biggie Munn	Athletic director; coach; friend of youth; Scouter	^{[e]}
Crawford Rainwater	Business executive; community leader; Scouter	^{[e]}
Vittz-James Ramsdell	Business executive; community leader; Scouter	^{[e]}
Howard A. Rusk	Physician; educator; innovator; humanitarian	^{[e]}
Dwight J. Thomson	Business leader; veteran Scouter; world Scouter	^{[e]}
William Westmoreland	Commander, U.S. Military Assistance Command, Vietnam; CG, U.S. Army, Vietnam; Eagle Scout; Scouter	^{[e]}

== 1968 ==
Recipient	Notability	References
John Cody	Archbishop of Chicago; recipient of the Silver Beaver; energetic Scouter	^{[e]}
John G. Detwiler	Industrialist; churchman; recipient of the Silver Beaver and Silver Antelope; BSA National Executive Board member	^{[e]}
Robert T. Gray	Physician; Eagle Scout; medical officer at many national and world Jamborees	^{[e]}
Arthur Z. Hirsch	Veteran Scouter; recipient of the Silver Beaver and Silver Antelope	^{[e]}
John F. Lott	Rancher; world Scouter; recipient of the Silver Beaver and Silver Antelope	^{[e]}
William L. Schloss	Banker; community leader; recipient of the Silver Beaver	^{[e]}
James E. Webb	Lawyer; businessman; diplomat; educator; administrator, National Aeronautics and Space Administration	^{[e]}

== 1969 ==
Recipient	Notability	References
John M. Budd	Executive; champion of Youth; dedicated Scouter	^{[e]}
Arleigh Burke	Military leader; patriot; distinguished Scouter	^{[e]}
James F. Burshears	Imaginative Scouter	^{[e]}
Scott Carpenter	Aquanaut; astronaut; friend of Scouting	^{[e]}
Vince Lombardi	Professional football coach; friend of youth	^{[e]}
John W. H. Miner	Manufacturer; community leader; world Scouter	^{[e]}
James E. Patrick	Banker; community leader; devoted Scouter	^{[e]}
Robert W. Reneker	Executive; humanitarian; devoted Scouter	^{[e]}
John W. Starr	Executive; faithful Scouter	^{[e]}
Nathan Eldon Tanner	Churchman; executive; veteran Scouter	^{[e]}

== 1970 ==
Recipient	Notability	References
Neil Armstrong	Astronaut; first man to walk on the Moon	^{[f]}
Francisco Bueso	Puerto Rico Chamber of Commerce Director; champion of Scouting	^{[f]}
Antonio C. Delgado	Philippines business executive; world Scouter	^{[f]}
Laurence C. Jones	Educator; author; servant of youth	^{[f]}
Aryeh Lev	Rabbi; chaplain; dedicated Scouter	^{[f]}
Leo Perlis	Organized labor official; humanitarian; friend of Scouting	^{[f]}
Bryan S. Reid Jr.	Investment banker; community leader; devoted Scouter	^{[f]}
William H. Spurgeon III	Children's hospital executive; father of special-interest exploring	^{[f]}

== 1971 ==
Recipient	Notability	References
William G. Connare	Bishop; Scouter; champion of Scouting	^{[f]}
Elbert R. Curtis	Executive; community and church leader; veteran Scouter	^{[f]}
Thomas Stephens Haggai	Gifted public speaker; ordained minister; patriot; Scouter	^{[f]}
August F. Hook	Business executive; community leader; dedicated Scouter	^{[f]}
William R. Jackson	Executive; devoted Scouter; friend of youth	^{[f]}
Fred C. Mills	Outstanding Scouter; retired director of Health and Safety Service, Boy Scouts of America	^{[f]}
Arch Monson Jr.	Patron of the arts; humanitarian; executive	^{[f]}
Richard Nixon	Thirty-seventh President of the United States of America	^{[f]}
Leon Sullivan	Humanitarian; peoples' champion	^{[f]}

== 1972 ==
Recipient	Notability	References
Louis R. Bruce Jr.	U.S. Commissioner of Indian Affairs; champion of Scouting	^{[f]}
Harvey C. Christen	Aircraft company executive; civic leader; devoted Scouter	^{[f]}
Louis G. Feil	Consulting engineer; promoter of Camping and Order of the Arrow	^{[f]}
Edwin H. Gott	Corporate executive; community leader; vigorous promoter of exploring	^{[f]}
Donald P. Hammond	Business executive; civic leader; Scouting enthusiast	^{[f]}
Albert M. Jongeneel	Retired rancher; dedicated Scouter	^{[f]}
Arthur L. Jung Jr.	Business executive; servant of youth; international Scouter	^{[f]}
Prime F. Osborn III	Company president; friend of youth; advocate of Scouting	^{[f]}
George W. Pirtle	Consulting geologist; independent oil producer; philanthropist; benefactor of Scouting	^{[f]}
Penn W. Zeigler	Business executive; humanitarian; veteran Scouter	^{[f]}

== 1973 ==
Recipient	Notability	References
Ernie Banks	Baseball great; inspiration for boys; faithful Scouter	^{[f]}
Joseph A. Brunton Jr.	Servant of youth; former Chief Scout executive	^{[f]}
Victor T. Ehre	Company president; community leader; dedicated Scouter	^{[f]}
Donald H. Flanders	Company founder and president; distinguished Scouter	^{[f]}
E. K. Jamison	Company president; devoted Scouter	^{[f]}
Max I. Silber	Company president; loyal Scouter; benefactor of students	^{[f]}
Osborne K. Taylor	Retired corporate executive; veteran Scoutmaster; champion of Scouting	^{[f]}
J. Kimball Whitney	Company president; friend of youth; veteran Scouter	^{[f]}

== 1974 ==
Recipient	Notability	References
Stephen A. Derby	Retired banker; civic leader; faithful Scouter	^{[f]}
James E. Johnson	Corporate board chairman; former Assistant Secretary of the Navy; distinguished Scouter	^{[f]}
Allen W. Mathis Jr.	Company board chairman; civic leader; dedicated Scouter	^{[f]}
James R. Neidhoefer	Company president; distinguished Scouter; veteran Scoutmaster	^{[f]}
Melvin B. Neisner	Company President; Community Leader; Devoted Scouter	^{[f]}
William H. Quasha	Attorney; International Scouter; Scoutmaster	^{[f]}
John K. Sloan	Attorney; Advocate of Youth; Loyal Scouter	^{[f]}
Herman Stern	Merchant; Humanitarian; Veteran Scouter	^{[f]}
Leif J. Sverdrup	Industrialist; Engineer; Zealous Scouter	^{[f]}
Wallace E. Wilson	Corporate Vice-President; Friend of Youth; Dedicated Scouter	^{[f]}

== 1975 ==
Recipient / Notability / References; Gerald Ford / Thirty-eighth President, United States of America; Symbol of Integrity; Example for Youth; Eagle Scout / ^{[f]}

== 1976 ==
Recipient	Notability	References
John T. Acree Jr.	Company Board Chairman; civic leader; Dedicated Scouter	^{[f]}
Perry Richardson Bass	Corporate Chairman and President; Community Benefactor; Distinguished Scouter	^{[f]}
Milton Caniff	Cartoonist; Humanitarian; Friend of Scouting	^{[f]}
Arthur H. Cromb	Company President; Inspirational Scouter; University Alumni Leader	^{[f]}
Thomas F. Hawkins	University Vice-President; Scouter Extraordinaire	^{[f]}
Elizabeth G. Knight	Philanthropist; Benefactor of Scouting	^{[f]}
Joseph W. Marshall	Retired Physician and Surgeon; Churchman; Faithful Scouter	^{[f]}
Louis W. Menk	Company Board Chairman; Transportation Industry Leader; Loyal Scouter	^{[f]}
Max S. Norris	Physician; Businessman; Devoted Scouter	^{[f]}
LaVern Watts Parmley	5th general president of the Primary of the LDS Church; benefactor of children; Cub Scouting advocate	^{[f]}
Simon Rositzky	Company President; conservationist; American Humanics Chairman	^{[f]}
Lester R. Steig	Educator; author; proponent of Scouting	^{[f]}

== 1978 ==
Recipient	Notability	References
L. Jadwin Asfeld	Company President; Red Cross Leader; Distinguished Scouter	^{[f]}
Jimmy Carter	Thirty-ninth President, United States of America; Defender of Human Rights; Friend of Youth	^{[f]}
Alec Chesser	Corporate Leader; Man of Stature; Devoted Scouter	^{[f]}
Dorothy Feist	Humanitarian; Philanthropist; Scouting 'First Lady'	^{[f]}
Roy W. Jordan	Civil Leader; Good Citizen; Scouting Stalwart	^{[f]}
Richard W. Kiefer	Attorney; Versatile Scouter; Churchman	^{[f]}
Katsumi Kometani	Dentist; Dedicated Scouter; Advocate of Youth	^{[f]}
Thomas S. Monson	Apostle, later sixteenth president of the Church of Jesus Christ of Latter-day Saints	^{[f]}
John D. Murchison	Partner, Murchison Brothers; civic leader; Scouting proponent	^{[f]}
John D. Schapiro	International sportsman; businessman; faithful Scouter	^{[f]}
Forrest N. Shumway	Corporate executive; friend of youth; veteran Scouter	^{[f]}
Bland W. Worley	Corporate Executive; Civic Servant; Great Scouter	^{[f]}

== 1980 ==
Recipient	Notability	References
Charles T. Clayton	Executive; civic leader; dedicated Scouter	^{[g]}
William P. Clements Jr.	Governor of Texas; executive; distinguished Scouter	^{[g]}
Frank William Gay	Business executive; churchman; devoted Scouter	^{[g]}
Thomas F. Gilbane	Builder; business leader; dedicated Scouter	^{[g]}
Milton H. Gray	Lawyer; civic leader; veteran Scouter	^{[g]}
William "Green Bar Bill" Hillcourt	Green Bar Bill, the Voice of Scouting	^{[g]}
Downing B. Jenks	Corporate executive; railroader; BSA President	^{[g]}
Reuben R. Jensen	Corporate executive; distinguished Scouter	^{[g]}
Sonia S. Maguire	Humanitarian; Benefactor of Scouting	^{[g]}
J. Willard Marriott	Corporation Founder; Churchman; Benefactor of Scouting	^{[g]}
Archibald McClure	Executive; Community Servant; Loyal Scouter	^{[g]}
Henry J. Nave	Corporate executive; sportsman; faithful Scouter	^{[g]}
Gene H. Sternberg Sr.	Executive; civic leader; loyal Scouter	^{[g]}
Harry D. Thorsen Jr.	Scouts on Stamps Society International; executive	^{[g]}

== 1981 ==
Recipient / Notability / References; Arthur G. Linkletter / TV and radio personality / ^{[g]}

== 1982 ==
Recipient	Notability	References
Rodney H. Brady	Educator; Business Executive; Devoted Scouter	^{[g]}
Robert W. Briggs	Physician; community leader; dedicated Scouter	^{[g]}
Hugh C. Clayton	Architect; engineer; civic leader; veteran Scouter	^{[g]}
Francis A. Coy	Business executive; community leader; distinguished Scouter	^{[g]}
Robert H. Gaynor	Businessman; civic leader; devoted Scouter	^{[g]}
Albert V. Hartl	Business Executive; Distinguished and Veteran Scouter	^{[g]}
Peter W. Hummel	Geologist; Supporter of Higher Education; Loyal Scouter	^{[g]}
Robert J. LaFortune	Independent Oil Operator; civic leader; Dedicated Scouter	^{[g]}
Thomas C. MacAvoy	Business Executive; Community Servant; Devoted Scouter	^{[g]}
Ann W. Nally	Community Servant; Parent; Dedicated Scouter	^{[g]}
George M. Pardee Jr.	Builder; Humanitarian; Veteran Scouter	^{[g]}
Ronald Reagan	Fortieth President, United States of America; Former Governor; Friend to Youth	^{[g]}
V. J. Skutt	Corporate Executive; Lawyer; Distinguished Scouter	^{[g]}
John B. Young	Bank General Manager; civic leader; International Scouter	^{[g]}

== 1984 ==
Recipient	Notability	References
Hank Aaron	Baseball Star; Humanitarian; Friend of Scouting	^{[g]}
Monsignor Louis P. Barcelo	Clergyman; Educator; Dedicated Scouter	^{[g]}
John M. Belk	Businessman; civic leader; Veteran Scouter	^{[g]}
Robert W. Dievendorf	Friend of Youth With Special Needs; Devoted Scouter	^{[g]}
Edward C. Joullian III	Engineer; civic leader; Distinguished Scouter	^{[g]}
Spencer W. Kimball	Twelfth President of the Church of Jesus Christ of Latter-day Saints	^{[g]}
D. Loring Marlett	Public Servant; Mining, Real Estate, and Oil Executive; Humanitarian	^{[g]}
Sanford N. McDonnell	Aerospace Leader; Community Servant; Devoted Scouter	^{[g]}
Charles A. Rahmberg	Insurance Executive; Dedicated and Distinguished Scouter	^{[g]}
Ben Reifel	American Indian Leader; Public Servant; Devoted Scouter	^{[g]}
Thomas L. Tatham	Attorney; civic leader; Outstanding Scouter	^{[g]}
Rolland M. Wilkening	Engineer; Community Servant; Dedicated Scouter	^{[g]}

== 1986 ==
Recipient	Notability	References
Robert L. Backman	Church Leader; Attorney; Distinguished Scouter	^{[g]}
Harry E. Bovay Jr.	Retired Chief Executive Officer; Professional Engineer; Faithful Scouter	^{[g]}
J. R. Davidsmeyer	Corporate Executive; civic leader; Dynamic Advocate of Exploring	^{[g]}
Burl Ives	Ballad Singer and Collector of Songs; Actor; Friend of Scouting	^{[g]}
Ted L. Johnson	Company President; Community Leader; Loyal Scouter	^{[g]}
William P. McCahill	Retired Marine Officer and Historian; Advocate for People With Special Needs	^{[g]}
Charles J. Merlin	Founder of the Elbeetian Legion of Lone Scout Alumni; Editor and Publisher of Elbeetee	^{[g]}
Thomas L. Parker	Retired Business Executive; Dedicated Scouter	^{[g]}
Roger Tory Peterson	Ornithologist; Artist; Naturalist	^{[g]}
Charles M. Pigott	Company President; civic leader; Distinguished Scouter	^{[g]}
Betty F. Pilsbury	National Girl Scout President; civic leader; Advocate for Youth	^{[g]}
Eddie G. Robinson	Football Coach; Educator; Inspiration for Youth	^{[g]}

== 1988 ==
Recipient	Notability	References
William Aramony	President of United Way of America; Humanitarian; Human-Service Leader	^{[g]}
Warren E. Burger	15th Chief Justice of the United States; Teacher; Distinguished Jurist	^{[g]}
Daniel W. Derbes	Corporate Executive; Distinguished Eagle Scout; Loyal Scouter	^{[g]}
Vaughn J. Featherstone	Church Leader; Advocate for Youth; Dedicated Scouter	^{[g]}
James F. Gary	International Energy Adviser; Community Leader; Faithful Scouter	^{[g]}
John McCullough Gibson	Civic leader; Farmer; Dedicated Scouter	^{[g]}
Earl G. Graves	Corporate Head; Business Leader; Distinguished Scouter	^{[g]}
Marion D. Hanks	Church Leader; Advocate for Youth; Loyal Scouter	^{[g]}
Robert F. Harbrant	Labor Leader; civic leader; Distinguished Scouter	^{[g]}
Ben M. Hauserman	Retired Business Executive; Community Leader; Faithful Scouter	^{[g]}
Roy W. Hawkinson	Company President; Outdoorsman; Dedicated Scouter	^{[g]}
Reuben Hitchcock	Retired Business Executive; Horseman; Devoted Scouter	^{[g]}
Andrew Gerow Hodges	Retired Insurance Executive; civic leader; Dedicated Scouter	^{[g]}
William Charles McCord	Corporate Executive; Community Leader; Loyal Scouter	^{[g]}
Henry B. Murphy	Company President; civic leader; Distinguished Scouter	^{[g]}
Norman Vincent Peale	Distinguished Author; Popular Speaker; Inspiration for Youth	^{[g]}
Nancy Reagan	First Lady; civic leader; Crusader for Youth and Against Drugs	^{[g]}
Eugene F. "Bud" Reid	Company President; Petroleum Geologist; Loyal Scouter	^{[g]}
Jack B. Riffle	Insurance Executive; civic leader; Loyal Scouter	^{[g]}
Charles M. Schulz	Cartoonist; Creative Artist; Friend of Youth	^{[g]}
Marshall M. Sloane	Bank President; Community Servant; Dedicated Scouter	^{[g]}
John W. Thomas Jr.	Company President; civic leader; Faithful Scouter	^{[g]}

== 1990 ==
Recipient	Notability	References
Marian Anderson	Contralto; Concert Artist; Friend of Youth	^{[h]}
Margot Bogert	College Administrator; Community Leader; Distinguished Scouter	^{[h]}
Houston A. Brice Jr.	Builder; civic leader; Dedicated Scouter	^{[h]}
George H. W. Bush	Forty-first President of the United States; Businessman; Senior Public Official	^{[h]}
Albert E. Cahill	Aquatics Safety Instructor; Writer; Devoted Scouter	^{[h]}
Murray L. Cole	Attorney; Community Servant; Loyal Scouter	^{[h]}
Lester E. Coleman	Corporate Executive; Chemist; Devoted Scouter	^{[h]}
John R. Donnell Jr.	Independent Investor; Arts Supporter; Faithful Scouter	^{[h]}
William B. Elliott	Human Resources Director; Community Servant; Dedicated Scouter	^{[h]}
Hugh Lawson Hembree III	Executive; Community Servant; Devoted Scouter	^{[h]}
Harold S. Hook	Corporate Executive; civic leader; Distinguished Scouter	^{[h]}
Glendon E. Johnson	Corporate Executive; Church Leader; Dedicated Scouter	^{[h]}
Isidore J. Lamothe Jr.	Physician and Surgeon; Community Leader; Devoted Scouter	^{[h]}
Richard H. Leet	Oil Company Executive; Community Servant; Loyal Scouter	^{[h]}
Carl M. Marchetti	Obstetrician/Gynecologist; Community Servant; Faithful Scouter	^{[h]}
William E. Slesnick	Mathematician; Educator; Distinguished Scouter	^{[h]}
C. Travis Traylor Jr.	Private Investor; civic leader; Committed Scouter	^{[h]}
William H. Webster	CIA Director; Lawyer; Distinguished Public Servant	^{[h]}
Alfred H. Wehr	Consultant; Community Leader; Dedicated Scouter	^{[h]}
John Wooden	Former Head Basketball Coach, UCLA; Teacher; Friend of Youth	^{[h]}
Dwan Jacobsen Young	6th general president of the Primary of the LDS Church; Benefactor of Children; civic leader; Loyal Scouter	^{[h]}

== 1992 ==
Recipient	Notability	References
William L. Adams	Geologist; Oil Company Executive; Distinguished Scouter	^{[h]}
John L. Clendenin	Telecommunications Executive; civic leader; Loyal Scouter	^{[h]}
Glenn A. Cox	Retired Executive; Education Regent; Dedicated Scouter	^{[h]}
Kenneth P. Davis	Logistician; Army Reservist; Devoted Scouter	^{[h]}
Jacques E. Dubois	Businessman; civic leader; Outstanding Scouter	^{[h]}
Marian Wright Edelman	Children's Advocate; Civil Rights Leader; Friend of Youth	^{[h]}
James A. Hackney III	Professional Engineer; Executive; Dedicated Scouter	^{[h]}
Paul R. Hafer	Automotive Engineer; Inventor; Loyal Scouter	^{[h]}
Richard C. Halpern	Construction executive; Civil Engineer; distinguished Scouter	^{[h]}
Vivian Harris	Advocate for people With special needs; civic leader; dynamic Scouter	^{[h]}
William A. Hiller	Farm cooperative executive; Community Servant; Able Scouter	^{[h]}
Jim Lovell	Astronaut; Communications executive; Distinguished Eagle Scout	^{[h]}
William H. Niemannv	Horticulturist; Community Servant; Dedicated Scouter	^{[h]}
Colin Powell	Chairman of the Joint Chiefs of Staff; Army Officer; Role Model for Youth	^{[h]}
Richard N. Ross	Producer; Showman; Dedicated Scouter	^{[h]}
Gerald J. Voros	Communicator; Civic Worker; Devoted Scouter	^{[h]}

== 1993 ==
Recipient	Notability	References
William H. Gray	Minister; Legislator; Supporter of Education	^{[h]}
George R. Hill III	Educator; Researcher; Dedicated Scouter	^{[h]}
Lester G. Jones	Human Resources Consultant; executive; Loyal Scouter	^{[h]}
R. Dan Matkin	Business executive; civic leader; Devoted Scouter	^{[h]}
R. Richard Rubottom	International Consultant; Diplomat; Dynamic Scouter	^{[h]}
G. William Swisher Jr.	Corporate executive; civic leader; Distinguished Scouter	^{[h]}

== 1994 ==
Recipient	Notability	References
Thomas T. Anderson, D.C.	Doctor of Chiropractic; civic leader; Loyal Scouter	^{[h]}
Norman Ralph Augustine	Aeronautical Engineer; Author; Distinguished Scouter	^{[h]}
Richard L. Burdick	Civic leader; Devoted Scouter	^{[h]}
Clarence Gaines	Educator; Coach; Community Leader	^{[h]}
Gordon B. Hinckley	Fifteenth President of the Church of Jesus Christ of Latter-day Saints	^{[h]}
Richard P. LaRocque	Clergyman; Community Volunteer; Dedicated Scouter	^{[h]}
J.W. Marriott Jr.	Corporate executive; civic leader; Distinguished Scouter	^{[h]}
J. Patrick Ross	Business executive; civic leader; Dynamic Scouter	^{[h]}
Herbert J. Rowe	Association executive; Community Leader; Loyal Scouter	^{[h]}

== 1995 ==
Recipient	Notability	References
Ronald E. Burton	Star Athlete; Popular Speaker; Dedicated Scouter; civic leader	^{[h]}
August Busch III	Corporate executive; civic leader; Distinguished Scouter	^{[h]}
Anderson W. Chandler	Banker; civic leader; Loyal Scouter	^{[h]}
Robert A. Cunningham	Business executive; Devoted Scouter; Community Leader	^{[h]}
Jack H. Goaslind	Church Leader; Youth Adviser; Distinguished Scouter	^{[h]}
Andrew L. Lewis Jr.	Former United States Secretary of Transportation; Railroad Industry executive; Public Servant	^{[h]}
Jack Zink	Mechanical Engineer; Inventor; Dynamic Scouter	^{[h]}

== 1996 ==
Recipient	Notability	References
Ted Carlsen	Company Founder; Community Leader; Dedicated Scouter	^{[h]}
John W. Creighton Jr.	Corporate executive; civic leader; Distinguished Scouter	^{[h]}
Michael D. Harris	Attorney; Church Supporter; Devoted Scouter	^{[h]}
Frank H. Heckrodt	Retired executive; Community Servant; Loyal Scouter	^{[h]}
Gerard O. Rocque	Church Leader; Community Volunteer; Dynamic Scouter	^{[h]}
Henry A. Rosenberg Jr.	Petroleum Industry executive; civic leader; Dedicated Scouter	^{[h]}
E. W. "Bud" Wendell	Music Industry executive; Community Leader; Loyal Scouter	^{[h]}

== 1997 ==
Recipient	Notability	References
Thomas D. Allen	Attorney; Jamboree Leader; International Scouter	^{[h]}
Bill Clinton	Forty-second President of the United States of America; Governor of Arkansas; Attorney; Senior Public Official	^{[h]}
John M. Coughlin	Insurance executive; Church Leader; Dedicated Scouter	^{[h]}
Siegfred S. Kagawa	Business executive; civic leader; Dedicated Scouter	^{[h]}
Francis H. Olmstead Jr.	Engineer; Community Leader; Distinguished Scouter, National Commissioner	^{[h]}
Robert H. Reynolds	Attorney; Community Volunteer; Dynamic Scouter	^{[h]}
Samuel K. Skinner	Former United States Secretary of Transportation; Utilities executive; Loyal Scouter	^{[h]}
Evelyn T. Smith	Business executive; Community Leader; Dedicated Scouter	^{[h]}
Marvin L. Smith	Petroleum Geologist; civic leader; Devoted Scouter	^{[h]}

== 1998 ==
Recipient	Notability	References
John C. Cushman III	Real Estate executive; civic leader; Devoted Scouter	^{[h]}
Allan D. Fisher	Health Care executive; Community Leader; Dynamic Scouter	^{[h]}
Vertella S. Gadsden	Synagogue Leader; Public Speaker; Devoted Scouter	^{[h]}
Herbert T. Olson Jr.	Retired Association executive; civic leader; Devoted Scouter	^{[h]}
Edward Allan Pease	U.S. Representative; Youth Advocate; Distinguished Scouter	^{[h]}
Elliott Waite Phillips	Rancher; Philanthropist; Scouting Benefactor	^{[h]}
Ronald J. Temple	Educator; Administrator; Loyal Scouter	^{[h]}
K. Gregory Tucker	Retired Attorney; Water Safety Advocate; Dedicated Scouter	^{[h]}
Donald R. Watkins	Business executive; Community Volunteer; Distinguished Scouter	^{[h]}

== 1999 ==
Recipient	Notability	References
A. Dano Davis	Corporate executive; civic leader; Devoted Scouter	^{[h]}
Steve Fossett	Adventurer; Corporate executive; Dynamic Scouter; Philmont Ranger	^{[h]}
Edward L. Gaylord	Corporate executive; Community Servant; Dedicated Scouter	^{[h]}
Carlos R. Hamilton Jr.	Physician; Community Servant; Distinguished Scouter	^{[h]}
Loren S. Riggins Jr.	Business executive; Community Leader; Dedicated Scouter	^{[h]}
Roy S. Roberts	Corporate executive; civic leader; Loyal Scouter	^{[h]}
Janet E. Sharp	Retired Educator; Community Servant; Dedicated Scouter	^{[h]}

== 2000 ==
Recipient	Notability	References
Charles L. Bowerman	Retired Corporate executive; Former Athlete; Dedicated Scouter	^{[i]}
M. Anthony Burns	Humanitarian; Corporate executive; Dynamic Scouter	^{[i]}
Robert Gates	National Servant (later Secretary of Defense); Author; Distinguished Scouter	^{[i]}
Roger R. Hemminghaus	Corporate executive; civic leader; Loyal Scouter	^{[i]}
Louise Mandrell	Entertainer; Author; Devoted Scouter	^{[i]}
C. Dudley Pratt Jr.	Business executive; Community Servant; Dynamic Scouter	^{[i]}
Thomas E. Reddin	Government executive; civic leader; Devoted Scouter	^{[i]}
Frank G. Rubino	Physician; Community Volunteer; Dedicated Scouter	^{[i]}
Alfred S. Warren	Retired Corporate executive; Community Leader; Enthusiastic Scouter	^{[i]}
Togo D. West Jr.	Government executive; Public Servant; Distinguished Eagle Scout	^{[i]}
Edward E. Whitacre Jr.	Corporate executive; civic leader; Devoted Scouter	^{[i]}

== 2001 ==
Recipient	Notability	References
William F. "Rick" Cronk	Corporate executive; Church Leader; Energetic Scouter	^{[i]}
George F. Francis III	Community Servant; Corporate executive; Dedicated Scouter	^{[i]}
Robert T. Herres	National Servant; Retired executive; Distinguished Eagle Scout	^{[i]}
W. Walter Menninger	Physician; Civic Servant; Distinguished Eagle Scout	^{[i]}
The Oak Ridge Boys	Musicians; Businessmen; Dynamic Scouters	^{[i]}
Elmer E. Rasmuson	Philanthropist; Education Enthusiast; Devoted Scouter	^{[i]}
Harold L. "Spike" Yoh Jr.	Civic Servant; Retired Corporate executive; Loyal Scouter	^{[i]}
Zig Ziglar	Motivational Speaker; Writer; Community Servant	^{[i]}

== 2002 ==
Recipient	Notability	References
James H. Bean	Attorney; National Servant; Devoted Scouter	^{[i]}
Raymond V. Biondo	Physician; Educator; Dutiful Scouter	^{[i]}
George W. Bush	Forty-third President of the United States of America; Governor of Texas; Advocate of Youth	^{[i]}
Fred S. Faber Jr.	Engineer; Civic Servant; Energetic Scouter	^{[i]}
John Gottschalk	Executive; Community Servant; Dedicated Scouter	^{[i]}
Lee Greenwood	Musician; Humanitarian; Supportive Scouter	^{[i]}
Carl E. Stewart	U.S. Circuit Judge; Civic Servant; Loyal Scouter	^{[i]}
Milton H. Ward	Corporate executive; Arts Enthusiast; Dedicated Scouter	^{[i]}
Sue J. Weierman	Civic Volunteer; Editor; Dynamic Scouter	^{[i]}

== 2003 ==
Recipient	Notability	References
Yogi Berra	Professional Athlete; Community Servant; Supportive Scouter	^{[i]}
Donna Cunningham	Community Servant; Dedicated Leader; Dynamic Scouter	^{[i]}
Terrence P. Dunn	Chief Executive Officer; Community Servant; Enthusiastic Scouter	^{[i]}
F. Melvin Hammond	LDS General Authority and Religious Leader; Educator; Dutiful Scouter	^{[i]}
Lyle R. Knight	Executive; Business Leader; Dependable Scouter	^{[i]}
Jerrold L. Lockshin	Civic Servant; U.S. Army Veteran; Distinguished Scouter	^{[i]}
Francis R. McAllister	Corporate executive; Civic Servant; Loyal Scouter	^{[i]}
Glen McLaughlin	Venture Capitalist; Philanthropist; Loyal Scouter	^{[i]}
Jose F. Niño	Business executive; National Servant; Energetic Scouter	^{[i]}
H. Ross Perot	Philanthropist; Public Servant; Business executive; Distinguished Eagle Scout	^{[i]}
George Zambelli Sr.	Businessman; Community Volunteer; Faithful Scouter	^{[i]}

== 2004 ==
Recipient	Notability	References
George Leighton Allen Sr.	Distinguished Physician; U.S. Army Veteran; Influential Scouter	^{[i]}
John P. DesBarres	Energy executive; Arts Patron; Visionary Scouter	^{[i]}
Joseph L. Harris	Religious Leader; Urban Revivalist; Supportive Scouter	^{[i]}
Aubrey B. Harwell Jr.	Civic Leader; Legal Scholar; Devoted Scouter	^{[i]}
J. Dennis Hastert	Political Leader, Successful Coach, Youth Advocate	^{[i]}
Donald Keith Hummel	Religious Leader; Dynamic Volunteer; Inspirational Scouter	^{[i]}
R. Lawry Hunsaker	Foster Parent; Reverent Disciple; International Scouter	^{[i]}
Drayton McLane Jr.	Business Leader; Sports executive; Dedicated Scouter	^{[i]}
Jan T. Perkins	Volunteer; Attorney; Devoted Scouter	^{[i]}
Mary Ann Price	Civic Volunteer; Trainer; Tireless Scouter	^{[i]}
Robert W. Spanogle	War Veteran; Volunteer; Scouting Advocate	^{[i]}

== 2005 ==
Recipient	Notability	References
Stephen D. Bechtel Jr.	Distinguished Businessman; Community Benefactor; Student Mentor	^{[i]}
Robert A. Bedingfield	Adventurous Volunteer; Dedicated Scouter; Business Leader	^{[i]}
Donald A. Belcher	Business executive; Dedicated Volunteer; Distinguished Eagle Scout	^{[i]}
David Lloyd Briscoe	Versatile Volunteer; Tireless Scouter; Dedicated Professor	^{[i]}
Harriss A. "Hab" Butler III	Lifelong Scouter; Community Activist; Tireless Volunteer	^{[i]}
Joseph Csatari	Talented Artist; Selfless Volunteer; Inspired Scouter	^{[i]}
Gerald A. Gettelfinger	Roman Catholic Bishop of Evansville, Indiana	^{[i]}
Coleen Kent Menlove	Scouting Matriarch; Tireless Volunteer; Enthusiastic Scouter	^{[i]}
Richards Miller	Knowledgeable Scouter; Youth Coach; Distinguished Dentist	^{[i]}
Roger M. Schrimp	Distinguished Eagle Scout; Community Leader; Successful Attorney	^{[i]}
James W. Shepherd	Real Estate Investor; Diverse Volunteer; Energetic Scouter	^{[i]}

== 2006 ==
Recipient	Notability	References
W. Todd Bassett	Dedicated Church Leader; Tireless Youth Advocate; Devoted Christian	^{[i]}
Richard H. Carmona	Health Advocate; Distinguished Physician; Decorated Veteran	^{[i]}
Douglas H. Dittrick	Distinguished Businessman; Dedicated Scouter; Community Benefactor	^{[i]}
Bradley Haddock	Distinguished Corporate Lawyer; Committed Church Leader; Dedicated Scouter	^{[i]}
Peter E. Hyman	Tireless Scouting Volunteer; Community Leader; Man of God	^{[i]}
Alberto A. Muñoz II	Scouting Innovator; Advocate for Youth; Philanthropist	^{[i]}
Wayne M. Perry	Corporate Leader; Longtime Scouter; Youth Coach	^{[i]}
Samuel J. Prisk	Lifelong Scouter; Health Professional; Servant Leader	^{[i]}
James M. Reddinger	Distinguished Businessman; Scouting Leader; Selfless Volunteer	^{[i]}
Donald Rumsfeld	National Leader; Naval Aviator; Distinguished Eagle Scout; Philmont Ranger	^{[i]}
R. Ray Wood	Committed Scouter; Business Leader; Youth Advocate	^{[i]}

== 2007 ==
Recipient	Notability	References
Bray Bruce Barnes	Devoted Scouter, Man of God, Distinguished Eagle Scout	
S. Truett Cathy	Business Pioneer, Leading Philanthropist, Man of God	
Dennis H. Chookaszian	Distinguished Eagle Scout, Corporate Leader, Dedicated Volunteer	
Charles W. Dahlquist II	Church Leader, Longtime Scouter, Committed Professional	
L. B. Eckelkamp Jr.	Businessman, Community Leader, Dedicated Scouter	
Archie Manning	World-Class Athlete, Devoted Father, Humanitarian	
Hector A. "Tico" Perez	Dedicated Scouter, Community Leader, Distinguished Attorney	
Mary Anne Rounds	Cub Scout Visionary, Prolific Writer, Dedicated Volunteer	
Joe W. Walkoviak	Scouting Visionary, Corporate Leader, Dedicated Volunteer	
Gary E. Wendlandt	Scouting Leader, Financial executive, Eagle Scout	
Harold A. Yocum	Lifelong Scouter, Eagle Scout, Committed Physician	

== 2008 ==
Recipient	Notability	References
Walter M. "Buster" Brown III	Special-Needs Advocate, Philmont Benefactor, Lifelong Scouter	
Diane M. Cannon	Dedicated Volunteer, Trusted Mentor, Inspirational Trainer	
Peter P. Casey	Corporate Leader, Lifelong Volunteer, Distinguished Eagle Scout	
Harold C. Friend	International Scouter, Dedicated Rotarian, Advocate for Children, Distinguished Eagle Scout	
T. Michael Goodrich	Business Leader, Committed Volunteer, Distinguished Eagle Scout	
John C. "Jack" Jadel	Committed Leader, Education Advocate, Distinguished Eagle Scout	
Neal Roger Johnson	Exploring Advocate, Key Jamboree Leader, Dedicated Public Servant	
G. Edward Lewis	Advocate for Youth, Philanthropist, Community Servant	
Daniel S. Zaccara	Lifelong Scouter, Innovative Trainer, War Veteran	

== 2009 ==
Recipient	Notability	References
R. Thomas Buffenbarger	International President, International Association of Machinists and Aerospace Workers	
D. Kent Clayburn	Dedicated Scouter, Caring Mentor, International Scouting Advocate	
Randall K. Cline	Lifelong Scouter, Visionary Leader, Dedicated Arrowman	
Larry Cunningham	Venturing Pioneer, Dynamic Trainer, Longtime Scouter	
Tommy Dortch	Community Leader, Mentor	
Jeff Gordon	Race-car Driver; Businessman, Community Leader, Friend of Scouting	
Ronald K. Migita	Dedicated Scouter, Education Advocate, Business Leader	
Nathan O. Rosenberg	Visionary Leader, Gifted Trainer, Lifelong Scouter	
James S. Turley	Committed Volunteer, Gifted Leader, Good Scout	
Charles T. Walneck	Innovative Leader, Veteran Scoutmaster, Patriotic American	
Lance B. Wickman	Lifelong Scouter, Combat Veteran, Man of God	

== 2010 ==
Recipient	Notability	References
Keith A. Clark	accomplished leader, distinguished attorney, dedicated Scouter	
Ronald O. Coleman	gifted communicator, friend of youth, creative collaborator	
R. Michael Daniel	Attorney, retired colonel United States Marine Corps Reserve, Eagle Scout	
Jack D. Furst	visionary leader, generous philanthropist, Eagle Scout	
William L. Garrison	Strategic thinker, lifelong volunteer, friend of youth	
William H. Gates III	Business magnate, philanthropist, author, founder and chairman of Microsoft	
Albert S. Lineberry Sr.	lifelong Scouter, tireless volunteer	
Douglas B. Mitchell	master builder, youth advocate	
O. Temple Sloan Jr.	entrepreneur, education advocate	
Charles H. "Chuck" Smith	Businessman, retired president and CEO of AT&T West; Eagle Scout	
Rex Tillerson	Engineer, chairman and CEO of Exxon Mobil; President of the BSA as of May 23, 2010	
Steven E. Weekes	strategic thinker, successful businessman	

== 2011 ==
Recipient	Notability	References
Edward H. Arnold	Business Leader, Generous Philanthropist, Friend of Scouting	
Stephen L Bowen	Jamboree Visionary, Creative Thinker, Gifted Leader	
Gail and Dale Coyne	IndyCar team owners, Friends of Youth, Successful Businesspeople	
William Finerty	Distinguished Physician, International Scouter, Devoted Leader	
Marshall Hollis	Experienced Outdoorsman, Leader in Safety, Trusted Businessman	
Robert Rownd	Skillful Leader, Successful Financial Advisor, Builder of Scouting	
Walter Scott Jr.	Distinguished Eagle Scout, Successful Businessman, Generous Philanthropist	
Robert F. Sinclair	Supporter of Education, Distinguished Eagle Scout, Inventive Leader	
W. Scott Sorrels	Friend of Commissioners, Venturing Pioneer, Youth Advocate	
Mary Stevens	Training Innovator, Technology Trailblazer, Strategic Thinker	

== 2012 ==
Recipient	Notability	References
Allen David Brown	Financial Steward, Tireless Volunteer, Gifted Leader	
Paul R. Christen	Distinguished Eagle Scout, Generous Philanthropist, Servant Leader	
Elaine Smith Francis	Cub Scouting Expert, Friend of Youth, Generous Teacher	
Robert E. Guglielmone	Man of God, Friend of Youth, Innovative Leader	
Stephen B. King Sr.	Lifelong Scouter, Public Servant, Dedicated Leader	
Elmer C. "Neil" Lupton, Ph.D.	Distinguished Eagle Scout, Strategic Thinker, Servant Leader	
Vice Adm. Justin D. McCarthy	Gifted Leader, Dedicated Scouter, Patriot	
Ray Louis Russell	Wood Badge Expert, Distinguished Eagle Scout, Servant Leader	
Russell Hoke Smart	Dedicated Scouter, Visionary Leader, Jamboree Expert	
Randall L. Stephenson	Passionate Leader, Friend of Scouting, Advocate for Youth	
Matthew Maynard Walker	Distinguished Arrowman, Eagle Scout, Cheerful Servant	

== 2013 ==
Recipient	Notability	References
Carlos J. Arboleya	Lifelong Scouter, Tireless Leader, Citizen of the World	
Jeanne D. Arnold	Visionary Philanthropist, Friend of Children, Healthcare Leader	
George N. Boulukos	Gifted Leader, Distinguished Eagle Scout, Man of God	,
Jack S. Butler II	Distinguished Arrowman, Proven Leader, Eagle Scout	
Raymond Capp	Tireless Leader, Cheerful Servant, Distinguished Eagle Scout	
Ralph de la Vega	Gifted Executive, Creative Thinker, Friend of Youth	
J. Russell Hunsaker	Gifted Leader, Visionary Planner, Man of God	
William H. Cardinal Keeler	Distinguished Eagle Scout, Friend of Youth, Man of God	
Steve McGowan	Summit Pioneer, Visionary Leader, Eagle Scout	
Eleanor Smith Morrison	Gifted Trainer, Servant Leader, Distinguished Commissioner	
Barack H. Obama	44th president of the United States	
John F. Pyfer Jr.	Benefactor, International Scouter, Distinguished Eagle Scout	

== 2014 ==
Recipient	Notability	References
David L. Beck	Servant Leader, Man of God, Dynamic Trainer	
Toby Capps	Distinguished Arrowman, Servant Leader, Eagle Scout	
Michael G. Hoffman	Visionary Leader, Distinguished Arrowman, Tireless Volunteer	,
Sen. Joe Manchin	Public Servant, Common Sense Leader, Scouting Advocate	
Robert J. Smith	Gifted Leader, Lifelong Volunteer, Executive Mentor	
William W. Stark Jr.	Visionary Leader, Tireless Volunteer, Distinguished Eagle Scout	
Mark L. Stolowitz	World-Class Trainer, Distinguished Arrowman, Eagle Scout	
R. "Chip" Turner	Man of God, Distinguished Eagle Scout, Bridge Builder	
Rosemary M. Wixom	Gifted Trainer, Advocate of Youth, Woman of God	

== 2015 ==
Recipient	Notability	References
Glenn A. Adams	Visionary Leader, Devoted Scouter, Distinguished Eagle Scout	
Glenn Thomas Ault	Gifted Teacher, Dedicated Physician, Distinguished Arrowman	
Richard Paul Bragga	Servant of Youth, Tireless Volunteer, Distinguished Eagle Scout	
J.S. "Si" Brown III	Outstanding Citizen, Youth Mentor, Distinguished Eagle Scout	
Larry M. Gibson	Religious Leader, Lifelong Scouter, Distinguished Eagle Scout	
Jeffery Q. Jonasen	Distinguished Arrowman, Servant Leader, Eagle Scout	
John Willis Lea IV	Distinguished Commissioner, Renowned Physician, Dedicated Scouter	
Daniel B. Maxfield	Lifelong Scouter, Tireless Volunteer, Servant Leader	
Arthur F. "Skip" Oppenheimer	Community Leader, Education Supporter, Eagle Scout	
Robert J. Sirhal	Dedicated Scouter, Community Servant, Leader of Leaders	
Bruce Robert Trefz	Medical Missionary, Youth Mentor, Dedicated Scouter	
John C. Whitehead	Inspiring Leader, Visionary Statesman, Distinguished Eagle Scout	
Andrew J. Young	Civil Rights Leader, U.S. Ambassador to the United Nations, Human Rights Champion	

== 2016 ==
Recipient	Notability	References
Timothy A. Acree	Training Developer, Servant Leader, Eagle Scout	
L. Ronald Bell	Youth Advocate, Distinguished Eagle Scout, Lifelong Arrowman	
Steven D. Bradley	Servant Leader, Distinguished Arrowman, Eagle Scout	
Daniel Leo Coberly	Visionary Leader, Distinguished Eagle Scout, Scouting Ambassador	
Christopher Allen Grove	Gifted Surgeon, Outstanding Eagle Scout, Friend of Youth	
Timothy Michael Dolan	Spiritual Leader, Friend of Youth, Man of God	
J. Brett Harvey	Business Icon, Model Philanthropist, Scouting Leader	
Mark A. Kriebel	Servant Leader, Friend of Youth, Distinguished Eagle Scout	
Joseph P. Landy	Visionary Leader, Creative Thinker, Dedicated Scouter	
Christine Perry	Committed Volunteer, Teacher of Youth, Woman of God	
James D. Rogers	Committed Volunteer, Friend of Youth, Distinguished Eagle Scout	
John D. Tickle	Business Leader, Philanthropist, Distinguished Eagle Scout	
David M. Weekley	Visionary Leader, Friend of Youth, Distinguished Eagle Scout	

== 2017 ==
Recipient	Notability	References
David Biegler	Friend of Youth	
Nelson Block	Scouting Historian, Advocate of Scouting, Eagle Scout	
L. H. (Larry) Chase	Teacher, Distinguished Commissioner	
Lucia Cronin	Transformative Leader	
Robert G. Dealaman	Longtime Scouter	
Eric L. Hiser	Eagle Scout, Outdoor Advocate	
Kenneth Paul King	Educator, Eagle Scout	
Carol McCarthy	Trainer, Scouting Advocate, Distinguished Commissioner	
Dan Ownby	Scouting Ambassador, Eagle Scout	
Aubrey B. Patterson	Servant to Youth, Education Advocate	
Mark D. Rose	Distinguished Eagle Scout, Youth Mentor	
David Steward	Entrepreneur, Servant Leader	

== 2018 ==
Recipient	Notability	References
Linda Baker, Ph.D.	Teacher, Educational Researcher	
Terry Bramlett	Scouter, Outdoor Enthusiast	
John Norman Brown	Eagle Scout, Educator	
Howard Bulloch	Eagle Scout, Innovative Leader	
Larry W. Coppock	Religious Leader	
Craig E. Fenneman	Eagle Scout, Entrepreneur	
Jack Hess	Eagle Scout, Geologist	
Bill Loeble	Eagle Scout, Longtime Scouter	
María Molinelli	Attorney, Inspirational Leader	
Brian P. Williams	Eagle Scout, Attorney	

== 2019 ==
Recipient	Notability	References
Dave Alexander	Eagle Scout, Benefactor	
Jeffrey S. Bostwick	Judge, Outstanding Eagle Scout	
E. Gordon Gee	College President, Distinguished Eagle Scout	
Dr. Kenneth D. King	Distinguished Eagle Scout, Educator	
Robert E. Murray	Scouter, Benefactor, National Mining Hall of Fame	
William E. “Bill” Rosner	Family Scouting Advocate	
James A. Ryffel	Distinguished Eagle Scout, Entrepreneur	
C. Bari Saunders	International Scouter	
Gary M. Schroeder	Distinguished Eagle Scout, Outdoor Enthusiast	
Alison K. Schuler	Pioneering Leader, Attorney, Rotarian, First woman to led a BSA National Standing Committee	
Daniel Thomas Segersin	Longtime Scouter, Outdoors Enthusiast	
Wesley J. Smith	Champion of Inclusivity	
Kaylene “Kay” Trick	Mentor, Pioneering Leader, First woman to serve on National Order of the Arrow Committee and first female recipient of the OA's Distinguished Service Award	

== 2020 ==
Recipient	Notability	References
Ronald L. Adolphi	Lifelong Volunteer, Distinguished Eagle Scout, Religious Leader, Recipient of the Medal for Distinguished Civilian Service	
Thomas S. Bain	Distinguished Eagle Scout, Distinguished Arrowman, Financial Technologist	
Scott W. Beckett	Eagle Scout, Jamboree Leader, Distinguished Arrowman, Past National Chief of the Order of the Arrow	
Paul C. Bicket, M.D.	Outstanding Eagle Scout, Physician, Jamboree Leader	
Ned Cooper Gold Jr.	Outstanding Eagle Scout, Visionary Scouter, Founder of the Philmont Staff Association, Attorney	
Julia Mae-Shen Lesko	National Wood Badge Coordinator, Long Time Scouter, U.S. Surface Transportation Board	
Charles McGee	Distinguished Eagle Scout, Tuskegee Airman, Brigadier General (retired)	
R. Doyle Parrish	Eagle Scout, Community Leader, Active Scouter	
L. Hugh Redd	Investor, Youth Mentor, National Board Member	
Brian D. Thiessen	Distinguished Eagle Scout, Rotarian, Air Force Veteran, Attorney	
Michael Lawrence Thompson	Distinguished Eagle Scout, Distinguished Arrowman, Public Servant	
Frank D. Tsuru	Distinguished Eagle Scout, Engineer, President of National Eagle Scout Association	
Billy W. Walley	Outstanding Eagle Scout, Distinguished Arrowman, Attorney, Man of God	
Charles D. Wurster	Vice Admiral, USCG (Retired); Distinguished Eagle Scout, Sea Scouting Leader	

== 2021 ==
Recipient	Notability	References
Scott R. Berger	Lifelong Volunteer, Distinguished Eagle Scout, Chair of Scouts BSA Committee, Directors Guild of America Board Member	
Scott R. Christensen	Northeast Region President, National Executive Board Member, Nationally recognized figure in increasing awareness of glaucoma	
Reid A. Christopherson	Eagle Scout, Central Region Commissioner, Jamboree Enthusiast, Air Force Veteran, Evangelical Lutheran Church in America National Executive Committee Member	
Joe R. Crafton Jr.	Summit Supporter, BSA Vice President, Conservation Advocate, Chief Executive Officer	
Gary E. Crum	Western Region President, Jamboree Leader, NFL Athlete	
Thomas C. Edwards	Eagle Scout, BSA Foundation Chair	
Jennifer Hancock	Chair, National BSA Program Development Committee, Child Advocacy, Human Rights and Property Law Attorney	
Charles D. Holmes	Jamboree Advocate, Southern Region Commissioner	
Dabney Kennedy	National Committee Member, Distinguished Order of the Arrow Member	
Jeffrey J. Kosik	Summit advocate, engineer	
Brother Kevin Dismas Moshier FSP	Eagle Scout, Religious leader, Veteran	
Norbert Anthony Steinhardt III	Distinguished Order of the Arrow Member, community leader	
Thomas Richard Yarboro	National Executive Board Member, youth advocate	

== 2022 ==
Recipient	Notability	References
Timothy Beaty	Distinguished Eagle Scout, Conservationist	
Devang Desai	Attorney, Arrowman, Regional Board Member, Eagle Scout	
Jeffrey Goldsmith	Eagle Scout, National Committee Member	
Michael Lanning	Eagle Scout, Trainer	
Richard Mason	Chair on Ad-Hoc Committee, Member of Churchill Task Force, Distinguished Eagle Scout	
Jin Matsumoto	Eagle Scout, Jamboree Scouter, International Scouter	
Paul Moffat	Eagle Scout, Duty to God Advocate	
James Morris	Eagle Scout, Scouting Fundraiser, Executive Director of the United Nations World Food Program	
Stephen Nicolaysen	Distinguished Eagle Scout, BSA Foundation Trustee, Philmont Ranch Properties Committee, Key Leader in the National Camp Accreditation Program	
Rev. Arties Phillips Jr.	African Methodist Episcopal Church Leader	
David Rumbarger Jr.	Distinguished Eagle Scout, National Operations Council Chair	
John Severino	Eagle Scout, Sea Scouting Advocate	
Darlene Sprague	Chair of the National Commissioner Service Team, Devoted Scouter	
William Sugden	Key Member of the Chapter 11 Reorganization Team	
Brigitte Therivel	Bronze Wolf Recipient, Jamboree Scouter, Youth Safety Advocate	
Survivors of Abuse in Scouting		

== 2023 ==
Recipient	Notability	References
Mike Bliss	Eagle Scout, Distinguished Arrowman, Long-Time Scouter	
Salvatore P. Ciampo	Distinguished Eagle Scout, Sea Scout Commodore, National Strategic Analysis and Facilities Management Subcommittee Chair	
J. Robert Coleman	Distinguished Eagle Scout, National Advisory Council Member and BSA National Foundation Member	
Donald J. Dare	Area President, Duty to God Breakfast Chair, National Camp Accreditation Program committee member, Army Veteran, Broadcast Journalist	
Joel A. Eacker	Navy Veteran, Chair of National Volunteer Training Committee, Chair of Scouting University, Philmont Ranch Committee Member, Area President	
Laurence H. Green	Outstanding Eagle Scout, Outdoor Program and Philmont Advocate, Long-Time Scouter	
Janet C. Griffin	Champion for Underserved Youth, Member of many National Committees, Task Forces, and Project Teams, Subject Matter Expert	
Norfleet R. Johnston Sr.	Long-Time Scouter, National Scouting Museum Committee Member	
Andrew Miller	Eagle Scout, National Venturing Leadership Award, Chair of the BSA Alumni Association	
Patrick A. Noack	Eagle Scout, Territory Chair, Chair of the National Program Development Committee	
William M. Perkins	Eagle Scout, Jamboree Leader, Arrowman	
The Hon. Randy L. Potts	NESA Outstanding Eagle Scout, NESA National Committee Member, 2021 National & 2020 Southern Region Alumnus of the Year, National Organization Sea Scout Alumni - National Chairman, Navy Veteran	
Leonard Williams Jr.	Distinguished Eagle Scout, Region Board Member and Territory Chair	
Lisa Wylie	Long-Time Scouter, Council and Area Leader, Chair of National Cub Scouting Committee	

== 2024 ==
Recipient	Notability	References
Laurie Champion	Risk Management Strategist, Council President, Dedicated Scouter	
Mark J. Chilutti	Distinguished Arrowman, Outstanding Eagle Scout, Motivational Speaker	
Kandra Dickerson	First Female Region Commissioner, CPA, Northern Tier Committee Member, National Program Development Committee, National Operations Council Member	
Hon. Frederick "Rick" Hillenbrand, III	Navy Veteran, West Virginia House of Delegates, National Commissioner Service Team Member, Regional Board Member, Council Commissioner	
Jason P. Hood	Outstanding Eagle Scout, Distinguished Arrowman, Attorney, Service Territory Chair, Community Advocate	
David J. Kehrer	Longtime Jamboree Volunteer, Summit Bechtel Reserve Trailblazer	
Dr. James D. Libbin	University Professor, Agriculture Scholar, Regional Commissioner, Commissioner Coordinator, Council President	
Bernard W. Lockard Jr.	Outstanding Eagle Scout, National Venturing Committee Chair, Council President, Area President	
Fred R. Norton Jr.	Eagle Scout, Jamboree Volunteer, Council President	
Louis Paulson	Distinguished Eagle Scout, National Executive Board Member, Professional Firefighter, Public Servant	
Michael R. Rooney	Distinguished Eagle Scout, Attorney, National Cub Scouting Committee Commissioner	
Sven J. Rundman III	Industrial Hygienist, National Committee Member, Wood Badge and Jamboree Leader	
Dr. Arnold F. Traupman	Distinguished Eagle Scout, Ophthalmologist, Council President and Commissioner	
Michael F. Weber	Distinguished Eagle Scout, Automotive Engineer, National Commissioner Service Team Member	

== 2025 ==
Recipient	Notability	References
David Thomas Berry	Outstanding Eagle Scout, Safe Scouting Advocate, Retired Health Care Executive	
Hon. Gerard J. Boyle	Retired Marine Colonel, Longtime Volunteer, National Youth Leadership Training Course Director	
Edward A. “Andy” Chapman	Eagle Scout, World Scout Committee Chair, International Scouting Advocate	
Gary Christiansen	Outstanding Eagle Scout, Longtime Supporter of the Order of the Arrow, Jamboree Volunteer	
Donna Jean (Holland) Copeland	National Duty to God Award Recipient, Adult and Youth Leadership Training Advocate, Tireless Volunteer	
Julie A. Dalton	National Venturing Leader, Council President, Jamboree Advocate, Award-Winning Volunteer	
David Michael Ehrlich	Outstanding Eagle Scout, National Youth Leader Training Task Force Leader, National Advanced Youth Leadership Experience Development Leader	
William Goebel	Eagle Scout, Council President, Eagle Scout Mentor	
Linda Goff	Council Training Chair, Philmont Training Center Faculty Member, Longtime Volunteer	
James K. Hendren	Distinguished Eagle Scout, Council President, Community Advocate	
Timothy I. Malaney	Outstanding Eagle Scout, National Jamboree Leader, Sea Scout Leader	
Brad Tilden	Distinguished Eagle Scout, Alaska Airlines CEO, Council President, Scouting America National Chair, Outdoor Enthusiast	
William Henry “Bill” Topkis	Eagle Scout, Scouting Historian, Distinguished Arrowman, Dedicated National Leader	
Dan Walters	Outstanding Eagle Scout, National Scouting Leader, Award-Winning Volunteer	

== 2026 ==
Recipient	Notability	References
John Beebe, Sr.	Outstanding Eagle Scout, Longtime National Eagle Scout Association Advocate, Community Volunteer	
David W. Bell	Aquatics Safety Expert, Longtime Camp Staffer, Retired Geophysicist	
Timothy Brown	Outstanding Eagle Scout, Alumni Ambassador, Longtime Supporter of the Order of the Arrow	
John Dozier	International Scouting Advovate, World Jamboree Volunteer, Dedicated Volunteer	
Dr. Jay William Fox	Outstanding Eagle Scout, Aquatics Expert, Devoted Cubmaster and Scoutmaster	
David Alan Gingras	Eagle Scout, Council President, Dedicated Leader	
Jane Grossman	Special Needs Scouting Advocate, Community Leader, Longtime Volunteer	
Richard K. Hathaway	International Scouting Advocate, Council Board Member, Mentor to Youth	
James Terry Honan	Distinguished Eagle Scout, Council Board Member, Longtime Volunteer	
Dennis Kampa	Outstanding Eagle Scout, National Cub Scout Committee Member, Cub Scout Camping Expert	
Michael R. Philbrook	Outstanding Eagle Scout, Jamboree Leader, Sea Scout Leader	
Rev. David Weyrick	Eagle Scout, Relationships Builder, Faith Leader	
Barry Williams	Outstanding Eagle Scout, Region President, Dedicated Youth Mentor	
Patricia Jeanne Wrath	Wood Badge Course Director, Jamboree Staffer, Trainer, Dedicated Cub Scouting Volunteer	

== Notes ==
"List of Silver Buffalo Recipients". Boy Scouts of America.
