= Hamner =

Hamner is a surname. Notable people with the surname include:

- Cully Hamner (born 1969), American comic book artist
- Earl Hamner, Jr. (1923–2016), American television writer and producer
- Garvin Hamner (1924–2003), American baseball player
- Granny Hamner (1927–1993), American baseball player
- Henry K. Hamner (1922–1945), United States Navy officer
- M. Gail Hamner (born 1963), American scholar, author, and professor of religion
- Millie Hamner, American educator and politician
- Nora Spencer Hanmer (1945–2001), American baseball player
- Scott Hamner (born 1956), American television writer

== See also ==
- Nicholas Hamner Cobbs (1796–1861), Bishop of the Episcopal Church in the United States of America
- USS Hamner (DD-718), a Gearing-class destroyer
- Hanmer (disambiguation)
