= William Fetridge =

William Fetridge may refer to:

- William Harrison Fetridge, vice president of the Boy Scouts of America
- William Pembroke Fetridge, travel writer, publisher, bookseller and periodicals distributor
