= The American Boy =

American monthly magazine (1899–1941)

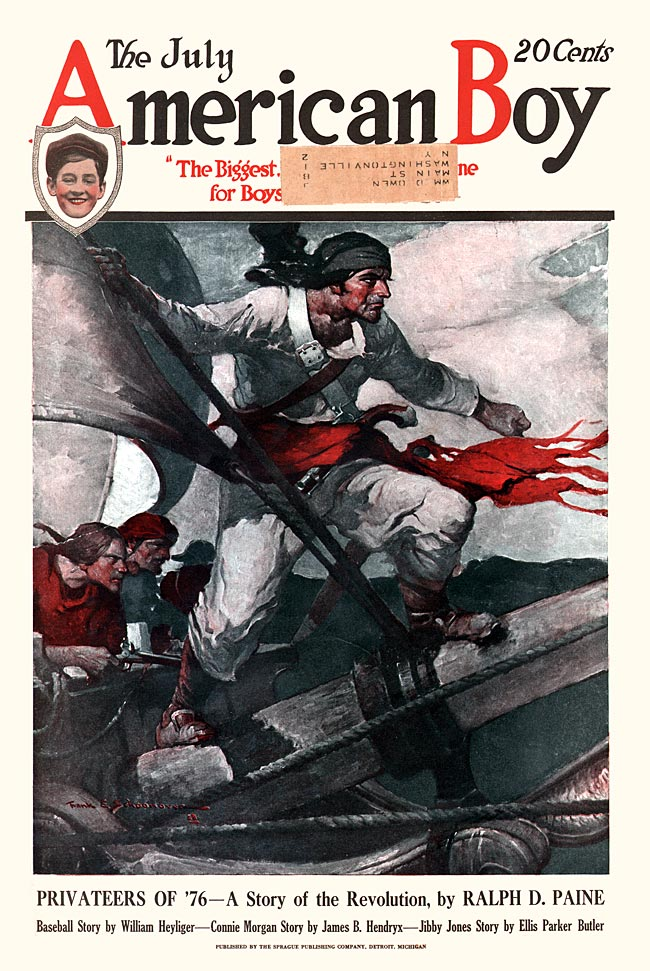
- July 1923 Issue
- Categories: Boys' magazine
- Frequency: Monthly
- First issue: November 1899
- Final issue: August 1941
- Company: Sprague Publishing Co.
- Country: United States
- Based in: Detroit, Michigan
- Language: English

The American Boy was a monthly magazine published by The Sprague Publishing Co. of Detroit, Michigan, from November 1899 to August 1941. At the time it was the largest magazine for boys, with a circulation of 300,000, and it featured action stories and advertising for the young boy.

In 1911 a copy cost $0.10, and a year's subscription was $1.00. Format was 16" high by 12" wide. Founded by William C. Sprague of the Detroit-based Sprague Publishing Company in 1900, Griffith Ogden Ellis took over as president and editor in 1908. J. Cotner Jr. was secretary and treasurer; H. D. Montgomerie was managing editor and Clarence Budington Kelland was assistant editor. In 1929, Ellis merged the magazine with its rival, The Youth's Companion, and in 1939 he sold his interest to his business manager, Elmer Presley Grierson. Franklin M. Reck was managing editor from 1936 to 1941. George F. Pierrot (1898–1980), former managing editor and well-known traveler, became half-owner and co-publisher on November 1, 1940.

== See also ==
- "The Story of the American Boy", The Writer, June 1930
