= Franklin M. Reck =

American journalist

Franklin M. (Franklin Mering) Reck
- Born: 1896; Chicago, Illinois
- Died: 1965 (aged 68–69); Manchester, Michigan

Franklin M. Reck (November 29, 1896 – October 15, 1965) was an American writer best known for his books for boys. He also wrote books and magazine articles about American transportation.

== Biography ==
Franklin Mering Reck was born in Chicago, Illinois. His first book, Sergeant Pinky, was published shortly after World War I and related Mering's experiences of the war. He served in the American army as part of the 110th infantry. In 1925, he graduated from Iowa State University with a degree in Agricultural Journalism.

He wrote widely on transportation, including the book The Romance of American Transportation (1939, republished 1962). Among his other works are an official history of the 4-H movement, The 4-H Story and the Ford Guide to Outdoor Living and Station Wagon Living. He also served for six years as boys editor of the Farm Journal and for ten years as an editor of The American Boy. Mering's final book, Stories Boys Like, was released the day he died.

== Selected works ==
- The Romance of American Transportation (1962)
- Tomorrow We Fly (1943)
- The Ford Guide to Outdoor Living on Wheels (1952)
- The Dilworth Story (1954)
- The 4-H Story: A History of 4-H Club Work (1951)
- Sergeant Pinky
- Sand in Their Shoes; The Story of American Steel Foundries (1952)
- Radio From Start to Finish (1942)
- Power From Sstart to Finish (1941)
- On Time: The History of Electro-Motive Division of General Motors Corporation (1948)
- Automobiles From Start to Finish (1935)
