= Hanmer =

Hanmer can refer to:

== People ==
- David Hanmer, 14th century English judge
- Lee F. Hanmer (1871–1961), American social worker
- Margaret Hanmer, Owain Glyndwr's wife
- Paul Hanmer, South African composer and pianist
- Ronald Hanmer, composer
- Sir Thomas Hanmer, 2nd Baronet (1612–78), second baronet of Hanmer, Flintshire
- Sir Thomas Hanmer, 2nd Baronet (1747–1828) of the second creation
- Sir Thomas Hanmer, 4th Baronet, fourth baronet of Hanmer, Flintshire and Speaker of the House of Commons

== Titles ==
- Hanmer baronets

== Places ==
- Hanmer, Ontario, Canada
- Hanmer, Wrexham, Wales
  - Hanmer Mere
- Hanmer River, near Hanmer Springs, New Zealand
- Hanmer Springs in New Zealand

- Hanmer Springs Ski Area
