= Griffith Ogden Ellis =

Griffith Ogden Ellis (November 19, 1869 in Urbana, Ohio–1948) was an American businessman, who served as president of Sprague Publishing Company, publisher of popular magazine The American Boy and other national periodicals, from 1908 to 1939.

== Career ==
Ellis was the second publisher and president after founder William Cyrus Sprague (1850–1922), his brother-in-law. Ellis' wife Ellen Winifred Scripps (1873–1965) – a daughter of William Armiger Scripps (1838–1914) and Ambrosia Clarinda Antisdel (1947–1894) – was a niece of publisher E. W. Scripps.

Ellis was a co-founder of the Boy Scouts of America. He also served as president of Detroit-based real-estate holding company William A. Scripps Co.

Ellis was also a freemason and his interest in it, along with that of fellow early Scouters Daniel Carter Beard, William D. Boyce, and Ernest Thompson Seton, probably contributed to the similar formulas and structure of Scouting and its later honor fraternity, the Order of the Arrow.
