= Robert W. Briggs =

Robert W. Briggs may represent:

- Robert Briggs (scientist) (1911—1983), American scientist
- Robert W. Briggs (Illinois politician), 19th century Illinois state representative
