= M. Gail Hamner =

American scholar

- Born: 1963 (age 62–63)
- Education: Duke University, Biology (B.S.) Boston University, Philosophical Theology (M.T.S.) Duke University, Religion (Ph.D.)
- Occupations: American Scholar, Author and Professor
- Years active: 1997 - Present
- Notable work: American Pragmatism: A Religious Genealogy
- Website: https://affecognitive.wordpress.com

M. Gail Hamner (born 1963) is an American scholar, author, and a professor at Syracuse University. Hamner is a professor of religion, while also an affiliate in the Faculty of Women and Gender Studies and Film and Screen Studies. She is the author of American Pragmatism: A Religious Genealogy.

== Education ==
Hamner attended Duke University, where in 1985 she received her undergraduate Bachelor of Science in biology. She then went on to complete her Masters of Philosophical Theology at Boston University School of Theology in 1989 and her Ph.D. in religion in 1997 at Duke University.

== Career ==
Hamner worked as a lecturer for the Department of Religion at Duke University from 1997–1998 before becoming an assistant professor for the Department of Religion at Syracuse University until 2005. Hamner became an associate professor of religion in 2005 before becoming a full professor at Syracuse University in 2013. In 2008, she became affiliated with the faculty of Women and Gender Studies at Syracuse University. As of 2015, she is affiliated with the faculty of Film and Screen Studies.

Since 2014 Hamner has been the co-chair of the American Academy of Religion (AAR) in the field of "Religion and Media Workshop" She is a member of The International Merleau-Ponty Circle, which focuses on the theory of philosophy.

== Books and publications ==
Hamner published her first book, American Pragmatism: A Religious Genealogy, in 2003 arguing about the uniqueness of pragmatism in America in relation to theology. The book garnered reviews in academic journals including The Journal of Religion, Transactions of the Charles S. Peirce Society, Journal of the American Academy of Religion, and Choice.

In 2012, Hamner published her second book, Imaging Religion in Film: The Politics of Nostalgia, where she examines the ethico-political dimensions of religion and film which was reviewed in the journal Anglican and Episcopal History. and is currently in the process of writing her third book, Public Affect: The Affective Dynamics of Religion in our Global 'public sphere' as felt through the Sci-Fi Feminine. Her most noted publication is Akira Kurosawa: "What is a Thing?"; Posing the Religious in Dress Uzala.

== Controversy ==
In 2016, Hamner faced backlash for not playing an Israeli film in front of her students and colleagues at a conference for "The Place of Religion in Film." Due to ongoing issues in the Middle East and BDS movements in Syracuse, Hamner emailed filmmaker Shimon Dotan about her reluctance to show his documentary, "The Settlers", due to certain groups boycotting Israel at Syracuse University. She issued a public apology through the Syracuse University following the controversy.
