= Ann W. Nally =

- Occupation: Writer

Ann W. Nally was a noted leader and author in the Boy Scouts of America from the state of Virginia.

== Background ==
She was born Martha Ann Wilson in Nashville, Tennessee to Edith Elizabeth Goodman and Lloyd Wilson. She graduated West End High School in Nashville, Tennessee in 1944. After marriage to James D. Nally, a career U. S. Air Force officer, in 1947, she became involved in Scouting both in the United States and abroad. They had five sons and one daughter.

She was recognized as one of the first three Silver Fawn recipients by Boy Scouts of America along with Elizabeth Augustus Knight (wife of John S. Knight) and Marjorie Merriweather Post. Nally served on the National Cub Scout Committee of the Boy Scouts of America from 1974-1986.

In 1975 the first Silver Antelope Award presented to women were awarded to LaVern W. Parmley and Ann W. Nally.

In 1982 Ann awarded the Silver Buffalo by the Boy Scouts of America along with Ronald Reagan and Art Linkletter.

In 1984 she became the first woman to serve on the Boy Scouts of America National Court of Honor. Nally was the principal author of the "History of Cub Scouting", published by the Boy Scouts of America, Irving, Texas, 1987.

Ann W. Nally died in Ashburn, Virginia. Her papers, correspondence and memorabilia have been given to the New Jersey Scout Museum in Morganville, New Jersey for research and public display.
