= USS Hamner =

Gearing-class destroyer

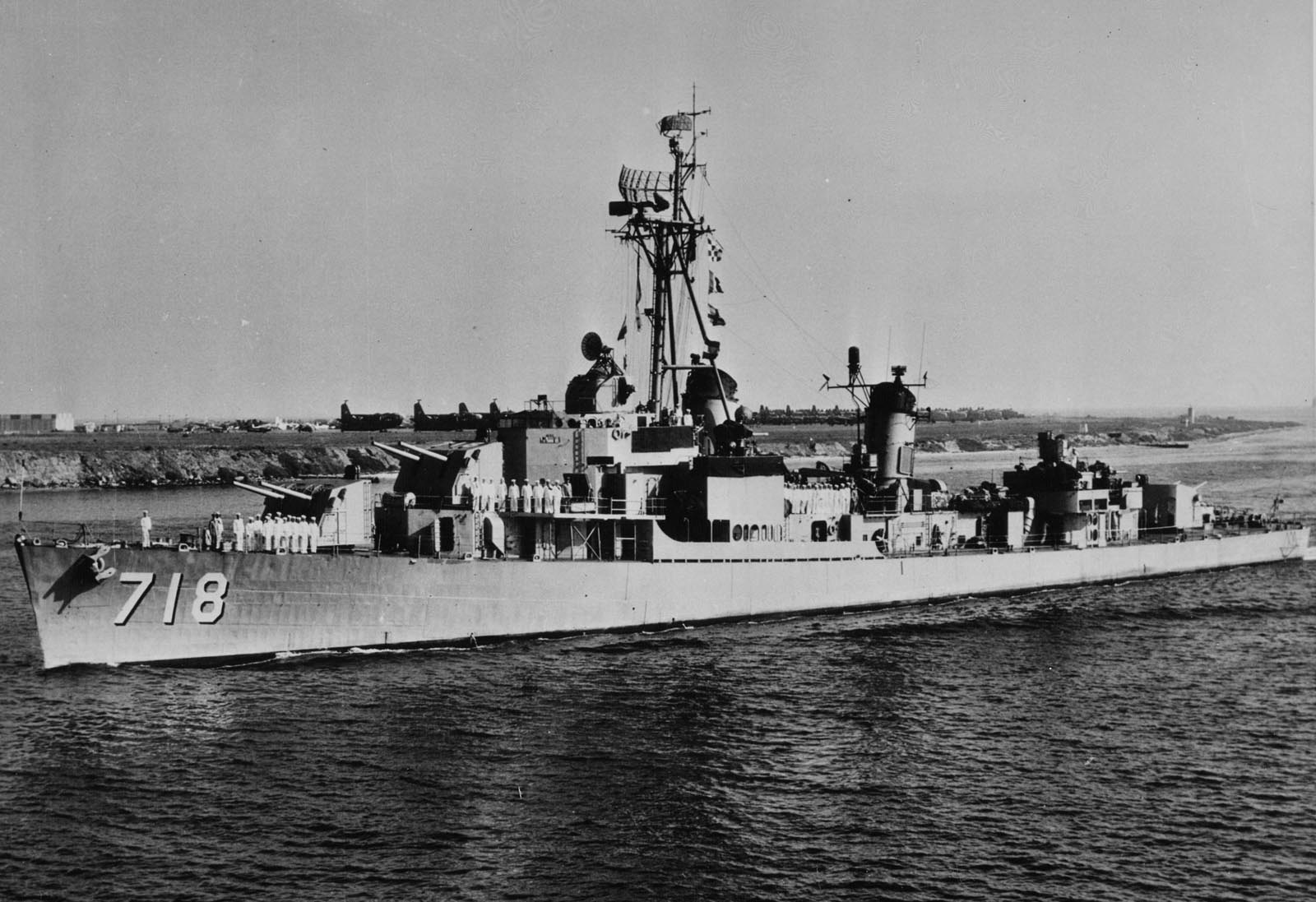
- USS Hamner off North Island in the 1950s

History

United States
- Name: Hamner
- Namesake: Henry Rawlings Hamner
- Builder: Federal Shipbuilding and Drydock Company
- Laid down: 25 April 1945
- Launched: 24 November 1945
- Sponsored by: Mrs. Henry Rawlings Hamner
- Commissioned: 12 July 1946
- Modernized: 5 December 1962 (FRAM IB)
- Stricken: 1 October 1979
- Identification: Callsign: NTXJ; Hull number: DD-718
- Motto: On The Way
- Honors and awards: See Awards
- Fate: Sold to Taiwan, 17 December 1980
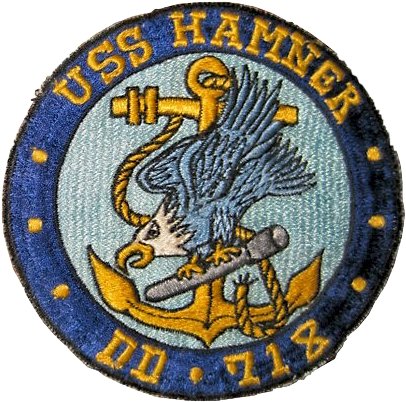
- Badge

History

Taiwan
- Name: Yun Yang; (雲陽)
- Namesake: Yun Yang
- Acquired: 17 December 1980
- Commissioned: 15 May 1981
- Reclassified: DDG-927
- Identification: Hull number: DD-927
- Decommissioned: 16 December 2003
- Fate: Sunk as target, 6 September 2005

General characteristics
- Class & type: Gearing-class destroyer
- Displacement: 2,425 long tons (2,464 t) (standard); 3,460 long tons (3,520 t) (full)
- Length: 390 ft 6 in (119.0 m) (overall)
- Beam: 40 ft 10 in (12.45 m)
- Draft: 14 ft 4 in (4.37 m)
- Propulsion: 2 × geared turbines; 2 × propellers
- Speed: 35 kn (65 km/h; 40 mph)
- Range: 4,500 nmi (8,300 km; 5,200 mi) at 20 kn (37 km/h; 23 mph)
- Complement: 336 officers and enlisted
- Armament: 6 × 5 in (127 mm)/38 caliber guns; 12 × 40 mm (1.6 in) Bofors AA guns; 11 × 20 mm (0.79 in) Oerlikon AA cannons; 10 × 21 in (533 mm) torpedo tubes; 6 × depth charge projectors; 2 × depth charge tracks

USS Hamner (DD-718) was a Gearing-class destroyer in the United States Navy during the Korean War and the Vietnam War. She was named for Henry R. Hamner.

== Namesake ==
Henry Rawlings Hamner was born on 13 March 1922 in London, England. Appointed to the United States Naval Academy from Virginia, he graduated and gained his commission in June 1942. Hamner served to fit out and commission several new ships during the war, in addition to serving in the 12th Naval District and at Norfolk, Va. He was appointed lieutenant in July 1944. Lieutenant Hamner died on 6 April 1945 aboard USS Howorth (DD-592), when the ship was hit by a kamikaze.

== Construction and career ==
Hamner was launched on 24 November 1945 by the Federal Shipbuilding and Drydock Company, Port Newark, New Jersey; sponsored by Mrs. Henry Rawlings Hamner, wife of Lt. Hamner; and commissioned on 12 July 1946.

=== Service in the United States Navy ===
After shakedown in the Caribbean Sea, Hamner reported to the Pacific Fleet on 24 December 1946 and immediately departed for her first deployment with the 7th Fleet. The destroyer spent nine months operating with Destroyer Division 111 out of various Chinese and Japanese ports before returning to the States for six months of training operations. Hamner followed this pattern of cruises until hostilities began in Korea on 24 June 1950.

==== Korean War ====
Deployed in the Far East at the time, Hamner sailed to the Korean coast and began shore bombardment of Communist positions and supply lines. After participating in the evacuation of Yongdok and the defense of Pohang Dong, Hamner joined Task Force 77 for the amphibious operations against Inchon on 15 September 1950.

After operating along the Korean coast to screen aircraft carriers whose planes were pounding Communist troops, Hamner returned to the States in March 1951. She was back on line in October 1951 and continued to patrol waters surrounding the peninsula with various task forces and bombardment groups, effectively damaging and checking the enemy. In March 1952, she spent five weeks on shore bombardment off the east coast of Korea near Kojo causing much damage to the enemy. Returning to the States in May 1952, Hamner resumed her duties along the Korean coast on 2 January 1953, remaining there on the bombline, at the siege of Wonsan Harbor, and on Formosa patrol until the s:Korean Armistice Agreement of 27 July 1953.

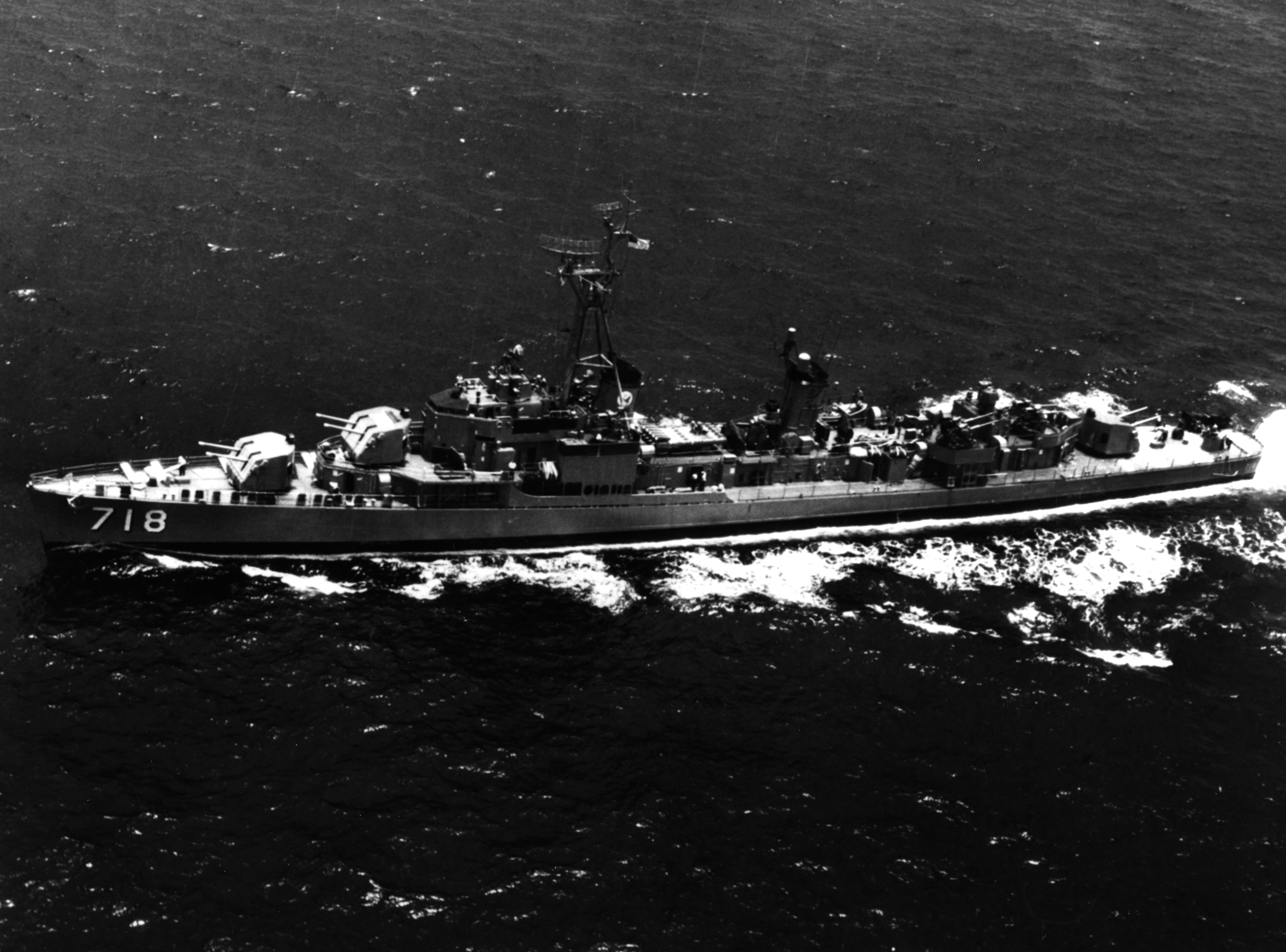
Hamner underway in 1960

Hamner returned to the Western Pacific every year thereafter visiting ports in Korea, Japan, Taiwan, the Philippines, and Australia (arrival 2 August 1956 in Brisbane and arrival 6 Oct 1957 in Melbourne), and 1959. The destroyer made many good-will visits to Asian ports and engaged in exercises and Formosa patrol. She arrived off Taiwan for six weeks duty with the Taiwan Patrol Force on 31 December 1958, just after another flareup of the Quemoy-Matsu crisis. When not deployed in the Pacific, Hamner trained out of San Diego, California.

Entering the San Francisco Ship Yard in January 1962, she underwent a Fleet Rehabilitation and Modernization (FRAM) overhaul designed to add 10 to 20 years to her operating efficiency. Fitted with a new superstructure and the Navy's most modern electronic equipment, Hamner left the shipyard on 5 December 1962 and, after training, sailed for her 13th WestPac cruise on 18 May 1963. During this cruise she was part of the ready amphibious group in South Vietnam coastal waters in September.

==== Vietnam War ====
Hamner returned to San Diego on 24 November. She operated along the West Coast throughout 1964 and sailed again for the Orient on 5 January 1965. Arriving Subic Bay on the 27th, she escorted aircraft carrier Hancock (CVA-19) to the Gulf of Tonkin. On 15 March she joined aircraft carrier Coral Sea (CVA-43) in "Yankee Team" operations. On 10 May she sailed North to cover Seabee landings at Chu Lai. "Operation Market Time" began five days later and on the 20th Hamner shelled Communist positions in South Vietnam in the first scheduled shore bombardment by the U.S. Nayy since the Korean War. Thereafter she screened Coral Sea, bombarded the Trung Phan area on 25 June, and covered the landing of Marines from Iwo Jima (LPH-2) at Qui Nhon on 1 July. Two weeks later the destroyer sailed home, reaching San Francisco on the 26th.

Overhaul at Hunter's Point and operations off the West Coast occupied the next year. Hamner got underway for her 14th WestPac deployment on 2 July 1966. Late in the month she bombarded South Vietnam. Following patrol duty, she steamed up the Lòng Tàu River to shell the Rung Sat Special Zone.

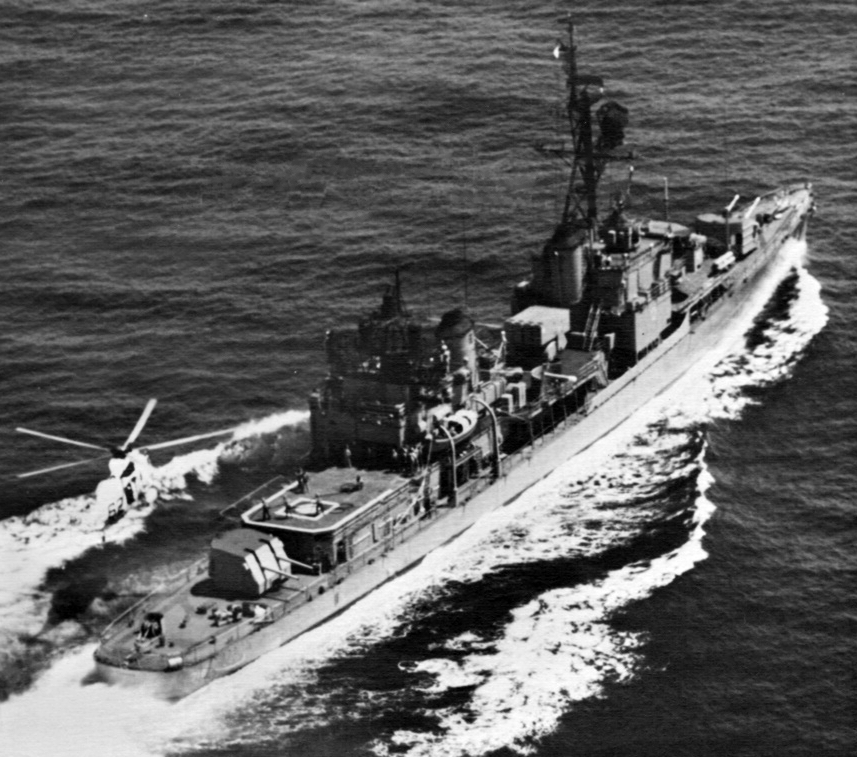
A SH-3 Sea King helicopter hovering above Hamner in 1979

Hamner joined TG 77.6 as plane guard for Oriskany (CVA-34) on 1 October and continued this duty until receiving an emergency call from the carrier at 0730 on the 26th "I am on fire." Maneuvering alongside, Hamner sprayed cooling water on the charred and buckled bulkheads until this threat had gone then escorted her to Subic Bay for repairs.

Returning to the gunline off Vietnam on 6 November, the destroyer spent two weeks in Operation Traffic Cop, shelling the junks that were bringing arms and supplies to the Viet Cong. Within a fortnight, Hamner had destroyed 67 craft. On 14 November and 19 November shore batteries fired on Hamner, and John R. Craig (DD-885). Although several rounds sprayed the destroyers with shrapnel, neither ship was damaged. On each occasion the American ships moved outside range of the enemy guns and bombarded the shore batteries. Leaving the gunline on 20 November, a month and a day later, Hamner reached San Diego.

After spending several years on Swan Island in Portland, Oregon as a vessel used for Naval and Marine reserve training, she was decommissioned in the 1970s and stricken from the Naval Vessel Register on 1 October 1979. She was sold to Taiwan on 17 December 1980.

In 1983, the ships bell was dedicated to Naval Hospital Camp Pendleton in San Diego and is displayed at their main entrance.

=== Service in the Republic of China Navy ===
The ship was renamed ROCS Yun Yang (DD-927). She was reclassified as a guided-missile destroyer (DDG-927).

Yun Yang was decommissioned on 16 December 2003.

She was sunk by Hai Hu (SS-794) as a target off Kaohsiung on 6 September 2005.

== Awards ==
Hamner was awarded five battle stars as well as a Presidential Unit Citation for her outstanding service in Korea.

As of 2018, no other ship in the United States Navy has been named Hamner.
