= William Harrison Fetridge =

American scout leader (1906–1989)

Personal details
- Born: 1906 Chicago, Illinois
- Died: July 13, 1989 (aged 82) Chicago, Illinois
- Awards: Bronze Wolf; Silver Buffalo; Silver Antelope; Distinguished Eagle Scout

Military service
- Allegiance: United States
- Branch/service: Navy
- Rank: Lieutenant commander
- Battles/wars: World War II

William Harrison Fetridge (1906 – July 13, 1989) served as vice president of the Boy Scouts of America, president of the United States Support Fund for International Scouting, and chair of the Finance Planning Committee of the World Organization of the Scout Movement.

== Background ==
Fetridge was born in Chicago, Illinois. He was a lieutenant commander during World War II, a maritime writer (author of "The Navy Reader" and "The Second Navy Reader"), Vice-President of Popular Mechanics magazine, and President of the Dartnell Corporation. He also served as president of the United Republican Fund of Illinois from 1968–1973, and again from 1979–1980.

In 1973, Fetridge was awarded the 77th Bronze Wolf, the only distinction of the World Organization of the Scout Movement, awarded by the World Scout Committee for exceptional services to World Scouting. He was one of only six men to hold all four top-tier Scouting awards, the Bronze Wolf, the Silver Buffalo the Silver Antelope, and the Distinguished Eagle Scout Award.

Fetridge died in Chicago on July 13, 1989.
