= Lee F. Hanmer =

Lee Franklin Hanmer
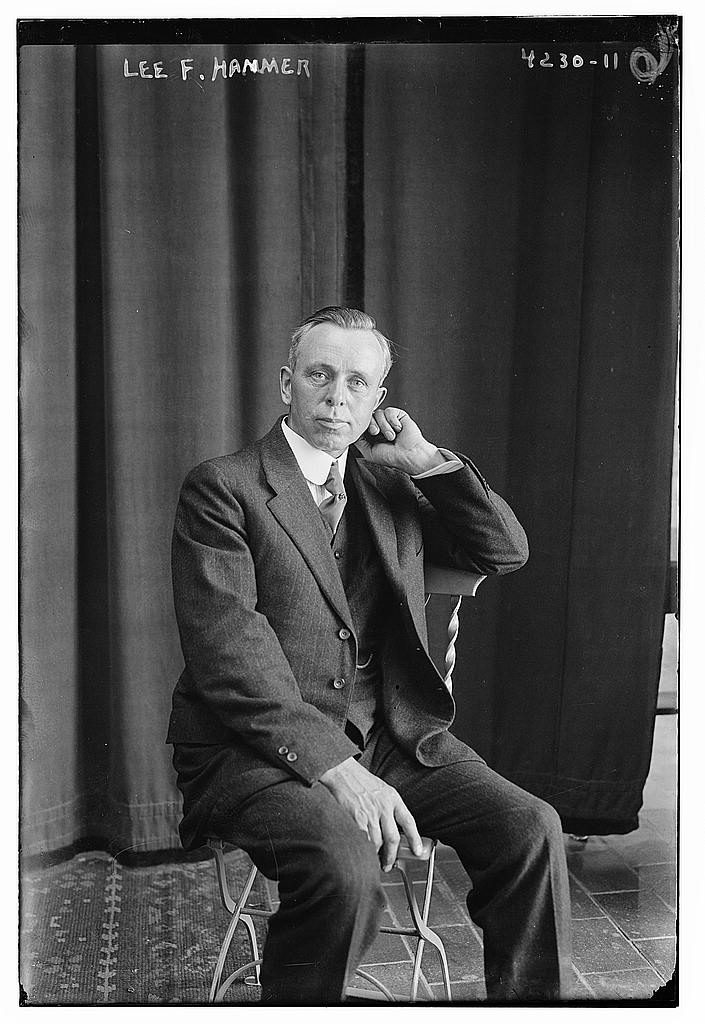
- Hanmer in 1917
- Born: October 24, 1871
- Died: April 27, 1961 (aged 89)

Lee Franklin Hanmer (October 24, 1871 – April 27, 1961) was the director of the recreation department of the Russell Sage Foundation from 1912 to 1937. In that capacity, he helped to found the Boy Scouts of America. He later helped to form the Campfire Girls of America in 1912.

== Biography ==
He was born on October 24, 1871, in Schuyler County, New York. Hanmer attended Cornell University and New York University. He worked in the New York City school system, serving as a physical training supervisor from 1903 to 1906 and then as athletics inspector through 1907. He then worked as a secretary of the Playground Association of America before moving to the Russell Sage Foundation.

He married Mary Belle Garlick on June 27, 1900, in Sidney, New York.

In 1910, Hanmer was selected as a member of the American Committee for the 1912 Summer Olympics.

Hanmer directed recreation for servicemen during World War I. He was later a chairman of the Motion Pictures Producers and Distributors Association.

The BSA presented Hanmer with the ninth Silver Buffalo Award in 1926.

He died on April 27, 1961, in New Paltz, New York.

== Works ==
- First Steps in Organizing Playgrounds. Russell Sage Foundation. 1908.
- Building boyhood: A book of principles. Sunday School Times. 1909.
