= Britsch =

Britsch is a surname. Notable people with the surname include:

- Dominik Britsch (born 1987), German professional boxer
- Gustaf Britsch (1879–1923), German art theorist
- R. Lanier Britsch (born 1938), American historian
- Todd Britsch (born 1937), American Mormon missionary and Humanities professor
