= Ore-Ida =

American frozen food brand

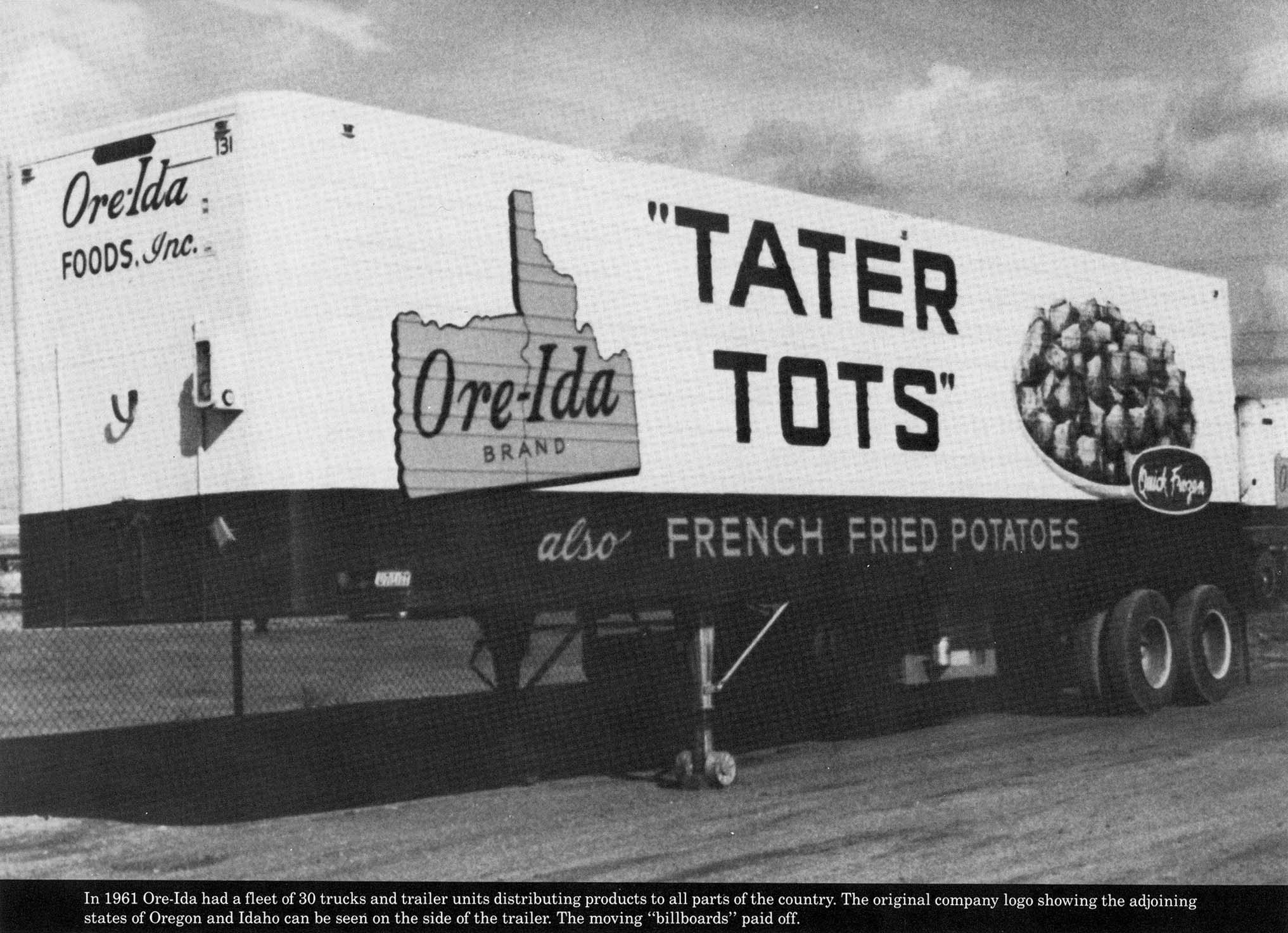
- A trailer advertising the Ore-Ida brand, showing the outlines of Oregon and Idaho, circa 1961
- Type: Subsidiary
- Industry: Retail, food
- Founded: 1952; 74 years ago
- Founders: Ross Erin Butler Sr. Francis Nephi Grigg; Golden Grigg
- Headquarters: Pittsburgh, Pennsylvania, U.S.
- Parent: Kraft Heinz
- Website: Ore-Ida

Ore-Ida (/ɔːrˈaɪdə/; orr-EYE-də) is a brand of potato-based frozen foods owned by Kraft Heinz's H.J. Heinz Company Brands LLC, which is based in Pittsburgh, Pennsylvania.

Ore-Ida's primary production facility is located in Ontario, Oregon, near the Idaho border where the company was originally founded in 1949.

== History ==
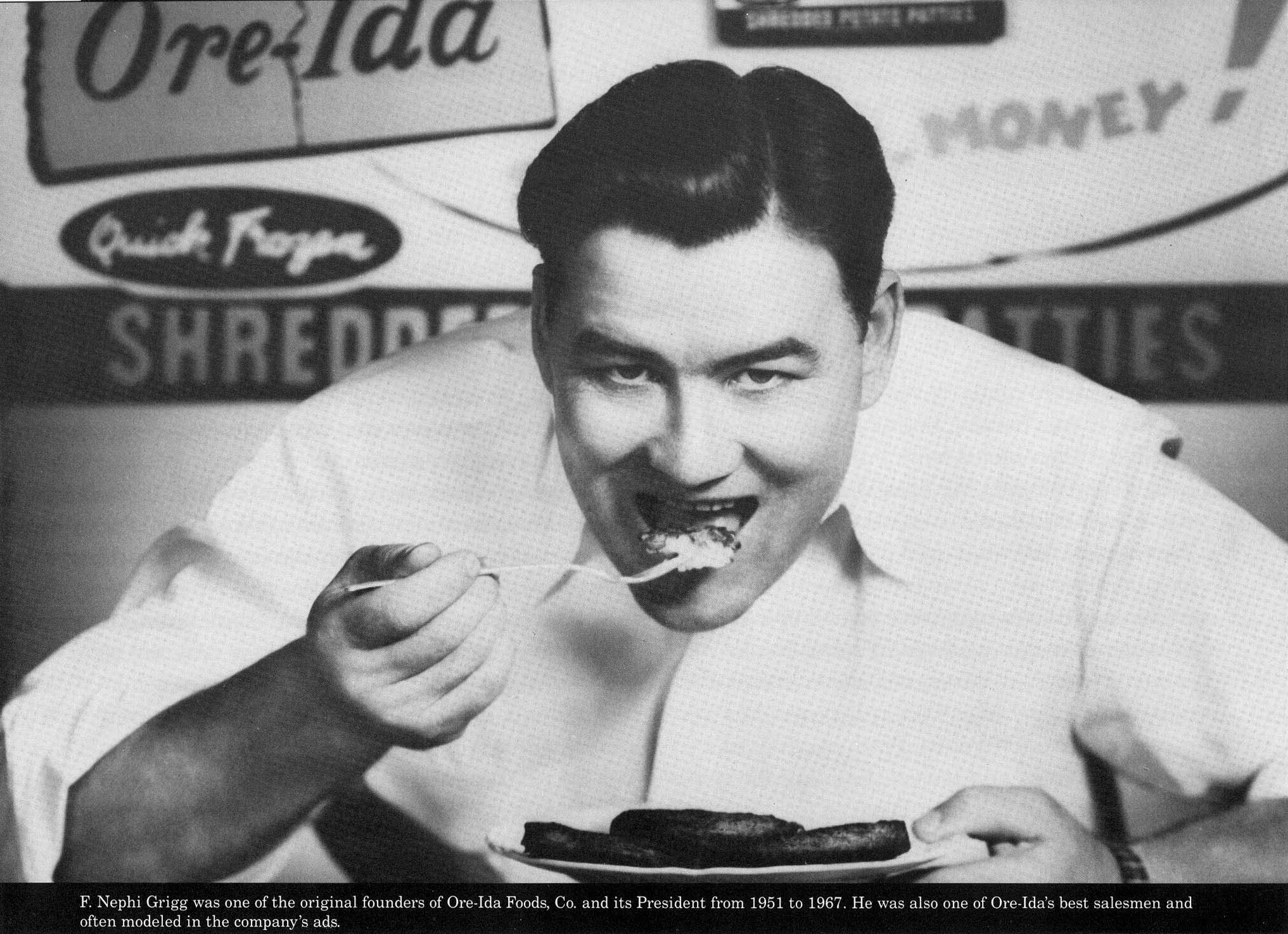
Francis Nephi Grigg, one of the Grigg brothers who founded the "Oregon Frozen Foods Company" that evolved into Ore-Ida

In 1934, entrepreneurs Francis Nephi Grigg and Golden Grigg began growing sweet corn in eastern Oregon. Their first company, "Grigg Brothers", became the largest distributor of sweet corn in the United States. In 1949, with financial backing from their brother-in-law Otis Williams, the brothers rented a frozen food plant located in Ontario and converted it into a potato-processing facility. The three purchased the facility around 1952 after the plant went into foreclosure. The company was officially founded that year as the "Oregon Frozen Foods Company".

The company initially produced and sold frozen corn and French fries. In 1953, Nephi, Golden, Otis, and Ross developed Tater Tots, bite-sized "logs" formed from seasoned slivers of potatoes, which were leftovers from French fry production. The name “tater tots” can be attributed to Clora Lay Orton after the brothers created a contest with their friends and employees to create a name for the potato “logs". Tater Tots are today considered the brand's most well known product.

In 1960, the company built a second plant in Burley, Idaho. The company's name is a syllabic abbreviation of the first few letters of Oregon and Idaho and the original logo consisted of the outlines of Oregon and Idaho with Ore-Ida superimposed in italicized letters.

After going public in 1961, the Ore-Ida brand was acquired by the H. J. Heinz Company in 1965. The Heinz company coined Ore-Ida's long-time advertising slogan: “When it says Ore-Ida, it’s All Righta.”

McCain Foods purchased Ore-Ida's foodservice division in 1997, acquiring five of the company's plants, including the Burley location. Ore-Ida's division headquarters were located in Boise until 1999, when a new frozen foods division was created based at Heinz's corporate headquarters in Pittsburgh, Pennsylvania.

In 2022, Boise-based J.R. Simplot Company acquired the Ontario facility; Kraft Heinz retains ownership of the Ore-Ida brand, which is now produced by Simplot under a long-term agreement.

== Sub-brands ==
=== Bagel Bites ===
Bagel Bites are a brand of frozen pizza bagel snacks formerly marketed by Ore-Ida. The product was invented by Bob Mosher and Stanley Garczynski, both of Fort Myers, Florida, who then sold the company to major food producer John Labatt Co. Later a large portion of Labatt Co. was purchased by Heinz in 1991 in a $500-million deal. Manufacturing of Bagel Bites was subsequently handled by Ore-Ida's plant in Fort Myers. The product is currently marketed by Ore-Ida's parent company Kraft Heinz.

=== Just Crack an Egg ===
Just Crack an Egg is a brand of scrambled egg preparation kits formerly marketed by Ore-Ida. The flagship product contains Ore-Ida cubed potatoes, Oscar Mayer breakfast meat, and Kraft cheddar cheese in a bowl, onto which one cracks an egg, stirs, and prepares it in the microwave to create a scrambled egg meal. It was introduced in February 2018 by Kraft Heinz under the Ore-Ida line and made $50.7 million on sales of 21.7 million cups in its first year on the market. The product is currently marketed by Ore-Ida's parent company Kraft Heinz.

== Sports sponsorship ==
- Ore-Ida Women's Challenge road cycling race in the 1980s and 1990s.
- In 2005 and 2006, Ore-Ida sponsored Brian Vickers' #57 Chevrolet in the NASCAR Busch Series. In 2007, Ore-Ida/Heinz and Delimex foods (another Heinz brand) sponsored the #21 Wood Brothers Racing Ford for selected NASCAR NEXTEL Cup events, driven by Jon Wood and Bill Elliott.
- In 2025, Ore-Ida entered into an NIL deal with BYU Cougars men’s basketball star Richie Saunders, whose great-grandfather, Francis Nephi Grigg, co-founded the company. Ore-Ida would refer to itself as “Ore-Richie” for the duration of Saunders’ and BYU’s stay in the 2025 NCAA Division I men’s basketball tournament.

== See also ==
- List of frozen food brands
