= Charles E. Bayless =

American academic

Charles E. Bayless (born November 2, 1942) is a former president of West Virginia University Institute of Technology and a regional vice president of West Virginia University. He retired from WVU Tech on June 30, 2008.He is the grandfather of triplets Jon Paige and Madison.

== Early life ==
Charles E. Bayless is a native of Dunbar, West Virginia. In High School, he attended Nitro High School and Greenbrier Military School. He graduated from West Virginia University Institute of Technology, in 1968 with a degree in Electrical Engineering. At Tech he was Vice-President of the Student Council and a member of Sigma Pi fraternity. He received an MBA in finance from University of Michigan, an MSEE degree in Electric Power Engineering and a Juris Doctor, both from WVU.

== Professional life ==
During college, Bayless worked several summer jobs for Kentucky Power and PPL Corporation. From 1972 to 1981 he was an attorney, then Director of Nuclear Fuel Supply and later Director of Special Corporate Projects for Consumer's Power Company of Jackson, Michigan. From 1981 to 1989, he was Senior VP and CFO of Public Service Company of New Hampshire. He was the CEO of Tucson Electric Power from 1989 to 1998. He then served as CEO of Illinois Power Company and later became President of West Virginia University Institute of Technology in 2004.

Bayless has served on the Board of Directors for several different companies. These were: Dynegy, Primary Energy, REcycled Energy Development, Commerce Energy, Thermon, Ontario Power Authority, Patina Oil and Gas, Pike Electric, Trigen Energy Inc, Aquilon Energy Services, West Virginia American Water, EPRI, TS Conductors, The Puerto Rico Electric Power Authority, and Edison Electric Institute and was a founder and Board Member of New Energy Ventures. He was the Chairman of the Board for Independent Wireless One. He is a Member of the Judging Panel for the Platts Global Energy Awards. He serves on the Advisory Boards of The Angeleno Group and Energy Impact partners.

== Volunteerism ==
Bayless has been extensively involved with the Boy Scouts of America, he has been a council President, a former member of the National Executive Board, where he was Vice president for venturing and is currently a member of the National Advisory Board. He is a recipient of the Distinguished Eagle Scout Award, Silver Beaver Award, and Silver Antelope Award. He served as the chairman of the Southern Arizona Leadership Council. He was a member of the University of Arizona Business School Board of Advisors and the Arizona Commission on Appellate Judicial Appointments. He was also vice president of the Tucson Metropolitan Chamber of Commerce. and is past Co-Chair of the Climate Institute.
