= Court of Honor =

Official event constituted to determine various questions of social protocol

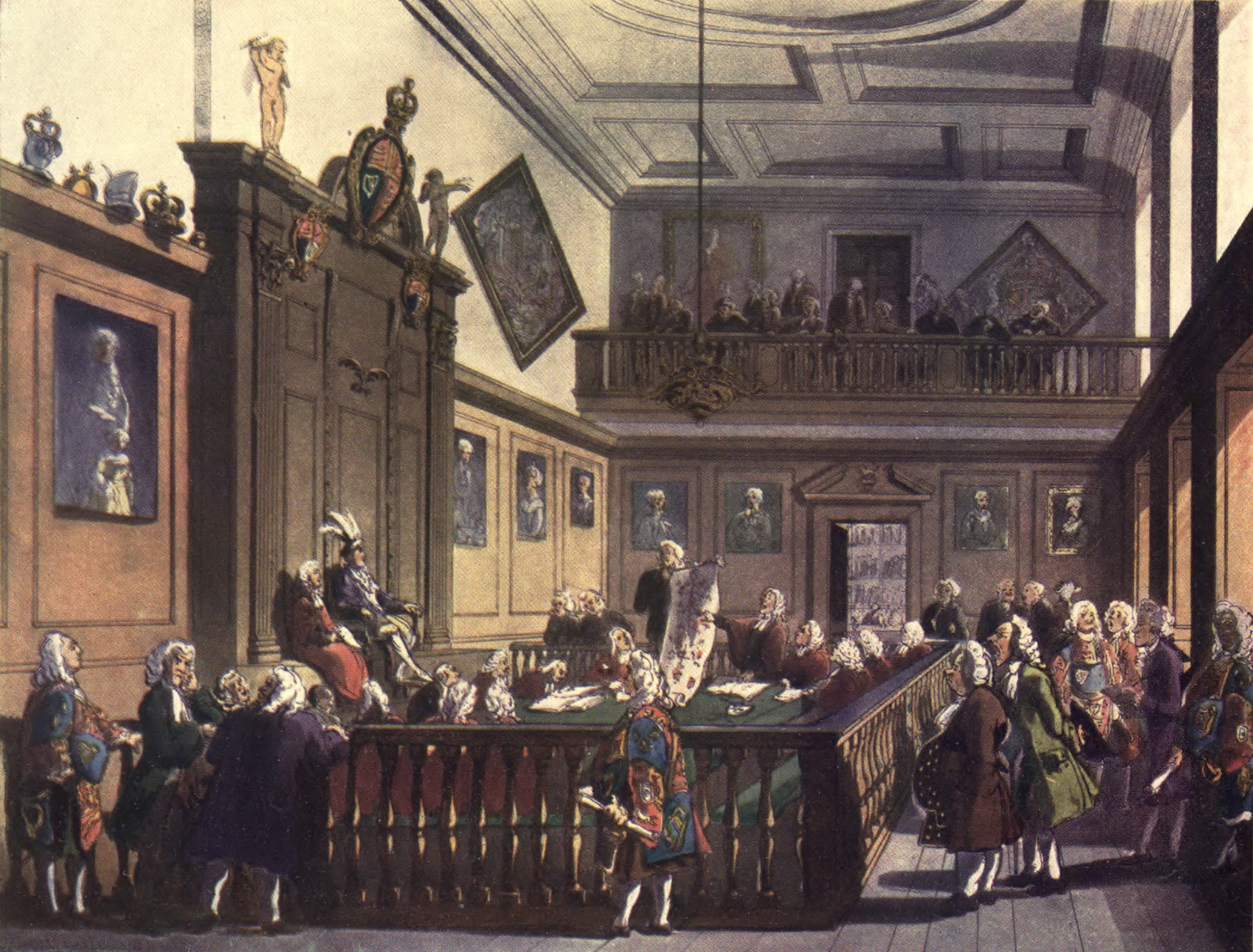
A session of the Court of Chivalry being held in the College of Arms, depicted in 1809.

A court of honor (or court of honour) is an official event constituted to determine various questions of social protocol, breaches of etiquette, and other allegations of breaches of honor, or entitlement to various honors. In English the term is also an architectural term (see Cour d'Honneur).

== Court of Chivalry ==
Jurisdiction of Constable and Marshal Act 1389
- Act of Parliament
- Parliament of England
- Long title: The authority of the constable of England, and the remedy where it is abused.
- Citation: 13 Ric. 2. Stat. 1. c. 2
- Territorial extent: England and Wales; Ireland

Dates
- Royal assent: 1389
- Commencement: 17 January 1390 (Note: Start of session.)
- Repealed: 15 August 1879

Other legislation
- Repealed by: Civil Procedure Acts Repeal Act 1879

Status: Repealed

Text of statute as originally enacted

The Court of Chivalry was at one time also known as the "Court of Honour". In British law, the Court of Chivalry was a court held before the Earl Marshal and the Lord High Constable; since the abolition of the office of the Lord High Constable, it has been conducted by the Earl Marshal alone. It was established by the Jurisdiction of Constable and Marshal Act 1389 (13 Ric. 2. Stat. 1. c. 2). This court had jurisdiction to try cases concerning contracts and other matters concerning deeds and acts of war. The Court of Chivalry also has jurisdiction over disputes regarding heraldry and rights to use coats of arms. The Court of Chivalry is not a court of record, and as such has no power to enforce its decisions by fine or imprisonment; as such it became relatively disused. It is not obsolete, however, and cases have been brought before the Court of Chivalry as recently as 1954.

== Military ==
A court of honor can also be a military court to investigate and issue judgments concerning acts or omissions which are considered to be unbecoming to an "officer and a gentleman", but which do not rise to the level where they are considered crimes triable under military law.

== Dueling ==
A court of honor is also the name given to a tribunal of noblemen who would decide whether a grievance over a point of honor rose to the level warranting a duel, and if so set rules for its fair conduct.

== Scouting ==
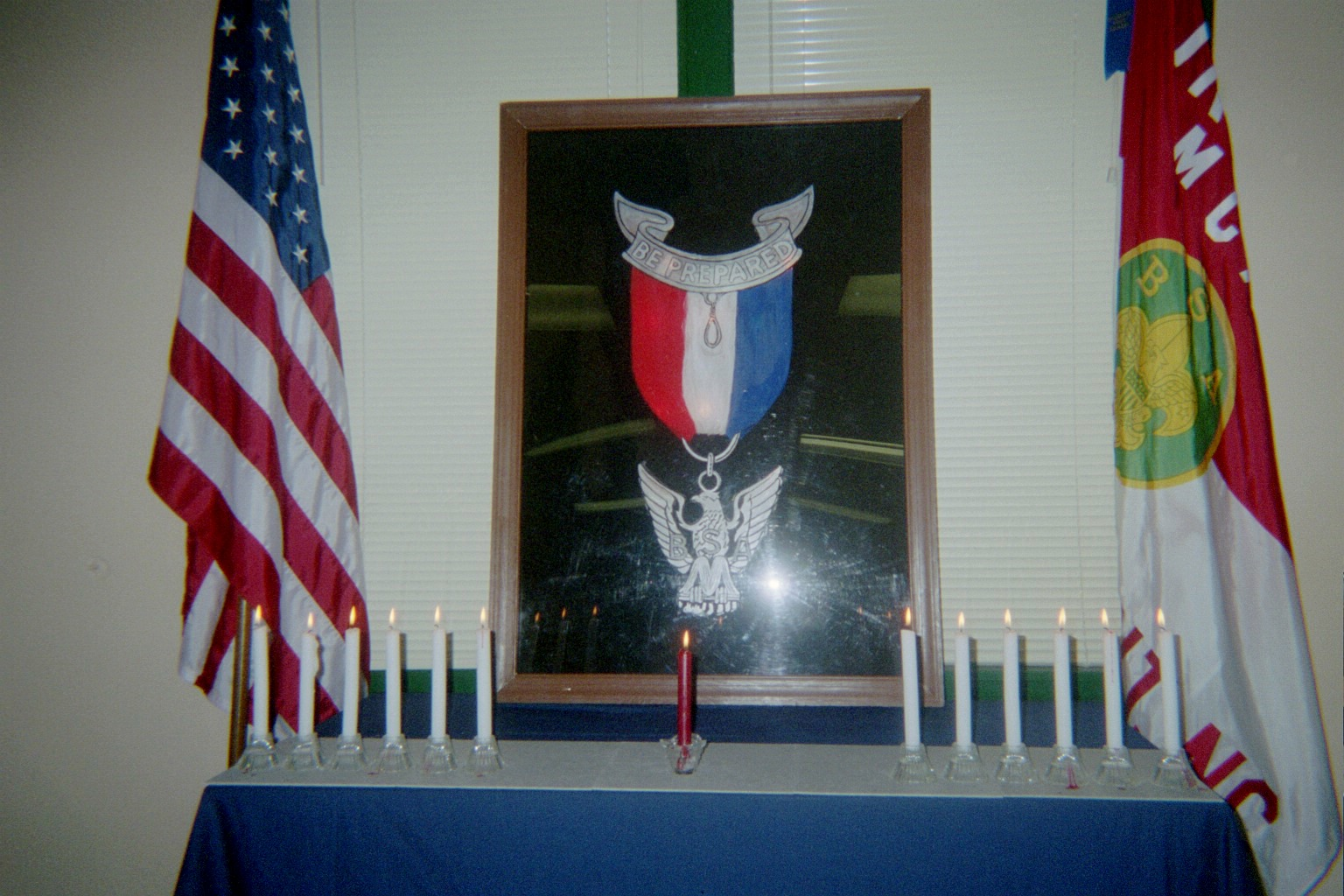
Scouting Court of Honor

Many Scouting organizations use the term "Court of Honor" to refer to a meeting of Patrol Leaders in the Scout troop to plan activities with their Scout Leaders.

In the Boy Scouts of America a court of honor is a formal troop ceremony usually held quarterly (and intermittently upon conferment of Eagle Scout rank) where Scouts and their families come together to receive rank advancement, merit badges, and other awards. It is also important for Scouts to participate in a court of honor because it counts towards the Second Class requirement 1a and First Class requirement 1a. It is not a regular troop meeting.

In the BSA, the National Court of Honor is the body that approves certain awards such as the Heroism Award, Honor Medal, and Honor Medal With Crossed Palms. Other awards under the purview of the National Court of Honor are the Silver Beaver, Silver Antelope, and the Silver Buffalo.

In the Scout Association of Japan a formal troop advancement ceremony is held once a year where Scouts receive rank advancement, merit badges, and other awards, and Scouts in the same school year receive the same rank advancement. It is uncommon for the Scouts' family members to attend, as it is a regular troop meeting.

In the Boy Scouts of the Philippines, a Court of Honor is a formal ceremony for conferment of the Eagle Scout rank medal on a Boy Scout. The National Court of Honor is a unit in the organization which determines and decides on various important conferments for Scouts and Scouters.

In Scouts South Africa, a court of honour is held every four weeks, normally at the beginning of a new month. The Patrol Leaders (PLs) and a Scouter are expected to attend, they are responsible for the majority of decisions regarding troop discipline, patrol management, troop programme and such. The Troop Scouter is the only adult leader regularly attending these meetings, and has the right to veto decisions. The Troop Scouter generally only acts in an advisory role, allowing the Scouts themselves to make important decisions. The Court of Honour may invite other Scouters to hear their input.
