= RollinGreens =

American food brand

- Company type: Private company
- Industry: Frozen foods
- Predecessor: RollinGreens
- Founded: 2015; 11 years ago
- Founders: Ryan Cunningham, Lindsey Cunningham
- Headquarters: Boulder, Colorado, USA
- Key people: Ryan Cunningham, Lindsey Cunningham
- Products: Millet Tots
- Number of employees: 2 (2019)
- Website: rollingreens.com

RollinGreens is an American convenience food brand based in Colorado. The company's primary product is "Millet Tots", a wholegrain version of tater tots.

== Company history ==
The company began as a food delivery truck service in May 2015, operated by owners Ryan and Lindsey Cunningham. It was named after a similar delivery service run by Ryan Cunningham's parents in the 1980s. In 2015, they switched to producing packaged frozen food, closing the truck delivery business to focus on producing Millet Tots for sale through third-party outlets. RollinGreens partnered with Sage V Foods in 2016 for distribution and manufacturing purposes. By 2017 the company's product was sold in a small number of outlets around their local area, and they began the process of raising $500,000 capital investment in order to expand nationwide.

== Millet Tots ==
Millet Tots are RollinGreens principal product. They are made from millet sourced primarily from CleanDirt Farm in Colorado. The product is made in three varieties: Original, Italian Herb, and Spicy Sweet.
