= Ross Erin Butler Sr. =

American businessman

- Born: 16 June 1916; Manard, Blaine County, Idaho, United States
- Died: 3 July 2004 (aged 88); Ontario, Oregon, United States
- Resting place: Valley View Cemetery, Vale, Oregon; Map of Valley View Cemetery
- Education: University of Idaho, Bachelor of Science in Business
- Known for: Original board member of Ore-Ida Foods
- Board member of: Ore-Ida Foods, Chairman of Vale Union High School District Board, Boy Scouts of America Ore-Ida council
- Spouse: Margie Dawn Werry
- Awards: Boy Scouts of America Silver Beaver Award, Silver Antelope Award, Hall of Fame Award for BSA Ore-Ida Council, BSA Woodbadge Award 1952, Brigham Young University-Idaho Presidential Service Award, University of Idaho Silver & Gold Award

Ross Erin Butler Sr. (16 June 1916 – 3 July 2004) was an officer and original board of directors member of Ore-Ida Foods, and executive board director of Boy Scouts of America's (BSA) Ore-Ida Council for 64 years.

== Early life ==
Born near Fairfield, Idaho, Ross was the ninth of eleven children of John and Bertha Thurber Butler. In 1917 the Butlers moved to Acequia, Idaho, and then again in 1922 to Twin Falls, where Ross began his schooling and his business career by selling newspapers at age four. In 1926 the family moved to Hollister, Idaho, where they lived until moving to Eden, Idaho, in 1933. While living in Eden Ross finished high school and met his future wife, a classmate in the class of '35 named Margie Dawn Werry. She was the daughter of Ezra Joseph Werry and Dot Allred and was born 12 October 1916 in Bellevue, Idaho. Ross and Margie were married in Moscow, Idaho on 19 September 1937. Ross graduated from the University of Idaho with a BS Business degree in 1939. In July 1939 the couple moved to Boise, Idaho, where Ross worked as an accountant for Idaho Power Company. In 1940 he transferred to Vale, Oregon, as their chief clerk.

== Birth of Ore-Ida Foods and the Tater Tot ==
In March 1946 Ross left Idaho Power to join F. Nephi Grigg and his brother, Golden, to form Grigg Bros. & Butler in real estate and insurance sales. He also worked to promote Grigg Bros. Produce, a sweet corn operation which eventually became Ore-Ida Foods, Inc. Ross managed the Grigg Bros. & Butler operation and served as corporate secretary and on the board of directors of Ore-Ida Foods. During this time the partnership also developed a brick-making operation named Oregon Clay Products, Vale Hot Springs Natatorium and Laundry, Oregon Feeding Company, Crown Cattle Company and other farming and industrial developments.

In 1961 the Butlers moved to Ontario, Oregon to be closer to the Ore-Ida Food headquarters. However, Ore-Ida Foods sold to H. J. Heinz Company in October 1965. Heinz maintained the executive group until September 1967 at which time Ross took over the Grigg Bros. & Butler Real Estate and Insurance offices in Vale and Ontario taking Gary Goodfellow as a partner. In 1978 Ross retired selling the business to Gary Goodfellow and Rusty Butler, their oldest son.

== Philanthropy ==
Ross was a charter member and past president of the Vale Lions Club, served five years as chairman of Vale Union High School District Board, was a Vale volunteer fireman, spent four years as the local president of American Association of Retired Persons (AARP), participated in the AARP Northwest Wellness Conferences for five years, and spent three years as president of the Malheur Country Historical Society being a charter member and prime mover on the first edition of the Malheur Country History book.

Both Ross and Margie gave considerable endowments to Brigham Young University (BYU), Utah Valley University (UVU), Treasure Valley Community College (TVCC), BYU-Idaho and University of Idaho. They enrolled in many classes from TVCC, even through their aging years. Margie was especially interested in the Native Indian culture and while enrolled in an archaeology class at TVCC led a dig. Ross and Margie delivered Meals on Wheels for many years together and participated and contributed to the opening of the Four Rivers Cultural Center.

== Scouting ==
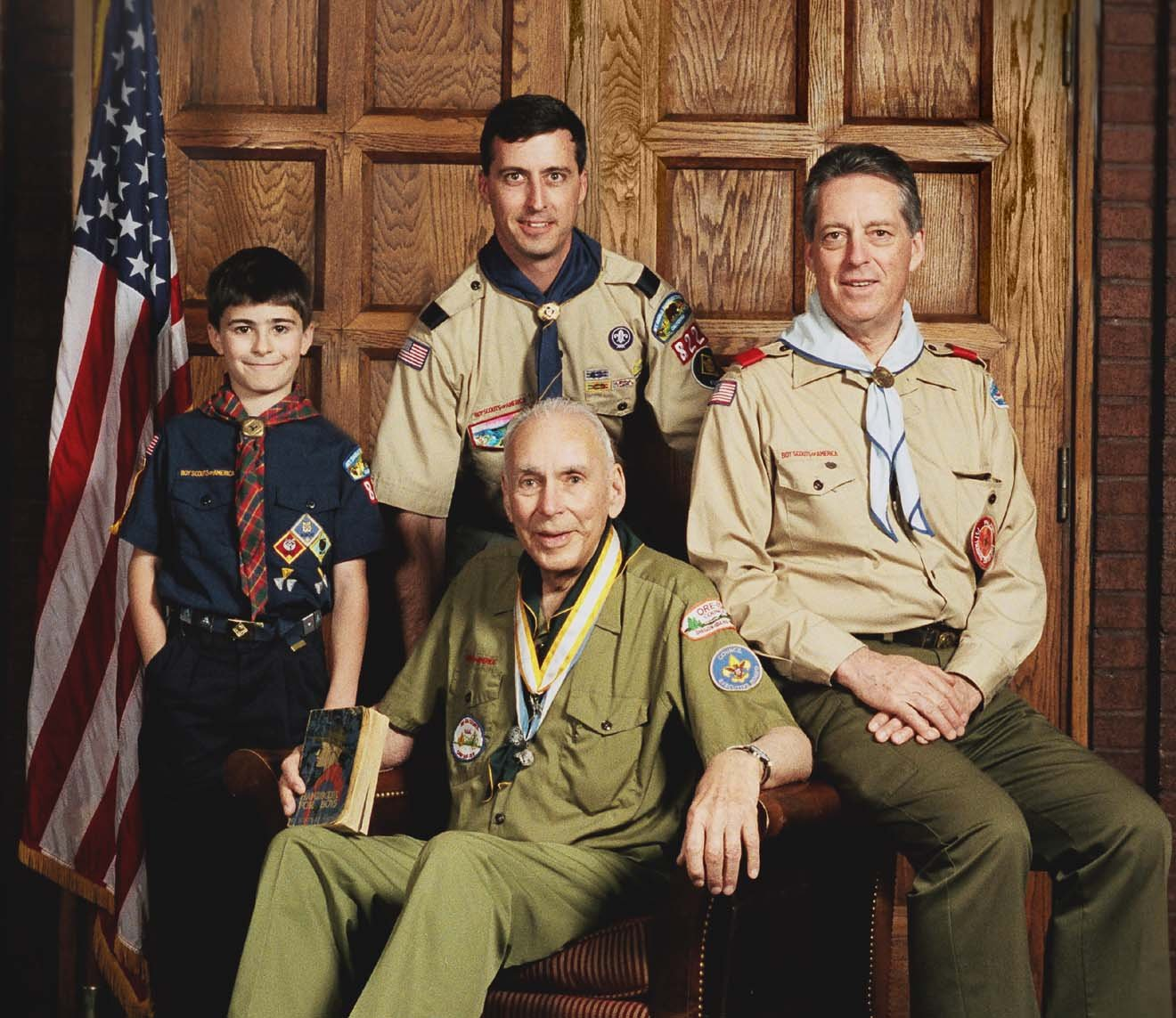
Ross Erin Butler Sr. (Lower Center), Ross Erin Butler IV (Left), Ross Erin Butler, III (Top Center), Ross Erin Butler Jr. (Right)

Ross was a registered Scout for 70 years and served on the National Council of the Boy Scouts of America. He has served as both the Assistant Finance and Finance Chairman for Western Region, Area II. He was a member of the Ore-Ida council and served on their executive board for 64 years. He was instrumental in building the Scout Service Center in Boise, Idaho. He served many years as a Scoutmaster and Troop Committeeman and traveled to many Area and National Jamborees.

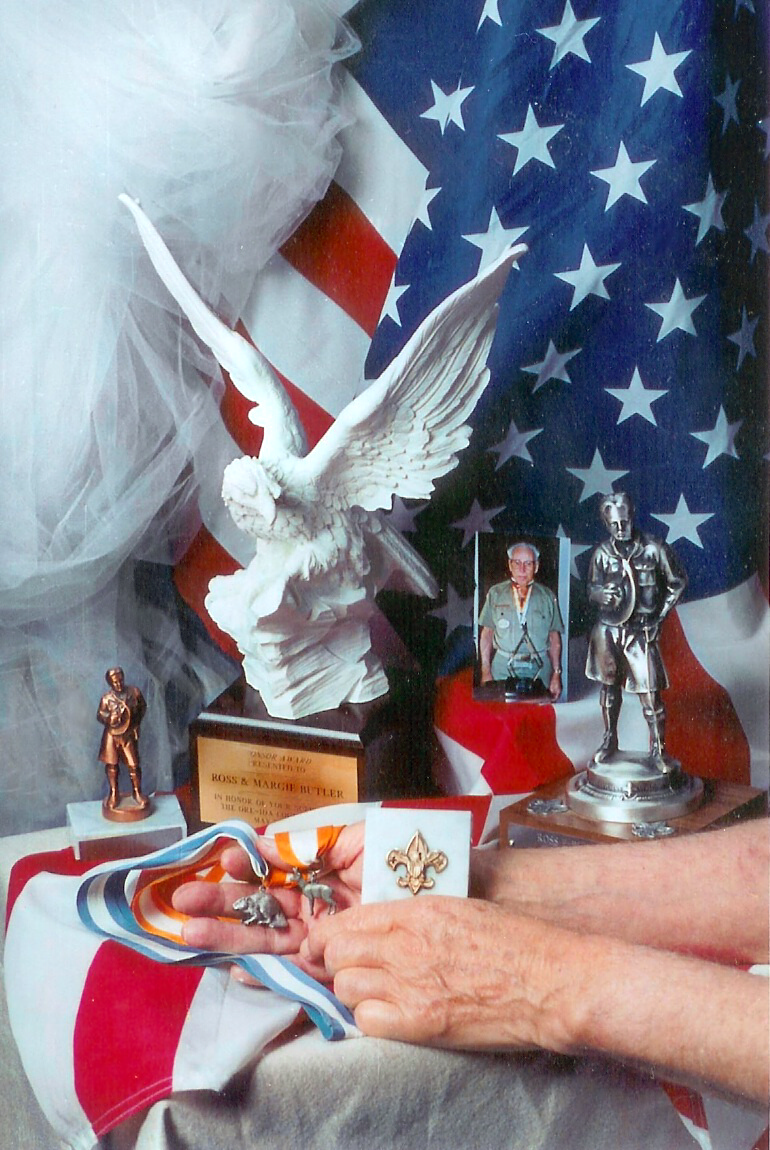
Butler received Boy Scout's highest awards, Silver Beaver, Silver Antelope and other Awards

Ross received the Ore-Ida Council distinguished service Silver Beaver Award in 1956 and the BSA Regional distinguished service Silver Antelope Award in 1991. In 1992 he was awarded the first Hall of Fame Award for the Ore-Ida Council. All four of Ross and Margie's sons are scouts and at the time of his death he counted 35 Eagle Scouts in his posterity - but by January 2012 that number had risen to 42. The Butler family spent many summers at BSA's Camp Billy Rice at Warm Lake, Idaho.

== Family ==
Ross and Margie were active in the Church of Jesus Christ of Latter-day Saints. Ross served as a counselor in the Vale Ward bishopric from 1942 to 1950, Nyssa Stake High Councilman from 1950 to 1952, Vale Ward bishop from 1956–1961, first counselor in the Nyssa Stake Presidency from 1961 to 1973, plus many other teaching and administrative positions. Margie served in the Nyssa Stake Relief Society Presidency and many teaching positions. In 1988 Ross and Margie served a one-year mission to Fresno, California. Ross worked in the Boise LDS Temple for the last two years of his life. Ross and Margie were interested in family history research. He was an advocate of family reunions and family organizations. Ross arranged for and worked with historian William G. Hartley to have his great grandfather John Lowe Butler and his grandfather Albert King Thurber's life stories written and published - "My Best for the Kingdom" and "Another Kind of Gold". Ross and Margie had nine children.

Margie died in May 2002 and Ross in July 2004. When Ross died, he was the last living founder of Ore-Ida Foods.

== See also ==
- Tater Tots
