= Richard Compton (disambiguation) =

Richard Compton was an American actor.

Richard Compton may also refer to:

- Richard Compton (cricketer) (born 1956), South African cricketer
- Richard G. Compton (born 1955), British chemist
- Richard A. Compton (1926–1993), American educator and hotelman
- Dick Compton (born 1940), American football player
