= Brigham Young High School =

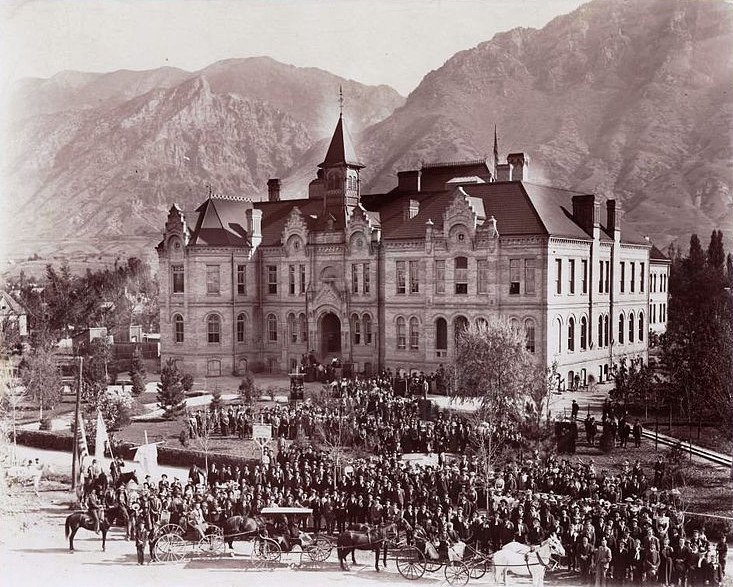
- Provo, Utah

Information
- Type: Private high school
- Religious affiliation: The Church of Jesus Christ of Latter-day Saints (Mormon)
- Established: 1903
- Founder: Brigham Young
- Status: Defunct
- Closed: 1968
- Oversight: Church Educational System
- Website: byhigh.org

Brigham Young High School was a private high school in Provo, Utah, United States, first known as Brigham Young Academy (BYA). The school later became attached to Brigham Young University (BYU), with its official name being Brigham Young University High School, commonly called B Y High. It operated under the Church Educational System of the Church of Jesus Christ of Latter-day Saints (LDS Church).

== History ==
When BYA was founded in October 1875, it focused on elementary through high school education. The independent school's curriculum was intended to align with LDS Church teachings, in contrast to the expanding state school system. Many of the early-day students were educated to become school teachers. In 1903, the institution was adjusted, with BYU and B Y High established as separate institutions. The high school closed in 1968 after 93 years. The main school building was renovated and now serves as the Provo City Library at Academy Square.

== Notable alumni ==
- Edward O. Anderson, architect for the LDS Church
- Brent F. Ashworth, historical documents collector
- Jae R. Ballif, BYU administrator
- R. Lanier Britsch, BYU professor of history
- Todd A. Britsch, BYU Vice President
- Kim S. Cameron, professor of business at the University of Michigan and Case Western Reserve University
- Orson Scott Card, popular science fiction novelist
- Benjamin Cluff, Principal of Brigham Young Academy
- James Smoot Coleman, professor in African Studies at UCLA
- Henry Aldous Dixon, Utah congressman and president of Weber College and Utah State Agricultural College, now Utah State University
- Howard R. Driggs, author and professor at the University of Utah and New York University
- Philo T. Farnsworth, inventor, "father of television"
- Lynn Fausett, painter
- Harvey Fletcher, physicist and inventor of hearing loss audio technologies
- Robert H. Hinckley, car dealer, also involved with politics and aviation policy
- Milton R. Hunter, General Authority of the LDS Church
- Mickey Ibarra, Director of Intergovernmental Affairs in the Clinton administration
- Fred L. Markham, Utah architect
- Dallin H. Oaks, legal scholar and president of the LDS Church
- Roger B. Porter, Harvard professor and presidential scholar
- Alma Richards, Olympic Gold medalist
- O. Leslie Stone, General Authority of the LDS Church
- Blaine Yorgason, LDS novelist
