= Ross Butler =

Ross Butler may refer to:

- Ross Butler (artist) (1907–1995), Canadian agricultural artist
- Ross Butler (politician) (born 1943), Australian politician
- Ross Butler (actor) (born 1990), American actor
- Ross Erin Butler Sr., founder of Ore-Ida Foods, inventor of the Tater Tot
