= Silver Beaver Award =

Council-level service award of Scouting America

- Silver Beaver medal and square knot
- Owner: Scouting America
- Country: United States
- Created: 1931
- Awarded for: Distinguished service to youth in a council
- Recipients: 50,000+
| Previous; District Award of Merit | Next; Silver Antelope Award |

The Silver Beaver Award is the council-level distinguished service award of Scouting America. Recipients of the award are registered adult leaders who have made an impact on the lives of youth through service given to the council.

Those deemed worthy of the award by their local council must be approved by the National Court of Honor. Upon their approval, recipients are presented with a silver beaver pendant suspended from a blue and white ribbon, as well as the corresponding square knot.

== History ==
The Silver Beaver was introduced in 1931 as a pin-on medal, but due to the heavy weight of the medallion it was switched over to a neck ribbon in mid-1932. A blue-white-blue ribbon bar was introduced in 1934 for informal uniform wear. In 1946, ribbon bars were replaced by the current knot insignia.

The Silver Beaver was initially awarded only to men. The Silver Fawn Award, an equivalent for women, was awarded starting in 1971. It used the same knot insignia, but on a blue background, as women were mostly involved in Cub Scouting during this period. The Silver Fawn was discontinued and the Silver Beaver began to be awarded to women in 1974. A total of 2,455 Silver Fawns were awarded to outstanding women for support of Cub Scouting before the award was discontinued in 1974.

Using the United States Military as the model, silver awards are the highest awards in Scouting America. Scouting America currently awards three silver awards, the Silver Beaver, the Silver Antelope and the Silver Buffalo.

== Notable recipients ==
- Elliot Quincy Adams
- Dean Alford
- Thomas D. Allen
- Marvin J. Ashton
- Brent F. Ashworth
- Charles August
- Ellsworth Hunt Augustus
- Mark Evans Austad
- Béla H. Bánáthy
- Curtis H. Barnette
- Harold Roe Bartle
- Charles J. Bates
- Charles E. Bayless
- Kevin Beary
- Julius W. Becton Jr.
- Ezra Taft Benson
- Richard J. Berry
- Lester E. Bond
- Howard P. Boyd
- Pat Boyd
- John F. Brady
- Rodney H. Brady
- Holly Broadbent Sr.
- Carl W. Buehner
- Hal Bunderson
- Allen M. Burdett Jr.
- Harris Burgoyne
- M. Anthony Burns
- Ross Erin Butler Sr.
- Chris Buttars
- Matt Cartwright
- Bernard A. Clarey
- Richard A. Compton
- Hazen A. Dean
- Albert W. Dent
- John Randolph Donnell
- Gordon R. England
- Bob Etheridge
- David C. Evans
- Michael D. Fascitelli
- Abraham J. Feldman
- George Fischbeck
- Craig Fitzhugh
- Mike Fitzpatrick
- Karen Fraser
- Ronald Alan Fritzsche
- Ken Garff
- Sandy Garrett
- Lloyd D. George
- John Gottschalk
- Francis A. Gregory
- Terry L. Grove
- Robert E. Guglielmone
- Wayne B. Hales
- Lee Heider
- Francisco Joglar Herrero
- Lewis Blaine Hershey
- George R. Hill III
- James G. Howes
- Peter W. Hummel
- Brad Hutto
- Paul Ilyinsky
- Peter Johnsen
- John C. Keegan
- William H. Keeler
- Walter Kidde
- Edgar J. Lauer
- Walter Livingston
- David M. Lockton
- Charles L. Mader
- Thomas P. Mahammitt
- François E. Matthes
- Morton D. May
- James M. McCoy
- Joseph Melrose
- Robert Mitchell
- Keith Monroe
- Thomas S. Monson
- Ellie Morrison
- Roger Mosby
- Horace A. Moses
- Wendell Nedderman
- Leonard Niederlehner
- Dan Ownby
- Ephraim Laurence Palmer
- Edward A. Pease
- Hector Perez
- Wayne M. Perry
- Hollie Pihl
- Skip Priest
- Ben Reifel
- Mark Ricks
- Brooks Robinson
- Emanuel A. Romero
- Edward L. Rowan
- Dan Rusanowsky
- Marvin Scott
- Robert G. Shaw, Sr
- Robert H. Shaffer
- Mark Shurtleff
- Max I. Silber
- Delford M. Smith
- George Albert Smith
- Robert Hall Smith
- Vaughn Soffe
- Carl E. Stewart
- Raymond H. Stockard
- Thomas L. Tatham
- John R. Taylor III
- Dick Vermeil
- Frank H. Wadsworth
- Walter Washington
- Laurence Hawley Watres
- Lance B. Wickman
- Lester B. Wikoff
- Cardis Cardell Willis
- Jack Zink
- Peter Zug
