= C. Hardy Redd =

American politician (born 1936)

Member of the Utah House of Representatives
- In office 1979–1985

Personal details
- Born: June 19, 1936 (age 90) Provo, Utah, U.S.
- Party: Republican
- Spouse: Sonya
- Children: 9
- Education: Brigham Young University; Utah State University

C. Hardy Redd (born June 19, 1936) is an American politician. He served as a Republican member of the Utah House of Representatives.

== Life and career ==
Redd was born in Provo, Utah. He attended Wasatch Academy, Brigham Young High School, Brigham Young University and Utah State University.

Redd was a member of the USU Board of Trustees.

Redd served in the Utah House of Representatives from 1979 to 1985.
