= Peter W. Hummel =

Vice-Chairman of the World Scout Committee

Peter West Hummel (4 July 1929 – 25 July 2015) was a geologist and oil company president, who served as the Vice-Chairman of the World Scout Committee as a Boy Scouts of America delegate to the World Organization of the Scout Movement.

Hummel was a Scout from his youth. From Nevada, he served locally before serving as International Commissioner of BSA in 1980, and in 1982 he became President of the National Committee of Cub Scouts.

== Background ==
In 1983, Hummel was awarded the 167th Bronze Wolf, the only distinction of WOSM, awarded by the World Scout Committee for exceptional services to world Scouting. In 1982, he was received as a member of the Baden-Powell Companions in recognition of his action for World Scouting. In addition, he was decorated with the Silver Beaver, Silver Antelope and Silver Buffalo.

A graduate of Stanford and Harvard Business School, he worked in ore mining in Nevada and in the Rocky Mountains. Involved for 25 years in the mining commission of Nevada, he worked to create the current rules for the exploration and exploitation of the mineral resources. He was married and the father of four sons, all of whom are Eagle Scouts, and a daughter.
