= King's Landing Cemetery =

Historic cemetery located in Rochester, New York

King's Landing Cemetery (Hanford's Landing Cemetery)
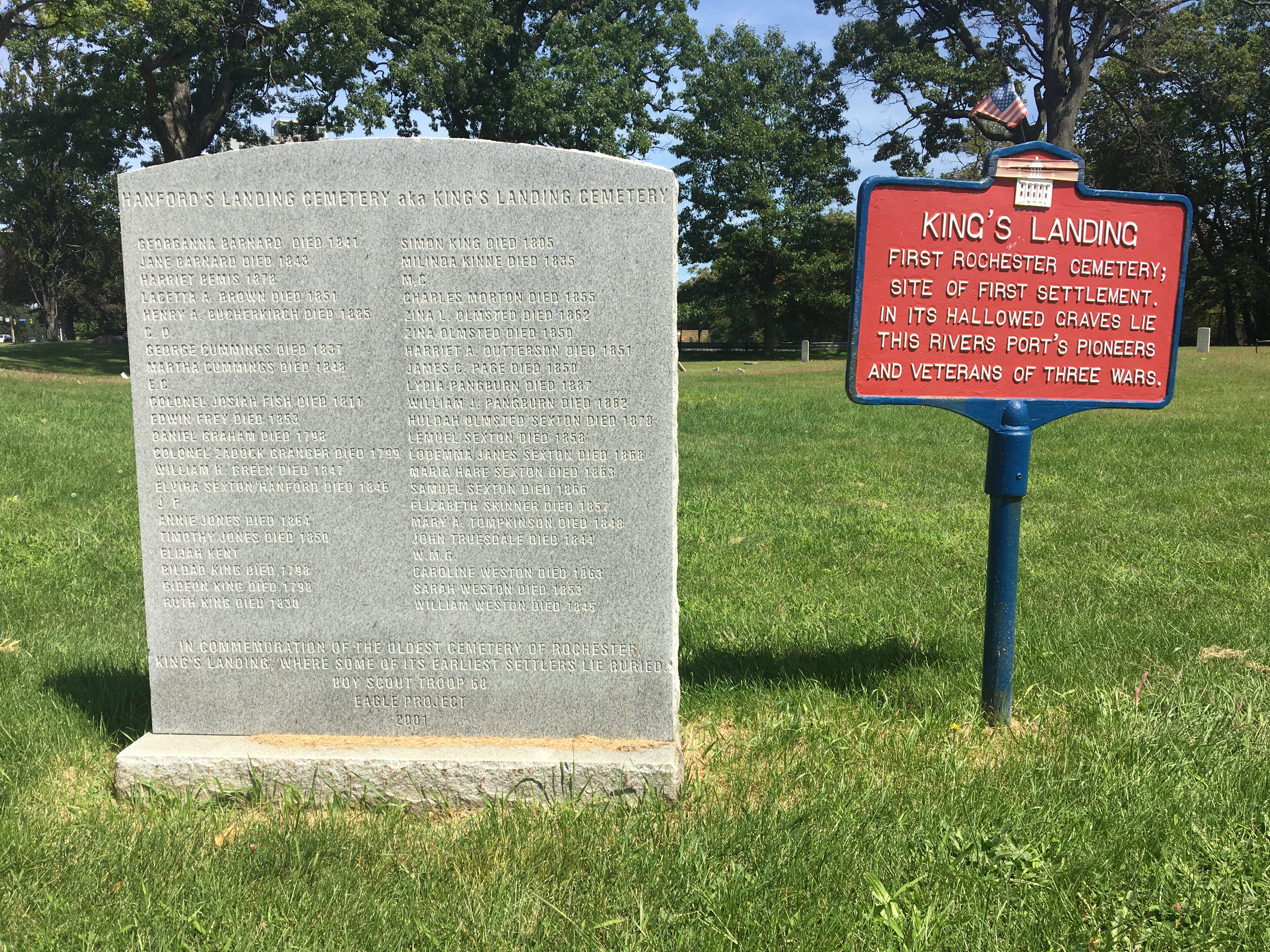
- Signs at front of King's Landing Cemetery in Rochester, NY
- Interactive map of King's Landing Cemetery (Hanford's Landing Cemetery)

Details
- Established: 1798
- Location: Rochester, New York
- Country: US
- Coordinates: 43.202228°N 77.627453°W
- Owned by: The Eastman Kodak Company
- Find a Grave: King's Landing Cemetery

King's Landing Cemetery (also known as Hanford's Landing Cemetery) in Rochester, New York, was founded in 1798 at the site of the first European settlement in the Rochester area, and is the first cemetery to be established in the city. The cemetery is named after Gideon King, who came to the area in 1796, died two years later, and is buried in the cemetery with his two sons.

"King's Landing" refers to the landing point on the Genesee River, below the bluffs on which the cemetery is located. After the original settlement was disbanded in 1809, the area was resettled by seven brothers by name of Hanford, from Rome, New York, and thereafter came to be known as "Hanford's Landing".

The cemetery is currently maintained by the Eastman Kodak Company. Many of the grave sites are unmarked, but some gravestones are scattered throughout the cemetery. A large monument at the front of the cemetery lists known graves by name and date of death. It was created in 2001 as part of a public-service project by Boy Scout Troop 68.

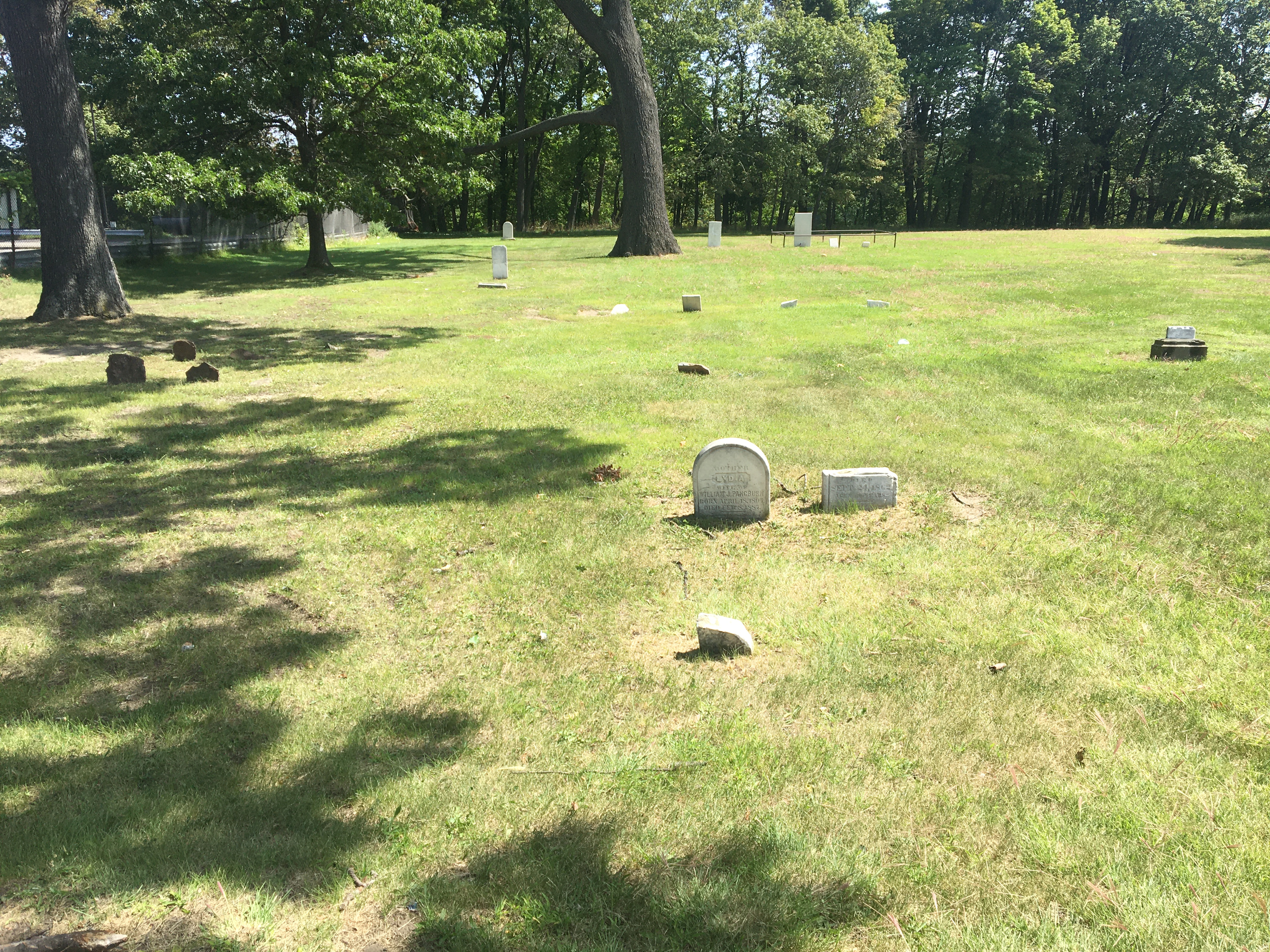
Graves in King's Landing Cemetery, Rochester, New York.
