= Edward L. Rowan =

American psychiatrist, sex therapist and author

Edward Leslie Rowan (born October 31, 1940) is a retired psychiatrist, sex therapist, active author, and Scouting leader from Exeter, New Hampshire. He has been associated with the Boy Scouts of America (BSA) for over 50 years and is a recipient of the Distinguished Eagle Scout Award (DESA) from the BSA in 1992.

Rowan was born October 31, 1940, in Danbury, Connecticut. He received a BA from Yale University in 1962, an MD from SUNY Downstate Medical Center in 1966, a MS from Ohio State University in 1970, and a graduate certificate in Museum Studies from Tufts University.

Rowan's lifelong interest in Scouting began when he was a youth. He earned the Eagle Scout rank in 1955. He also received the Explorer Silver Award in 1957 and later, the St. George Award. Rowan has served as curator of both the Lawrence Lee Scouting Museum in New Hampshire and the Las Vegas International Scouting Museum and as council vice-president and council commissioner for many years.

In addition, he was editor of Scouting Memorabilia for the Lee Museum. His volunteer and professional Scouting positions include Cubmaster, Scoutmaster, district chairman, district commissioner, Wood Badge course director, National Camp School director, and staff at six national jamborees. In addition to being honored with the DESA, Rowan has been awarded the Silver Beaver Award and Silver Antelope Award.

Rowan's professional career included the publication of several books that focus on mental health, sex and sexual abuse, and Scouting. He has published articles in American Journal of Psychiatry, Journal of Sex Education and Therapy – including an article on the BSA handbook and masturbation, Journal of Correctional and Social Psychiatry, and the International Scouting Collectors Association Journal.

In his book Understanding Child Sexual Abuse, Rowan discusses a 1998 study at Temple University which stated: "while child sexual abuse was morally and legally wrong and obviously devastating to some individuals, it was not inherently and inevitably harmful." He goes on to explain the lasting changes in survivors' ability to regulate emotion, and in cognition and memory. In discussing treatment of the victim and perpetrator, he states that treatment does not seem to reduce the rate of perpetrator recidivism and that prevention is also "elusive". Rowan encourages parents to educate their children on the dangers of sexual abuse, highlighting new prevention programs of the Roman Catholic Church and Boy Scouts of America.

Rowan wrote The Joy of Self-Pleasuring : Why Feel Guilty About Feeling Good? This was published in the year 2000.

== Works ==
- Rowan, MD, Edward L. (2005). Cass Street Stories. Exeter, NH: Publishing Works, Inc. ISBN 1-933002-09-3.
- Rowan, MD, Edward L. (2009). Mothers of Scouting: Baden-Powell and the Women Who Influenced Him. Exeter, NH: Publishing Works. ISBN 978-1-935557-13-5.
- Rowan, MD, Edward L. (2000). The Joy of Self-Pleasuring: Why Feel Guilty About Feeling Good?. Amherst, NY: Prometheus Books. ISBN 1-57392-795-3.
- Rowan, MD, Edward L. (2005). To Do My Best: James E. West and the History of the Boy Scouts of America. Exeter, NH: Publishing Works. ISBN 0-9746479-1-8.
- Rowan, MD, Edward L. (2006). Understanding Child Sexual Abuse. Jackson, MS: University Press of Mississippi. ISBN 1-57806-806-1.
