= Brent F. Ashworth =

American collector

- Born: January 8, 1949 (age 77); Albany, California, U.S.

Brent Ferrin Ashworth (born January 8, 1949) is an American historical document dealer who specializes in Mormon history. He has assisted the Glenn Beck organization, the LDS Church History Library, Brigham Young University (BYU) Library Special Collections, the Utah Valley University (UVU) Library Special Collections, State History Division, including the Utah State Archives and other major institutions. He has recently assisted Beck with his first three history museums, starting with "Man in the Moon" at the Grand America Hotel in Salt Lake City, over the July 4th holiday in 2013, and the Fiftieth Anniversary of the Kennedy Assassination in conjunction with the Mercury One Convention at the Omni Hotel in Dallas, Texas, in November 2013. Ashworth has donated many books and other items in his collection to the LDS Church and his items have been displayed at the Crandall Historical Printing Museum in Provo, Utah.

== Biography ==
Brent is the first son and child of Dell Shepherd and Bette Jean Brailsford Ashworth. Brent graduated from Brigham Young High School as student body president in 1966-67. He entered BYU in 1967, graduating cum laude with a BA in History and Political Science in 1972. He served in the U.S. Army Reserves, and was called to active duty at Ft. Ord, California in 1969.

Brent received a Juris Doctor degree from the University of Utah College of Law in 1975. He served in Price, Utah as Assistant Carbon County Attorney (1975–76), beginning with the Sundowner Motorcycle murder case and briefly practiced law with the Price firm of Frandsen & Keller (1976–77). He served as Secretary of the South-Eastern Utah Bar Association in 1977. He then worked as Vice President-General Counsel and Corporate Secretary for Nature's Sunshine Products in Spanish Fork and Provo, Utah (1977-2003), was Vice President-General Counsel of Neways International of Springville, Utah (2003–05) and has been a legal consultant for Shaklee Corporation in Pleasanton, California (2005–06). Currently, he is General Counsel of Zija International, Inc., in Lehi, Utah (2012 - current) and continues a part-time, private law practice in Provo. In 2006, he founded B. Ashworth's, Inc., a Provo-based business dealing in rare documents, books, art, collectibles and other curiosities. His firm deals primarily in rare U. S. History, Mormon and Western material, but handles other significant items from around the world.

Brent, while living in Payson, Utah (1977–82), served as a city councilman (1979–82) and as acting mayor (1982). Additionally, he has served in a number of other capacities, including as president of Deseret Village for the handicapped, in Spanish Fork (1988–90), president of the Utah Society of the Sons of the American Revolution (1991–92), on the American Red Cross board (1988–94), as vice president of the Squaw Peak Chapter of the Sons of Utah Pioneers (1994–95), as president of the Emily Dickinson Society of Utah (1995–97), board member and chairman of the Provo Landmarks Commission (1997-date), board member and chairman of the Provo Library Board (2000–06), as Trustee of the Springville Museum of Art (1998-01), as a board member of the Celebration of Health Foundation (1998-2005) and as a both a board member and as president of the Fort Douglas Military Museum Association at Ft. Douglas, Utah (2009-2014). Ashworth has also been president of the Provo Kiwanis Club (1992–93), then later as Lt. Governor (2001–02), Governor (2009–10) and Immediate Past Governor (2010–11) of the Utah-Idaho District of Kiwanis International. He served as General Counsel for the Brigham Young Academy Foundation (1995-02) and as Chairman of the Art Subcommittee of the Provo Library Construction Oversight Committee (1998–99). He also served the citizens of Provo, following his appointment by Provo Mayor Lewis Billings, as Co-Chairman of the Provo Sesquicentennial Committee (1998–99). He has served as a Trustee of the Crandall Historical Printing Museum since its founding (1998-date) and currently serves as board chairman (2013-). He puts on the annual historical printing display for the Utah Printer's Hall of Fame (2009-). He is the 2014 winner of the Utah State Historical Societies, Outstanding contribution award, Utah's highest award for individual contribution for the preservation of history.

Ashworth has served on the Executive Board of the Utah National Parks Council, Boy Scouts of America (2000–09), as a Board Member of the American Heritage School, in American Fork, Utah (2002–05), and as a member of the Provo School District Foundation (1997-2005). As a member of the board of the Celebration of Health Foundation, Ashworth helped to raise funds to build facilities for parents and families to stay while their young children are in the Intensive Care Units (ICU's), at the Utah Valley Regional Medical Center in Provo, and the Orem Community Hospital in Orem, Utah. Ashworth is a recipient of the Patriot Medal (1992), the highest honor presented by the Utah Society, Sons of the American Revolution, the Provo Mayor's Award of Excellence (1999), for serving as the Co-Chairman of the Provo Sesquicentennial Celebration (1998–99), the George S. Hixon (2000), Reed Culp (2002) and Lifetime Service (2010) medals from Kiwanis International. He has received the Silver Beaver Award from the Boy Scouts of America (2006), and in 2011, was chosen as one of the first recipients (#93 nationwide), of the Outstanding Eagle Scout Award, presented by the National Council of the Boy Scouts of America. His seven sons are also Eagle Scouts. With Louis Crandall of Provo, he co-founded the George E. Freestone Boy Scout Museum in Provo (2000–08).

== Family ==
Ashworth met Charlene Mills, the daughter of Gayland Ranson “Mike” and Margaret Mills of Tempe, Arizona at BYU. They are members of the Church of Jesus Christ of Latter-day Saints (LDS Church). They were married December 16, 1970, by O. Leslie Stone in the church's Salt Lake Temple. They have nine children: Amy Josephine (1973), John Dell (1975), Matthew Ferrin (1977), Samuel Mills (1978, deceased in 1985), Adam Parrish (1979, deceased in 2023), David Alden (1981), Emily Bette (1983), Luke Ranson (1986) and Benjamin Richard (1988). They also have thirteen grandchildren. In addition to other service in the LDS Church, Ashworth served on the Provo Oak Hills Stake high council (1993–98).

== See also ==
- William E. McLellin
- Salamander letter
- Utah National Parks Council
