= Wayne B. Hales =

American educator (1893–1980)

Wayne Brockbank Hales (1893 – May 3, 1980) was an American physicist, educator and academic administrator. He was president of Snow College from 1921 to 1924. He also taught at Ricks College (1916–21) and Weber College (1926–30), before joining Brigham Young University in 1930, where he remained until his retirement in 1972.

== Biography ==
Hales was born in Spanish Fork, Utah, the son of Jonathan Hyrum Hales and Martha Ann Brockbank. As a youth Hales worked with his father in the Tintic Mines. He earned a bachelor's degree from Brigham Young University (BYU) in 1916. He had lettered in both track and basketball while at BYU. Hales was the scoutmaster of the first troop in Provo and was given the Silver Beaver in 1942 for his commitment to scouting.

After graduating from BYU Hales taught at Ricks College (now BYU-Idaho) from 1916 to 1921. He served as president of Snow College from 1921 to 1924. When Hales went to Snow its name was Snow Academy, and its name was changed to Snow Junior College in 1922. He was also the first leader of the institution to hold the title of president. Over the years he pursued advanced degrees at the University of Chicago and the University of Utah. He focused full-time on studies from 1924 to 1926 at the California Institute of Technology culminating in a Ph.D. Among those who Hales studied under were Albert A. Michelson and Robert A. Millikan.

In 1926–1930 Hales taught at Weber College (now Weber State University) he then joined BYU as the physics department. He was the only faculty member in the department and taught all the classes. During World War II Hales was the coordinator for the BYU affiliated civilian pilot training corps' ground school. In 1950 Hales served as the chair of BYU's Diamond Jubilee Committee. He was the dean of the General College of BYU from 1958 to 1964. Later in the 1960s he was chairman of BYU's athletic committee. Besides physics Hales also taught courses at BYU in astronomy, meteorology, mechanics, math and photography. Hales taught the first classes in photography at BYU and was involved in forming the BYU Photo Studio. Hales also served as chairman of BYU's athletics council in 1952–1967.

He became an emeritus professor in 1972 but continued to show up at BYU every day. Among other projects he wrote some of the typescripts used as sources for the four volume centennial history of BYU. He also taught in BYU's continuing education department until his death.

Hales for a time was editor of the BYU Physics and Astronomy Newsletter. He was one of the bishops called to preside over one of the first wards in the first BYU stake. He was also the first president of the BYU 5th Stake. Hales later served as a stake patriarch in the LDS Church.

In 1916, Hales was married to Isabel Ethel Wilson. They had six children. Isabel died in 1963. Hales later married Vivian Parkinson.

== Awards and honors ==
He was elected a fellow of the American Association for the Advancement of Science in 1934. After his death, a Wayne B. Hales memorial scholarship was established in his honor.
