= Kim S. Cameron =

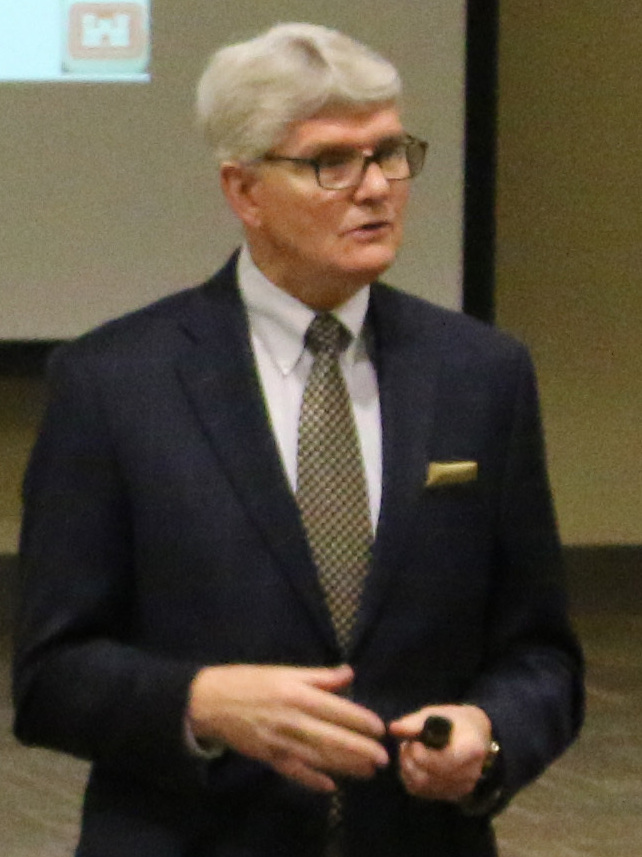
Cameron in 2016

Kim Sterling Cameron (born 1946) is the William Russell Kelly Professor of Management and Organizations at the Ross School of Business at the University of Michigan. He was formerly the dean of the Weatherhead School of Management at Case Western Reserve University. He has also served as associate dean at both the Marriott School of Management at Brigham Young University (BYU) and in the Ross School of Business.

== Education ==
He graduated from Brigham Young High School in Provo, Utah in 1964. He received a bachelor's degree (1970) and a master's degree (1971) from BYU. At BYU, he served as student body vice president, was a basketball player, and dated Ann Davies (who later married Mitt Romney). He later went on to earn a master's degree (1976) and a Ph.D. (1978) in administrative sciences from Yale University in New Haven, Connecticut.

== Career ==
After earning a master's degree at BYU, Cameron became a faculty member at Ricks College in Rexburg, Idaho. After earning his degrees at Yale University, he served on the faculty in the School of Business at the University of Wisconsin in Madison, then directed the Organizational Studies division of the National Center for Higher Education Management Systems in Boulder, Colorado. He joined the faculty in the Graduate School of Business at the University of Michigan in 1984.

In 1995, Cameron was appointed associate dean in the Marriott School of Management at BYU, and in 1998 he was appointed dean of the Weatherhead School of Management at Case Western Reserve University in Cleveland, Ohio. In 2001, he rejoined the faculty in the Ross School of Business at the University of Michigan and served as an associate dean.

He has written or edited 15 scholarly books and been published in more than 130 academic articles. He was cited as one of the top ten scholars in organizational studies whose work has been downloaded from Google.

Cameron co-founded the Center for Positive Organizational Scholarship at the University of Michigan, and his work in conjunction with the center was recognized as one of the top 20 high-impact ideas of 2004 by Harvard Business Review.

Among other ideas, Cameron advanced the notion that downsizing is usually not an effective business strategy because of the ways it is implemented. Cameron's latest scholarly work on Positive Leadership and on developing organizational cultures of abundance reports empirical research demonstrating that positive leadership and virtuous practices in organizations lead to extraordinary performance.

== Personal life ==
Cameron is married to Melinda Cummings, daughter of Hollywood actor Robert Cummings. They are parents of seven children.

=== Church involvement ===
Cameron is an active member of the Church of Jesus Christ of Latter-day Saints. He wrote several articles for the Encyclopedia of Mormonism and served as president of the church's Ann Arbor Michigan Stake. Since 2001, he has served as the patriarch in the Ann Arbor stake.
