= Hazen A. Dean =

Hazen A. Dean (1899–1984) was the first Kentuckian to receive the "70 Continuous Years of Service Award" from the Boy Scouts of America in 1983. He was a Scoutmaster for over 50 years. He was Scoutmaster for Owensboro, Kentucky's oldest troop, Troop 24, for 35 years, from 1949 till his death in January 1984. Hazen Dean was born in Michigan.

== Awards ==
Among many honors, he received Scoutmaster's Key and Silver Beaver Awards from the Boy Scouts of America. He was recognized for having mentored 86 Eagle Scouts, the most in nation at that time. He also received the Lt. Governor's Outstanding Kentuckian Award in 1982 from then Lt. Governor and later Governor of Kentucky Martha Layne Collins.

Kentucky historical marker #1747 was erected in downtown Owensboro, Kentucky and dedicated by a special public ceremony hosted by then U.S. Senator Wendell H. Ford and Owensboro Mayor Jack C. Fisher and Bryan Smeathers; one of Dean's 86 Eagle Scouts who earned the award in 1975.

== See also ==
- List of Eagle Scouts (Boy Scouts of America)
