= Robert H. Shaffer =

Robert H. Shaffer (September 13, 1915 – April 21, 2017) was an American pioneer in the field of college student personnel and student affairs. His work spanned the course of four decades (c. 1940–1981), which can be characterized as a period of "incredible growth and social and political change in American Society."

Believing that those who enter the field of student affairs must be "human development experts," not simply administrators and bureaucrats, it was said that "his own understanding of human development...enabled him to have so great an impact on both the students he served as dean and those entering his field."

== Early life ==
Shaffer was born in 1915 in Delphi, Indiana. As a member of the Boy Scouts of America, he earned the Eagle Scout, Silver Beaver, and Distinguished Eagle Awards. He graduated from Mishawaka High School in 1932.

Shaffer was awarded a Rector scholarship in 1932 to attend DePauw University, where he was back-up quarterback on the 1933 football team, which for the season was unbeaten, untied, and unscored upon.

At DePauw he was active in the Sigma Chi fraternity and was president of the Interfraternity Council. He was also founding president of DePauw's chapter of Alpha Phi Omega, a national service fraternity. For his later work with fraternities, Shaffer was recognized by a number of individual fraternities, as well as with the Silver Medal Award from the National Interfraternity Conference and a special award from the Fraternity Executives Association. Eventually, he became a "Significant Sig", an award given by Sigma Chi to its notable members.

Shaffer graduated from DePauw with a degree in social science in 1936. After graduating, he moved to New York City and became the assistant to the director of personnel Boy Scouts of America.

He received his master's degree from Teachers College, Columbia University, in 1940. He enrolled in the doctoral program at New York University, from which he received the Ph.D. degree in 1945.

He met Marjorie Jane Fitch at the International House in New York City, and they married in 1940.

In 1941, Shaffer took his first student affairs position as an assistant to the dean of the school of business at Indiana University.

His academic career was interrupted with service in the US Army from 1943 to 1945. After basic and specialized training, he served in a replacement depot in Hawaii as a classification specialist. From there he was returned to the mainland US for officer training school, and was assigned to labor relations work at the Boston Port of Embarkation.

Upon returning to Indiana University in 1945, he was named assistant dean of students and director of the Veteran's Guidance Center.

== Career ==
Early on at Indiana, Shaffer had a wide variety of experiences. He worked with students in regards to health, housing, financial aid and academic issues. He worked with several associations of professional student affairs workers. In 1948, he was elected secretary of the American College Personnel Association (ACPA). In 1951, he was elected the first president of the newly formed American Personnel and Guidance Association (APGA), the forerunner of the present American Counseling Association.

Shaffer worked as dean of students at Indiana from 1955 until 1969. He proposed a successful student affairs research office as well as a faculty associate program at Indiana University. The program encouraged faculty involvement with resident student life. Shaffer spent much of his personal time working with international students. His commitment to issues related to international students led him to work in Thailand, Afghanistan, Saudi Arabia, and Malaysia. His numerous publications are landmarks in the field of student affairs, and throughout his career he has been a consultant to national educational and government organizations.

In 1956, Shaffer organized the student affairs division by function rather than by gender. This controversial approach allowed for the founding of various departments, such as residence life, orientation, financial aid, counseling, career placement and student health. Through the Vietnam War, the Civil Rights Movement, and the student protests surrounding these and many other issues, he engaged student concerns in ways that earned him the respect of both students and faculty. In recognition of his work, he received honorary doctorate degrees from both DePauw and Indiana University. Another innovation by Shaffer was his creation of an extern program for student affairs graduate students.

Shaffer served as an editor of the NASPA Journal in the late 1960s. After leaving his administrative post in 1969, he became chairman of the Department of College Student Personnel Administration. He retired from that post in 1981.

His first wife having died in 1987, Shaffer remarried in 1989 and lived with his second wife, Joye Coy Shaffer, in New Smyrna Beach, Florida, until his death. He turned 100 in September 2015, and died on April 21, 2017, at the age of 101.

== Bibliography ==
- Kirby, A. F.,& Woodard, D. . Career Perspectives in Student Affairs. Monograph Series, Volume 1. 1984-01-00
