= Jae R. Ballif =

American Mormon leader

- Born: March 1, 1931 (age 95); Provo, Utah, U.S.
- Education: B.A. – Brigham Young University (1953); Ph.D. – UCLA (1962)
- Occupations: Physicist, Academic Administrator, Author
- Employer: Brigham Young University
- Known for: Founding dean of BYU College of Physical and Mathematical Sciences; Provost of BYU (1979–1989)
- Notable work: Conceptual Physics (with William E. Dibble); In Search of Truth and Love

Jae R. Ballif (born 1931) was a provost of Brigham Young University (BYU).

Ballif was the son of Ariel S. Ballif and his wife, Artemesia Romney Ballif. Artemesia was the daughter of George S. Romney and Artemesia Redd, and the sister of Marion G. Romney. Jae's brother, Ariel, Jr., was prominent in Utah theater.

Ballif graduated from Brigham Young High School in Provo, Utah, in the Class of 1949. He then played football and received a bachelor's degree from BYU in 1953, graduating the same year as his mother. He joined the BYU faculty in 1962. He received a Ph.D. from U.C.L.A in 1962.

Ballif was the founding dean of the BYU College of Physical and Mathematical Sciences, formed in Fall of 1972.

Ballif was the author of Conceptual Physics along with William E. Dibble.

Ballif is a member of the Church of Jesus Christ of Latter-day Saints, where he served as a bishop, stake president and stake patriarch. He also wrote In Search of Truth and Love. From 1977 to 1979, he served as president of the Massachusetts Boston Mission. He later served as a sealer in the Provo Utah Temple.

Ballif contributed the article on the "Restoration of the Melchizedek Priesthood" to the Encyclopedia of Mormonism.

Ballif was provost of BYU from 1979 to 1989, after which he returned to being a member of the school's physics faculty.
