= Peter Johnsen =

Peter Berghsey Johnsen (born 1950) is an American scientist, administrator and adventurer.

== Education ==
Johnsen received his bachelor's (1974) and Ph.D. (1978) degrees from the University of Wisconsin–Madison in zoology and continued his training as a postdoctoral fellow at the University of Pennsylvania in neurobiology. He later completed an organizational leadership program at Harvard Kennedy School.

== Career ==
Johnsen joined the Monell Chemical Senses Center in 1980 and taught in the Department of Biology and College of Veterinary Medicine at the University of Pennsylvania. His principle field of research was in the area of animal sensory physiology working with fish including salmon and sharks, alligators and birds. He has published over 75 research papers, contributed to numerous technical books, received two patents and has been an invited speaker nationally and internationally.

In 1986 Johnsen joined the USDA Agricultural Research Service at the Southern Regional Research Center in New Orleans as Research Leader of the Food Flavor Quality program combining sensory evaluation and analytical chemistry. He also served on the graduate faculty of Louisiana State University in the Department of Zoology and Physiology.

Johnsen became a member of the Senior Executive Service in 1994 and was named Director of the USDA National Center for Agricultural Utilization Research in Peoria, Illinois. He led an R&D enterprise with 100 Ph.D. scientists and 170 technical support personnel in research on materials science, bioprocessing, and genetic engineering that utilized agricultural commodities for industrial and consumer products. He provided leadership for the funding, design and construction of a $20 million R&D facility containing biotechnology and chemical processing pilot plants. He testified before Congressional committees to obtain legislation to authorize use of USDA pilot plants as business incubators for research and product development.

Johnsen was a founding director and chairman of Peoria NEXT, an organization created in 2001 dedicated to technology-based economic development. Accomplishments include creation of angel and venture funds which supported many start-up companies, building a $13 million technology incubator facility and $13 million cancer research center as well as establishing a math and science charter school.

In 2006 Johnsen became provost and vice president for academic affairs at Bradley University, a private university of 5000 undergraduates and 1000 graduate students. He was instrumental in creating the Institute for Principled Leadership in Public Service, the sports communication program and returning ROTC to the campus.

In 2013 Johnsen was named president and CEO of the PRB Foundation, which supports innovation in healthcare and community well-being by providing grants to academic and clinical research organizations. As chairman of Methodist Health Services Cooperation in 2014, he led the affiliation process with Proctor Hospital creating an integrated two hospital and large physician clinic system serving patients in central Illinois. In 2019 Johnsen co-founded a behavioral health company by merging three organizations to provide comprehensive mental health services across eight central Illinois counties served by 500 professionals. As chairman of the board he led the construction of a dedicated child and adolescent facility providing in-patient and out-patient services. An entrepreneur, Johnsen established a technology consulting company and co-founded a Ag-biotech company to commercialize Pennycress as a renewable fuels feedstock.

== Personal life ==
Johnsen was an avid mountaineer climbing in North and South America, Europe, Nepal, and New Zealand. He reached the highest point of the 50 United States, including Alaska's Denali via the West Rib route. As a motorcyclist he has completed the Ultimate Coast to Coast ride recognized by the Iron Butt Association for a round trip ride from Deadhorse, Alaska on the Arctic Ocean to Key West, Florida. He completed a ride on the oldest available alignments of historic Route 66 from Chicago to Los Angeles for BMW Motorcycle Magazine and has toured in Europe and Africa.

== Awards and honors ==
Johnsen's honors include being elected Fellow of The Explorers Club in 1982, elected to the Royal Swedish Academy of Agriculture and Forestry in 2000, received Silver Beaver Award from the Boy Scouts of America in 2002, elected to the Royal Swedish Academy of Engineering Sciences in 2003 and named Laboratory Director of the Year by the Federal Laboratory Consortium in 2004.
