= Thomas D. Allen =

Thomas D. Allen served as the Secretary of the United States Fund for International Scouting (USFIS) within the National Boy Scouts of America Foundation, and as a member of the International Committee and the National Executive Board of the BSA, as well as a member of the World Scout Programme Committee. He was also appointed to the National Committee involved in putting out the 1979 Scout Handbook after the attempt at rebranding scouting in the 1970s, which he described as "a disaster." He served as the Scoutmaster of Troop #10 of the Pathway to Adventure Council in Illinois from October 1953 to the Summer of 1973, and was an Assistant Scoutmaster both before and after.

In 1992, Allen was awarded the 220th Bronze Wolf, the only distinction of the World Organization of the Scout Movement, awarded by the World Scout Committee for exceptional services to world Scouting. He was one of only six men to hold all four top-tier Scouting awards, the Bronze Wolf, the Silver Buffalo, the Silver Antelope, and the Distinguished Eagle Scout Award from NESA. He joined NESA as soon as he received the application in the 70s.
