= BYU College of Physical and Mathematical Sciences =

Division of Brigham Young University

Coordinates: 40°14′50″N 111°39′01″W

The BYU College of Computational, Mathematical, and Physical Sciences was first organized in 1949 the College of Physical and Engineering Sciences. Engineering was later separated off and merged with the College of Industrial and Technical Education to form the College of Engineering and Technology. The founding dean of the newly formed College of Physical and Mathematical Science in 1972 was Jae R. Ballif. In 2024, as part of the 50th celebration of the college, it was rebranded to the name we know today: the College of Computational, Mathematical, and Physical Sciences. The name change celebrates the huge significance of not only the computer science department, but also how computing has changed each of the departments. The dean during this name change in 2024 was Grant Jensen.

The Brigham Young University College of Physical and Mathematical Sciences consists of seven departments.

- Chemistry and Biochemistry
- Computer Science
- Geological Science
- Mathematics
- Mathematics Education
- Physics and Astronomy
- Statistics

The department of physics and astronomy offers a broad array of classes in both these subjects. It operates the BYU planetarium and the various telescopes connected with BYU's observatory. Besides astronomy the department has research groups in Acoustics; Atomic, Molecular and Optical studies; Condensed Matter; Plasma; and Theoretical and Mathematical physics. The program also works closely with the David O. McKay College of Education to train physics teachers primarily to teach in high schools. The college also supervises the BYU Center for Animation.

== BYU Photo Studio ==
The BYU Photo Studio began as part of the Physics Department. This was largely because it was founded by Wayne B. Hales, a former BYU physics professor who began photography instruction at BYU. It originally primarily served the needs of the Banyan, BYU's Yearbook. From 1969 to 1985, the Photo Studio was directed by George Lee Hampton II.
