= James Smoot Coleman =

- Born: February 4, 1919; Provo, Utah
- Died: April 20, 1985 (aged 66); Los Angeles

Education
- Education: Harvard University; Brigham Young University

Philosophical work
- Institutions: University of California at Los Angeles; University of Dar es Salaam; University of Nairobi; Makerere University College
- Main interests: African studies

James Smoot Coleman (4 February 1919 – 20 April 1985) was an American scholar, professor and administrator in political science, but more specifically in African studies. He is noted for two of his books, Nigeria: Background to Nationalism and Education and Political Development which have been called "classics of scholarship".

== Biography ==
Coleman was born in Provo, Utah, to a Mormon family, son of Jacob Coleman and Allie Smoot Coleman. He graduated from Brigham Young High School in 1936. He enrolled in Brigham Young University, but interrupted his college education to join the U.S. Army in 1941, and achieved the rank of Lt. Colonel before resigning in 1946 after the end of World War II. Coleman received his bachelor's degree from Brigham Young University in 1947 and his master's (1948). He received a doctorate in (1953) from Harvard University. He was a teaching fellow at Harvard from 1949 to 1950, and again in 1953. In 1953, he became an instructor at the University of California at Los Angeles (UCLA), and soon was appointed as an assistant professor. In 1963 he was president of the African Studies Association.

Coleman was the first director of the UCLA African Studies Center from its founding in 1959 until 1965. From 1965 to 1978, Coleman spent over twelve years as a university administrator in Africa. First in 1965 he was Head of the Department of Political Science and Public Administration at Makerere University College at the University of East Africa in Uganda. In 1967 he moved to Kenya to assume the position as Director for the Institute for Development Studies at the University of Nairobi. Finally he went to the University of Dar es Salaam in Tanzania. From 1967 to 1978, while in Africa, Coleman was an associate director of the Rockefeller Foundation and served as its representative for East Africa and Zaire.

Coleman returned to UCLA in 1978 as a full professor in political science and as chair of the UCLA Council on International and Comparative Studies (CICS). As head of CICS he was instrumental in leading the Southern California Consortium for International Studies from 1978 until his death in 1985. In 1984 he became the first director of UCLA's International Studies and Overseas Programs (ISOP) (now known as UCLA's International Institute).

Coleman married Margaret Tate on 4 February 1944, and they had two sons. On 20 June 1965, Coleman married Ursula Finken. Coleman died suddenly of a heart attack in Los Angeles on 20 April 1985.

== Awards and honors ==
- 1959 Woodrow Wilson Foundation Award for Nigeria: Background to Nationalism
- Decorated Most Excellent Order of the British Empire (MBE) Honorary Member
- 1966 Fellow of the American Academy of Arts and Sciences
- 1985 the African Studies Center at UCLA was renamed the James S. Coleman African Studies Center in his honor.

== Sources ==
- Bowman, John Stewart (ed.) (1995) "James Smoot Coleman – 1919–1985" The Cambridge Dictionary of American Biography Cambridge University Press, Cambridge, England, ISBN 0-521-40258-1
- Gale Reference Team (1967) Contemporary Authors: A bio-bibliographical guide to current writers in fiction, general nonfiction, poetry, journalism, drama, motion pictures, television, and other fields Volumes 1-4 (1st revision) Gale Research, Detroit
- Stren, Richard (1985) "In Memoriam: James Smoot Coleman, 1919–1985" Canadian Journal of African Studies 19(2): p. 292
- Lofchie, Michael (1986) "James Smoot Coleman, 1919–85: An Appreciation" Africa: Journal of the International African Institute 56(1): pp. 82–84
