= Bagel Bites =

Brand of frozen pizza snacks

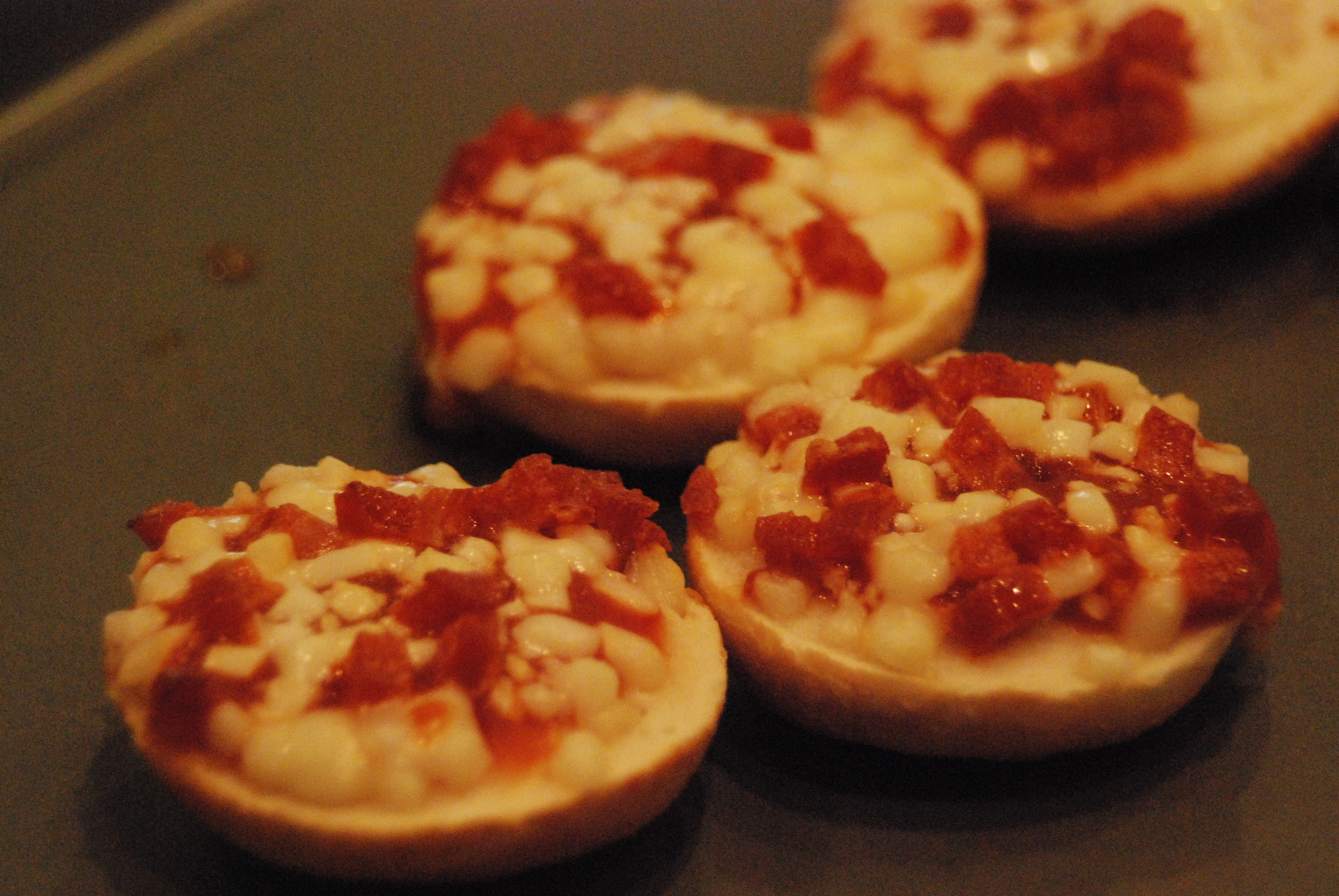
- Pepperoni Bagel Bites
- Product type: Pizza bagel
- Current owner: Kraft Heinz
- Country: U.S.
- Markets: Worldwide
- Previous owners: Heinz
- Website: bagelbites.com

Bagel Bites are a brand of frozen pizza bagel snacks produced by Kraft Heinz.

== History ==
Bagel Bites were invented by Bob Mosher and Stanley Garczynski, both of Fort Myers, Florida, who then sold the company to major food producer John Labatt Co. Later a large portion of Labatt Co. was purchased by Heinz in 1991 in a $500 million deal. In the early 2000s, Bagel Bites shifted its marketing focus to tween boys, a strategy anchored by a partnership with skateboarding legend Tony Hawk that resulted in a 32% increase in consumption.

The mini-bagels are topped with cheese and other pizza toppings. Bagel Bites are available in six flavors: Cheese & Pepperoni; Three Cheese; Cheese, Sausage & Pepperoni; Mozzarella Cheese; Supreme; Cheesy Garlic Bread; and Extreme Nacho. Bagel Bites come in 9, 18, 24, 36, 40, and 72 count varieties, and are manufactured in Southwest Florida.

Bagel Bites also makes Breakfast Bagel Bites, which consist of breakfast toppings on the mini-bagel. These are available in Bacon & Cheese, Bacon Egg & Cheese, Bacon Sausage & Cheese and Sausage Egg & Cheese. Preparation of Bagel Bites involves either a microwave or an oven.

== Popular culture ==
In the 1990s, Bagel Bites ran a television commercial, most popular during children's programming, featuring the jingle:

Pizza in the morning,
Pizza in the evenin',
Pizza at suppertime!
When pizza's on a bagel,
You can eat pizza anytime!

— Bagel Bites' 1990s commercial

The lyrics were altered from The McGuire Sisters' 1957 single "Sugartime", written by Charlie "Sugartime" Phillips.

In 2002, an ad was aired featuring pro skateboarder Tony Hawk.

The jingle was performed on a web exclusive video for Late Night With Jimmy Fallon, in which he and Meat Loaf do a rock operatic style extended remake of the jingle (with additional lyrics), titled "Ode to Bagel Bites".

In the television show Superstore (TV series) episode "Cloud 9.0," several characters sing the jingle while holding a candlelight vigil.

In the television show Brooklyn Nine-Nine episode "Halloween IV," NYPD detective Amy Santiago criticizes fellow detective Jake Peralta for eating pizza for breakfast, to which Jake replies "When pizza's on a bagel, you can have pizza anytime!"

In the second season of Ted, Ted and John criticize the jingle for trying to distinguish evening and supper time as two different times of the day.

== See also ==
- List of frozen food brands
