= Tater tots =

Deep-fried grated potato cylinders

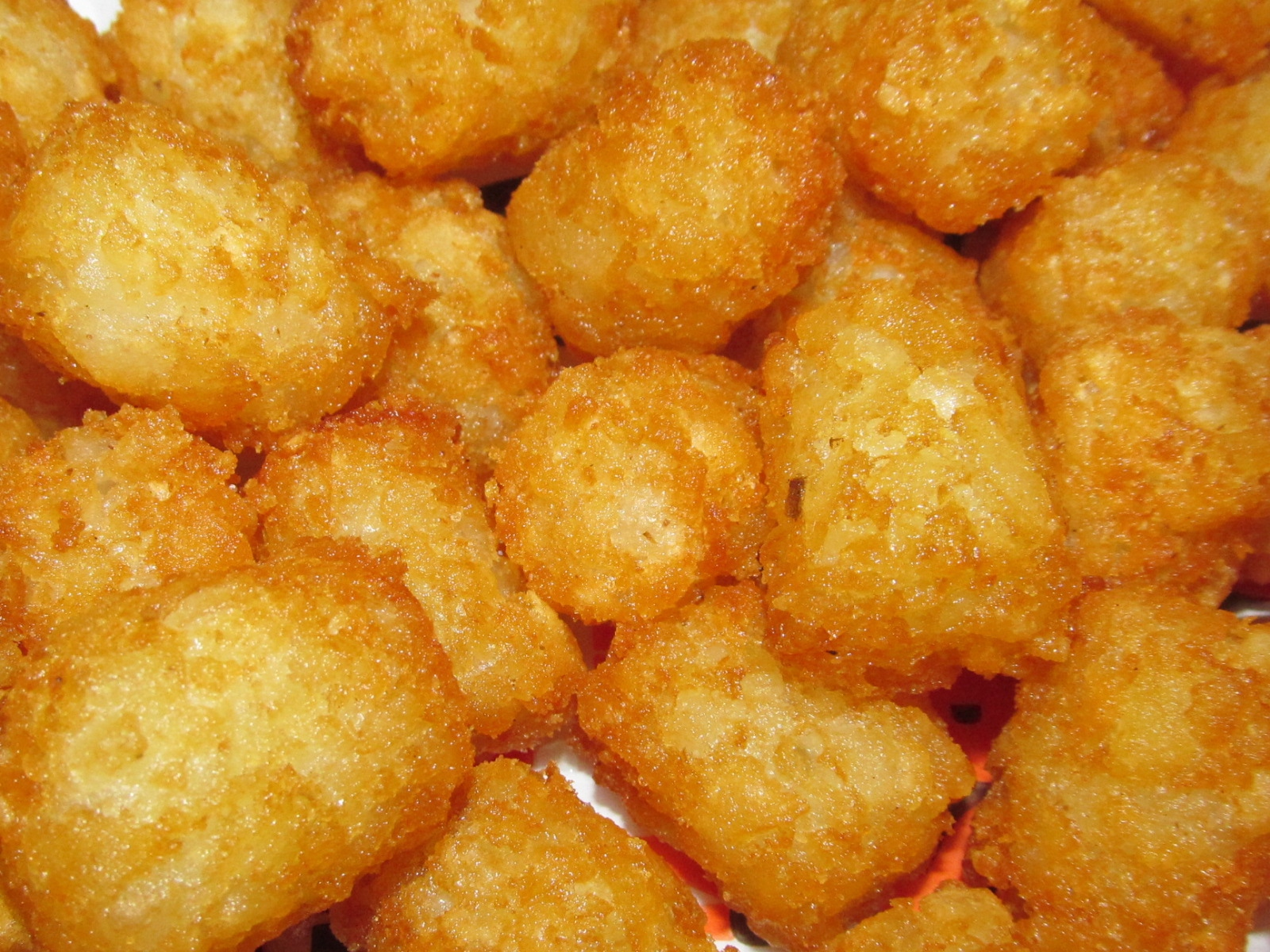
- Course: Entrée or side dish, sometimes as part of a main course
- Place of origin: United States
- Region or state: Ontario, Oregon
- Created by: F. Nephi Grigg, and Golden Grigg (in 1953)
- Main ingredients: Potato
- Variations: Veggie tots
- Food energy (per serving): (serving size: 86 g) 160

Tater tots are grated potato formed into small cylinders and deep-fried, often served as a side dish. "Tater" is a dialect form of the word potato. The name "tater tot" is a registered trademark of the American frozen food company Ore-Ida, but is often used as a generic term. Ore-Ida also markets a coin-shaped version called "Crispy Crowns".

== History ==
Tater tots were developed in 1953 when American frozen food company Ore-Ida founders F. Nephi Grigg, Golden Grigg, and Ross Erin Butler Sr. were trying to devise a recipe to use leftover slivers of cut potatoes that would otherwise be thrown away. They chopped up the slivers, added flour and seasoning, then pushed the mash through holes and sliced off pieces of the extruded mixture.

The product was first offered commercially in stores in 1956. Originally, sales were slow; the family speculated the product was priced too low, so it had no perceived value. When the price was raised, people began buying it. By 1960 Ore-Ida captured 25% of the frozen potato market.

The name "Tater Tot" is a registered trademark of Ore-Ida—which has been a subsidiary of Heinz (now part of Kraft Heinz) since 1965—but has become so widely associated with the dish that it is often used as a generic term. "Tater" is short for potato. The name "Tater Tot" was created in the 1950s, and soon trademarked by a member of the Ore-Ida company's research committee who used a thesaurus to come up with an alliterative name.

Today, Americans consume approximately 70 million pounds (32,000 t) of Tater Tots, or 3,710,000,000 Tots per year.

Since at least 2016, vegetable companies (like the Green Giant brand) have introduced "veggie tots" which seek to substitute more nutritionally dense vegetables (e.g., broccoli and cauliflower) for the potato.

== Usage ==
=== Asia ===
Tater tots, locally known as mat-gamja (Korean: 맛감자), are a common bunsik item in Korea. They are often served in a paper cup, with drizzled sweet gochujang-based sauce.

=== Europe ===
In the United Kingdom, Ross Frozen Foods once produced "Oven Crunchies", although generic versions remain widely available. McCain Foods currently produce "Hash Brown Potato Bites" that are similar to classic tater tots. Birds Eye also have "Hash Brown Potato Bites" in their "Chicken Shop" range.

=== North America ===
In Canada, McCain Foods Limited calls its line "Tasti Taters".

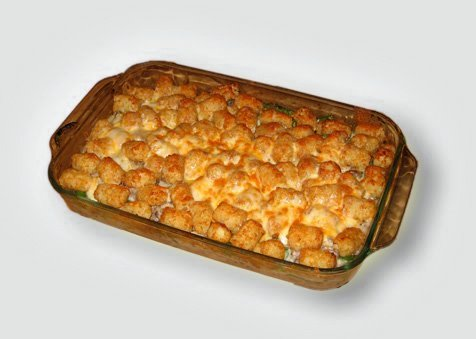
In the Great Lakes region of the Midwest states, tater tot hotdish is a popular soup-based casserole consisting of tater tots, ground beef and various vegetables.

In Canada and the United States, tater tots are common at school-lunch counters and cafeterias. They are also sold in the frozen food sections of grocery stores. Some fast-food restaurants also offer them.

Supermarket chain Safeway sells a generic brand of tater tots known as "Tater Treats". Cascadian Farm calls its line "Spud Puppies". Sonic drive-in also features tater tots on their regular menu: available toppings include cheese and chili. Sonic also sells "Cheesy Tots", coin-shaped tots that contain melted cheese and potatoes. Several restaurants in the American Pacific Northwest offer a nacho version of tots known as "totchos", covered in nacho cheese sauce and toppings. Totchos were invented by publican Jim Parker in Portland, Oregon.

Some Mexican-style fast-food restaurants offer seasoned tater tots: Taco Time and Señor Frog's call them "Mexi-Fries", while Taco Bell used to sell them as "Mexi-Nuggets" and "Border Fries". Taco Mayo in the Southwest offers round disc-shaped tater tots called "Potato Locos". Taco John's also has coin shaped tots called "Potato Olés".

Food franchises Potato Corner and Papa John's also offer tater tots in select locations, though in the latter case these are branded as "Potato Tots".

=== Oceania ===
In New Zealand, they are known as "potato pom-poms". In Australia, they are known as "potato gems" or "potato royals".

== See also ==
- Croquette – Small breaded, deep-fried food
- Dumpling - piece of cooked dough made from a starchy source, often wrapped around a filling
- French fries – Deep-fried strips of potato
- Hash browns – Fried potato dish
- Hotdish – Casserole from the American Upper Midwest
- List of deep fried foods
- List of frozen food brands
- Potato cake – Various cake-shaped potato dishes
- Potato pancake – Shallow-fried pancakes of grated or ground potato
- Potato processing industry
- Potato salad - a salad dish made from boiled potatoes
