= Scout troop =

Basic organizational unit of Scouting

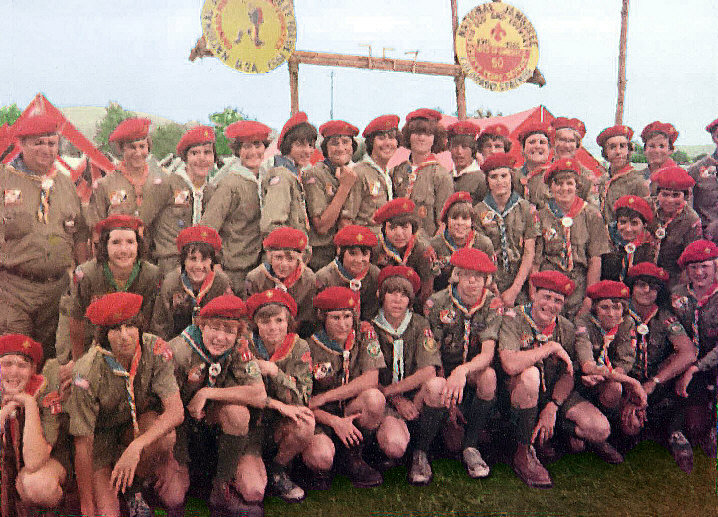
- A Boy Scouts of America troop at a national Scout jamboree in 1977.
- Country: Worldwide
- Founded: 1907
- Founder: Robert Baden-Powell, 1st Baron Baden-Powell

A Scout troop is a term adopted into use with Boy Scouts, Girl Scouts and the Scout Movement to describe their basic units. The term troop echoes a group of mounted scouts in the military or an expedition and follows the terms cavalry, mounted infantry and mounted police use for organizational units.

== Boy Scouts, Girl Scouts and Scout Movement ==
In the Scout Movement, a Scout troop is an organizational unit consisting of a number of patrols of Scouts, Boy Scouts, Girl Scouts or Girl Guides. Girl Guides often use the terms unit instead of patrol and company instead of troop. The initial organization unit in the Scout Movement was a patrol of about 6 to 8 Scouts. Where there were a number of patrols, they could form a Scout troop. Scout troops are composed of boys and/or girls usually aged 10 to 18 years. Some Scout organizations have senior Scout patrols within Scout troops or senior Scout troops for the older youths. The size of a Scouts BSA troop for example, can vary from as few as five Scouts to over 100 youth, although the average is often said to be around 14. Scout troops may meet regularly at a meeting place. In addition, some Scout troops are active in the organization of additional activities.

In some Scout organizations a Scout troop can be part of a Scout Group that combines the Scout troop with programs for different age groups such as Beavers, Cubs, Explorers or Venturers and Rovers, while in other Scout organizations the different age groups are independent of each other even though they may be sponsored or chartered by the same community organization, such as a business, service organization, school, labor group veteran's group, or religious institution.

== Leadership ==
A key component of the Scouting movement is that Scout troops are led by the Scouts themselves under the advice and guidance of adult leaders. Scout Troops operate on the patrol method. Each Scout patrol is led by a Scout called the Patrol Leader. The Patrol Leaders within a Scout Troop form a Court of Honor, 'Troop Council', or Patrol Leader Council under the guidance of the adult leader of the Scout Troop. Some Scout Organizations allow a Scout to be appointed as a Senior Patrol Leader or Troop Leader who leads the Scout troop and Court of Honor. The Court of Honor is responsible for the management, program and activities of the troop. The leadership role of the adult and Scout members of the Court of Honor vary, and in some troops it is the norm for the adult leader to play a mentorship role, teaching the youth responsibility in their own leadership roles.

== See also ==
- Cub Pack
