= Pizza bagel =

Bagel with pizza toppings

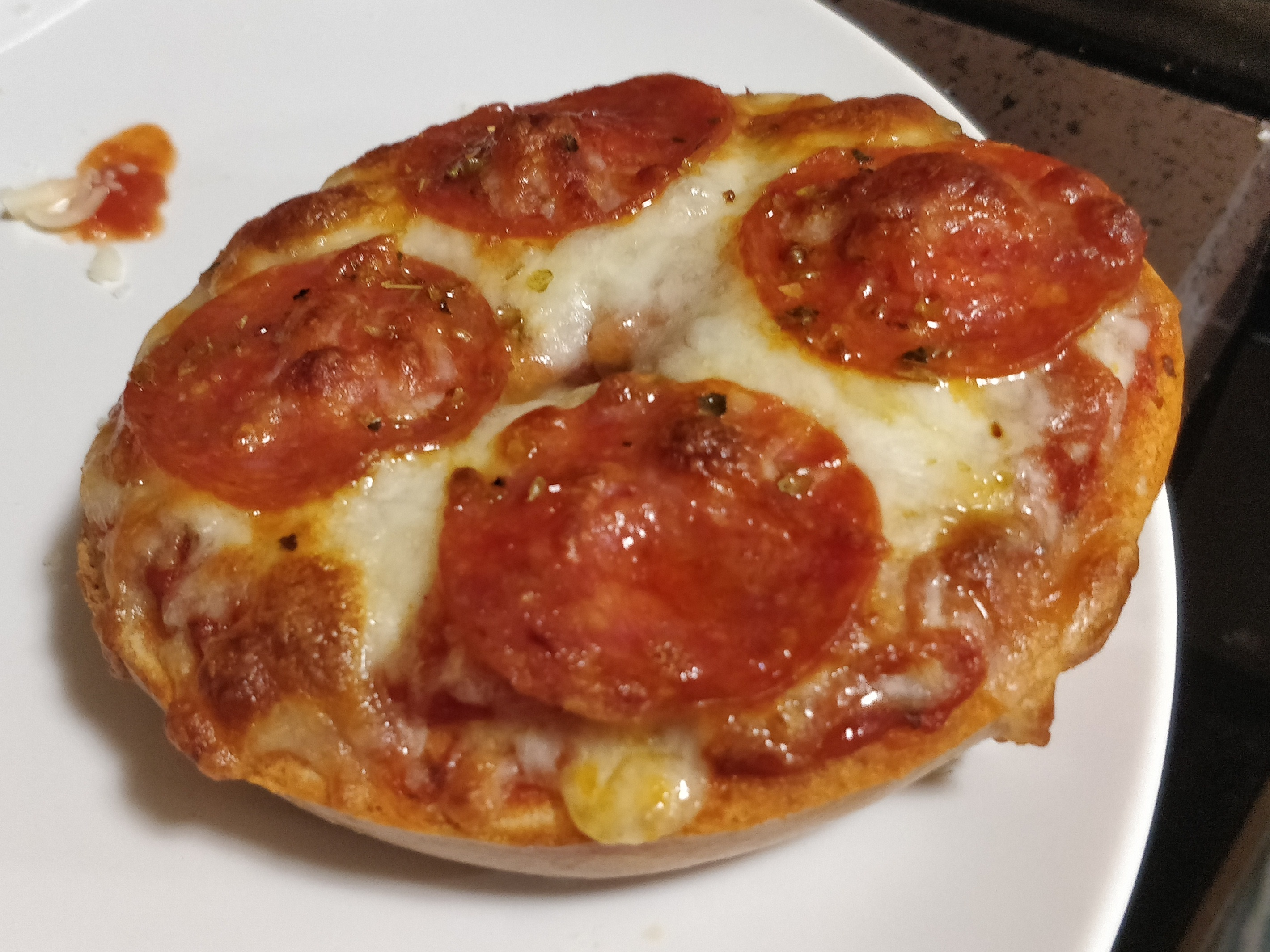
- Pizza bagel with pepperoni
- Type: Bagel
- Course: Lunch
- Place of origin: United States
- Region or state: Cleveland, Ohio
- Main ingredients: Bagel, tomato sauce, cheese
- Variations: Other additional toppings

A pizza bagel is a bagel with pizza toppings.

== History ==
The earliest known mention of a "Pizza Bagel" appeared in February 1952, when the Miami News credited Arthur Adler with creating the dish at the Allison Hotel's Buttery in Miami Beach, Florida. Anthony DeMauro invented the pizza bagel in 1957 at Amster's Bagel Bakery (now closed) in South Euclid, a suburb of Cleveland, Ohio. It was not until May 26, 1970, when Amster Pizza Bagel, Inc. submitted registration for Pizza Bagels to the US Copyright Office. On October 1, 1970, Amster Pizza Bagel, Inc. registered for a product that contains 6 frozen pizza bagels in folding cartons with a net weight of 11 ounces (310 g).

In 1974, at a Western Bagel in Woodland Hills, Los Angeles, 17-year-old store clerk Bruce Treitman began offering a flattened bagel with marinara sauce and mozzarella cheese.

In early 2014, Katz Bagel Bakery in Chelsea, Massachusetts, claimed that Harry Katz invented a variation of this pizza bagel in 1970. Unlike traditional pizza bagels, Katz's version is similar to a miniature pizza. Katz uses bagel dough without the hole, topped with cheese and tomato sauce.

== Commercial distribution ==
The Bagel Bites brand was inspired by the pizza bagel. Bagel Bites are a miniature, frozen version of the pizza bagel sold in commercial grocery stores.

== Other uses ==
The term "pizza bagel" also means a person of Italian and Jewish descent. This is likely because pizza is a dish of Italian origin, and bagels are of Ashkenazi Jewish origin.

== See also ==
- Bagel and cream cheese
- Bialy (bread)
- List of bread dishes
