= R. Lanier Britsch =

American historian

Ralph Lanier Britsch (born 1938) was a history professor at Brigham Young University who specialized in the history of missionary work by the Church of Jesus Christ of Latter-day Saints (LDS Church), particularly in the Pacific Islands and Asia.

== Biography ==
Britsch is the son of Ralph A. Britsch, who was a BYU English professor and helped start the Humanities program at Brigham Young University.

Britsch served as a missionary for the LDS Church in Hawaii two times, first as a youth, and later as a senior missionary assigned to help document the history of the Polynesian Cultural Center. Britsch received his bachelor's degree and master's degree from BYU, and his Ph.D. from Claremont Graduate University in 1968.

Among the books Britsch has written or edited are Nothing More Heroic: The Compelling Story of the First Latter-day Saint missionaries in India; From the East: The History of the Latter-day Saints in Asia, 1851-1996; Moramona: The Mormons in Hawai'i and Unto the Islands of the Sea: A History of the Latter-day Saints in the Pacific. Britsch also wrote Counseling: A Guide to Helping Others.

For a time, Britsch was the director of BYU's David M. Kennedy Center for International Studies. Britsch was also Vice President for Academics at Brigham Young University Hawaii between 1986 and 1990.

He and his previous wife JoAnn Murphy Britsch are the parents of six children; JoAnn died in 2005. Britsch has since married Shirley McKay in 2007.

Britsch's older brother Todd Britsch was a humanities professor and later Academic Vice President at BYU.

Britsch has served in many positions in the LDS Church, including numerous assignments in bishoprics of BYU student wards and in the leadership of BYU student stakes. He also served in the presidency of the Orem Utah Sharon Stake. He is currently a patriarch in Orem, Utah.
