= Richard A. Compton =

American politician (1926–1992)

Richard Arnold Compton
- Born: July 9, 1926; Ithaca, New York
- Died: December 19, 1992; Tompkins, New York
- Spouse: Eunice Morris
- Parent(s): Roy and Herminia (Barina) Compton

Academic background
- Education: Cornell University

Richard Arnold Compton (July 9, 1926 – December 19, 1992) of Ithaca, New York was an American educator, hotelman and expert in the facilities management within resort and entertainment industry. Trained as an engineer and not as a hospitality service provider, Compton was among the first to organize the emerging study of hotel management along the same rigorous research criteria applied to other academic disciplines.

== Expertise ==
Taking his engineering Bachelor of Science in mechanical engineering at Cornell University in 1948, Richard “Dick” Compton served as a Professor of Hotel Administration at Cornell University's School of Hotel Management. Significant in Compton's trend of more extensive research into the practices of the hospitality industry were two of his works, Wall Surfaces: A Research Report on Minimum Requirements (1965) and Carpets Woven of Wool and Stainless Steel (1967). In the late 1960s, Compton's professionalization of hotel management research led to support for the application of new technologies to internal management controls of the hospitality sector of the economy.

National Security

A veteran of the United States Army, Compton served on the Cornell Faculty team executing U.S. Department of Defense Contract No. OCD-OS-69-42 in the late 1950s. The contract funded research into optimum food service procedures for fallout shelters; the purposes, responsibilities, policies and operations of the person selected to manage these services under the overall supervision of the shelter manager; and workable solutions to the many problems that could arise and to suggest and to explain minimum equipment needed to support sheltered American in the aftermath of a thermonuclear exchange between the United States and the Soviet Union. The report concluded, “unless the nuclear disaster is so devastating and bewildering that the population is incapable of its usual adaptive behavior and willingness to cooperate, in our opinion, competent water and food management should be able to guide most of the people through a shelter experience.” In subsequent projects, the team proposed training regimes in licensed fall out shelters to achieve the “preservation and development of the basic social objectives . . .” of American culture and that “[c]omplaining occupants need to be reminded frequently that all men can endure much more than they think they can, if they will have the will to do it, especially for the common good.”

== Early life and family ==
During the Second World War, Professor Compton served in the U.S. Naval Reserve, Officer Training Corps assigned to the Pacific theatre of operations. After the war, he operated a business, Roy W. Compton & Son, with his father. They were general building contractors. And early proponent of commercial flight, Compton was Vice President of the Finger Lakes Flying Service, Inc. at the same time he was a lecturer in the Cornell Hotel School and, eventually, assistant director of the school's Department of Research. He served as County Supervisor, Tompkins County, representing the Seventh Ward of the City of Ithaca for two terms in the 1960s. Compton was spouse to Eunice Ann Compton, and they had five children; Carol (b. 1948); Richard A. Jr. (1950); William (1956); and James “Chip" Alfred (b. 1960); Stephen A. Compton (b. 1963)

== Sample publications ==
- Richard A. Compton, "Carpets Woven of Wool and Stainless Steel," 7 Cornell Hotel and Restaurant Administration Quarterly 117-120 (Apr. 1967);
- Richard A. Compton, "Wall Surfaces: A Research Report on Minimum Requirements," 5 Cornell Hotel and Restaurant Administration Quarterly 27-40 (Feb. 1965);
- Ruth Rossman & Richard A. Compton, "Reviews," 6 Cornell Hotel and Restaurant Administration Quarterly 102-104 (Nov. 1965);
- The School of Hotel Administration, Cornell University, A Guide for the Training of Food Managers of Licensed Fall Out Shelters (Apr. 30, 1963)(junior research staff, academic);
- The School of Hotel Administration, Cornell University, Food Service Procedures in Fall Out Shelters (Apr. 30, 1960)(junior research staff, academic).

== Honors ==
- Richard A. Compton Scholarship, established August 1, 1994 by Roger G. Hill II '87 and William A. Compton, to provide undergraduate scholarship support for students enrolled in Cornell University's School of Hotel Administration.
