= Todd Britsch =

American academic (1937–2025)

Dr. Todd Britsch
- Born: September 23, 1937; Provo, Utah, U.S.
- Died: April 21, 2022 (aged 84)
- Education: Florida State University; Brigham Young University
- Occupation: Academic administrator
- Spouse: Dorothy Crofts

Todd A. Britsch (September 23, 1937 – April 21, 2022) was an American emeritus professor of humanities and a former academic vice president at Brigham Young University (BYU).

== Biography ==
Britsch was born in 1937, the year before his father Ralph Britsch joined the faculty at BYU in Provo, Utah. After serving a mission for the Church of Jesus Christ of Latter-day Saints (LDS Church) in Switzerland and Austria, Todd Britsch graduated from BYU in 1962.

While at BYU, Britsch met his wife, Dorothy Crofts, and they are the parents of two children. They were married in the Bern Switzerland Temple. Dorothy Britsch died in 2003.

After undergraduate work, Britsch did a Ph.D. in General Humanities at Florida State University. Via ambition and labor, this did not take long; only four years after leaving as an undergraduate, Britsch was back as a member of the faculty at BYU in 1966.

By the mid-1970s he was Director of the Department of Humanities within the College of Humanities where he taught the historical and artistic features of the Western Tradition from ancient Greece down to the 20th-century. His personal-professional style was characterized by discipline, clear insight, dry humor, and a flexible approach to problem-solving. His father held a faculty teaching position under him. During his time as Director a course in Asian humanities was added to broaden offerings beyond traditional western culture studies. Britsch served in an ecclesiastical leadership role as Branch President for missionaries studying Korean and Navajo at the Provo, Utah Missionary Training Center of the Church of Jesus Christ of Latter-day Saints in the early 1980s.

From 1992 to 1996 Britsch served as BYU's academic vice president.

A poem by Britsch was published in the Ensign.

Britsch died on April 21, 2022, at the age of 84.
