= Silver Antelope Award =

Territory-level service award of Scouting America

- Silver Antelope medal and square knot
- Owner: Scouting America
- Country: United States
- Created: 1942
- Awarded for: Distinguished service to youth in a territory
- Recipients: 3,360
Previous; Silver Beaver Award	Next; Silver Buffalo Award

The Silver Antelope Award is a distinguished service award presented by Scouting America for outstanding service to young people within one of the organization’s divisions. Since 2022 award has been presented for service to a Council Service Territory.

Recipients of this award are registered Scouters of exceptional character in their territory and this award recognizes their distinguished service to youth. The award is approved and issued by the National Court of Honor.

== Award ==
The award consists of a silver antelope suspended from a white and orange ribbon worn around the neck. Recipients may wear the corresponding square knot, with a white strand over an orange strand, on the Scouting America uniform.

== History ==
The award was created in 1942 and first issued in 1943. An orange-white-orange ribbon bar was used for informal uniform wear until 1946, when ribbon bars were replaced by the current square knot insignia. Using the United States Military as the model, silver awards are the highest awards in Scouting America.

From 1942 to 2021, the Silver Antelope recognized service within one of the geographical regions of Scouting America. Beginning in 2022, after the administrative reorganization of Scouting America, it is presented for service in a Council Service Territory.

From the first awards in 1943 through 2025, there have been only 3,360 recipients of the Silver Antelope. Famous recipients include General William C. Westmoreland (1969), Ernie Banks (1969), Philip M. Condit, CEO of Boeing (2007), Ross Perot (1974), Admiral Arleigh Burke (1964), Sanford McDonnell, CEO of McDonnell Douglas (1983), and several state governors.

== See also ==
- List of recipients of the Silver Antelope Award
