= John P. Scripps =

American newspaper publisher and horse breeder (1912–1989)

- Born: John Paul Scripps; October 5, 1912; Cleveland, Ohio, U.S.
- Died: March 16, 1989 (aged 76); La Jolla, California, U.S.
- Education: University of Southern California
- Occupations: Newspaper publisher; businessman; horse breeder
- Known for: Founder and publisher of John P. Scripps Newspapers
- Family: E. W. Scripps (paternal grandfather); Milton A. McRae (maternal grandfather)

John P. Scripps (October 5, 1912 – March 15, 1989) was an American newspaper publisher, businessman, and horse breeder. He established John P. Scripps Newspapers, a newspaper group that owned and operated newspapers in California. He also owned Ivanhoe Ranch in San Diego County, California, where he bred and raised horses.

== Early life and education ==
John Paul Scripps was born in Cleveland, Ohio, on October 5, 1912. He was the son of John Paul Holtsinger Scripps and Edith McRae. He was part of the Scripps family, which had immigrated to the United States earlier, when his great-grandfather James Mogg Scripps arrived from England in 1844. The family developed a newspaper-publishing business in the United States. His grandfather, E. W. Scripps, founded the Cleveland Press. His grandfather later established the Scripps-McRae League, while his mother's father Milton A. McRae served as its general manager.

His father served as editor-in-chief of the Scripps-McRae League before dying of heart failure in 1914. His mother contracted pneumonia while working as a volunteer nurse and died from the illness on December 2, 1918. After becoming an orphan at six, he spent much of his life in San Diego County, California. His grandfathers, E. W. Scripps and M. A. McRae, played a significant role in his upbringing. Following the death of Scripps's mother, a dispute arose over his guardianship. M. A. McRae was granted custody, after which the partnership between the Scripps and McRae families ended. E. W. Scripps subsequently established the Scripps-Howard newspaper chain. His paternal grandfather, E. W. Scripps, died in 1926.

At age 16, Scripps made his first investment in the newspaper business by purchasing an interest in the Ventura County Star in 1928. M. A. McRae advised him in the venture.

Scripps attended the University of Southern California to study journalism.

== Newspaper publishing ==
When his maternal grandfather, Milton A. McRae, passed away in 1930, he began managing his company John P. Scripps Newspapers full-time.

In June 1940, Scripps acquired a controlling interest in the San Luis Obispo Telegram-Tribune. At the time, he was already the publisher of four other California daily newspapers. The newspaper had previously been part of the Scripps league controlled by his cousins E. W. Scripps and J. G. Scripps. He also acquired an interest in the Bremerton Sun in Washington from his cousins.

He joined his cousins Charles, Ted, and Robert Scripps in 1986 to merge John P. Scripps Newspapers with Scripps Howard. He continued working in the newspaper business, serving as chairman of John P. Scripps Newspapers and a director of Scripps Howard. At the time of his death, Scripps's company had grown from one small daily newspaper into a group of seven daily and two weekly newspapers.

== Horse breeding ==
Scripps was also involved in horse breeding and ranching. He purchased Ivanhoe Ranch in Jamacha, San Diego. He maintained a stock farm and stable at his Ivanhoe property, where he bred, showed, and raced horses. Scripps described his horse breeding activities as a business, while horse shows and harness racing were primarily recreational pursuits. He purchased Belle Mac for $470 at a sale in Indianapolis in the fall of 1934 after instructing his stable manager to select a racehorse for his show stable.

He served as a director of the Hambletonian Society from 1936 to 1943. In 1937, Scripps was elected a steward of the Trotting Horse Club of America at its annual meeting in New York.

== Death ==
Scripps died on March 16, 1989, in La Jolla, California, at the age of 76. He passed away from heart failure at the Scripps Clinic.

== See also ==
- John P. Scripps Newspaper Group
