= A Boy and His Dog (disambiguation) =

A Boy and His Dog is a cycle of narratives by Harlan Ellison.

A Boy and His Dog may also refer to:

== Films ==
- A Boy and His Dog (1946 film), American short drama film directed by LeRoy Prinz based on a story by Samuel A. Derieux
- A Boy and His Dog (1975 film), American science fiction black comedy directed by L. Q. Jones based on Ellison's story
- A Boy and His Dog, alternate title for Wolf Dog, a 1958 American western film directed by Sam Newfield

== Other uses ==
- "A Boy and His Dog", an episode of Bates Motel season 1
- Boy and His Dog Sculpture, a 1923 statue by Cyrus Dallin, in Lincoln Cemetery, Lincoln Massachusetts, US
- "Boy and His Dog", a song from the1995 album Goodbye, Dr. Fate, by punk rock band Trusty
