= 1910 Boston mayoral election =

Election in Massachusetts, United States

- January 11, 1910
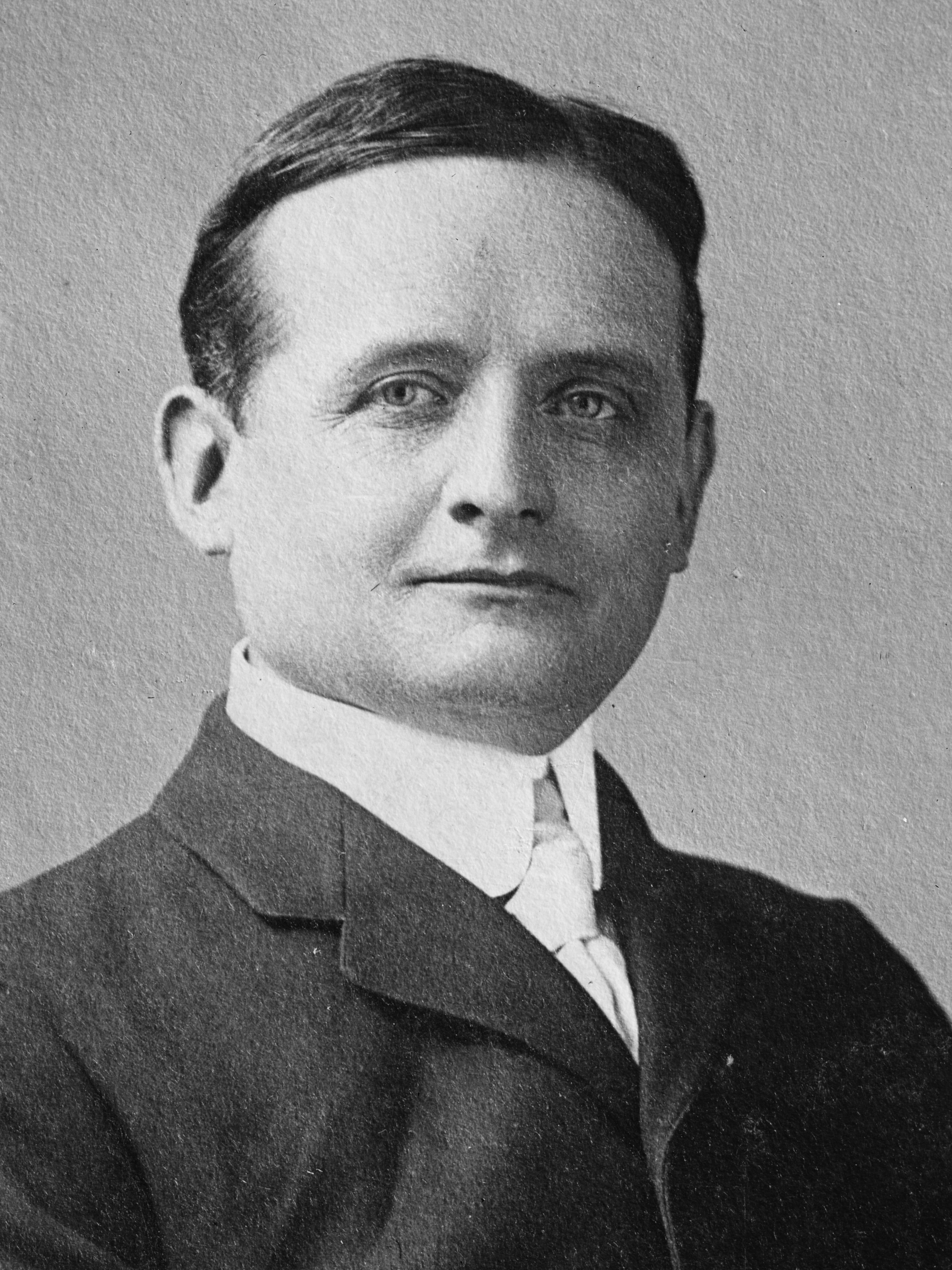

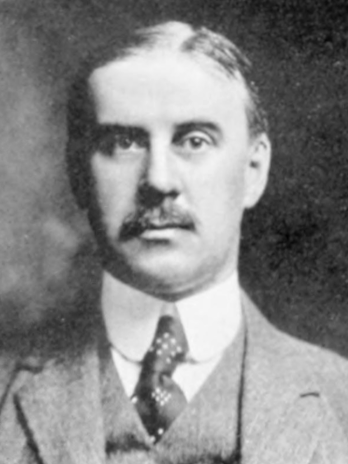
Candidate	John F. Fitzgerald	James J. Storrow
Party	Nonpartisan	Nonpartisan
Popular vote	47,172	45,757
Percentage	49.5%	48.0%
Mayor before election
George A. Hibbard
Elected mayor
John F. Fitzgerald

The Boston mayoral election of 1910 occurred on Tuesday, January 11, 1910. John F. Fitzgerald, who had been Mayor of Boston from 1906 to 1908, defeated incumbent George A. Hibbard and two other candidates.

This was the first Boston mayoral election held under a new city charter, which made the election nonpartisan, and increased the mayor's term from two years to four years. Due to November voting on the charter change, this election was held in January, with the term of the incumbent mayor extended into February.

Fitzgerald was inaugurated on Monday, February 7.

== Candidates ==
- John F. Fitzgerald, former Mayor of Boston (1906–1908), and former member of the United States House of Representatives (1895–1901) and the Massachusetts Senate (1892–1894)
- George A. Hibbard, Mayor of Boston since 1908
- James J. Storrow, banker
- Nathaniel H. Taylor, newspaper editorial writer, brother of The Boston Globe publisher Charles H. Taylor

=== Did not appear on ballot ===
- John C. Hadlock, lawyer. Arrested for submitting forged nomination papers. Charges were dropped Hadlock was committed to the New Hampshire State Hospital.

== Results ==
Candidates	General Election	
Candidates	Votes	%
John F. Fitzgerald	47,172	49.5%
James J. Storrow	45,757	48.0%
George A. Hibbard (incumbent)	1,816	1.9%
Nathaniel H. Taylor	613	0.6%

== See also ==
- List of mayors of Boston, Massachusetts
