= 1907 Boston mayoral election =

Election in Massachusetts, United States

- December 10, 1907
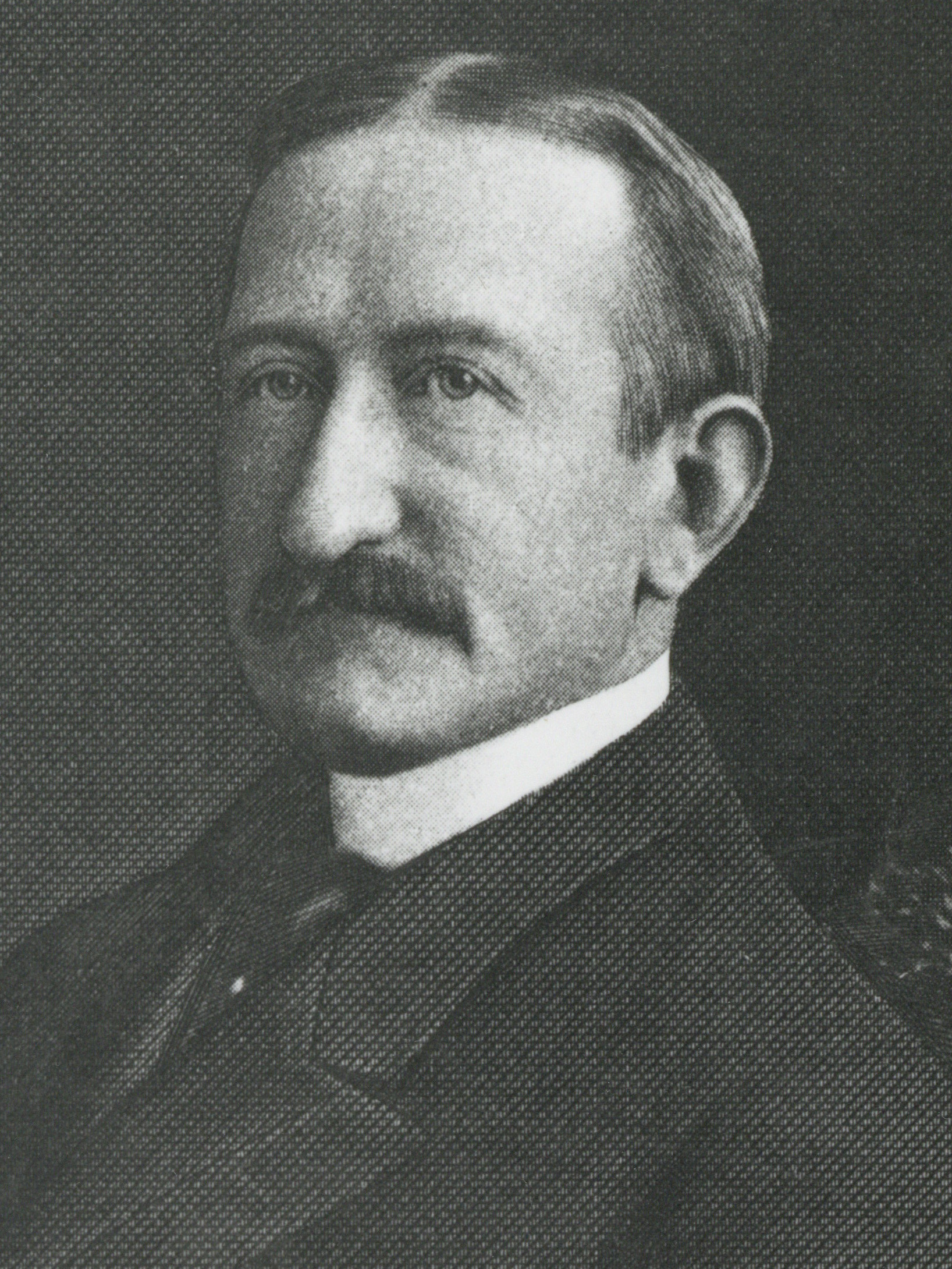

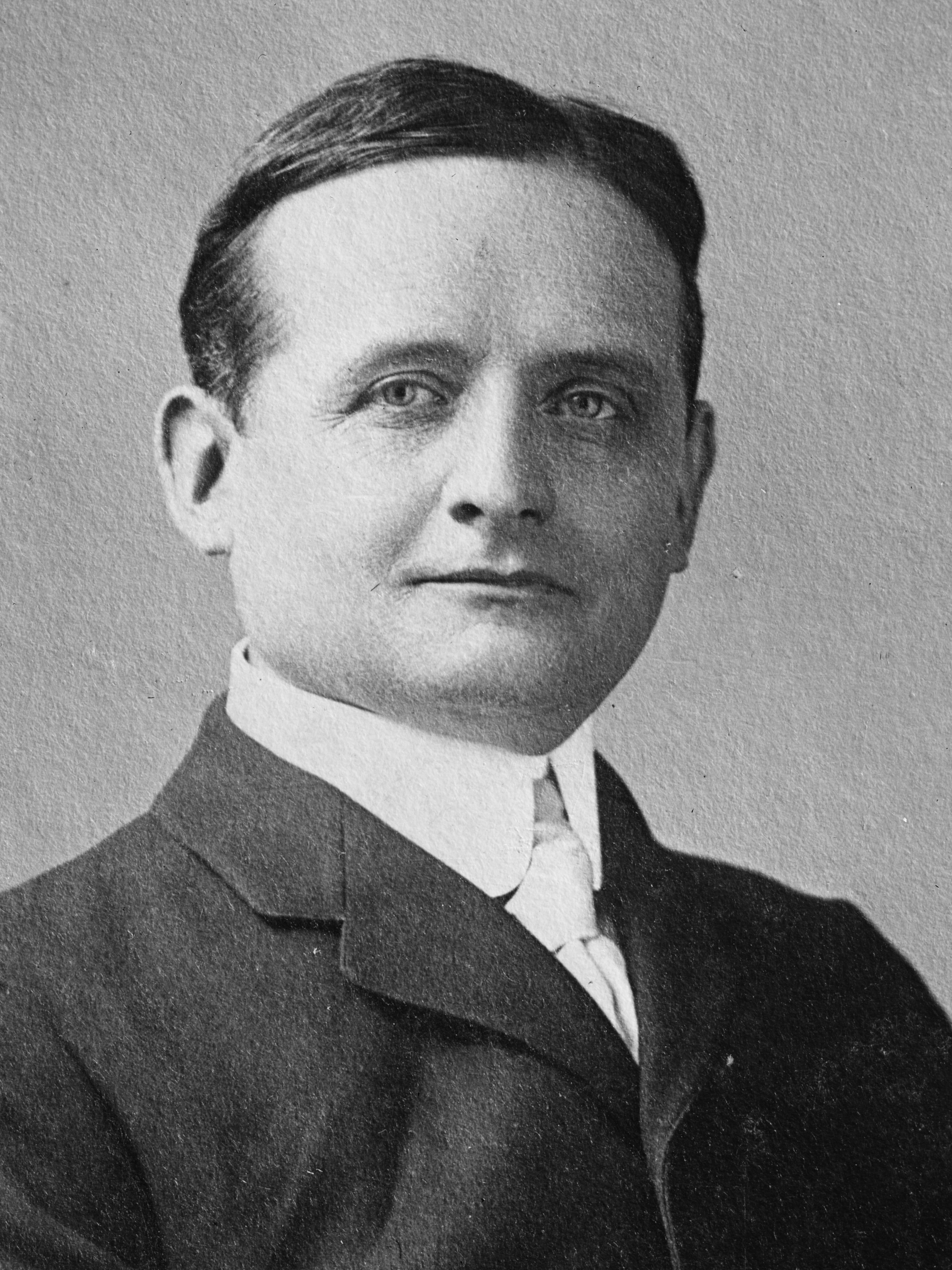

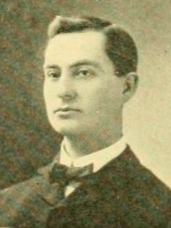
Candidate	George A. Hibbard	John F. Fitzgerald	John A. Coulthurst
Party	Republican	Democratic	Independence
Popular vote	38,112	35,935	15,811
Percentage	42.4%	40.0%	17.6%
Mayor before election
John F. Fitzgerald
Democratic
Elected mayor
George A. Hibbard
Republican

The 1907 Boston mayoral election was held on Tuesday, December 10, and saw Republican nominee George A. Hibbard defeat Democratic incumbent John F. Fitzgerald as well as Independence League nominee John A. Coulthurst. Ahead of the general election, primary elections for each party had taken place on Thursday, November 14, 1907.

This was the final Boston mayoral election for a two-year term, and that was partisan in nature; a new city charter adopted in 1909 made the mayoral term four years, and made Boston municipal elections non-partisan.

Hibbard was inaugurated on Monday, January 6, 1908.

== Results ==
Note: In October, John A. Coulthurst was selected as the Independence League candidate, and he resigned his position as secretary of the Democratic state committee. His still garnered some votes in the Democratic primary.

=== Democratic primary ===
- John A. Coulthurst, lawyer, former member of the Massachusetts House of Representatives (1902–1904)
- John F. Fitzgerald, Mayor of Boston since 1906, former member of the United States House of Representatives (1895–1901) and the Massachusetts Senate (1892–1894)

Candidates	Primary Election	
Candidates	Votes	%
John F. Fitzgerald (incumbent)	21,848	96.5%
John A. Coulthurst	425	1.9%
all others	372	1.6%

=== Republican primary ===
- Frederic W. Bliss, lawyer, former member of the Massachusetts House of Representatives (1891–1894)
- William E. Hannan, Street Commissioner, former member of the Boston Common Council (1901)
- George A. Hibbard, Postmaster of Boston since 1899, former member of the Massachusetts House of Representatives (1894–1895)

Candidates	Primary Election	
Candidates	Votes	%
George A. Hibbard	11,005	73.5%
William E. Hannan	2,637	17.6%
Frederic W. Bliss	1,296	8.7%
all others	37	0.2%

=== Independence League primary ===
- John A. Coulthurst, lawyer, former member of the Massachusetts House of Representatives (1902–1904)

Candidates	Primary Election	
Candidates	Votes	%
John A. Coulthurst	372	99.7%
all others	1	0.3%

=== General election ===
Candidates		General Election	
Candidates		Votes	%
R	George A. Hibbard	38,112	42.4%
D	John F. Fitzgerald (incumbent)	35,935	40.0%
I	John A. Coulthurst	15,811	17.6%
Scattering		13	0.0%
Total vote		89,871	100

== See also ==
- List of mayors of Boston, Massachusetts
