= Colin H. Livingstone =

Scouting pioneer and railway executive

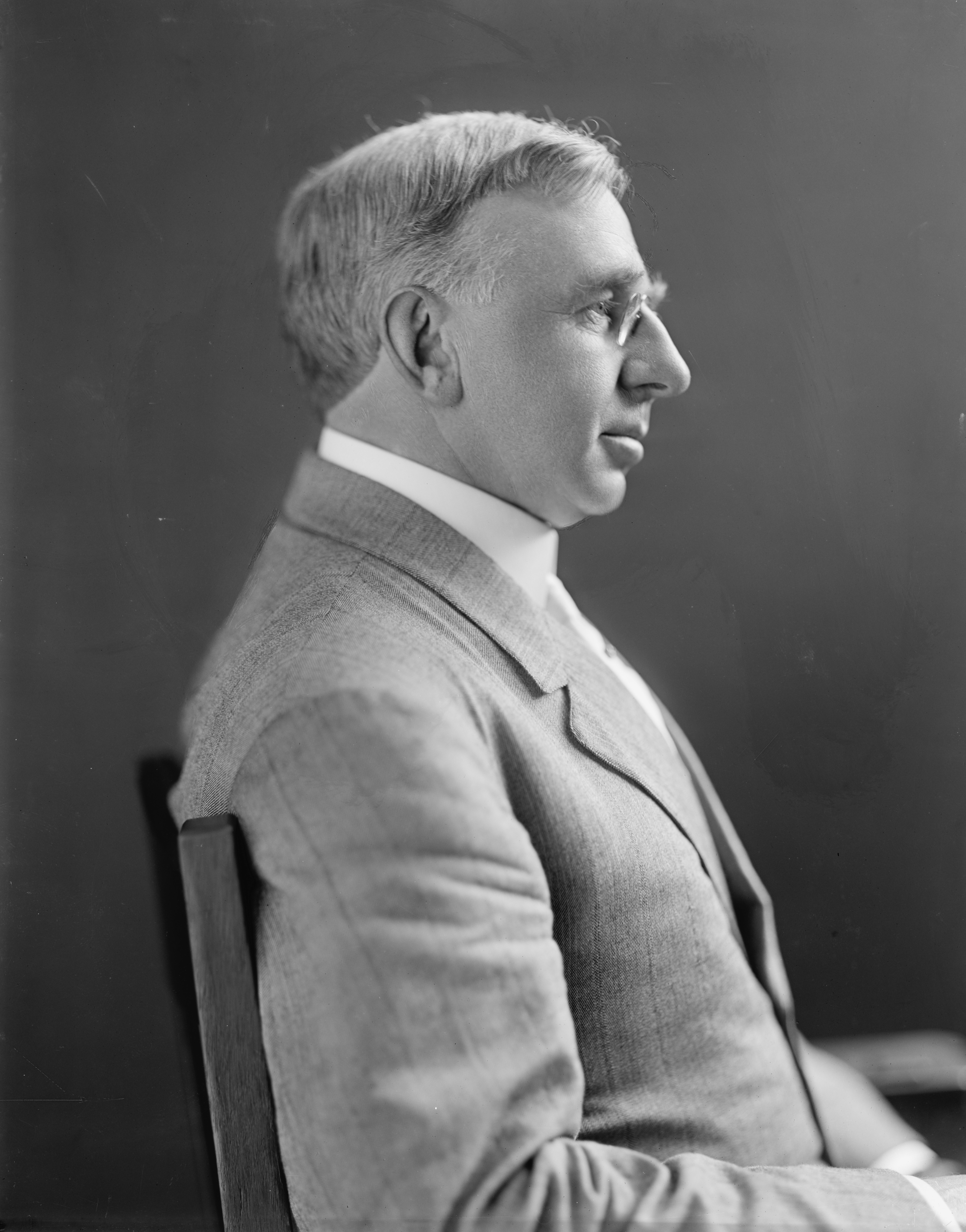
- Livingstone, taken some time between 1905 and 1943
- Born: Colin H. Livingstone; June 3, 1863; Saint John, New Brunswick, British North America
- Died: February 1, 1943 (aged 79)

Colin Hamilton Livingstone (June 3, 1863—February 1, 1943) was an American banker and a president of the Washington and Old Dominion Railway (W&OD RY), the Virginia Shipbuilding Corporation in Alexandria, and the Washington and Virginia Real Estate Company. He was also the first national president of the Boy Scouts of America (BSA).

== Life and career ==
Livingstone was born in Saint John, New Brunswick, British North America, on June 3, 1863, and attended McGill University in Montreal. He served as the president of the BSA from 1910 to 1925. During that period, he also became the president of the W&OD RY, which was incorporated during 1911, and served as a vice-president of the American National Bank.

Livingstone served as a private secretary to Senator Stephen Benton Elkins of West Virginia and as the clerk of the Interstate Commerce Committee of the United States Senate.

Livingstone was the namesake of a 90 acres (0.4 km^{2}) Arlington County, Virginia, subdivision, Livingstone Heights, and of a nearby W&OD RY station with same name. Arlington's present 24th Street North was Livingstone Street, also named for Livingstone, until the County renamed its streets during 1935.

Livingstone died at age 79 on February 1, 1943, in Fishersville, Virginia. He is buried with his wife, Anna Louise Van de Boe, within the churchyard of the Reformed Dutch Church of Claverack in Claverack, Columbia County, New York.

== See also ==
- History of the Boy Scouts of America

== Notes ==
Boy Scouts of America
New title	National president 1910–1925	Succeeded by James J. Storrow
