= Kitsap Sun =

Daily newspaper published in Bremerton, Washington

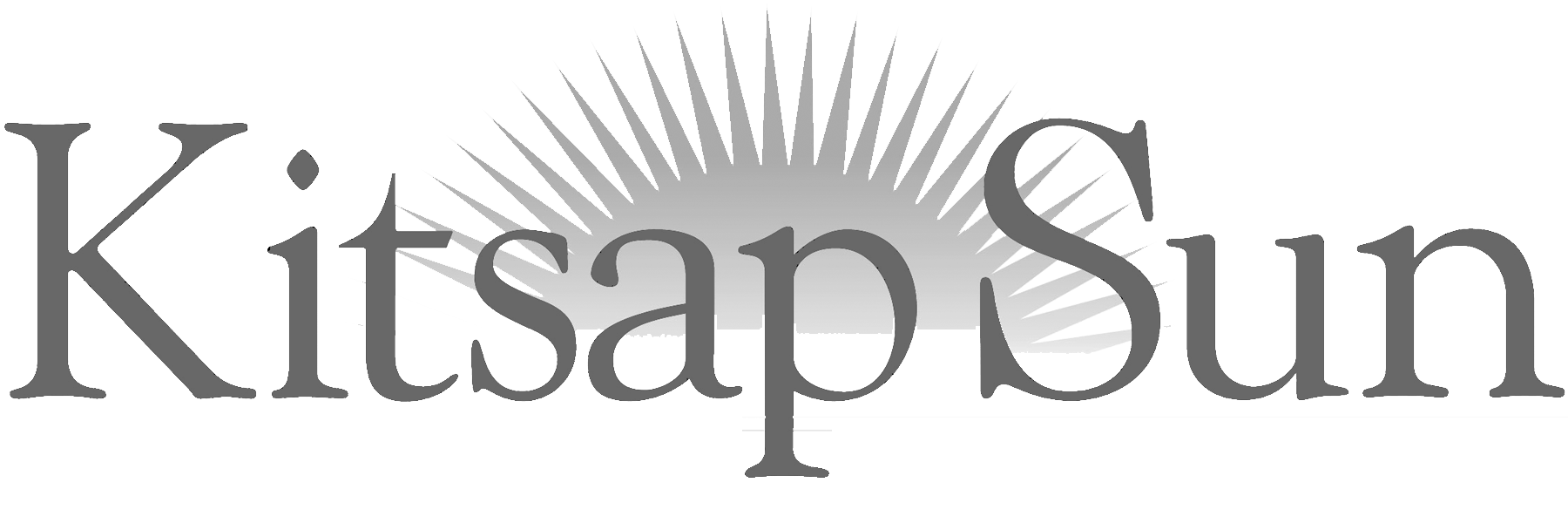
- Type: Daily newspaper
- Format: Broadsheet
- Owner: USA Today Co.
- Publisher: Brent Morris
- Editor: David Nelson
- Founded: July 15, 1935; 91 years ago (as Bremerton Sun)
- Language: English
- Headquarters: Bremerton, Washington, United States
- Circulation: 16,683 (as of 2022)
- ISSN: 2837-8547
- OCLC number: 60449235
- Website: kitsapsun.com

The Kitsap Sun is a daily newspaper published in Bremerton, Washington, United States. It covers general news and serves Kitsap, Jefferson, and Mason counties on the west side of Puget Sound.

== History ==
Kitsap Sun, Bremerton, WA

On July 15, 1935, the first issue of Bremerton Sun was published. It was created by the Scripps League Newspapers and was a sister publication of The Seattle Star. Its first editor was Julius Gius. In 1940, E. W. Scripps and J. G. Scripps, controlling stockholders of the company, agreed to sell a major interest in the Sun to their cousin John P. Scripps and his company called John P. Scripps Newspaper Group.

In June 1984, the paper formally changed its name from the Bremerton Sun to The Sun. The company merged with the E. W. Scripps Company in 1986, and the paper began publishing a Sunday morning edition in 1991. On May 22, 2005, the newspaper was renamed the Kitsap Sun to reflect the regional nature of its coverage.

The company spun off its newspaper assets into Journal Media Group in April 2015. A year later the company was acquired by and then merged with Gannett. In 2021, the paper sold its office at 545 Fifth Street, which it had occupied for 75 years.

== Archive ==
The University of Washington Library holds copies of the Kitsap Sun from 1935 to present.

== Notable staff ==
- Adele Ferguson, columnist from 1945 to 1993 and first full-time female reporter at the Washington State Legislature in Olympia
