= Cortland, Illinois =

Cortland
- Town
- Motto: The Third Largest Town in Illinois
- Location of Cortland in DeKalb County, Illinois.
- Coordinates: 41°55′10″N 88°39′12″W
- Country: United States
- State: Illinois
- County: DeKalb
- Incorporated: February 16, 1865

Government
  - Mayor: Mark Pietrowski

Area
  - Total: 3.66 sq mi (9.47 km^{2})
  - Land: 3.65 sq mi (9.45 km^{2})
  - Water: 0.0077 sq mi (0.02 km^{2})
- Elevation: 869 ft (265 m)

Population (2020)
  - Total: 4,398
  - Density: 1,205.3/sq mi (465.37/km^{2})
- Time zone: UTC-6 (CST)
  - Summer (DST): UTC-5 (CDT)
- ZIP Code(s): 60112
- Area code: 815
- FIPS code: 17-16470
- GNIS feature ID: 2396662
- Website: www.cortlandil.org

Cortland is an incorporated town in DeKalb County, Illinois, United States. The population was 4,398 at the 2020 Census. It was previously 4,270 at the 2010 census, up from 2,066 in 2000. Because of its status as an incorporated town, Cortland has adopted the slogan, "The Third Largest Town in Illinois". Only the towns of Cicero and Normal are larger, in terms of population. Most municipalities in Illinois are defined as "cities" or "villages."

== History ==
A post office called Cortland has been in operation since 1892. The town was named after Cortland, New York.

== Geography ==
According to the 2010 census, Cortland has a total area of 3.638 square miles (9.42 km^{2}), of which 3.63 square miles (9.40 km^{2}) (or 99.78%) is land and 0.008 square miles (0.02 km^{2}) (or 0.22%) is water. The town is located immediately east of the city of DeKalb and just south of the city of Sycamore.

== Demographics ==
Historical population
Census	Pop.	Note	%±
1880	953		—
1890	313		−67.2%
1900	261		−16.6%
1910	207		−20.7%
1920	238		15.0%
1930	262		10.1%
1940	230		−12.2%
1950	398		73.0%
1960	461		15.8%
1970	541		17.4%
1980	1,019		88.4%
1990	963		−5.5%
2000	2,066		114.5%
2010	4,270		106.7%
2020	4,398		3.0%
U.S. Decennial Census

=== Racial and ethnic composition ===
Cortland town, Illinois – Racial and ethnic composition Note: the US Census treats Hispanic/Latino as an ethnic category. This table excludes Latinos from the racial categories and assigns them to a separate category. Hispanics/Latinos may be of any race.
Race / Ethnicity (NH = Non-Hispanic)	Pop 2000	Pop 2010	Pop 2020	% 2000	% 2010	% 2020
White alone (NH)	1,898	3,356	3,011	91.87%	78.59%	68.46%
Black or African American alone (NH)	24	231	349	1.16%	5.41%	7.94%
Native American or Alaska Native alone (NH)	1	9	9	0.05%	0.21%	0.20%
Asian alone (NH)	26	72	61	1.26%	1.69%	1.39%
Native Hawaiian or Pacific Islander alone (NH)	0	0	2	0.00%	0.00%	0.05%
Other race alone (NH)	0	2	13	0.00%	0.05%	0.30%
Mixed race or Multiracial (NH)	26	73	204	1.26%	1.71%	4.64%
Hispanic or Latino (any race)	91	527	749	4.40%	12.34%	17.03%
Total	2,066	4,270	4,398	100.00%	100.00%	100.00%

=== 2020 census ===
As of the 2020 census, Cortland had a population of 4,398. The median age was 33.0 years. 28.8% of residents were under the age of 18 and 7.2% of residents were 65 years of age or older. For every 100 females there were 98.0 males, and for every 100 females age 18 and over there were 95.9 males age 18 and over.

94.1% of residents lived in urban areas, while 5.9% lived in rural areas.

There were 1,521 households in Cortland, of which 45.9% had children under the age of 18 living in them. Of all households, 54.9% were married-couple households, 14.9% were households with a male householder and no spouse or partner present, and 21.2% were households with a female householder and no spouse or partner present. About 17.3% of all households were made up of individuals and 5.8% had someone living alone who was 65 years of age or older.

There were 1,561 housing units, of which 2.6% were vacant. The homeowner vacancy rate was 1.8% and the rental vacancy rate was 2.7%. The population density was 1,202.63 inhabitants per square mile (464.34/km^{2}), and housing density was 426.85 per square mile (164.81/km^{2}).

Racial composition as of the 2020 census
Race	Number	Percent
White	3,242	73.7%
Black or African American	360	8.2%
American Indian and Alaska Native	21	0.5%
Asian	61	1.4%
Native Hawaiian and Other Pacific Islander	2	0.0%
Some other race	256	5.8%
Two or more races	456	10.4%

=== Income and poverty ===
The median income for a household in the town was $74,821, and the median income for a family was $98,984. Males had a median income of $51,393 versus $26,688 for females. The per capita income for the town was $32,578. About 0.6% of families and 4.5% of the population were below the poverty line, including 0.5% of those under age 18 and 3.3% of those age 65 or over.

== Notable person ==
- Charles W. Nash (1864–1948), automobile industry entrepreneur, born in Cortland
