= John P. Scripps Newspaper Group =

John P. Scripps Newspapers was an American newspaper chain founded by John P. Scripps, a grandson of E.W. Scripps, in 1928, and headquartered in San Diego. Its newspapers were concentrated in the western United States. The chain merged with the E. W. Scripps Company, then known as Scripps-Howard, in 1986.

== Newspapers ==
- Ventura County Star-Free Press
- Thousand Oaks News-Chronicle
- The Tribune (San Luis Obispo)
- Watsonville Pajaronian-Register
- Tulare Advance-Register
- Redding Record Searchlight
- Kitsap Sun
