= The Tribune (San Luis Obispo) =

Semiweekly broadsheet newspaper and news website in California

- Type: Semiweekly newspaper
- Format: Broadsheet
- Owner: The McClatchy Company
- Publisher: Tim Ritchey
- Editor: Joe Tarica
- Founded: August 7, 1869; 157 years ago
- Headquarters: 3940-7 Broad St. PMB 325, San Luis Obispo, California, 93401
- Circulation: 16,125 Daily; 17,518 Sunday (as of 2020)
- ISSN: 2996-6922
- Website: sanluisobispo.com

The Tribune is a semiweekly broadsheet newspaper and news website that covers San Luis Obispo County, California. It is the successor to the Morning Tribune, Daily Telegram and Morning Herald. The Tribune previously published two weeklies, The Cambrian of Cambria and The Sun Bulletin of Morro Bay.

== History ==
On August 7, 1869, the first edition of The Tribune was published in San Luis Obispo, California. Walter Murray was the paper's first editor and co-owner. At that time Murray was district attorney and published out of a adobe cottage at 721 Monterey Street. H.S. Rembaugh was employed as printer.

In October 1871, Murray sold the paper to James J. Ayers, but it was returned to him after three months. In April 1872, Murray sold out again, this time to Rembaugh. In 1874, O.F. Thornton became editor and purchased a half-interest. In 1878, Rembaugh and Thornton sold the Tribune to J.K. Tuley and W.W. Walters Jr., who hired George B. Staniford as editor. Staniford bought a third-interest.

In January 1883, Tuley and Staniford sold the Tribune to Myron Angel and Charles Maxwell. In February 1885, W.H. McEwen bought out Maxwell, who in turn was bought out by Benjamin H. Brooks in September 1885. By 1886, the Tribune was produced above the Chicago Brewery Depot housed at the corner of Chorro and Monterey streets.

In February 1905, C.A. Black founded the Daily Telegram in San Luis Obispo. In March 1912, C.L. Day, former owner of the Long Beach Press, purchased the Daily Telegram. Brooks edited the Tribune until 1922. In 1923, C.L. Day bought the Morning Herald from John A. Rollins. In 1924, Day sold the Daily Telegram to James A. Easton and R.C. Hoyt and a few months later Day bought the Porterville Recorder. In 1925, Brooks sold the Morning Tribune to Easton and Hoyt who then merged it with the Morning Herald to form the Morning Tribune-Herald.

In 1926, Easton and Hoyt sold the San Luis Obispo Daily Telegram and Morning Tribune-Herald to Scripps-Howard Newspapers, also known as the E. W. Scripps Company. On April 17, 1939, the Telegram and Tribune were consolidated to form the Telegram-Tribune. In June 1940, John P. Scripps Newspaper Group acquired the paper. In 1958, the publication moved from 1240 Morro Street to 1321 Johnson Avenue, operating there for the next 35 years.

In 1986, John P. Scripps merged with E. W. Scripps Company. In 1993, the Telegram-Tribune moved to a new building at 3825 S. Higuera Street. In 1997, Scripps traded the paper, along with The Monterey County Herald, to Knight Ridder in exchange for the Boulder Daily Camera. In 1999, the paper was renamed to The Tribune. In 2006, the McClatchy Company purchased Knight Ridder in a deal valued at $4.5 billion.

In February 2015, the paper's publisher, Bruce Ray, announced his resignation; Fresno Bee president and publisher Tom Cullinan was named publisher for the paper. In late 2015, along with many other McClatchy newspapers, The Tribune went through a redesign, adopting a companywide design style for both print and online platforms. Ken Riddick was named president and publisher of The Tribune in October 2017.

Effective June 5, 2023, the paper's daily print edition will arrive via the U.S. Mail instead of delivery by a local carrier. In February 2024, the paper announced it will decrease the number of print editions to two a week.
