= Charles W. Nash =

American businessman (1864–1948)

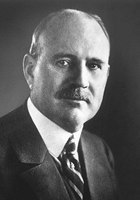
- Born: Charles Williams Nash; January 28, 1864; Cortland, Illinois, US
- Died: June 6, 1948 (aged 84); Beverly Hills, California, US
- Occupations: Automobile industry entrepreneur and executive
- Years active: 1890–1936
- Employers: General Motors; Nash Motors
- Known for: General manager of Buick; 5th president of General Motors; Established Nash Motors
- Spouse: Jessie Halleck
- Awards: 1946: "Ten pioneers" Automotive Hall of Fame; 1975: Inductee Automotive Hall of Fame

Charles Williams Nash (28 January 1864 – 6 June 1948) was an American automobile entrepreneur who served as an executive in the automotive industry. He played a significant role in building up General Motors as its fifth president. In 1916, he bought the Thomas B. Jeffery Company, makers of the popular Rambler automobile, and renamed it Nash Motors. The resulting firm played an independent role in an automobile industry increasingly dominated by the Big Three: General Motors, Ford, and Chrysler.

Nash's profits came from focusing on one well-designed car in the upper-medium price range. He bought several distressed companies in Wisconsin, merging them and installing advanced managerial accounting procedures while cutting costs and focusing on long-term growth. He retired as president in 1932, but remained chairman of the board. He facilitated the merger in 1937 with Kelvinator, a refrigerator, home appliance, and commercial refrigeration manufacturer.

== Early life ==
Nash was born to a poor farming family in Cortland, Illinois, on what is now Route 38 — Lincoln Highway. His mother was Anna E. "Annie" Cadwell, who married David L. Nash. Other Nash siblings included Mazovia, George C., and Laura W.

Charles' parents separated when he was six years old and abandoned him. As a result of a court order, he worked as a farmhand in Michigan as an indentured servant under an agreement that was to last until he was 21. Nash had only three months of schooling per year while he was "bound out" to perform farm chores.

At age 12, Nash ran away and became a farmhand, first in Grand Blanc, Michigan, for $8 per month, then for Alexander McFarland in Mount Morris, Michigan, for $12 per month. On McFarland's farm, he learned the carpentry trade from John Shelben and formed the "Adams & Nash" concern to press hay.

While pressing hay on the Halleck farm, he met his future wife, Jessie Halleck, and married her on April 23, 1884. They moved to Flint, Michigan, due to Jessie's poor health. In 1890, Nash was hired by William C. Durant of the Flint Road Cart Company, which later became the Durant-Dort Carriage Company.

== Automobile industry ==
Durant hired Nash in 1890 for $1 per day as an upholstery stuffer in the Flint Road Cart Company (renamed to Durant-Dort Factory One). Within six months, he was promoted to superintendent of the factory.

Within ten years, Nash became vice president and general manager of the Durant-Dort Carriage Company. Nash introduced the straight-line belt conveyor into the assembly of carriages. In 1897, Nash had a chance to drive an early automobile and immediately became interested in its commercial possibilities.

=== General Motors ===
By 1910, the chief business of Durant-Dort Carriage Company was building automobile bodies for the Buick unit of General Motors, which was founded in 1908 by Durant, who had bought Buick in 1904. Durant found himself short of both capital and skilled management.

Durant brought in Nash to Buick to oversee production. Durant was not concerned that Nash did not have any automotive industry experience; his expertise was in dealing with people and also how to organize an efficient production line. James J. Storrow followed the recommendation and appointed Nash as vice-president of Buick on December 13, 1910.

Nash was searching for an expert in day-to-day manufacturing operations so he could focus more on sales, supplier relations, and logistics. In 1912, Nash hired Walter P. Chrysler from the American Locomotive Company to be Buick's works manager.

In late 1912, Durant was fired by the General Motors board, and on 19 November, Nash was elected as the fifth president of the company because he had earned the trust of the bankers who controlled the board of directors. Durant had acquired numerous automakers without analyzing their contribution to the product mix and some like Elmore, Cartercar, Reliance Motor Truck, Welch Motor Car, were money-losing operations that left the company financially overextended; thus, there was concern if it could even survive another five years.

Under Nash's leadership, General Motors made immense gains in profits earned and in the number of vehicles produced. Nash focused on making GM more efficient by eliminating unprofitable products and streamlining manufacturing. He arranged for GM to purchase 51% of axle maker Weston-Mott. Cost-cutting and higher sales were his top priorities. There was tight control of inventories and cash at the corporate level, as well as changes designed to maximize production at each factory.

Nash had restored GM to organizational stability and financial health. This was reflected in 1914 profits at $7.2 million and doubling for 1915 as well as again doubling for 1916, with the automaker taking in nearly $29 million.

His strategy of consolidating into large units paid off: he combined three different truck operations into one and merged several parts-making operations. Keen to build up international markets, Nash set up the General Motors Export Company to handle global sales. He also moved GM's general offices from New York to Detroit, created a new purchasing office, and set up a new accounting office with standardized accounting procedures. However, Nash was reluctant to pay dividends to shareholders.

By late 1915 and early 1916, Billy Durant attempted to reassert his control over the company, and Nash was caught in the power struggle between Durant and bankers. By May 1916, Durant regained control of the majority of voting stock. He offered Nash a $1 million annual salary to remain with the automaker. Nash described the salary as "more than a man’s worth" and resigned on June 1.

== Nash Motors ==
After Nash clashed with Durant, he resolved never to work for someone else again. Along with former GM executives, James J. Storrow and Walter P. Chrysler, Nash attempted to take over Packard, but the luxury car maker's board of directors demurred.

Nash learned that the heirs of the Jeffery Motor Company of Kenosha, Wisconsin, were anxious to retire. The company was best known for its Rambler brand of cars and numerous innovations. Nash bought out the pioneering automaker in August 1916 with a down payment check of half a million dollars and the total deal worth $5 million (some reports indicate the price was $9 million). One of the first major investors was Alfred P. Sloan. While Jeffery Motors had total stock of $3 million, the newly incorporated Nash Motors became a substantial force with capital stock value of almost $24 million on 29 July 1916.

In 1917, he renamed the company Nash Motors. The 1917 Nash Model 671 was the first automobile to bear the name of the new company's founder. Nils Erik Wahlberg, a former GM engineer, developed new cars and engines for the 1918 model year. Nash Motors became successful almost immediately, with sales totaling 31,008 trucks and cars by 1919.

Nash was able to negotiate procurement contracts with the United States Army during World War I, which made the company one of the largest producers of trucks in the nation. In 1918, Nash was appointed to take charge of the engineering and production of aircraft matters for the war effort.

In addition to running his own company, Charles Nash served as president of the luxury automaker LaFayette Motors until Nash Motors bought out the company in 1924.

By 1929, the Big Three automakers (GM, Ford, and Chrysler) controlled 75 percent of the automobile market. Nash Motors was in fourth place, producing 138,000 vehicles in 1928.

Nash focused on producing one high-quality automobile for the upper-medium price range, later adding a smaller, less expensive model, the Ajax. Nash realized he could never compete with the market diversity of the Big Three, so he based his profits on careful management, close attention to costs, and expansion opportunities. Nash was a hands-on executive who concentrated on developing more efficient purchasing and setting up accounting procedures to specify the source of profits and expenses.

Nash acquired other car companies, including Mitchell Motors of Racine in 1923 and LaFayette Motors of Milwaukee in 1924.

During the Great Depression, Nash cars were popular because they provided high quality, durability, and the look of luxury at a relatively low price. The company also saw an opportunity in the luxury car market segment. It introduced the top-of-the-line Ambassador models on a 142 in (3,607 mm) wheelbase in 1932 that soon earned the nickname of "Kenosha Duesenbergs" because of their quality.

During a time when most others were operating in the red or going bankrupt, Nash Motors was only one of two firms in the automobile industry generating a profit. In November 1932, Nash was honored by Sales Management (now Sales Management and Marketing) magazine as "The Pace Setter for the Auto Industry."

Nash gave up the presidency in 1932, but remained board chairman. Nash wanted George W. Mason as his executive vice president, and to have Mason, he had to buy Kelvinator, a leading manufacturer of refrigerators.

After twenty years of success in running his company, Nash turned it over in 1937, and the merged company was renamed Nash-Kelvinator.

== Retirement ==
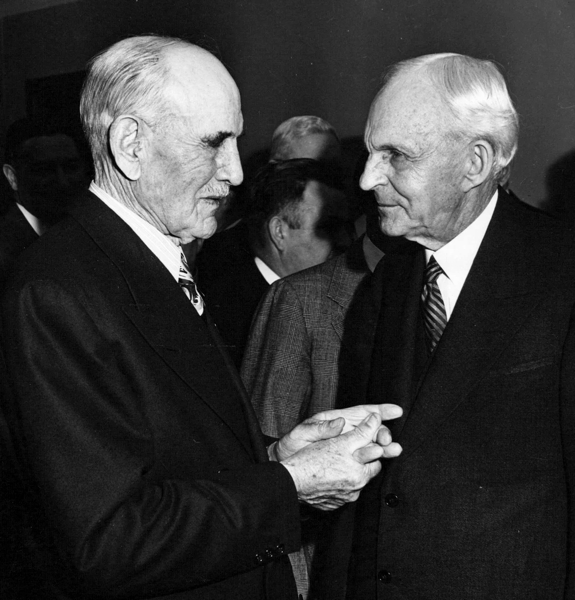
Nash and Henry Ford at the 1946 Automotive Jubilee when both were 82

Nash retired from his namesake company in 1936 to live in California.

The Automotive Golden Jubilee was a weeklong event sponsored by the Automobile Manufacturers Association (AMA) in Detroit. Among the festivities was bringing together fourteen living automotive pioneers. On May 31, Charles Nash was among the honored to receive the "Charles Clifton Award" for their contributions to developing an industry and putting people on wheels.

Nash's health started to fail during his wife's illness and eventual death in 1947. He is quoted as describing himself as "the most common cuss that lived." He died in 1948 at the age of 84 in Beverly Hills, California. Always proud of belonging to the "common people", he left an estate valued at about US$50 million (approximately US$670,000,000 in 2025 dollars). Nash was interred in the Forest Lawn Memorial Park Cemetery in Glendale beside his wife.

== Legacy ==
Nash is best remembered for responding to public demand by building smaller, more economical, and affordable cars. Nash Motors successfully marketed cars to America's middle class. Charles Nash is also recognized for lean operations in business that included scheduling production and material orders closely, carrying a small inventory, and having flexibility in meeting the changing market needs during the economic turmoil of the 1920s and 1930s. Nash is also credited with developing the straight-line conveyor belt assembly system that he first introduced at the Durant-Dort Carriage Company factory.

Charles W. Nash's achievements by 1926 were characterized as a genuine success story:

A man who, in the short space of nine years, has built up a business on which there is not a dollar of bonded indebtedness, whose stocks have a market value approximating $137,000,000, whose profits have exceeded $56,000,000, and whose bank balance tops $30,000,000, surely must be regarded as a very practical authority on what makes for success.

— Automotive Giants of America: Men Who Are Making Our Motor Industry

== Timeline ==
- 1890 - Charles Nash was hired to stuff seat cushions at Durant-Dort Carriage Company
- 1904 - Durant buys Buick, takes Nash with him as assistant manager
- 1910 – Charles Nash takes control of General Motors from William Durant
- 1912 – Charles Nash hires Walter P. Chrysler to manage the Buick division of General Motors
- 1912 – Nash becomes president of General Motors
- 1916 – William Durant re-gains control of General Motors, and Charles Nash resigns
- 1916 – Charles Nash buys the Thomas B. Jeffery Company, maker of the Rambler
- 1917 – Thomas B. Jeffery Company is renamed "Nash Motors"
- 1917 – First Nash designed car, "Model 681" is produced
- 1918 – Nash becomes the largest producer of trucks in the world, building 11,490 four-wheel drive quads for the US Army
- 1919 – Nash purchased half interest in the Seamon Body Corporation of Milwaukee - the builder of bodies for Rambler, Jeffery, and Nash
- 1925 – Purchased plant from the Mitchell Motor Car Company in Racine, Wisconsin
- 1930 – Nash retires and becomes chairman of the Board
- 1937 – Merged Nash with Kelvinator to form Nash-Kelvinator and made George W. Mason the CEO
- 1948 – Nash dies

== Gallery ==
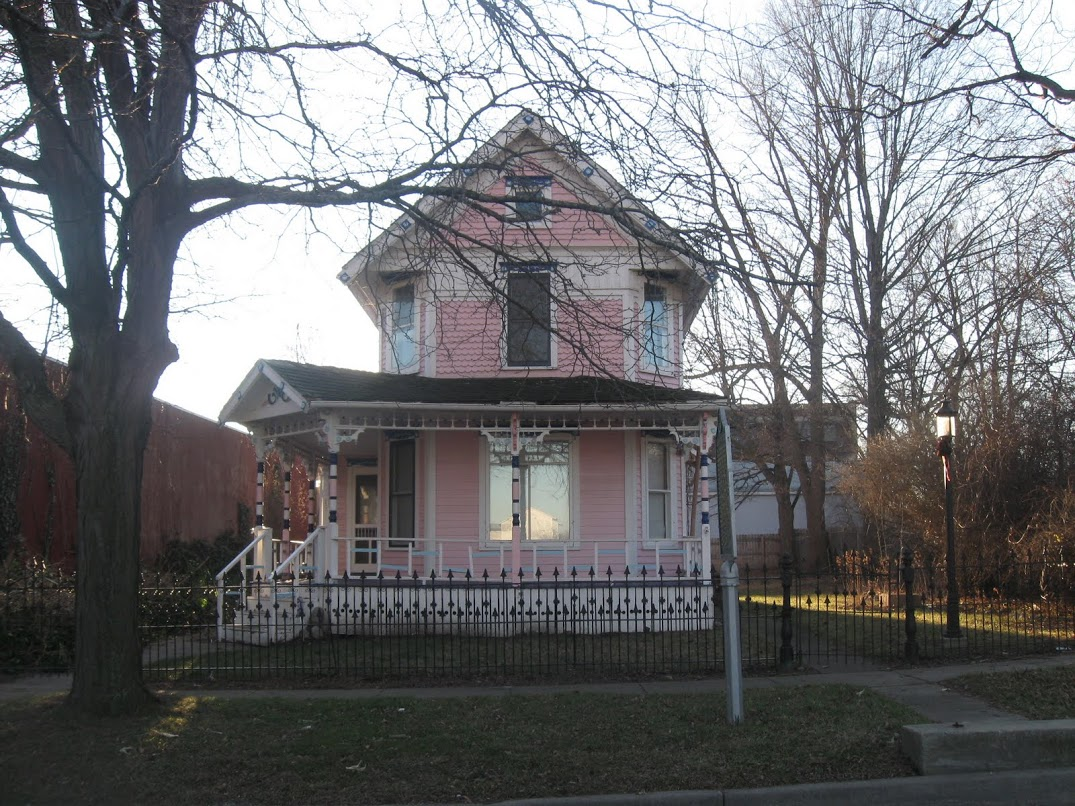
Charles Nash Home, Flint, MI

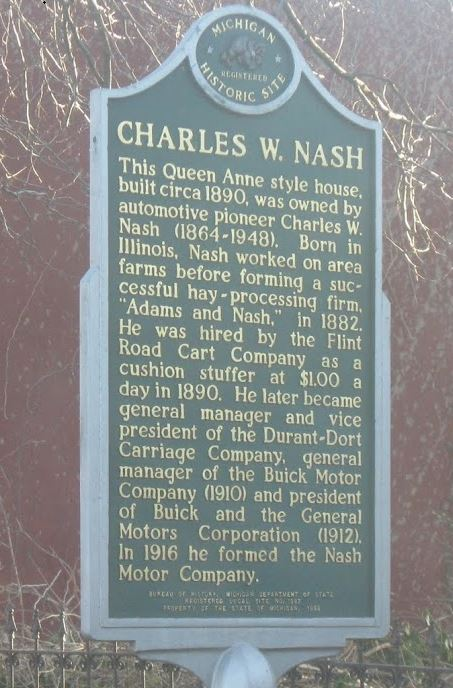
Charles Nash Historical Marker, Flint, MI

Business positions
Preceded by Thomas Neal	President of General Motors; 1912–1916	Succeeded by William C. Durant
Preceded by Thomas B. Jeffery Company	Chairman and CEO of Nash Motors; 1916–1936	Succeeded by George W. Mason
