= Boy and His Dog Sculpture =

Boy and His Dog or Storrow Memorial
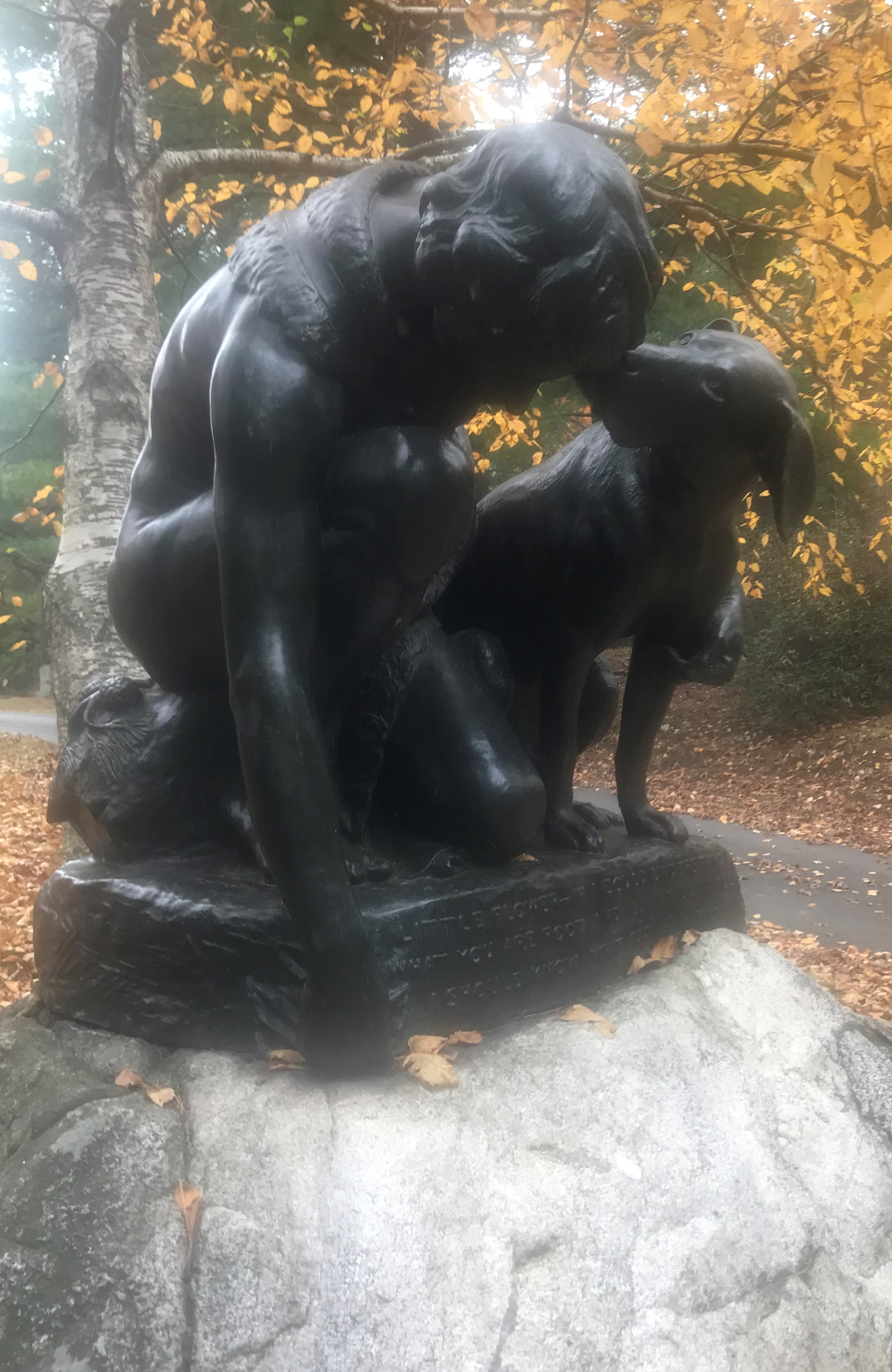
- The sculpture in 2020
- Artist: Cyrus Edwin Dallin
- Year: 1923
- Type: Bronze
- Location: Lincoln, Massachusetts, U.S.

Boy and His Dog Sculpture or Storrow Memorial is a 1923 statue by Cyrus Dallin, located in a prominent location in Lincoln Cemetery in Lincoln, Massachusetts, United States. It portrays a young man bending down to pick a flower with a dog gazing up into his visage. It was created at the request of Helen Osborne Storrow as a memorial to her husband James Jackson Storrow. The Storrows are interred 30 feet north of the monument across a small road in a grave overlooking a picturesque pond.

There also is a Storrow Memorial located within the eponymous park they helped create along the Charles River in Boston.

== Description and history ==
The bronze sculpture was commissioned by Mrs. Storrow, who had resided with her husband in Lincoln. She had requested a sculpture that would capture the spirit of the outdoors and be acceptable to those who were religious.

The 46 1/2-inch sculpture portrays a young man with his left knee on the ground, bent over to pick a flower with his right hand. His left-hand rests over the far side of a seated dog encircling it. The dog is gazing attentively at the young man.

The base of the bronze sculpture contains a quote by the English poet Alfred Lord Tennyson from his poem Flower in the Crannied Wall. The quote reads “Little flower - if I could understand what you are root and all, and all in all, I should know what God and man is.”

The sculpture rests on a rough granite stone that is six feet high.

There are similarities between this work and a 1903 sculpture of Tennyson executed by George Frederic Watts located on the grounds of England's Lincoln Cathedral. Watts’ sculpture contains the full text of the poem. It also has a person with an attentive dog, but in this case the person is a standing Tennyson.

The posture of the boy is similar to that of another Cyrus Dallin statue, the Menotomy Hunter in Arlington, Massachusetts. The Menotomy Hunter is reaching down with his hand to capture water to drink as refreshment on his homeward journey after a successful hunt.

== See also ==
- List of sculptures by Cyrus Dallin in Massachusetts
