= Thomas Neal (industrialist) =

Canadian American industrialist (1858 – 1940)

Chairman of the Board of General Motors
- In office November 19, 1912 – November 16, 1915
- Preceded by: Position created
- Succeeded by: Pierre S. du Pont

President of General Motors
- In office January 26, 1911 – November 19, 1912
- Preceded by: James J. Storrow
- Succeeded by: Charles W. Nash

Personal details
- Born: Thomas Neal; September 27, 1858; Corunna, Ontario, Canada
- Died: October 6, 1940 (aged 82); Detroit, Michigan, U.S.
- Spouse: Elizabeth May Davies (m. 1884)
- Children: 1

Thomas Neal (September 27, 1858 – October 6, 1940) was an American industrialist who served as the president and chairman of the board at General Motors.

== Early life ==
Neal was born in Corunna, Ontario on September 27, 1858, to English immigrants Henry and Mary (Proctor) Neal. In 1866, the Neals moved to Detroit, where Neal attended Detroit Public Schools and completed a course at a local business college. On May 14, 1884, Neal married Elizabeth May Davies, sister of his childhood friend and Acme White co-founder William L. Davies. They had one son, Kirke.

== Business career ==
Neal began his career as a messenger boy for the National Pin Company. He rose to the position of office manager, but left the company after four years to join the Imperial Life Insurance Company and work in real estate. In 1884, Neal helped organize the Acme White Lead & Color Works. He was the company's chairman until 1921, when he sold his interest in the business. Neal was also a director of the First National Bank, Michigan Savings Bank, and Kemiweld Can Company.

In 1910, General Motors was taken over by a group of financiers, including Neal, who was elected to the board of directors. On January 26, 1911, James J. Storrow was elected chairman of the finance committee, which had full control over the company's fiscal affairs, and Neal was elected to succeed him as GM's president. As president, Neal consolidated the production of GM's five brands (Cadillac, Buick, Oakland, Oldsmobile, and Cartercar) to its most productive factories. In 1912, with the company under better financial conditions, Neal resigned as president and became chairman of the board of directors. He was succeeded by Buick factory manager Charles W. Nash. He left General Motors in 1915.

In 1916, Neal was elected chairman of the executive committee of the Signal Motor Truck Company. He helped found the Equitable Trust Company of Detroit in 1927 and served as chairman of the board until his death on October 6, 1940.
