= George A. Hibbard =

American politician (1864–1910)

George Albee Hibbard
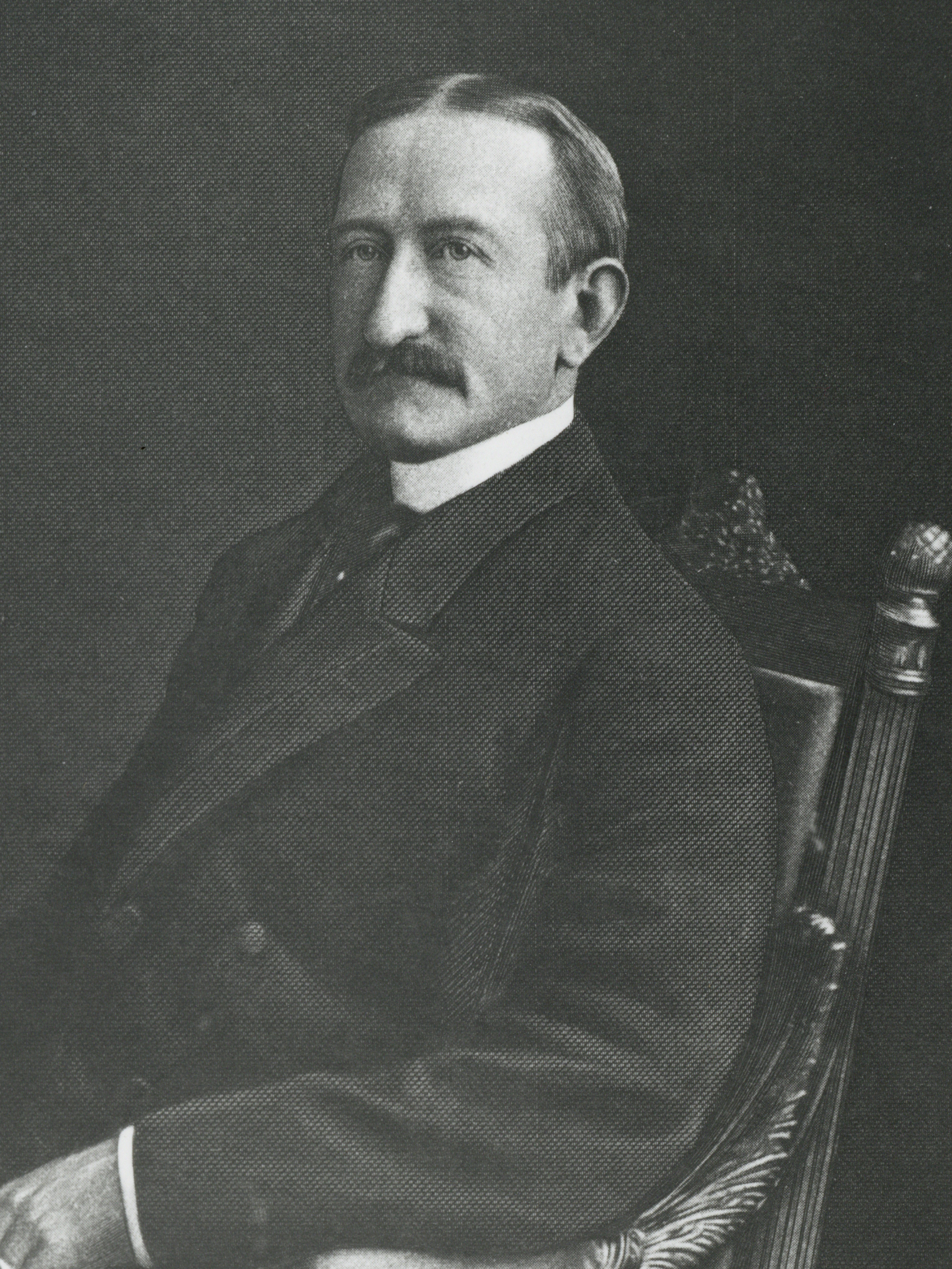

Mayor of Boston
- In office January 6, 1908 – February 7, 1910
- Preceded by: John F. Fitzgerald
- Succeeded by: John F. Fitzgerald

Massachusetts House of Representatives 18th Suffolk District
- In office 1894–1895

Personal details
- Born: October 27, 1864 Boston, Massachusetts, U.S.
- Died: May 29, 1910 (aged 45) Dorchester, Boston, Massachusetts, U.S.
- Party: Republican
- Spouse: M. Adelaide Ford
- Education: Harvard University

George Albee Hibbard (October 27, 1864 – May 29, 1910) was an American businessman and politician who served as the mayor of Boston from 1908 to 1910.

== Early life ==
George Albee Hibbard was born in Boston on October 27, 1864. His father was a wholesaler at Quincy Market with ardent abolitionist beliefs. He attended Boston Public Schools and graduated from Harvard University in 1880. At the age of 20, he began working for his father, and he passed the bar in 1885.

== Business career ==
He began his independent career in the 1880s, going into the insurance industry. He then later worked for a firm that dealt in the commercial paper business, and then was the treasurer of a tailoring business. His time as a businessman was considered unsuccessful.

== Political career ==
Hibbard became Postmaster of Boston in 1899. In the December 1907 mayoral election, Hibbard ran as a Republican against incumbent and Democratic candidate John F. Fitzgerald. Hibbard defeated Fitzgerald, 38,112 votes to 35,935; a third candidate, John Coulthurst, a Democrat running as the Independence League candidate, had 15,811 votes. Hibbard served as mayor from January 1908 to February 1910.

Historian Peter Jones argues that Hibbard was not a true reformer. His triumph in the mayoral election was a result of Fitzgerald's blunders. It was a transient reaction to the Democratic Party's high spending. Hibbard, during his two years as mayor, made drastic cuts, releasing nearly a thousand city workers, halving street maintenance expenses, and decreasing the city's debt. He also established a permanent Finance Committee appointed by the governor to act as a counterweight to the local Democrats. Nonetheless, his actions earned him numerous enemies, and the reform coalition refused to endorse him for reelection. Despite this, the ailing mayor ran anyway, spurred on by Fitzgerald who wanted to divide the vote. In the January 1910 election, out of the 95,000 votes cast, Fitzgerald won with 47,177, reformer James Storrow received 45,775, and Hibbard obtained a mere 1,614 votes.

== Death ==
On May 29, 1910, four months after the election, Hibbard died in his home of tuberculosis. He was 45 years old.

== See also ==
- Timeline of Boston, 1890s-1900s

Political offices
Preceded by John F. Fitzgerald	Mayor of Boston, Massachusetts; 1908–1910	Succeeded by John F. Fitzgerald
