= James J. and Helen Storrow Memorial =

Memorial in Boston, Massachusetts, U.S.

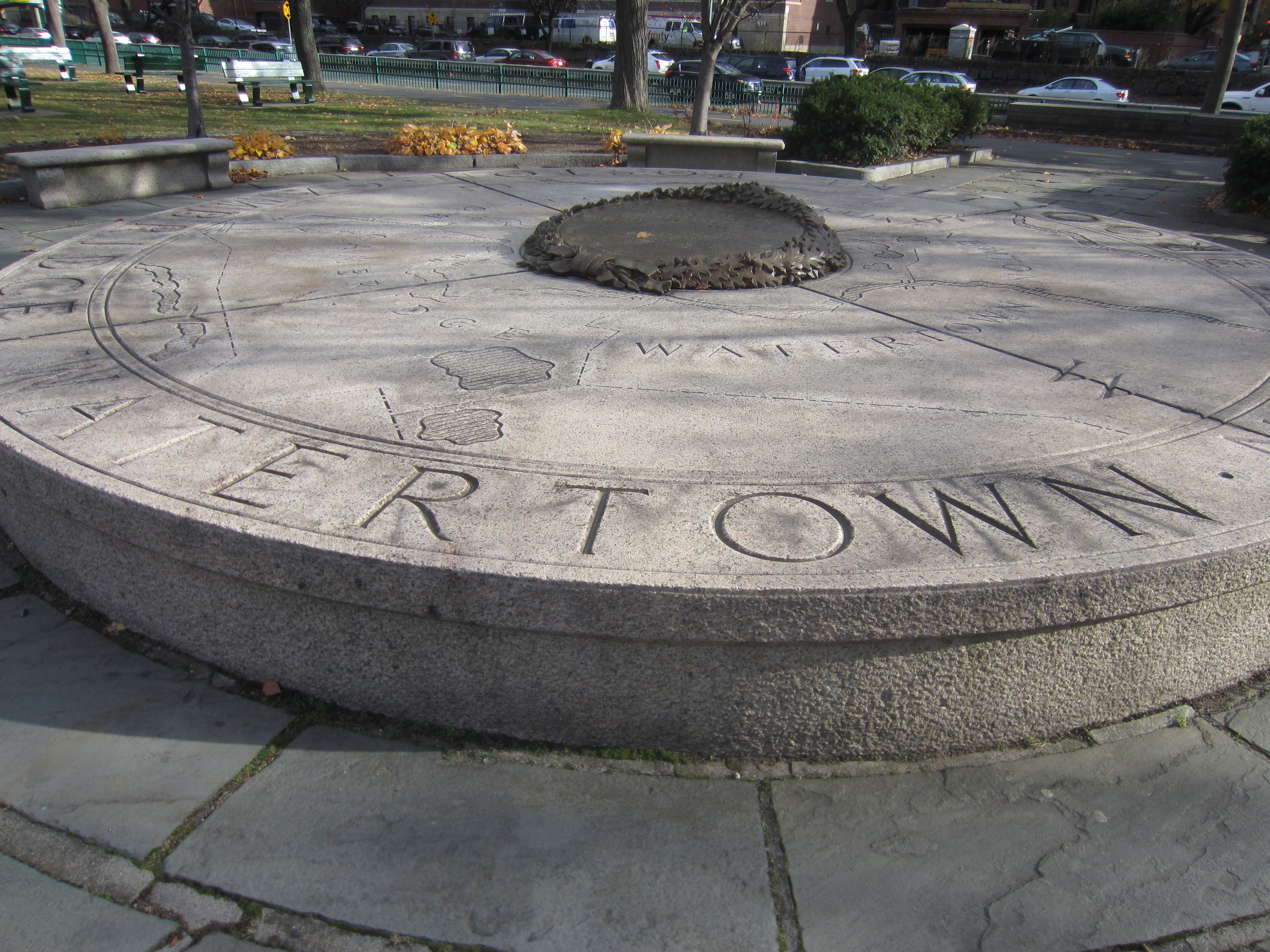
- The memorial in 2019
- Year: 1948
- Subject: Map of Boston
- Location: Boston; 42°21′10.5″N 71°5′9.5″W

The James J. and Helen Storrow Memorial is a memorial commemorating James J. Storrow and Helen Storrow, installed along Boston's Charles River Esplanade, in the U.S. state of Massachusetts. Installed in 1948, the memorial features a bronze sculpture on a granite platform with an engraved map of Boston. The couple's only son, James Jackson Storrow III, attended the unveiling ceremony.

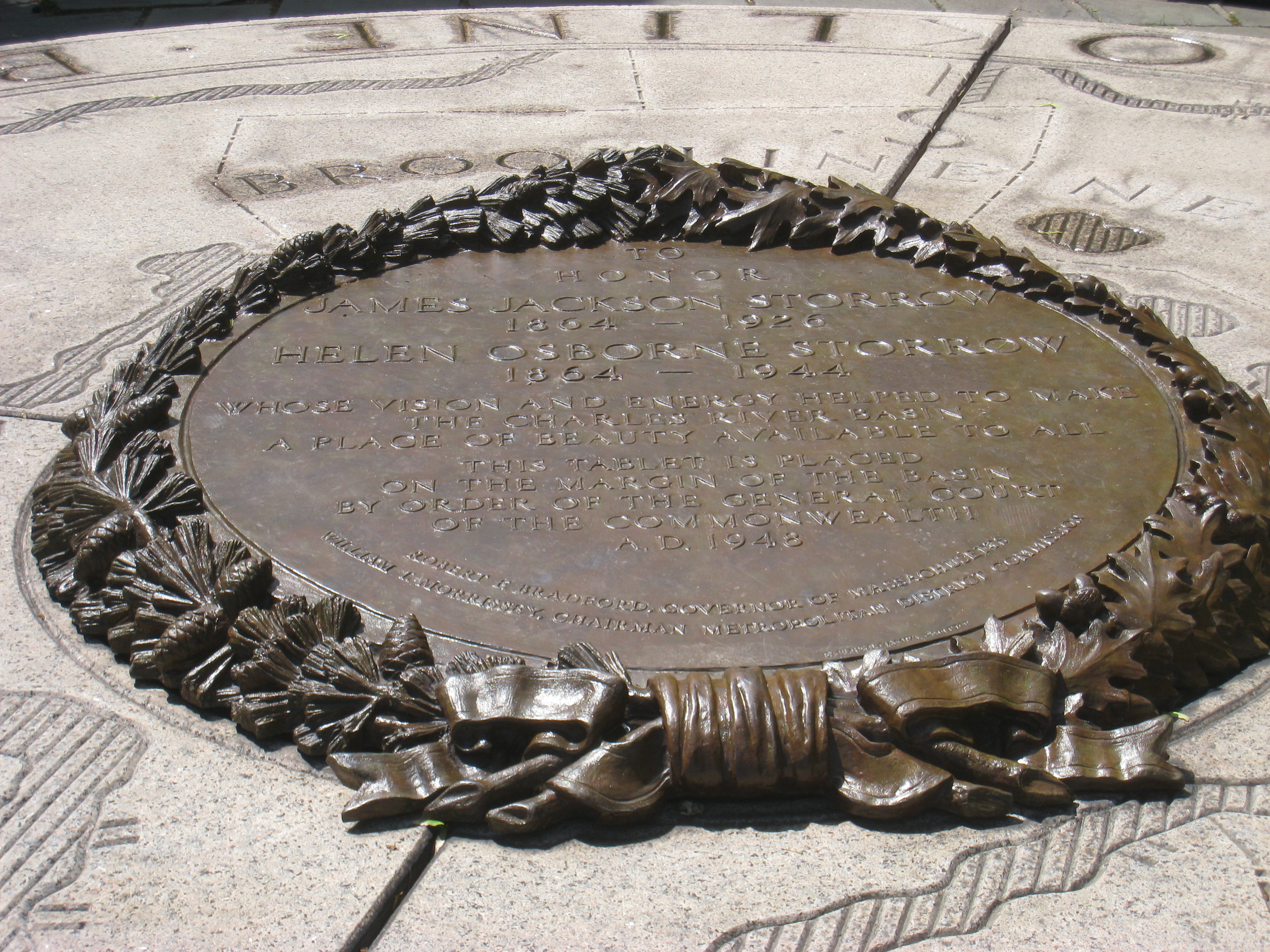
Detail, 2009
