= Adele Ferguson (American journalist) =

American journalist (died 2015)

Adele Ferguson (1924/1925 – March 3, 2015) was an American journalist for the Bremerton Sun. She was the first woman to work as a full-time reporter at the Washington State Legislature in Olympia, Washington, a position she held for 32 years.

== Life and career ==
Ferguson grew up in Minnesota as a member of a large family, the second of ten children. Ferguson, who never attended college and had no formal training, first joined a newsroom in 1943 by lying about her previous experience. After the conclusion of World War II, Ferguson began working for the Bremerton Sun as a columnist, initially covering local politics and the Bremerton Police Department. Her column was titled "The Farmer's Daughter" and was published in the "women's section" of the newspaper. In 1957 she was excluded from a journalists tour on the USS Nautilus (SSN-571) nuclear-powered submarine for being a woman. After a column she wrote about the snub attracted nationwide attention, the Navy reversed their decision and gave her a personal tour.

Ferguson began exclusively covering the Washington State Legislature in 1961, becoming the first full-time female reporter there for any newspaper. She faced sexism and harassment upon moving to Olympia. In 2008 she recounted that "they didn't speak to me, the men," referring to other members of the press pool. Early in her time there she was sexually harassed by a state senator. Over time, however, she gained a reputation for being a fierce and blunt reporter. Former Washington Secretary of State Ralph Munro once commented on her columns, saying:

Adele is the only legitimate tsunami to ever hit the state capitol. Elected officials would rush to the one news stand that carried The Bremerton Sun in the Legislative Building to see who she had drowned in her column this week. Those who weren't totally dead from the wave would often take weeks to recover their ego and energy. Adele knew how to hit and hit hard.

She retired from full-time reporting in 1993 but continued to write the occasional column until her death in 2015. In 1998 a bridge across Washington State Route 305 in Poulsbo was named "The Adele Ferguson Overpass" in her honor.

In 2009 she was one of the first three people honored by the Washington State Legacy Project, which publishes detailed histories of notable Washington residents.

== Personal life ==
Ferguson was married to John Philipsen from 1946 until his death in 2005. She had been briefly married before meeting him. She had two children. Ferguson was politically a conservative, and often attracted controversy for her political opinions. She died on March 3, 2015, at the age of 90.
