= Redding Record Searchlight =

Daily newspaper published in Redding, California

- Type: Daily newspaper
- Format: Broadsheet
- Owner: USA Today Co.
- Founder: M. E. Dittmar
- President: Paula Goudreau
- Editor: Jenny Espino
- Founded: 1894; 132 years ago
- Language: English
- Headquarters: 1320 Yuba St.; Redding, CA 96001 US
- ISSN: 2994-158X (print); 2994-1598 (web)
- OCLC number: 20396150
- Website: redding.com

The Redding Record Searchlight is a newspaper serving Redding, California. It has a daily print circulation of under 15,000 and has between 100,000 and 400,000 unique visitors per month to its news website, Redding.com.

== History ==
In December 1894, A. R. Bowen & Co. published the first issue of The Searchlight in Redding. At that time the morning newspaper was affiliated with the People's Party. Its founder was M. E. Dittmar who owned the paper for five years.

In October 1899, the paper was purchased by Mel G. Johnson and J. W. Brackett. In 1905, Johnson sold his half-interest in The Searchlight to his business partner Brackett. In 1909, Brackett retired and sold the paper to Herbert Lyle Moody, who ran the paper for over a decade until selling it in 1925 to his son Herbert G. Moody. At that time the Shasta Sun, owned by the younger Moody and founded 18 months prior, was absorbed into The Searchlight. In 1936, he sold the paper to Walter H. Fink, owner of the Courier-Free Press.

On October 17, 1938, the John P. Scripps Newspaper Group published the first edition of the afternoon newspaper Redding Record. In April 1941, Scripps bought The Searchlight and Courier-Free Press from Fink and consolidated the three papers together to form the Redding Record Searchlight.

In 2014, Scripps purchased Journal Media Group and transferred ownership of the Record Searchlight to the company. It then sold the newspaper group in April 2016 to Gannett and the Record Searchlight became part of the USA Today network. In May 2024, the newspaper announced it will switch from carrier to postal delivery.
