= Ventura County Star =

Newspaper in Ventura, California

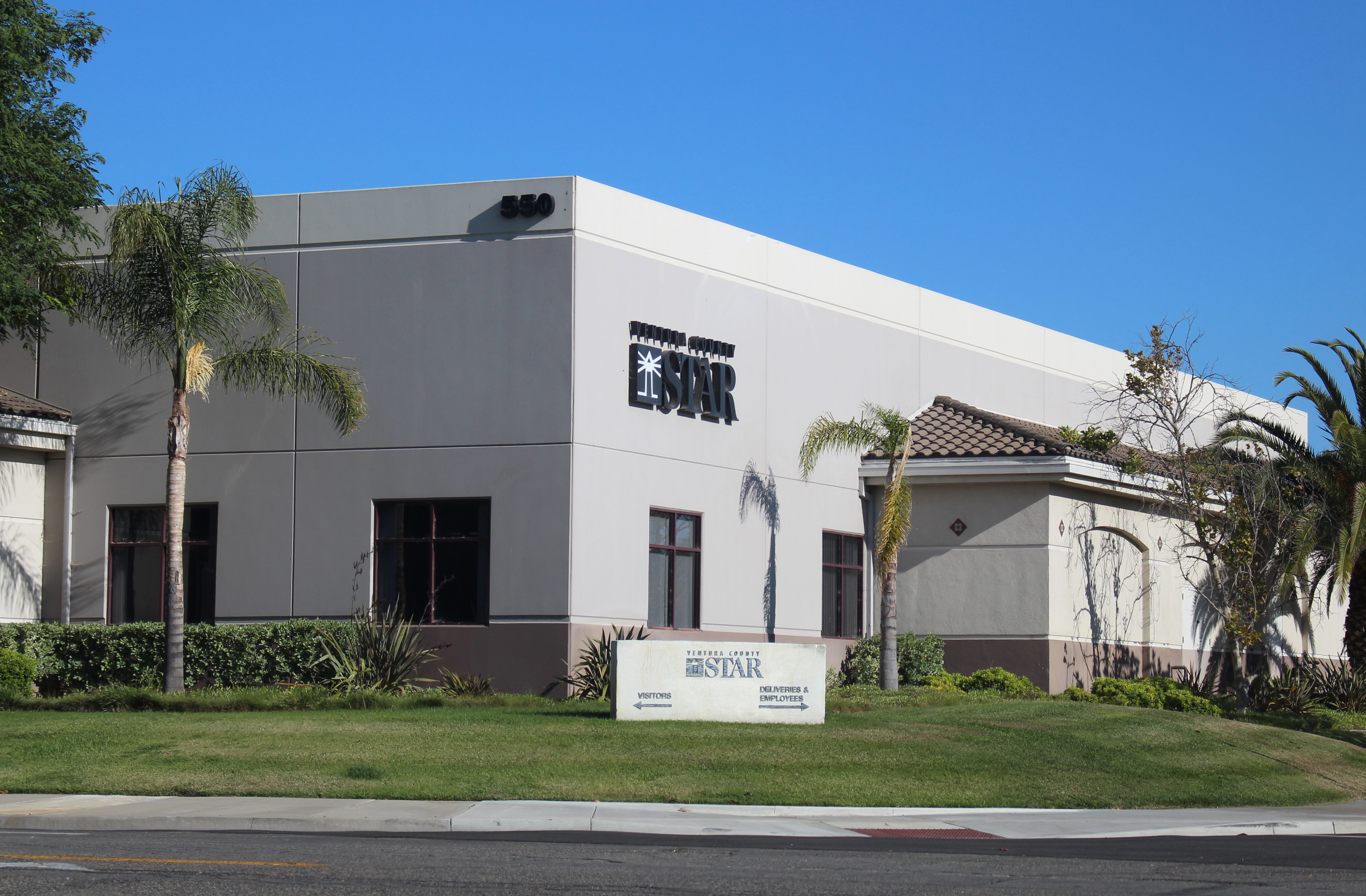
- Ventura County Star's former headquarters (before May 2018)
- Type: Daily newspaper
- Owner: USA Today Co.
- Founder(s): Roy D. Pinkerton; William H. Porterfield
- Founded: 1925; 101 years ago
- Language: English
- Headquarters: 771 E. Daily Dr; Camarillo, California
- ISSN: 2994-2381 (print); 2994-239X (web)
- Website: vcstar.com
- Free online archives: cdnc.ucr.edu (1965-2001)

The Ventura County Star is a daily newspaper published in Camarillo, California and serves all of Ventura County. It is owned by USA Today Co., the largest publisher of newspapers in the United States. It is a successor to a number of daily newspapers published around Ventura County during the 20th century.

== History and ownership ==
On June 15, 1925, the first issue of the Ventura County Star was published. Its first publisher was Roy D. Pinkerton. He co-founded the Star with William H. Porterfield, who died in 1927. An early stockholder in the Star was John P. Scripps Newspaper Group.

In 1936, the Star acquired rival paper Ventura Free Press (which itself was founded in 1875) from Dan W. Emmett, and soon began publishing as the Ventura County Star-Free Press. In 1986, John P. Scripps merged with E. W. Scripps Company.

=== 1990s Ventura County "Newspaper Wars" ===
E. W. Scripps purchased the Camarillo Daily News in 1992 from Harris Enterprises. The daily Simi Valley Enterprise and the weekly Moorpark News-Mirror also were acquired in 1992. Scripps also owned the daily Thousand Oaks News Chronicle. Editor & Publisher magazine called Ventura County the "site of one of the hottest newspaper wars in the nation." The Los Angeles Times, Los Angeles Daily News and the Thomson Newspapers group all published competing Ventura County newspapers. The Camarillo Daily News stopped publishing in December 1993. The competing Thomson Oxnard Press-Courier last published on June 14, 1994. The Thomson weekly newspapers, the Camarillo Sun and Ventura Sun, also ceased publication. The Santa Paula Chronicle also ended publication.

The paper dropped the Free Press part of the name in November 1994.

=== 2015 spinoff ===
Scripps spun out its newspapers to Journal Media Group in April 2015, and Gannett acquired the Journal newspapers in April 2016. Daily circulation was reported to be around 45,700 and its Sunday circulation at 58,600.

=== 2018 Office move in Camarillo ===
After more than ten years at the 550 Camarillo Center Drive location, the Ventura County Star announced in May 2018 that they were moving to a new office on East Daily Drive in Camarillo.

== Leadership ==
From 1960 to 1987, the editor was Julius Gius, who was posthumously inducted into the California Newspaper Hall of Fame in 1998. George Cogswell III was publisher for five years, leaving in 2012 to be publisher and chief revenue officer of The Commercial Appeal in Memphis, Tennessee. followed by Shanna Cannon. As of October 2016, the president is Mark J. Winkler.

== Incidents ==
=== Calvin Sharp murder case gag order ===
In December 2008, Judge Ken Riley ordered the Ventura County Star not to print the content of an affidavit, which the public defender representing defendant Calvin Sharp claimed could prejudice potential jurors. Although unenforceable under the First Amendment by Judge Riley's own admission, he refused to lift the order. This gag order was lifted by Judge Riley by December 15, 2008. A redacted copy of that affidavit was made available on the Ventura County Star web site. Judge Riley would step down in January 2009. Sharp's arraignment was delayed until March 2009. Sharp was sentenced to life in prison in 2012.

=== 2011 circulation practices ===
The Ventura County Star has faced many complaints that involved its circulation practices rather than its editorial content. As of April 2, 2011, the Better Business Bureau listed ten (10) separate "significant" complaints from the previous three years, of which two alleged the company made unauthorized debits from the customers' checking accounts, four alleged problems obtaining refunds, two alleged the company harassed a customer or former customer, two alleged improper billing, and two alleged delivery continued after customers tried to cancel. (The number of allegations does not add to the total number of complaints because two of the complaints made multiple allegations.)
