= Milton A. McRae =

American newspaper publisher (1858–1930)

Third National President of the Boy Scouts of America
- In office February, 1926–May, 1926

President of the Detroit Board of Commerce
- In office 1911–1912

Personal details
- Born: July 13, 1858 Detroit, Michigan
- Died: October 11, 1930 (aged 72)
- Occupation: Military Officer

Colonel Milton Alexander McRae (July 13, 1858 – October 11, 1930) was an American newspaper publisher who co-founded the Scripps-McRae League of Newspapers (now Scripps-Howard) and United Press International. The son of Helen and Duncan Van McRae, he was born in Detroit, Michigan.

== Background ==
McRae attended the Detroit Public Schools and attended but did not graduate from Detroit Medical College.

In 1883, while serving as advertising manager of The Cincinnati Post, McRae met thirty-year-old E. W. Scripps, who had taken over as managing editor. The two began a business relationship that would last for many years.

In 1887, Scripps made McRae the managing director of the St. Louis Chronicle, a paper Scripps had purchased in 1880. In 1889, Scripps brought McRae on as a partner, and in 1894, together with Scripps and his half-brother George, McRae founded the Scripps-McRae League of Newspapers.

In 1907, the Scripps-McRae League of newspapers combined three regional press associations into the United Press Association.

McRae was President of the Detroit Board of Commerce from 1911 to 1912. He became the third national president of the Boy Scouts of America upon the death of James J. Storrow in 1926.

== Works ==
- McRae, Milton Alexander (1924). Forty Years in Newspaperdom: The Autobiography of a Newspaper Man. New York City: Brentano's – via HathiTrust.

== See also ==
- E. W. Scripps Company

Boy Scouts of America
Preceded by James J. Storrow	National president March–May 1926	Succeeded by Walter W. Head
