= James J. Storrow =

American businessman and politician (1864–1926)

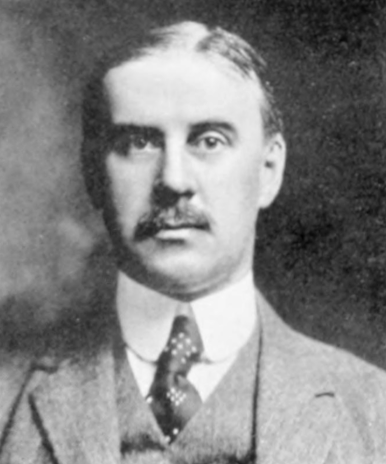
- c. 1910

President of the Boy Scouts of America
- In office May 29, 1925 – March 13, 1926
- Preceded by: Colin H. Livingstone
- Succeeded by: Milton A. McRae

President of the Boston City Council
- In office 1917
- Preceded by: Henry E. Hagan
- Succeeded by: Walter L. Collins

President of General Motors
- In office 1910–1911
- Preceded by: William M. Eaton
- Succeeded by: Thomas Neal

Personal details
- Born: January 1864 Boston, Massachusetts, US
- Died: March 13, 1926 (aged 62) New York, New York, US
- Resting place: Lincoln Cemetery; Lincoln, Massachusetts
- Party: Democratic
- Spouse: Helen Osborne
- Children: James Jackson Storrow III

James Jackson Storrow II (January 1864 (Note: The Class of 1885 Harvard College Secretary's Report gives Storrow's birthdate as January 19, 1864. The Boston Globe gave his date of birth as January 21, 1864. Storrow's headstone gives his date of birth as January 20, 1864.) – March 13, 1926) was an American investment banker, politician, and scouting leader. He gave up a legal career to become a partner in the investment bank Lee, Higginson & Co. He was also involved with automobile business, first as president of General Motors, then with Nash Motors. Active in public life, Storrow was a member of Boston's city council and school committee and lost a close race for Mayor in 1910. A leader in the Boy Scouts of America, he was the organization's second president.

Storrow was instrumental in promoting the construction of a dam at the site of Craigie bridge across the Charles River (connecting Boston with Lechmere Point in East Cambridge). In 1910, completion of the dam created the Charles River Basin, the first phase of waterfront park development that resulted in the Charles River Esplanade. Over the objection of his widow, Helen Osborne Storrow, a six-lane highway was built parallel to the Esplanade in the early 1950's and named James Jackson Storrow Memorial Drive.

== Early and family life ==
James J. Storrow was born in Boston in January 1864, the son of prominent Boston lawyer James Jackson Storrow (1837–1897) and his first wife, Anna Maria Perry (who died in 1865). His ancestors had been some of the first European settlers in what is now Maine. His grandfather, Charles Storer Storrow, was the chief engineer of the company that built the Great Stone Dam on the Merrimack River and was the first mayor of Lawrence, Massachusetts, while his great-grandfathers were the celebrated naval hero Oliver Hazard Perry and James Jackson, the first physician of the Massachusetts General Hospital. He had a younger brother, Samuel Storrow, and elder sister, Elizabeth Randolph Storrow.

Storrow graduated from George Washington Copp Noble's school in 1881, Harvard College in 1885, and Harvard Law School in 1888. He spent three years on the Harvard crew. He was its captain in 1885 and helped lead the Crimson to victory in that year's Harvard–Yale Regatta.

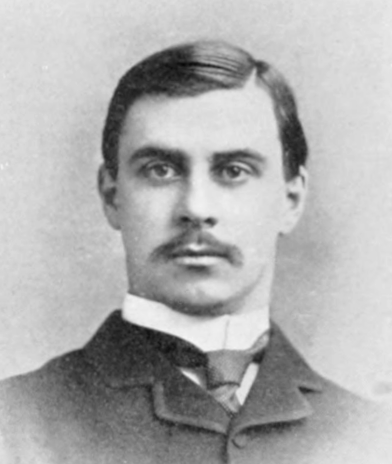
At Harvard, c. 1885

Storrow met Helen Osborne, daughter of David Munson and Eliza Wright Osborne and sister of Thomas Mott Osborne, while attempting to scale the Matterhorn in Switzerland. They married and had one son, James Jackson Storrow III (1892-1977). Helen Storrow became a prominent international Girl Scout leader, and both became known for social activism in Boston and New England.

== Business career ==
Storrow was admitted to the bar in 1888. He spent ten years as a member of the firm Fish, Richardson, & Storrow. The firm handled legal affairs for Lee, Higginson & Co. and in 1900, Storrow was persuaded to leave his law practice to join the investment bank as a partner.

In 1910, Storrow led a group of financiers organized as a voting trust who wrested control of General Motors from that corporation's founder Billy Durant. He was elected president of GM on November 23, 1910. On January 26, 1911, he was elected chairman of the finance committee, which had full control over the company's fiscal affairs, and was succeeded as president by Thomas Neal. Storrow, also on the board of the American Locomotive Company, introduced junior ALCO executive Walter Chrysler to GM's Charles Nash, who gave Chrysler the opportunity to revive the Buick division. Storrow left GM on June 4, 1916 after Durant regained control of the company. He then served as chairman of Nash Motors from 1916 until his death in 1926.

Storrow was a director of the United Shoe Machinery Corporation for many years. He left the board in 1909 to run for mayor, but remained a major shareholder. On September 19, 1911, Storrow and five USMC officers were indicted for violating the Sherman Antitrust Act. On November 20, 1911, United States Attorney Asa P. French nolle pros'd the indictments against Storrow due to a lack of evidence connecting Storrow with criminal activity within the three-year period specified in the statute of limitations.

Storrow also served as a director of the United Fruit Company, Dunlop Tire and Rubber Corporation of America, Essex Company, William Underwood Company, and Fairbanks-Morse, and was a trustee of the Institute of Economics and the Society for the Protection of New Hampshire Forests.

== Harvard ==
Storrow served as a Harvard College overseer from 1897 to 1909, spent a dozen years on the as a graduate member of the committee on athletics, and was a founder of the Harvard Magazine. He was reportedly under consideration to succeed Charles William Eliot as President of Harvard University, however he denied having interest in the position.

== Public service ==
Storrow also took a keen interest in his city and became known for his advocacy of civil service, educational and legal reforms. Unlike many of his Boston Brahmin peers, Storrow rejected nativism and anti-Catholic, anti-Semitic and anti-immigrant prejudices. As its first president, he helped diversify the Boston Chamber of Commerce, as well as to establish a juvenile court. A prominent Democrat, Storrow also often served as a mediator between corporate interests, the city, and labor unions.

=== Charles River Basin ===
In 1901, Storrow began a campaign to dam the Charles River and create the Charles River Basin, as well as to preserve and improve the riverbanks as a public park. Storrow faced opposition from some of Boston's powerful influences, including the city's chamber of commerce; however, the Massachusetts legislature approved the dam in 1903. The Boston Globe crediting Storrow's "hard work, influence and speeches before the legislature" for the bill's passage. The dam was completed in 1910.

=== School committee ===
In 1901, Storrow was elected to the Boston School Committee on the Democratic, Republican, and Public School Association tickets and served one three-year term. Storrow pushed for the expanded use of school buildings and served as chairman of the committee on the extended use of school buildings. The committee established educational centers that offered practical educational opportunities for working men and women. In 1905, he was the leading petitioner of a bill that reduced the size of the Boston school committee from 24 to 5. He ran for a seat on the new committee as a member of the Democratic "Regular", Republican, and Public School Association tickets. He was elected to a three-year term and served as chairman from 1906 to 1908.

=== Mayoral candidacy ===
In November 1909, Boston voters approved a charter change that made city elections nonpartisan and increased the mayor's term from two years to four years. Due to November voting on the proposed charter change, the 1909 mayoral election was pushed back to January 1910.

On November 17, 1909, the newly-formed Citizens' Municipal League chose Storrow as its candidate for mayor. The Citizens' Municipal League was made up mostly of Republicans, but Storrow was able to secure the endorsement of Democratic city committee president James Donovan and Congressman John A. Keliher. His campaign was managed by Edmund Billings, former secretary of the Good Government Association of Boston.

Storrow lost the race to former mayor John F. Fitzgerald 47,172 to 45,757.

=== Labor issues ===
On July 8, 1913, as part of agreement between the Boston Elevated Railway and the Boston Street Carmen's Union, Storrow was chosen to serve as chairman of a board of arbitrators that would settle issues between the two sides.

In 1919, Boston faced a possible strike by its police officers who were seeking the right to form a union under a charter from the American Federation of Labor. With police Commissioner Edwin U. Curtis at odds with the rank and file police, Boston Mayor Andrew J. Peters appointed Storrow to chair an ad hoc Citizen's Committee to review the matter. Storrow's group recommended that the police be allowed to form their own union, but that it should be independent and not affiliated with any other organization like the AFL. Commissioner Curtis rejected the recommendation and Boston experienced a dramatic police strike.

=== Boston City Council ===
On May 24, 1915, the Boston City Council chose Storrow to fill the vacancy caused by the death of William H. Woods. He received the votes of all six of the council's Good Government Association members and Daniel J. Gallagher and Patrick A. Kearns each received a vote from the non-GGA councilors. He ran for a full three-year term that November and received the most votes of the eight candidates running for the three council seats. He was elected council president in 1917. He chose not to run for reelection in 1918.

=== Fuel administrator ===
During World War I, Storrow served as chairman of the state committee on public safety, was the state's fuel administrator, and was the federal fuel administrator for New England. Storrow organized a system of fuel distribution for Massachusetts and wrote and enforced the rules regarding fuel restrictions in all of New England.

In 1922, Governor Channing Cox named Storrow chairman of an advisory coal committee that was in charge of rationing coal during the UMW General coal strike. During this time, Storrow was the consignee of all coal shipped into the state.

=== Railroad consolidation ===
In 1922, Cox appointed Storrow to chair the Massachusetts committee for consolidation of New England railroads. He also chaired the joint New England railroad committee, which in 1924 recommended the consolidation of all of the region's railroads.

== Boy Scouts of America ==
In 1919, Storrow was elected to the National Executive Board of the Boy Scouts of America. He became the second national president of the Boy Scouts of America, serving from 1925 until his death in 1926. He posthumously received the fifth Silver Buffalo Award, presented in 1926.

== Death and legacy ==
Storrow died at the Plaza Hotel in New York City on March 13, 1926, survived by his wife and son. He was buried at Lincoln Cemetery in Lincoln, Massachusetts, and Helen commissioned a sculpture, Boy and His Dog by Cyrus Dallin, as a memorial to him that was placed close by. She was interred beside him after her death in 1944.

Storrow Drive, a highway that now runs along the Charles River, is named for him, despite his never having advocated such a highway and his wife's vocal opposition to it.

== See also ==
- History of the Boy Scouts of America

== Notes ==
Boy Scouts of America
Preceded by Colin H. Livingstone	National president 1925-1926	Succeeded by Milton A. McRae
