= John F. Fitzgerald =

American politician (1863–1950)

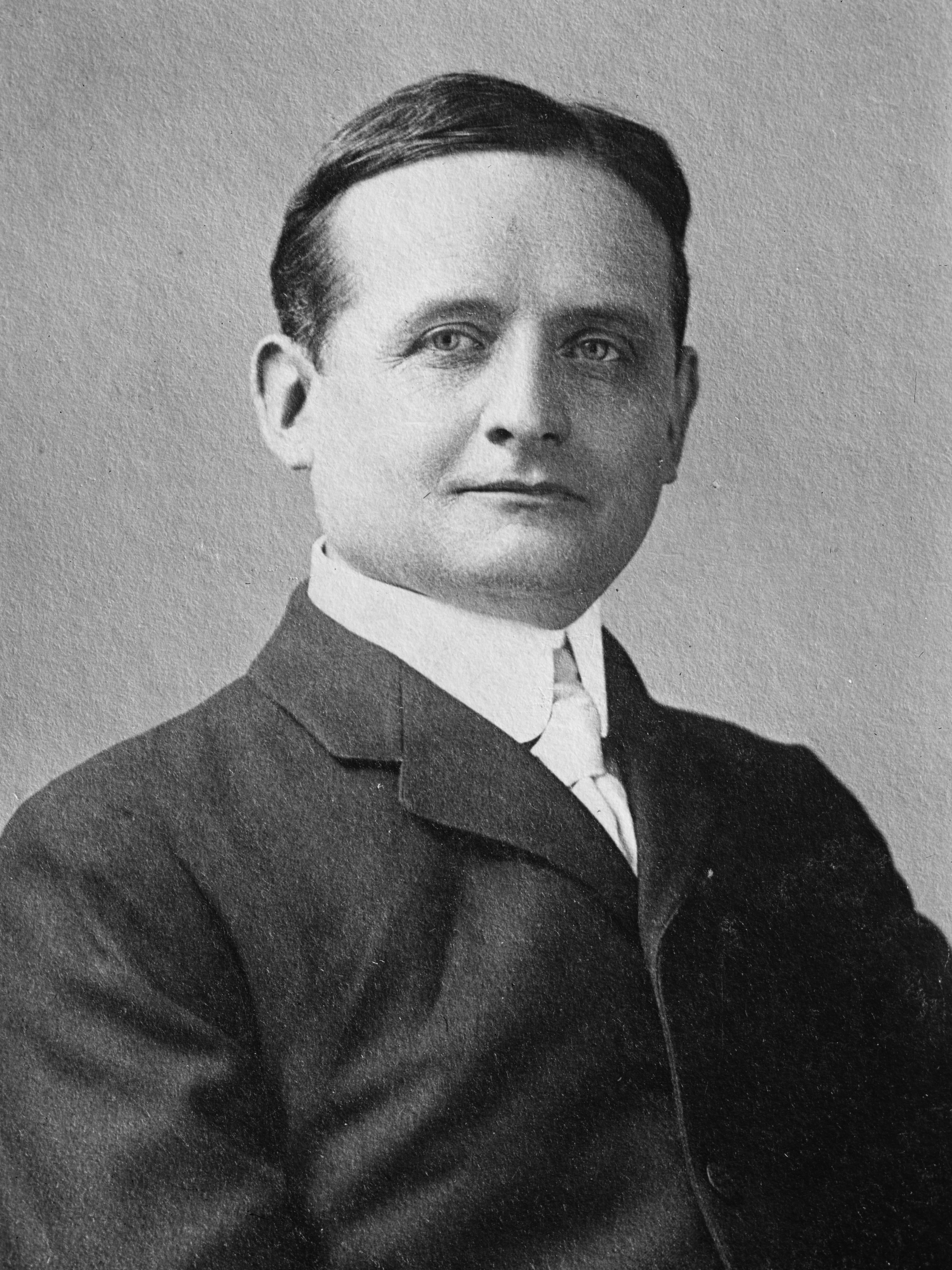
- Fitzgerald in 1900

Mayor of Boston
- In office February 7, 1910 – February 2, 1914
- Preceded by: George A. Hibbard
- Succeeded by: James Michael Curley
- In office January 1, 1906 – January 6, 1908
- Preceded by: Daniel A. Whelton
- Succeeded by: George A. Hibbard

Member of the U.S. House of Representatives from Massachusetts
- In office March 4, 1895 – March 3, 1901
- Preceded by: Joseph H. O'Neil
- Succeeded by: Joseph A. Conry
- Constituency: 9th district
- In office March 4, 1919 – October 23, 1919
- Preceded by: Peter Francis Tague
- Succeeded by: Peter Francis Tague
- Constituency: 10th district

Member of the Massachusetts Senate from the 3rd Suffolk district
- In office 1892–1894

Member of the Boston Common Council from Ward 6
- In office 1891–1892

Personal details
- Born: John Francis Fitzgerald; February 11, 1863 Boston, Massachusetts, U.S.
- Died: October 2, 1950 (aged 87) Boston, Massachusetts, U.S.
- Resting place: St. Joseph Cemetery; West Roxbury, Massachusetts, U.S.
- Party: Democratic
- Spouse: Mary Josephine Hannon (m. 1889)
- Children: 6, including Rose
- Parents: Thomas Fitzgerald; Rosanna Cox
- Education: Boston College; Harvard Medical School

John Francis Fitzgerald (February 11, 1863 – October 2, 1950) was an American Democratic politician from Boston, Massachusetts. Fitzgerald served as mayor of Boston and a member of the United States House of Representatives. He also made unsuccessful runs for the United States Senate in 1916 and 1942 and governor of Massachusetts in 1922. Fitzgerald maintained a high profile in the city whether in or out of office, and his theatrical style of campaigning and charisma earned him the nickname "Honey Fitz".

He was the father of Rose Fitzgerald and maternal grandfather of her sons President John F. Kennedy, Attorney General Robert F. Kennedy, and Senator Ted Kennedy. In his old age, Fitzgerald helped his namesake grandson, John F. Kennedy, win his first election to Congress.

== Early life and education ==
John Francis Fitzgerald was born on February 11, 1863, in the North End of Boston to Irish immigrant businessman and politician Thomas Fitzgerald of Bruff, County Limerick, and Rose Anna Cox of Tonymore, Tomregan, Knockninny, County Fermanagh, Ireland. He was the fourth of twelve children. Both of his sisters, Ellen and Mary, and his eldest brother, Michael, died in infancy. Fitzgerald's brother Joseph had severe brain damage from malaria. Only three of the children survived in good health.

Fitzgerald's mother died when he was sixteen. His father, who had gone into the liquor dealing business, wished for him to become a doctor to help prevent future deaths of the sort that had marred the family. Accordingly, after being educated at Boston Latin School and Boston College, he enrolled at Harvard Medical School for one year, but withdrew following the death of his father in 1885. Fitzgerald later became a clerk at the Customs House in Boston and was active in the local Democratic Party.

== Entry to politics ==
In the 1890s, Fitzgerald founded the Jefferson Club, a political club founded to organize the Irish Catholic voters of South Boston. It was modeled on earlier clubs like Tammany Hall in New York and Martin Lomasney's Hendricks Club in the West End of Boston. Fitzgerald won election to Boston's Common Council in 1891. In 1892, he became a member of the Massachusetts Senate. These early victories came with support from Martin Lomasney.

== United States Representative ==
In 1894, he was elected to Congress for the 9th district, serving from 1895 to 1901. In his first two terms (1895–1899), Fitzgerald was the only Democrat to represent New England in Congress.

In 1901, Fitzgerald was one of three representatives, along with Charles H. Grosvenor and George Henry White, to argue in favor of reducing the size of delegations from Southern states in accordance with the Fourteenth Amendment due to their suppression of voting rights for black people. This measure failed by a vote of 94 to 136.

== Mayor of Boston ==
=== First term (1906–1908) ===
In December 1905, Fitzgerald was elected Mayor of Boston. In the process, he made an enemy of the powerful Lomasney by opposing one of Lomasney's lieutenants, Edward J. Donovan. After Fitzgerald beat Donovan in the mayoral primary, Lomasney endorsed the Republican candidate, Louis Frothingham, and delivered 95% of the vote in his usually Democratic ward to Frothingham. However, the Republican vote was split between Frothingham and judge Henry Dewey, who ran on the Populist ticket after losing the primary. Fitzgerald won despite Lomasney's undermining, though only with a plurality of the vote.

Another opponent of Fitzgerald's during the campaign was P. J. Kennedy, a behind-the-scenes Democratic figure. They later became allies. In 1914, their families were united when P. J.'s son Joseph P. Kennedy Sr. married Fitzgerald's eldest daughter Rose.

Fitzgerald was the first American-born Irish Catholic to be elected mayor.

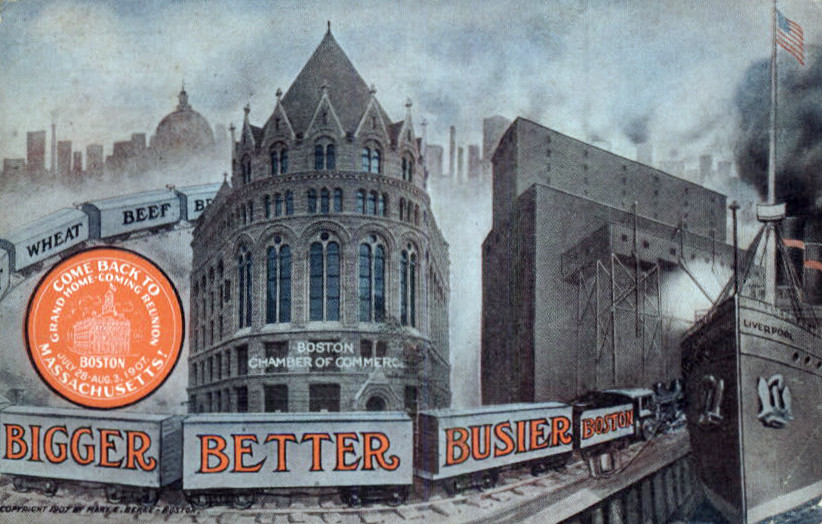
A 1907 advertisement for the "Bigger, Busier and Better Boston" campaign

According to Peter Jones, during his first term as mayor, Fitzgerald demonstrated an unwavering commitment to the city, actively advocating for the development of port and harbor facilities and promoting industrial growth. Under his leadership, the High School of Commerce for boys and the School of Practical Arts for girls were constructed, and he oversaw the establishment of numerous playgrounds, public baths, and other facilities that served large numbers of voters. He also engaged in corrupt practices, manipulating public contracts to create superfluous jobs for poorly credentialed friends. For instance, he appointed a tavern keeper and a bartender to superintendent positions for public buildings and streets, respectively, and his brother Henry managed the patronage department. The mayor's tireless energy was on full display: in two years he attended around 1200 dinners, a thousand meetings, and 1500 dances, maintaining an active presence throughout the city.

He lost the 1907 election in part because his opponent, Republican George A. Hibbard, promised he would "clean up [Fitzgerald's] mess." With control of the city and state Government, Republicans revised the city charter to curb the power of the Irish Democratic ward bosses like Fitzgerald and Lomasney. They eliminated the large common council, replaced the board of aldermen with a nine-seat city council, extending the mayor's term to four years, and making all offices formally non-partisan, removing the advantage of party recognition in the predominantly Democratic city.

=== Second term (1910–1914) ===
In 1910, Fitzgerald ran for mayor again. His campaign was almost scuttled by a bribery scandal involving no-bid contracts with kickbacks during his first term. Fitzgerald escaped prosecution, but made a long-term enemy in Daniel H. Coakley, an Irish lawyer who had defended one of the key figures in the business. In addition to his rivalry with Lomasney, Fitzgerald now also had to contend with the rising star of James Michael Curley of Roxbury, who was kept out of the race by assurances that Fitzgerald would serve only one term. Fitzgerald won a narrow victory over James J. Storrow, a stiff Protestant Republican Boston Brahmin.

Early in his first term as Boston's mayor, Fitzgerald had formulated a plan to revitalize the commercial importance of the city under the banner of "a Bigger, Busier and Better Boston." This plan was not pursued by Hibbard but gained traction after Fitzgerald's return to office. Fitzgerald was able to persuade businesses and the Massachusetts legislature to invest $9 million for improvements to the port by 1912. Within a year, the investments began to pay off in the form of new port traffic to and from Europe.

In 1914, Fitzgerald broke his promise to Curley and attempted to run for a second consecutive term. Curley made common cause with Daniel Coakley, and they secured Fitzgerald's withdrawal by threatening to expose a dalliance he had with a cigarette girl, Elizabeth "Toodles" Ryan—who was only 24, the same age as Fitzgerald's daughter Rose—at a local gambling club. Curley was elected in January 1914 to his first of four terms as Boston mayor.

== Later political career ==
In 1916, Fitzgerald unsuccessfully challenged incumbent United States Senator Henry Cabot Lodge.

Fitzgerald won a close election for the House in 1918, but his opponent Peter F. Tague contested the race. Investigators found evidence of fraud in three precincts and when those precincts were eliminated they found Tague to be the winner. Fitzgerald served from March 4 until October 23, 1919, when the House voted unanimously that Fitzgerald had not won and that Tague had.

In 1922, Fitzgerald unsuccessfully challenged incumbent governor of Massachusetts Channing Cox.

Fitzgerald served on the Port of Boston Authority from 1934-1948 and in 1942 ran a quixotic campaign for the U.S. Senate. He lost the Democratic primary to Congressman Joseph E. Casey. (Daniel Coakley finished a distant fourth.)

== Retirement ==
In his later years, Fitzgerald focused on his business interests and on honing the political instincts of his daughter Rose's promising sons.

In 1930, he ran for governor but withdrew late in the race for the Democratic nomination, citing his health. Despite his withdrawal, Fitzgerald received over 84,000 votes against eventual Governor Joseph B. Ely, as James Michael Curley encouraged Irish Catholic voters to support Fitzgerald in solidarity against the supposedly "anti-Irish" Ely.

In 1932, he campaigned for Franklin Delano Roosevelt for President. He was joined by James Michael Curley. Fitzgerald unsuccessfully tried to recruit Martin Lomasney to the cause as well. After Roosevelt won the election, Fitzgerald's son-in-law Joseph was appointed chairman of the new U.S. Maritime Commission. Joseph would later serve as chairman of the new U.S. Securities and Exchange Commission and as U.S. ambassador to Great Britain.

In 1946, when John Fitzgerald "Jack" Kennedy decided to run for Congress, 83-year-old Honey Fitz helped him plan his campaign strategy. At the victory celebration, Fitzgerald danced an Irish jig, sang "Sweet Adeline," and predicted that his grandson would someday occupy the White House. Shortly after his election to the presidency, President Kennedy renamed the presidential yacht the Honey Fitz in honor of his maternal grandfather.

== Personal life ==
On September 18, 1889, Fitzgerald married his second cousin Mary Josephine "Josie" Hannon (1865–1964). She was a daughter of Michael Hannon and Mary Ann Fitzgerald. John and Mary had six children: Rose (1890–1995), Mary (1892–1936), Thomas (1895–1968), John Jr. (1897–1979), Eunice (1900–1923), and Frederick (1904–1935). They had nineteen grandchildren, including Rose's nine children with Joseph P. Kennedy Sr.

Fitzgerald was a member of the Royal Rooters, an early supporters' club for Boston's baseball teams, particularly its American League team, the modern Boston Red Sox. At one point, he was the group's chairman and threw out the ceremonial opening pitch at Fenway Park's inaugural game on April 20, 1912, as well as in the 1912 World Series later that year. His great-granddaughter Caroline Kennedy threw out the first pitch at Fenway Park's 100th anniversary celebration on April 20, 2012.

== Death ==
On October 2, 1950, Fitzgerald died in Boston at the age of eighty-seven. His funeral was one of the largest in the city's history. President Harry S. Truman sent his sympathies and Fitzgerald's pallbearers included two U.S. Senators (Henry Cabot Lodge Jr. and Leverett Saltonstall) two future U.S. Speakers of the House (John McCormack and Tip O'Neill), and James Michael Curley. As "Honey Fitz" was carried to his final rest from Holy Cross Cathedral to St. Joseph Cemetery in West Roxbury, Massachusetts, a crowd of thousands gathered along the streets and sang "Sweet Adeline."

== Legacy ==
Of his stylish manner, Robert Dallek wrote:

He was a natural politician—a charming, impish, affable lover of people. ... His warmth of character earned him yet another nickname, "Honey Fitz," and he gained a reputation as the only politician who could sing "Sweet Adeline" sober and get away with it. A pixie-like character with florid face, bright eyes, and sandy hair, he was a showman who could have had a career in vaudeville. But politics, with all the brokering that went into arranging alliances and the hoopla that went into campaigning, was his calling. A verse of the day ran: 'Honey Fitz can talk you blind / on any subject you can find / Fish and fishing, motor boats / Railroads, streetcars, getting votes.' His gift of gab became known as Fitzblarney, and his followers as 'dearos,' a shortened version of his description of his district as 'the dear old North End.'

The official name for the Central Artery highway in Boston was "The John F. Fitzgerald Expressway," until it was torn down in the 1990s as part of Boston's "Big Dig" project which eliminated the Central Artery and replaced it with a tunnel. The resulting greenway above the tunnel where the expressway had been was named for Fitzgerald's daughter as the "Rose Fitzgerald Kennedy Greenway."

== See also ==
- Timeline of Boston, 1890s-1910s
- 114th Massachusetts General Court (1893)

== Works cited ==
- Sherman, Richard (1973). The Republican Party and Black America From McKinley to Hoover 1896-1933. University of Virginia Press. ISBN 0813904676.

== Print sources and further reading ==
- O'Connor, Thomas H. (1995). The Boston Irish: A Political History. Boston: Northeastern University Press. ISBN 9781555532208.
- O'Neill, Gerard (2012). Rogues and Redeemers. New York: Crown Publisher. ISBN 9780307405364.
- Van Nostrand, Albert D. (December 1948). "The Lomasney Legend". The New England Quarterly. 21 (4): 435–458. doi:10.2307/361565. JSTOR 361565.
- Holli, Melvin G., and Peter d'A. Jones, eds. Biographical dictionary of American mayors, 1820-1980 (Greenwood Press, 1981), p. 116-117.

Party political offices
First	Democratic nominee for U.S. Senator from Massachusetts (Class 1); 1916	Succeeded by William A. Gaston
Preceded by John Jackson Walsh	Democratic nominee for Governor of Massachusetts; 1922	Succeeded by James Michael Curley
Political offices
Preceded by Joseph H. O'Neil	Member of the U.S. House of Representatives from Massachusetts's 9th congressional district March 4, 1895 – March 4, 1901	Succeeded by Joseph A. Conry
Preceded by Daniel A. Whelton	Mayor of Boston, Massachusetts; 1906–1908	Succeeded by George A. Hibbard
Preceded by George A. Hibbard	Mayor of Boston, Massachusetts; 1910–1914	Succeeded by James Michael Curley
Preceded by Peter F. Tague	Member of the U.S. House of Representatives from Massachusetts's 10th congressional district March 4, 1919 – October 23, 1919	Succeeded by Peter F. Tague
