= Bechtel (surname) =

Bechtel is a German surname.

== People ==
Notable people with this surname include the following:

- Amy Wroe Bechtel (born 1972), American woman who has been missing since 1997
- Bruce Bechtel (born 1955), American race-car driver
- Gabriella Leigh Bechtel (born 1997), known professionally as Gabbriette, American model and musician
- Jim Bechtel (born 1952), American cotton farmer and poker player
- Kenneth K. Bechtel (1904–1978), American industrialist, son of Warren Bechtel
- Louise Seaman Bechtel (1894–1985), American author, editor, and critic
- Riley P. Bechtel (born 1952), American industrialist, chairman and CEO of the Bechtel Corporation, great-grandson of Warren Bechtel
- Stephen Bechtel Jr. (1925–2021), co-owner of the Bechtel Corporation, grandson of Warren Bechtel
- Stephen Bechtel Sr. (1900–1989), American industrialist, president of the Bechtel Corporation and son of Warren Bechtel
- Warren A. Bechtel (1872–1933), American industrialist, founder of the Bechtel Corporation
- William Bechtel (contemporary), American professor of philosophy

== Companies ==
- Bechtel, an American company founded by Warren A. Bechtel (see above)

== See also ==
- Bechdel
- Bechtle
