= Brendan Bechtel =

American business executive (born 1981)

- Brendan in 2023
- Born: Brendan Peters Bechtel; 1981 (age 44–45)
- Education: Middlebury College (BS); Stanford University (MS, MBA)
- Occupations: Chair and CEO of Bechtel
- Organization: Business Roundtable (board member)
- Father: Riley P. Bechtel
- Relatives: Warren A. Bechtel (great-great-grandfather); Stephen Bechtel Sr. (great-grandfather); Stephen Bechtel Jr. (grandfather)

Brendan Peters Bechtel (born 1981) is an American businessman who is the chairman and chief executive officer of Bechtel, the second largest construction company in the United States, which has operations in 160 countries. The great-great-grandson of founder Warren A. Bechtel, he became CEO at the age of 35, and is the fifth generation of the Bechtel family to lead the privately owned company since 1898. Bechtel chairs the infrastructure committee of the Business Roundtable, a lobbying group representing CEOs of some of the largest companies in the country.

== Early life and education ==
Brendan is the son of Riley P. Bechtel and the eldest of three children. At the age of three, he lived with his family in a trailer at a Bechtel construction site in Borneo. He first worked at Bechtel as a paid summer intern when he was 14, the minimum legal working age in California, in the corporate IT group. One of his first jobs was to install security cables for laptops at the company headquarters in San Francisco.

In 2003, he graduated from Middlebury College with a Bachelor of Arts degree in geography. According to company rules, as a Bechtel family member, he was not allowed to join Bechtel until he had worked somewhere else full-time for at least two years after college. After working for the nonprofit Conservation Fund, he pursued his post-graduate studies at Stanford University, earning both a Master of Business Administration degree and a Master of Science in Engineering degree with a focus on construction engineering and construction management.

== Career ==
Starting in 2010, Brendan followed a career path within the Bechtel Group designed by the board of directors to test his abilities as a potential future CEO, taking on increasing responsibility in field construction, project management, and executive leadership. One of the megaprojects he helped to manage was the Dulles Corridor Metrorail, the only project he ever "overlapped on" with his sister Katherine, who also works for the company. Before that, he had worked on other Bechtel projects, including the San Onofre Nuclear Generating Station in California.

From 2012 to 2013, he oversaw the construction of a $10 billion liquefied natural gas plant on Curtis Island in Queensland, Australia, living part-time in a workers' camp. Following that assignment, he led Bechtel's largest business, Bechtel Oil, Gas & Chemicals. From 2014 to 2016, he served as president and chief operating officer.

Brendan became CEO of Bechtel Group in September 2016, succeeding Bill Dudley. Dudley had been appointed CEO in late 2013, when Riley Bechtel stepped down as CEO four years earlier than planned, after being diagnosed with Parkinson's disease. At the age of 35, Brendan became the second youngest CEO in the history of the company since it was founded by Warren Bechtel in 1898; the youngest was his great-grandfather, Stephen Bechtel Sr.

In April 2017, Brendan was elected chairman of Bechtel Group by the company's board of directors, succeeding Riley Bechtel. Since then, Brendan Bechtel has held the dual titles of chairman and CEO.

When the company announced that it was moving its headquarters from San Francisco to Reston, Virginia, at the end of 2018, The Washington Post noted that Brendan Bechtel was already based in the Reston office, with 1,300 employees. In an interview that year with the Washington Business Journal, he stated that he had no interest in taking the company public, preferring instead to retain more control and focus on profitability without the pressure to achieve "growth for growth's sake".

=== Recognition ===
Before taking over as CEO, Brendan was featured in Fortune magazine, as part of an effort to rebuild the company's image and recruit talent. It was the first time in 30 years that senior executives at Bechtel Group had agreed to in-depth media interviews. In October 2016, he was named in Fortune magazine's annual "40 Under 40" list.

In 2020, the company experienced what Bechtel called "the toughest year in our company's history" and was overtaken by Turner Construction as the No. 1 contractor in the United States on ENR's Top 400 Contractors List for the first time since 1999, following a decline in revenue across nearly all market sectors.

== Board memberships ==
Brendan Bechtel is on the board of directors of the Business Roundtable and is the chair of its infrastructure committee. He has served as a trustee of the National Geographical Society and the Center for Strategic and International Studies for several years. He is also on the board of advisers for the Fremont Group, the private investment office for the Bechtel family, which invests in real estate and venture capital.

More recently, he joined the board of two regional business groups, including the Federal City Council and The Economic Club of Washington, D.C.

== Issues advocacy ==
A strong supporter of nuclear energy, Brendan Bechtel has stated that he believes it is the only long term alternative to fossil fuels. He has also been an advocate for the use of public–private partnerships to rebuild America's deteriorating infrastructure. In 2016, he spoke at the Construction Industry Institute conference, warning that massive cost overruns and delays in megaprojects were threatening the future of the industry.

=== Lobbying ===
According to ProPublica, Brendan Bechtel was able to write off $64 million in taxes in 2018, due to a last-minute change in the wording of the Tax Cuts and Jobs Act of 2017, which allowed private engineering companies to benefit from pass-through deductions. In April 2020, he was named to President Donald Trump's panel of advisers on economic recovery from the global coronavirus pandemic.

In 2021, he was vocal in opposing President Joe Biden's proposed corporate tax hikes to pay for new public infrastructure. Speaking on behalf of the Business Roundtable, he said that he and other business leaders were in discussions with the Biden administration and with members of Congress, advocating alternative ways to pay for new infrastructure, including user fees, deficit financing, and public-private partnerships.

== Personal life ==
Brendan Bechtel married one month before leaving for Australia to work on the Queensland Curtis LNG project in early 2012. He currently lives in the Washington, D.C. area with his wife, "a third-generation Washingtonian", and their children, and was inducted into the exclusive Alfalfa Club as a new "sprout" in 2017. When taking time off, he enjoys skiing and fishing in California and the Rocky Mountains.
