= Bechdel (disambiguation) =

Bechdel may refer to:

- Alison Bechdel (born 1960), American cartoonist, known for the comic strip Dykes To Watch Out For
- Bechdel test, used to identify gender bias in fiction

== See also ==
- Bechtel, the largest engineering company in the United States
- Bechtel (surname)
