= Stephen Bechtel Jr. =

American businessman (1925–2021)

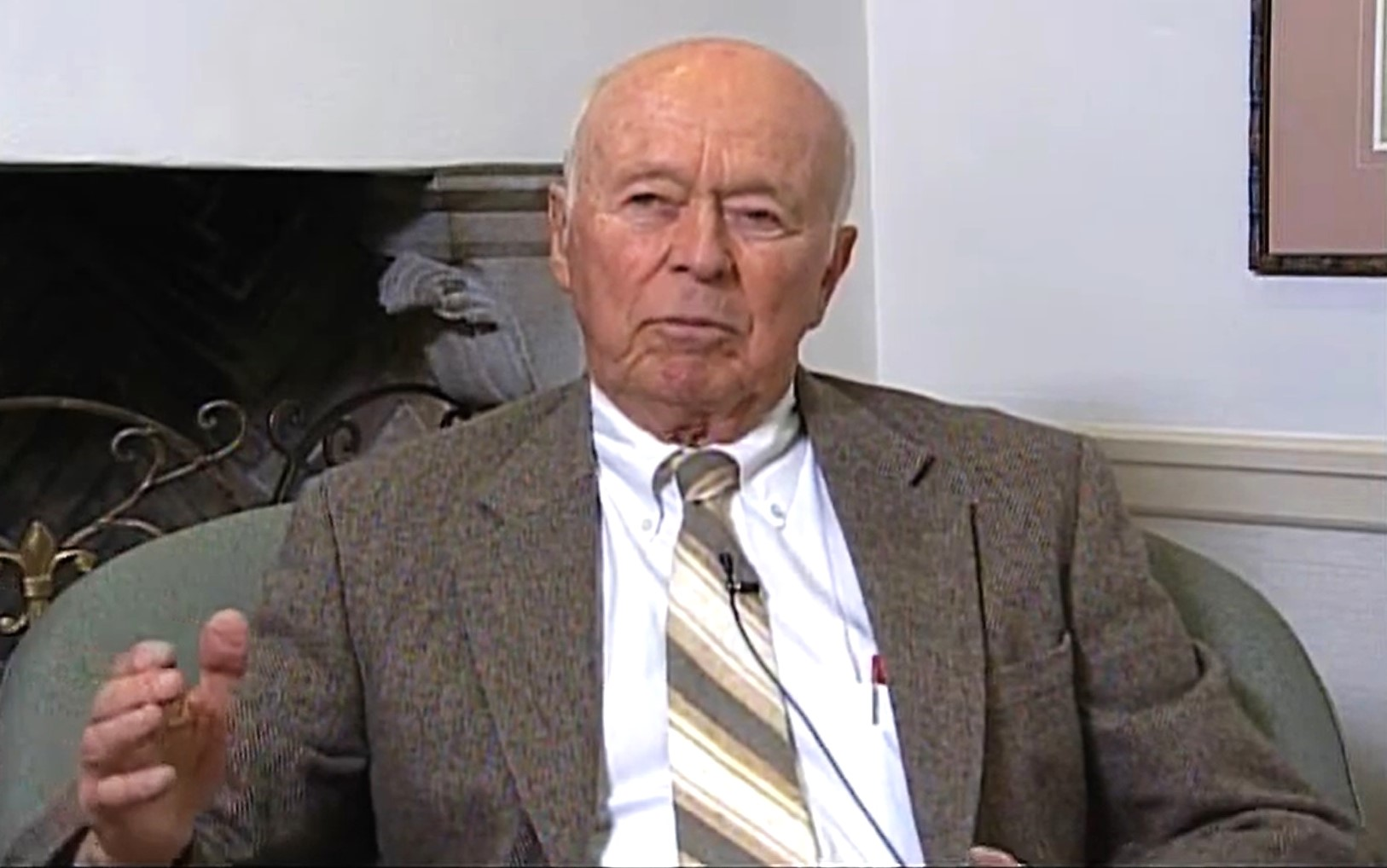
- Bechtel in 2010
- Born: Stephen Davison Bechtel Jr. May 10, 1925; Oakland, California, U.S.
- Died: March 15, 2021 (aged 95); San Francisco, California, U.S.
- Education: Purdue University (BS); Stanford University (MBA)
- Occupation: Businessman
- Spouse: Elizabeth Mead Hogan
- Children: 5, including Riley
- Parent: Stephen Bechtel Sr.
- Relatives: Warren A. Bechtel (grandfather)

Stephen Davison Bechtel Jr. (May 10, 1925 – March 15, 2021) was an American billionaire businessman, civil engineer, and co-owner of the Bechtel Corporation. He was the son of Stephen Davison Bechtel Sr. and grandson of Warren A. Bechtel, who founded the Bechtel Corporation. He was known for expanding the global footprint of the corporation through several of its international projects. Some of the projects executed under his leadership of the company included King Khalid International Airport in Riyadh as well as Jubail Industrial City in Saudi Arabia as well as oil platforms in the North Sea, liquefied natural gas plants in Algeria, Indonesia and the United Arab Emirates.

Bechtel also served on the board of General Motors and International Business Machines. He had a bachelor's degree from the Purdue University and a master's degree from the Stanford Graduate School of Business.

At the time of his death, he had a net worth of nearly US$3 billion according to Forbes.

== Early life and education ==
Bechtel was born in Oakland, California, on May 10, 1925. He was the son of Laura A. Peart and Stephen Bechtel Sr., and the grandson of Warren A. Bechtel, the founder of American construction and civil engineering firm Bechtel Corporation. During his time in high school, he enlisted in Marine Corps Reserve, and went to University of Colorado to study engineering. In 1946, he graduated from Purdue University with a Bachelor of Science degree in civil engineering, where he was a member of Beta Theta Pi, and married Elizabeth "Betty" Mead Hogan, a Berkeley alumna. He earned his Master of Business Administration degree from the Stanford Graduate School of Business in 1948.

== Career ==
Bechtel joined the family business in 1948. While he initially wanted to enter into home building, he was convinced by his father by showcasing Bechtel Corporation's global projects in a three-week trip. He succeeded his father, Stephen Bechtel Sr., as president of Bechtel Corporation in 1960 and chairman in 1969. His career with the company spanned 30 years until his retirement in 1990. During his time, the company which was earlier known for its work on the Hoover Dam and the Bay Area Rapid Transit, expanded its global footprint by working on the Channel Tunnel between France and the United Kingdom, King Khalid International Airport in Riyadh as well as Jubail Industrial City in Saudi Arabia. The last is considered one of the largest civil engineering projects of the time. The company was involved in the build out of oil platforms in the North Sea, liquefied natural gas plants in Algeria, Indonesia and the United Arab Emirates, and also in the cleanup of the nuclear reactor site Three Mile Island in Pennsylvania.

The company's role in Boston's infrastructure projects, titled Big Dig, in the 1990s came into scrutiny, with the company having to pay to settle litigation over a ceiling collapse and leaky tunnels. Earlier, the company had been charged by the US Justice Department in 1976 of illegally complying with the Arab League boycott of Israel, and had also faced criticism for undertaking projects in Saddam Hussein's Iraq of the 1980s. During his leadership, the 1980s oil glut and the resulting plunge in oil prices resulted in reduced spend by the middle-eastern countries on infrastructure projects including petroleum pipelines, resulting in a significant impact to the company's business. In addition to retrenchments of about half of its 44,000 member large workforce, the company under Bechtel's leadership undertook financial engineering actions including taking part ownership in some of the infrastructure projects.

During his time the company, over three decades, the company's revenues grew eleven-fold, and the company also pivoted from majority ownership residing within the family to a model that had majority ownership by managers outside of the family. He held 20 percent of the company shares and his net worth in 2021 was estimated by Forbes to be $2.9 billion. After his retirement from Bechtel Corporation, he headed the real estate company Fremont Group, which was also an early investor in Starbucks Corporation. He had also served as director on the board of General Motors and International Business Machines.

=== Political appointments ===
Lyndon B. Johnson appointed Bechtel to the President's Committee on Urban Housing. Richard Nixon named him to membership on the National Industrial Pollution Control Council, the National Commission on Productivity, the Labor Management Advisory Committee, and the National Commission for Industrial Peace. Gerald Ford asked Bechtel to serve on the President's Labor-Management Committee.

=== Boy Scouts ===
Bechtel became an Eagle Scout in 1940 and has been recognized by the Boy Scouts of America with both the Distinguished Eagle Scout Award and the Silver Buffalo Award. Stephen's uncle Kenneth K. Bechtel was awarded the Silver Buffalo in 1950 and served as national president of the Boy Scouts of America from 1956 to 1959.

The BSA acquired new property near Beckley, West Virginia, for a new high adventure base in 2009. Bechtel donated $50 million towards the new base, which has been named The Summit Bechtel Family National Scout Reserve.

=== Philanthropy ===
Bechtel was a contributor to many environmental causes. He created a foundation in 1957 to support these cases. The foundation contributed $50 million to create a National Scout Reserve in southern West Virginia, which is now the home of the national boy scout jamboree. The foundation contributed $25 million to renovate the Presidio of San Francisco. The S. D. Bechtel Jr. Foundation and the Stephen Bechtel Fund support many non-profit groups, especially in the San Francisco Bay area. Stephen and Betty's largess also extended to Berkeley's International House, Mills College, Achievement Rewards for College Scientists, the San Francisco Symphony, the San Francisco Ballet, the Head Royce School, the Fine Arts Museums of San Francisco, the Royal Horticultural Society, the American Friends of the Royal Academy Trust, the Nature Conservancy, the Royal Oak Foundation, the Huntington Library, and the National Trust for Historic Preservation.

== Awards and honors ==
Bechtel was elected a Fellow of the American Academy of Arts and Sciences in 1990. He is the 1980 recipient of the Hoover Medal, which commemorates the civic and humanitarian achievements of engineers. In 1990, he was elevated to National Honor Member by Chi Epsilon, the national civil engineering honor society. In 1998, he and his son Riley were presented with the Honor Award from the National Building Museum for their company's contributions to the built environment. Bechtel received the Award of Excellence from Engineering News-Record for his leadership of Bechtel Corporation.

He received the National Medal of Technology and Innovation in 1991, from the then US President, George H. W. Bush.

== Personal life ==
Bechtel and his wife, Betty, had two sons and three daughters. One son, Riley Bechtel, succeeded him as the chairman and chief executive of the Bechtel Corporation. He was a nature enthusiast and hiker who had once made the trek to the Everest base camp and had also hiked the John Muir Trail over a 211-mile course.

Bechtel died on March 15, 2021, at his home in San Francisco, California. He was aged 95.

== Books ==
- McCartney, Laton (1989). Friends in high places: the Bechtel story: the most secret corporation and how it engineered the world. Ballantine Books. ISBN 0-345-36044-3. OCLC 19642636.

== See also ==
- List of billionaires
