= Riley P. Bechtel =

American billionaire heir and businessman

- Born: Riley Peart Bechtel; March 25, 1952 (age 74); Alameda County, California, U.S.
- Education: University of California, Davis (BA); Stanford University (JD, MBA)
- Occupation: Businessman
- Title: Former chairman, Bechtel Corporation
- Spouse: Susan Bechtel
- Children: 3, including Brendan
- Parent: Stephen Bechtel Jr.

Riley Peart Bechtel CBE (born March 25, 1952) is an American billionaire heir and businessman. He was the chairman of the Bechtel Corporation until April 2017. As of July 2021, his estimated net worth is US$2.7 billion.

== Early life and education ==
He is the great-grandson of Warren A. Bechtel, the company's founder. His parents were Elizabeth Hogan and Stephen Bechtel Jr., who was the former chairman and CEO of the company.

He attended The Thacher School, a boarding school. He received a bachelor's degree in political science and psychology from the University of California, Davis, and a JD/MBA from Stanford University in 1977. He was admitted to the State Bar of California in November 1979 and joined the American Bar Association.

== Career ==
He worked for the law firm of Thelen, Marrin, Johnson & Bridges. He joined Bechtel full-time in 1981 and was elected president and chief operating officer in March 1989. He became CEO in June 1990. In January 1996, he also became chairman of Bechtel.

He sits on the board of directors of the international council of J.P. Morgan Chase & Co. (since 1995), the Fremont Group (owned by Bechtel Corporation), the Fremont Group (which in turn runs Trinity Ventures, LP), Fremont Investors, Inc. (owned by Bechtel Corporation), and Sequoia Ventures, Inc. (limited partner of Bechtel Corporation). He was a board member of Theranos.

He is a former member of the Trilateral Commission, the American Society of Corporate Executives, The Business Council, the Business Roundtable, and the National Petroleum Council. He sits on the corporate council of the Conservation Fund and the Board of Trustees of the Ocean Exploration Trust. He also sits on the governing board of the Indian School of Business, Stanford Graduate School of Business advisory council, Stanford Law School Dean's advisory council, and UC Davis' board of visitors. He was appointed to the President's Export Council by George W. Bush. In 1998, he and his father were presented with the Honor Award from the National Building Museum for their company's contributions to America's built environment. He was elected a Fellow of the American Academy of Arts and Sciences in 2001. He is also an Honorary Fellow of the American Society of Civil Engineers and an Honorary Lifetime member of the American Society of Safety Engineers.

== Wealth ==
According to Forbes, his estimated net worth is US$3 billion, as of October 2021.

== Personal life ==
He resides in California with his wife, Susan. He is a member of the Augusta National Golf Club as well as the all-male Bohemian Club in San Francisco and attends its annual encampment, the Bohemian Grove. He is consistently ranked in the top 200 richest people in the US and the top 500 richest people in the world by Forbes magazine. In February 2014, Bechtel announced that, after 25 years, he was stepping down as CEO of Bechtel Corporation because of health reasons associated with Parkinson's disease.
