= Bantrel Co. =

Canadian private corporation

Bantrel Company

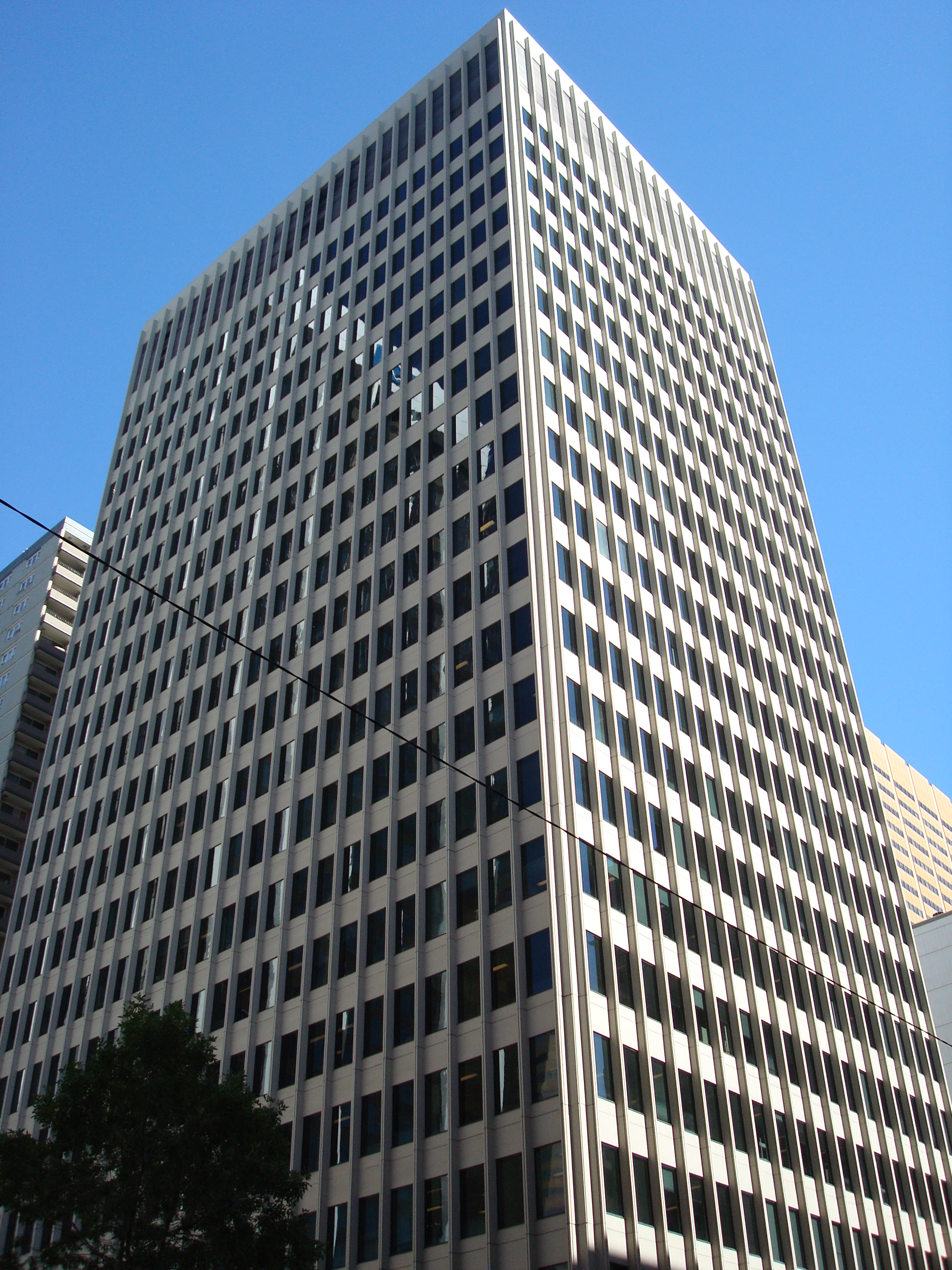
- Bantrel Headquarters in Calgary
- Company type: Subsidiary
- Industry: EPC firm with focus in the oil, gas and chemical industry
- Founded: 1983; 43 years ago, in Canada
- Headquarters: Calgary, Alberta
- Number of employees: 1,500 (2011)
- Parent: Bechtel
- Website: http://www.bantrel.com

Bantrel Co. is a Canadian private corporation owned by Bechtel Corporation and McCaig Investments. Bantrel's core business is in Engineering, Procurement, and Construction Management in the Canadian Marketplace. Bantrel is active in Canada's energy sector, and is a supplier of engineering services to oil sands developers in Alberta. In addition to oil sands, Bantrel is also engaged in refining, power generation, gasification, and pipeline construction projects.

Bantrel was established in 1983 and is currently one of Canada's largest EPC firms. As of 2006, 2,611 people were employed by Bantrel. Headquartered in Calgary, AB, Bantrel also has offices in Edmonton, AB and Toronto, ON.

Bantrel's wholly owned subsidiary company, Bantrel Constructors Co., is a self-executing construction company, focusing on large industrial projects. Bantrel Management Services Co. is Bantrel's sister company, which provides construction management oversight and expertise.

== History ==
=== Oil Sands ===
Bantrel's parent company, Bechtel Corporation, was involved in oil sands development early. Bechtel designed and constructed the Great Canadian Oil Sands upgrader in 1962, which is now Suncor Energy. Bechtel also developed Syncrude's upgrading facilities.

Bechtel transferred the oil sands portfolio to Bantrel in 1983.

== Past Projects ==
- Husky Bi-Provincial Upgrader
- Newfoundland Transshipment Terminal
- Nova Chemicals Ethylene and Polyethylene Complex
- Encana Foster Creek Cogeneration
- Suncor Millenium
- Petro-Canada Edmonton Diesel Desulphurization
- Suncor Genesis
- Petro-Canada Refinery Conversion
- Suncor Voyageur Upgrader
- Reliance Jamnagar Refinery
- Shell Scotford Upgrader Expansion 1
