= Jude Laspa =

American businessman (1943-2023)

Jude Laspa (October 10, 1943 – December 29, 2023) was an American vice president and director of the Bechtel Group.

== Biography ==
Laspa obtained his bachelor's degree in engineering from the Harvey Mudd College and later got his Master of Business Administration degree from the University of Chicago. He was in charge of both the Exploratorium and the Rainbird Corporation. By 2010, he retired as vice-chair of the board of trustees of Harvey Mudd College and the same year was retired from Bechtel where he had served for 43 years. His career there ranged from being a sponsor of fellows to being the president of Bechtel Systems and Infrastructure. He was a chairman of BGI Group Strategy Committee, and served as both a manager and senior vice-president of the company's fossil-power business.
