= Mechanics Building (UC Berkeley) =

Building at U.C. Berkeley

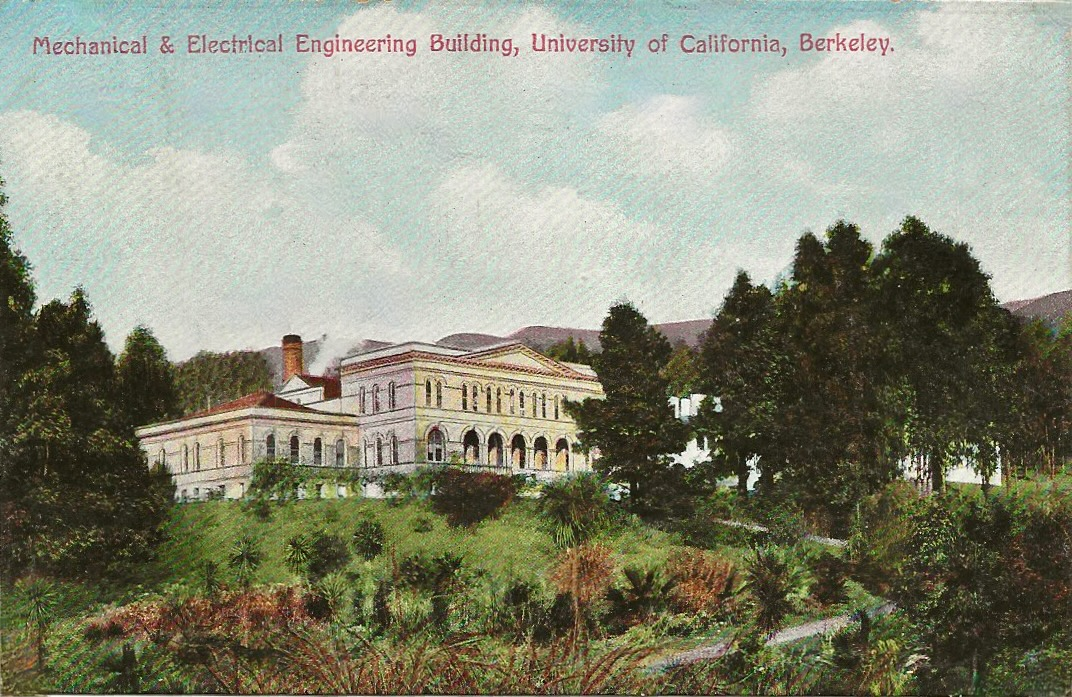
- Mechanical and Electrical Engineering Building (1909)
- Interactive map of the Mechanics Building area

General information
- Location: Berkeley, California, United States
- Coordinates: 37°52′28″N 122°15′55″W
- Construction started: 1892
- Completed: 1893
- Demolished: 1965
- Cost: $63,000
- Owner: University of California, Berkeley

Technical details
- Floor count: 2

Design and construction
- Architect: William F. Curlett

Mechanics Building, also known as Mechanical and Electrical Engineering Building, was a historic building on the campus of the University of California, Berkeley in Berkeley, California. Over the years, this brick academic structure was known by various names, reflecting the evolving focus and development of engineering disciplines. The Mechanical and Electrical Engineering Building was demolished in 1965 to provide space for the Davis Hall and the Bechtel Engineering Center.

== History ==
=== Origins and Early Construction ===
In 1892, the University of California, Berkeley initiated the construction of a new academic building to accommodate the burgeoning disciplines of mechanical and electrical engineering. The project, initially named the "Mechanical and Electrical Engineering Building," was entrusted to architect William F. Curlett, a notable figure from San Francisco. The plans for the structure envisioned a facility that would serve as a hub for innovative research, education, and practical application of engineering principles.

=== The Mechanics Building Era (1893-1931) ===
Upon its completion in 1893, the building was officially named the "Mechanics Building." During this period, it became the focal point for engineering studies at UC Berkeley. The name change to the "Mechanics Building" is indicative of a broader scope, suggesting that the building catered not only to mechanical and electrical engineering but also encompassed other engineering disciplines. The Mechanics Building stood as a testament to the university's commitment to technological advancements and the pursuit of knowledge in the engineering field.

=== Return to the Mechanical and Electrical Engineering Building (1931-1965) ===
In 1931, the building underwent another name change, reverting to its original designation as the "Mechanical and Electrical Engineering Building." This shift in nomenclature emphasized a renewed emphasis on the mechanical and electrical engineering disciplines, aligning the building's name with its primary function. The structure continued to support groundbreaking research, house cutting-edge laboratories, and provide state-of-the-art educational facilities for engineering students.

=== Architectural Significance and Funding ===
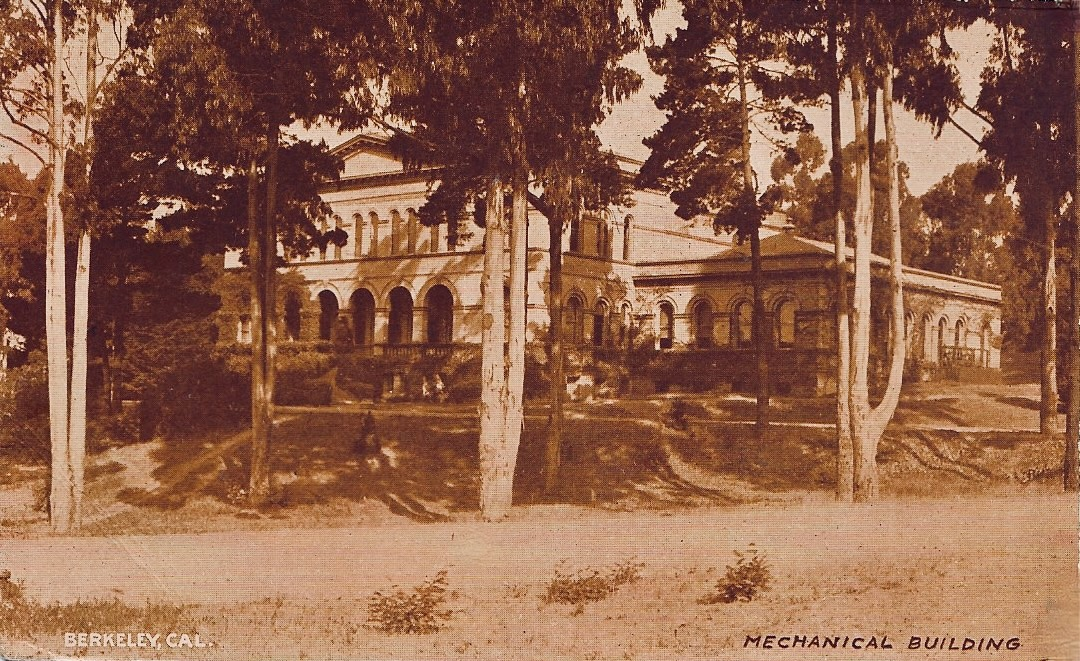
Mechanical Building, Berkeley (1909)

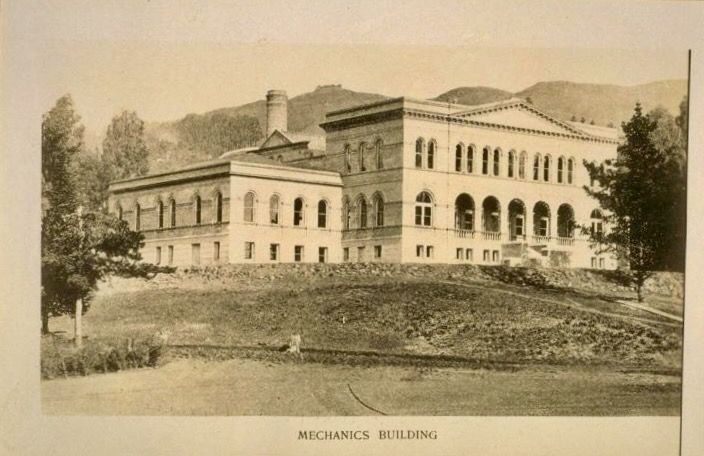
Mechanics Building at U. C. Berkeley

Architect William Curlett's involvement in the project adds further significance to the Mechanics Building's history. Curlett, renowned for his contributions to San Francisco's architectural landscape, crafted a design that blended functionality and aesthetic appeal. His vision provided an inspiring environment for students, faculty, and researchers alike. The construction cost of $63,000 (equivalent to $2,257,500 in 2025) was funded by the University of California, Berkeley itself, highlighting the institution's commitment to investing in its engineering programs and infrastructure.

The Mechanics building contained the laboratories of steam engineering, gas engineering, hydraulic engineering, and electrical engineering. The Mechanical laboratories included a machine shop with a floor area of about 4,000 square feet (370 m^{2}), laboratories for experimentation with a floor area of 5,000 square feet (460 m^{2}), and a covered court with an area of 6,300 square feet (590 m^{2}). Machines were of different capacities and a testing room contained machines for tension, compression, and teorsioin of different capacities.

Photographs of the Mechanical and Electrical Engineering Building are held at the University of California, Berkeley's Bancroft Library, 1893-1965. 75 items: UARC PIC 10U University Archives.

A 1931 accident occurred at the UC Mechanical Engineering Building during construction of a new concrete roof slab. Two men were killed, ten were injured due to possible malfunctions of the bracing and/or the shores supporting the slab.

=== Demolition ===
The Mechanical and Electrical Engineering Building was demolished in 1965 to provide space for Raymond E. Davis Hall, designed by Skidmore, Owings & Merrill's San Francisco Office, completed in 1968. Davis Hall has housed the Department of Civil and Environmental Engineering since 1968. The Stephen D. Bechtel Engineering Center, south of Davis Hall, also replaced the Mechanics Building site.
