= Dump leaching =

Industrial process to extract precious metals and copper from ores

Dump leaching is an industrial process to extract precious metals and copper from ores.

Dump leaching is similar to heap leaching, however in the case of dump leaching ore is taken directly from the mine and stacked on the leach pad without crushing where, in the case of gold and silver, the dump is irrigated with a dilute cyanide solution that percolates through the ore to dissolve gold and silver. The solution containing gold and silver exits the base of the dump, is collected and precious metals extracted. The resultant barren solution is recharged with additional cyanide and returned to the dump.

This method of leaching is usually suitable for low grade ores because it is very low cost. However, it operates with slow kinetics and may take up about 1 to 2 years to extract 50% of the desired mineral.
