= Bechtel =

American construction and civil engineering company

Bechtel Corporation
- Type: Private
- Industry: Engineering and construction
- Founded: 1898; 128 years ago
- Founder: Warren A. Bechtel
- Headquarters: Reston, Virginia, United States
- Area served: Worldwide
- Key people: Brendan Bechtel (chair & CEO); Craig Albert (president & COO)
- Revenue: ▲$58.2 billion (2024)
- Owner: Bechtel family
- Divisions: Energy; Infrastructure; Manufacturing & Technology; Mining & Metals; Nuclear, Security & Environmental
- Subsidiaries: Bantrel Co.; Bechtel Jacobs; Bettis Atomic Power Laboratory; Consolidated Nuclear Security; Tube Lines
- Website: bechtel.com

Bechtel Corporation (/ˈbɛktəl/) is an American company providing engineering, procurement, construction (EPC) and project management services and founded in San Francisco, California, in 1898. It is headquartered in Reston, Virginia, in the Washington metropolitan area. As of 2022, the Engineering News-Record ranked Bechtel as the second largest construction company in the United States, following Turner Construction. Bechtel has over 50,000 employees as of May 2025.

== History ==
=== Founding and early years ===
Bechtel's business activities began in 1898, when cattle farmer Warren A. Bechtel moved from Peabody, Kansas, to the Oklahoma Territory to construct railroads with his team of mules. Bechtel moved his family frequently between construction sites around the Western United States for the next several years, eventually moving to Oakland, California, in 1904, where he worked as the superintendent on the Western Pacific Railroad. In 1906, W. A. Bechtel won his first subcontract to build part of the Oroville-to-Oakland section of the Western Pacific Railroad. That year he bought a steam shovel, becoming a pioneer of the new technology. He painted "W.A. Bechtel Co." on the side of the steam shovel, effectively establishing Bechtel as a company, although it was not yet incorporated. Bechtel completed work on a series of railroad contracts during the early 1900s, culminating in an extension of the Northwestern Pacific Railroad finished in 1914.

Starting with the construction of Klamath River Highway in California in 1919, Bechtel ventured into jobs other than building railroads. The company built roads, bridges, and highways throughout the western United States. The company worked on its first hydroelectric projects in the 1920s for Pacific Gas and Electric Company in California.

In 1925, Warren, his sons Warren A. Bechtel Jr, Stephen, Kenneth (Ken), and his brother Arthur (Art) joined him to incorporate as W.A. Bechtel Company, which by this time was the leading construction company in the western United States. In 1929, Warren's son, Stephen, urged his father to embark on the company's first pipeline project. Bechtel began working with California Standard Oil Company to build pipelines and refineries.

In January 1931, Bechtel joined other contractors in the west to form Six Companies, Inc., a consortium created to bid for a contract from the U.S. government to construct the Hoover Dam. Six Companies won the bid in March and construction began in the summer of 1931.

=== WWII, overseas expansion and the nuclear age ===
Warren Bechtel died unexpectedly in 1933 while in Moscow on business. He was succeeded by his oldest son, Warren A. Bechtel Jr., first, then later Stephen Bechtel Sr., who became both the head of Bechtel and chief executive of the Hoover Dam project. Under his leadership, the Hoover Dam was finished in 1935. The project was the largest of its kind in U.S. history at the time and Bechtel's first megaproject.

During World War II, the United States Maritime Commission invited the company to bid for a contract to build half of their order of 60 cargo ships. The company had no prior experience in shipbuilding, but bid for the entire 60 ships. Between 1941 and 1945, Bechtel's wartime shipyards, including Marinship and Calship, built 560 vessels. Bechtel also worked on a pipeline from the Yukon to Alaska called Canol for the United States Department of War during this period.

Under Stephen Bechtel Sr., the company diversified its projects and expanded its work into other countries. The company also focused on turnkey projects, a concept Stephen Bechtel Sr. pioneered, in which Bechtel handled a project from planning and design through construction.

Bechtel's first job outside the U.S. was building the Mene Grande pipeline in Venezuela in 1940. In 1947, Bechtel began construction on what was then the world's longest oil pipeline, the Trans-Arabian Pipeline, which began in Saudi Arabia, ran across Jordan and Syria, and ended in Lebanon, followed by the Kirkuk–Baniyas pipeline from Kirkuk, also to the Mediterranean. The company continued to expand globally throughout the 1940s, particularly in the Middle East.

In 1949, Bechtel began working with nuclear power after being contracted to build the Experimental Breeder Reactor I in Idaho. The company later built the United States' first privately financed commercial nuclear power plant, the Dresden Generating Station, for Commonwealth Edison in Illinois in 1957.

Other major projects in the 1950s included the Trans Mountain Pipeline in 1952, an oil pipeline in Canada, and a preliminary study for the English Channel in 1959. Bechtel also began engineering work on the Bay Area Rapid Transit (BART) system in 1959.

=== Megaprojects era ===
Stephen D. Bechtel Jr. took over for his father as president of the company as Stephen Bechtel Sr. retired in 1960. During the 1960s and 1970s, Bechtel was involved in constructing 40% of the nuclear plants in the United States. In 1968, the company completed the largest nuclear plant in the U.S. at the time, the San Onofre Nuclear Generating Station, in California. In 1972, Bechtel was involved in approximately 20% of all of the United States' new power-generating capacity. By the end of the decade, the company had moved from nuclear power construction toward nuclear cleanup projects, including Three Mile Island in 1979.

Bechtel completed work on other megaprojects during the 1970s, including major airports in Saudi Arabia and the metro rail in Washington, D.C. In 1976, the company began work on the industrial city of Jubail in Saudi Arabia. The company's multiple construction contracts helped to transform the area from a small village to a city with a population of over a quarter of a million people.

In the 1980s, Bechtel handled the project management of the 1984 Los Angeles Summer Olympics. The company also built the Ankara-Gerede Motorway in Turkey as part of the network of roadways linking Europe and Asia in 1986.

In 1987, Bechtel was awarded a contract for project management services of an undersea tunnel linking the UK and France called the Channel Tunnel or "Chunnel". The tunnel was completed in 1994.

=== Increased business and visibility ===
The recession of the 1980s turned the company's focus toward new areas of growth including environmental cleanup and alternative energy projects. In 1989 Riley P. Bechtel was named president of the company.

In 1991, Bechtel, in a joint venture with Parsons Brinckerhoff, broke ground on Boston's Central Artery/Tunnel Project or "Big Dig", a project the company had been in charge of since 1986. The Big Dig was, at the time, the largest and most complex urban transportation project ever undertaken in the US. The 20-year project was critiqued for rising costs and increasing scope of work, as the Big Dig became more complex than was originally estimated. Criticism of the project increased in 2005 when a leak sprang in one of the new tunnels. In the summer of 2006, a faulty tunnel ceiling panel collapsed, killing a motorist. Litigation ensued, and in January 2008, Bechtel settled with federal and state officials for $352 million with other contractors involved paying smaller amounts.

As a result of the Gulf War, Bechtel accepted the task of extinguishing oil well fires in Kuwait in 1991. This fire-suppression project was part of the effort to rebuild the infrastructure of Kuwait.

In 1994, Bechtel began work on the US$20 billion Hong Kong Airport Core Programme, which was the largest civil engineering project at the time and included a new airport and nine other infrastructure projects. Bechtel's other major projects during the 1990s included the Athens Metro system, the Atlantic LNG in Trinidad, the Croatian Motorway, the Jubilee Line Extension for the London Underground, Quezon Power Plant in the Philippines, and a semiconductor plant in China. Bechtel also managed design and construction of facilities for Olympic games: the 1992 Barcelona Summer Olympics, and the Winter Games in Nagano, Japan in 1998. In the early 2000s, the company provided planning and management services for the 2002 Winter Olympics in Salt Lake City. In 2001, Bechtel was part of a consortium to project manage the US$4.3 billion construction of the CSPC Nanhai Petrochemicals Complex in China.

Several projects in the 2000s attracted controversy. In 2000, after a protest against water prices being raised by a utility partially owned by Bechtel in Bolivia, the company pulled out of the country and later filed suit against Bolivia for $25 million in losses. The claim was settled in 2006 for $0.30.

In 2001, Bechtel began work on the Hanford Tank Waste Treatment and Immobilization Plant at the Hanford site in Washington state. The project is a highly complex plant for the treatment of radioactive liquid waste that has employed new technologies and construction techniques that are the first of their kind. As of 2013, it is considered the most complex project in the US. Management of the project has been the subject of controversy including the Department of Energy's Inspector General reports and Government Accountability Office studies regarding rising costs, nuclear safety and quality, and whistleblower allegations. For example, in 2013 the DOE Inspector General concluded that "Bechtel determined that there was a systemic problem and a breakdown in controls over the review of design changes", but that the company had taken steps to correct the problems.

In 2003, Bechtel won a $680 million contract to begin rebuilding infrastructure in Iraq for U.S. Agency for International Development. The contract led to the company being accused of both non-competitive bidding and war profiteering. Bechtel won a competitively-bid second contract in January 2004, and completed 97 of 99 task orders of the contract, returning the two remaining projects due to the escalating security concerns in the country.

Following Hurricane Katrina in 2005, Bechtel was one of four companies hired by FEMA to build temporary housing. Bechtel delivered over 35,000 trailers in under a year for displaced residents in Mississippi, though the company was criticized by officials and in the media for the cost and quality of work.

In 2007, Bechtel began work on the Romanian A3 motorway (Autostrada Transilvania) and Albanian motorways. Bechtel and the Romanian National Roads Authority jointly agreed on a settlement to end the contract for works on the Autostrada Transilvania in 2013. The Albanian Motorway was opened to traffic in 2010 on schedule.

Other major projects at the end of the 2000s included the twinning of the Tacoma Narrows Bridge in Washington state, Jamnagar Refinery expansion in India, Equatorial GuineaLNG, and Oak Creek Power Plant in Wisconsin.

=== 2000 Bolivian water privatization, rate increase and violence ===
After years of unreliable water supply and 40% water loss in the city of Cochabamba, Bolivia, the World Bank pressured Bolivia to put SEMAPA (the Cochabamba water utility) up for auction without funding. Bechtel and others formed a consortium named "Aguas del Tunari" (Water of Tunari – a local regional term) to file a bid to the city of Cochabamba, Bolivia in 1999. Bechtel was a 27% partner and Abengoa S.A. of Spain was a 25% partner. This bid was in response to the increasing pressure from the World Bank, which had funded and extended water supply projects for the country of Bolivia, to privatize the water utility of Cochabamba. With the strings attached in 1995, and the World Bank participating in draft bids in 1997, the Aguas del Tunari consortium were the only bidders for the auction. The bid was accepted, under pressure of the World Bank and the conditions of their loans to Bolivia. The terms were ratified in the often-cited Law 2029 by the legislative body of Bolivia, however largely it had previously been accepted and influenced by local governments. Under the terms, Bechtel and the consortium immediately raised water pricing 35% and after the first month they had raised the price for water to the residents by almost 60% and in other parts much higher. The Bechtel consortium contract claimed harvesting of rainwater violated its contract essentially monopolizing the supply of water to millions of people. Water became one fifth of the average person's expenses and protests erupted. Protests were met with a cold shoulder response by Bechtel expressing they would simply cut-off water to those who did not pay. Further protests were enhanced when agricultural sectors realized the bylaws allowed Bechtel and the consortium rights to rain water as well, which was assumed to mean they could no longer collect rain water.

Violence between protesters and police resulted in the burning of government buildings and hundreds of injured within the first days of the conflict. The local governments of Manfred Reyes Villa (mayor) and Jose Pepe Orias (prefect or governor) resigned. The contract was ultimately abandoned, for which Bechtel in February 2021 demanded settlement. The aftermath of the violence was destruction of public property in downtown Cochabamba paid for by taxpayers, the death of one civilian, restitution by the government, and hundreds of injured police, military personnel, and protestors. A movie titled Even the Rain with actor Gael García Bernal depicts a historical fiction story set in this time. The conflict became known as the Cochabamba Water War.

== Locations and operational activities ==
Bechtel's major operational locations are in Brisbane, Calgary, Chandler, Arizona, Dubai, Houston, Knoxville, Tennessee, London, New Delhi, Reston, Virginia, San Francisco, Santiago, Shanghai, Nairobi, Taipei, and Washington, D.C.

The company is headquartered in Reston, which also houses the company's global operational headquarters, as well as the headquarters of the Nuclear, Security & Environmental global business unit and the Americas offices of the Infrastructure global business unit. The company's Oil, Gas & Chemicals unit is based in the Houston office. The Washington office is home to the government affairs team, and maintains a Political Action Committee.

Outside of North America, the Infrastructure unit's headquarters is located at the company's London office. The Mining & Metals unit is based out of Santiago, Chile, and Brisbane. In 2013, the company established its global center of engineering excellence in Dubai focusing on rail and marine projects. It established innovation centers in Houston and London in 2015 and Santiago in 2018 to test new technology.

Bechtel works on global megaprojects through its four business units. The company frequently manages work from design through construction phases. Its corporate values include safety, quality, and ethics.

Bechtel was the presenting sponsor of "Dream Big: Engineering Our World", a 42-minute IMAX documentary produced by MacGillivray Freeman Films in partnership with American Society of Civil Engineers. The documentary seeks to inspire young people to pursue engineering careers.

Bechtel opened its welding and applied technology center in 2017 in the Houston Energy Corridor to train welding and construction workers. The center also provides virtual training and augmented reality to train workers.

Its Houston offices were in the Houston Galleria area; in 2022 the company announced it would move those offices to Westchase, Houston effective late 2023.

=== Infrastructure ===
The Infrastructure unit handles transportation, power, and hydroelectric facilities. Transportation projects include highways, bridges, rail, and aviation facilities. Bechtel has built more than 17,200 miles (27,700 km) of roadway, 390 power plants, 50 hydroelectric plants, as well as 20 towns and cities globally. It has worked on 300 subway and rail projects, 80 port and harbor projects, and 96 major airport projects.

Bechtel's Infrastructure unit is leading a consortium in the engineering, procurement and construction of lines One and Two of the Riyadh, Saudi Arabia metro, which began construction in April 2014. In July 2014, Bechtel was selected to build a new 37-mile motorway linking Kosovo's capital, Pristina, to Macedonia.

Bechtel is also participating in the building of London's Crossrail, a $24 billion project that will connect commuter towns east and west of London and is intended to serve an estimated 200 million people a year upon completion. As of June 2015, the project is 65% complete.

In 2016, Bechtel began construction on the first phase of the Edmonton Valley Line Light Rail Transit project in Alberta, Canada, the first public–private partnership (P3) business group. The company is also involved in several ongoing projects as of 2016, including building national infrastructure in Gabon and supporting the continuous development of Jubail industrial city in Saudi Arabia. Bechtel has worked at Jubail for more than 40 years, and was granted a five-year extension on both projects June 2016.

In February 2017, Bechtel was chosen to support setting up and operating Saudi Arabia's National Project Management Office. In May 2017, Bechtel was appointed the delivery management partner for the tunnels and stations excavation package of Stage 2 of the Sydney Metro project. Considered Australia's largest public infrastructure project, the work includes new twin rail tunnels under Sydney Harbour.

Bechtel won the contract in August 2017 to design and build a 473-kilometer highway with 19 interchanges linking Nairobi, Kenya's capital, to Mombasa, Kenya's main port. The first section is targeted to open in October 2019 and the entire length of the highway is scheduled to be complete in 2024.

In 2018, Bechtel's work on the Panda Power Funds' 1.1 GW natural gas Hummel Station Power Plant in Pennsylvania was completed. Bechtel is also working on a project for Advanced Power, the Cricket Valley Energy Center in New York. Bechtel is also building the Keeyask Generating Station, a hydroelectric power plant for Manitoba Hydro in Manitoba, Canada. The Infrastructure unit had also worked on projects for Google Fiber in several markets in the Southeastern U.S.

Among completed projects, Bechtel finished a 10.8 miles (17.4 km) four-lane motorway in Kosovo a year ahead of schedule in November 2013. The unit completed the 143 MW Catalina Solar photovoltaic generating facility and the construction of the 250 MW California Valley Solar Ranch in 2013. Bechtel also completed the Hanna Region Transmission Development, a power transmission project in Canada, which included 1,200 new transmission towers and 85 miles (137 km) of transmission lines in 2013. Bechtel completed Phase I of an extension of the Dulles Corridor Metrorail in Northern Virginia and completed the Hamad International Airport in Doha, Qatar, in 2014. Bechtel also completed the world's largest solar thermal project, the Ivanpah Solar Electric Generating System in California, which began producing power in February 2014.

In 2015, Bechtel began work as project manager of the Toronto-York Spadina subway extension for the Toronto Transit Commission. The project was completed in 2017. Bechtel completed construction of the Stonewall Energy Facility in May 2017. The 778 megawatt natural gas-fired power plant supplies electricity to 778,000 homes in northern Virginia and the Washington, D.C., metro area. Bechtel's work on the Carroll County Energy Facility in Ohio for Advanced Power was also completed in 2017. In 2018, the unit completed a new air passenger terminal in Muscat, Oman. In May 2022, Bechtel was hired to update the Vision 2041 plan for Shannon Foynes Port in Ireland.

=== Mining & Metals ===
The Mining & Metals (M&M) unit works on projects related to the mining and production of materials such as aluminum, coal, copper, iron ore, alumina and other metals and minerals. The unit operates on six continents and has completed hundreds of major mining projects as well as more than 1,000 mining studies. It has also finished 42 major copper projects, 30 aluminum smelters, 15 major coal projects, and eight alumina refinery projects.

In 2013, the unit completed construction of Saudi Arabia's first aluminum smelter in Ras Al-Khair, the Daunia coal mine in Queensland, Australia, and the expansion of the Kooragang Coal Terminal in Port Waratah in Australia, increasing capacity to 145 million tonnes per annum (Mtpa).

In 2014, M&M completed the Caval Ridge coal mine in Queensland, and began operations at Escondida's OLAP copper cathode project, which consisted of a new dynamic leaching pad and a mineral handling system.

In 2015, the unit completed the Las Bambas copper concentrator in Peru for MMG, the Kitimat aluminum smelter in Canada for Rio Tinto Group., and the Escondida Organic Growth Project 1 (OGP1), the largest single-line copper concentrator ever built. M&M also completed a third berth for the BHP Billiton Mitsubishi Alliance (BMA) at Hay Point Coal Terminal in Queensland, Australia, which increased export capacity from the existing 44 Mtpa to 55 Mtpa.

Bechtel began building the Al Taweelah alumina refinery (formerly Shaheen) in Abu Dhabi, United Arab Emirates for Emirates Global Aluminium (EGA) in 2015.

In April 2016, Aluminium Bahrain (Alba) announced that Bechtel had been appointed engineering, procurement, and construction management (EPCM) contractor for the company's Line 6 Expansion Project. The initiative will make Alba the world's largest single-site aluminum smelter upon completion, boosting production to 1.5 Mtpa. That same month, Rio Tinto announced that Kitimat had reached full production levels of 420,000 tonnes per annum, while Las Bambas achieved commercial production in July 2016. As of 2016, Bechtel is advancing the Amrun bauxite initiative for Rio Tinto in Australia, which announced project approval in November 2015.

Bechtel completed the engineering, procurement, and construction of a water system and desalination plant for the Escondida copper mine in Chile in 2018. The Bechtel-Techint joint venture team built a dual 112-mile-long pipeline to carry desalinated water from the Pacific Coast across the Atacama Desert to the Escondida copper mine approximately 10,000 feet above sea level in the Andes.

In 2023, Bechtel was awarded EPCM contract for the Thacker Pass lithium mine in Humboldt County, Nevada.

=== Energy ===
The Energy unit designs and builds liquefied natural gas (LNG), oil, pipeline, petrochemicals, natural gas, and water treatment facilities. Since the company's founding, it has built approximately 50,000 miles (80,000 km) of pipeline systems, more than 50 major oil and gas field developments, and completed over 380 major chemical and petrochemical projects. The unit also constructs and tests tanks for LNG storage. Bechtel has built a third of the world's LNG liquefaction capacity.

Between 2011 and 2016, the unit built three LNG plants on Curtis Island in Queensland, Australia. It completed the first of six trains in December 2014. The complex was named a 2016 Global Best Project by Engineering News-Record in the category of "Power/Industrial" and a Construction Project of the Year by S&P Global Platts. The unit also built the Wheatstone project, a two-train LNG plant that is one of Australia's largest energy resource efforts. Following completion of Train 1 in late 2017, Train 2 of the facility moved into production mid-2018.

Bechtel has built five LNG production trains for Cheniere Energy Partners LP as the Sabine Pass liquefaction project in Cameron Parish, Louisiana. The initial cargo from the first completed train was delivered in 2016. In November 2018, the unit has completed the first of three LNG trains on the Corpus Christi Liquefaction project in Texas. The Corpus Christi project includes three LNG trains, three LNG storage tanks, and two berths. In 2016, Bechtel completed roof raises on two tanks at a liquefaction plant in Corpus Christi, Texas, for Cheniere.

In May 2013, the unit was awarded a contract for the front-end engineering design of the Pacific NorthWest LNG in Vancouver, BC. In March 2014, the unit was awarded a contract to construct facilities in Georgia for the Shah Deniz II gas field in Azerbaijan. In August 2015, Bechtel was contracted by Delfin LNG, to provide front-end engineering and design for a planned floating LNG vessel at Port Delfin off the coastline of Louisiana, which would be the first in the U.S., and a $14 billion contract for 13 million tonnes/year for Japan and South Korea was made in 2026. Also in 2015, the unit was awarded a contract to manage the engineering, procurement, and construction of 12 new natural-gas pipelines in Thailand.

The company was part of a consortium selected by PTT GC America in 2015 to provide front-end engineering and design for a new petrochemical complex in Belmont County, Ohio. It is also the lead contractor for a Shell petrochemical plant in Beaver County, Pennsylvania.

Bechtel's technology was licensed for facility upgrades at the Rijeka Refinery in Croatia in February 2014. In 2016, the unit was contracted by the Egyptian General Petroleum Corporation to design an upgrade to the coker unit at the Assiut refinery in Egypt using its ThruPlus technology. Also in 2016, it was awarded a contract to upgrade a refinery in Beaumont, Texas, for ExxonMobil, using ExxonMobil's proprietary SCANfining technology.

In late 2017, the unit was selected to design and build Tellurian's Driftwood LNG project, a proposed liquefied gas facility in Louisiana. In January 2018, the unit was awarded a front-end engineering design contract for Abu Dhabi National Oil Company's planned offshore ultra-sour gas mega project located in the north western area of Abu Dhabi.

In June 2019, Kallanish Energy reported that Bechtel had been hired by Thailand's PTT Global Chemical America and South Korea-based partner Daelim to build a $6 billion ethane cracker on the Ohio River in Belmont County, Ohio.

=== Nuclear, Security & Environmental ===
The Nuclear, Security & Environmental unit handles the company's government work and commercial nuclear businesses. The unit supports U.S. and international governmental organizations including the U.S. Departments of Defense and Energy. Since the 1950s, Bechtel has designed, serviced, or delivered 80 percent of all nuclear plants in the U.S.

As of 2019, Bechtel leads or is a member of a consortium that manages a national laboratory and several national security-related facilities in the U.S., including: the Lawrence Livermore National Laboratory, and the combined operations of the Y-12 National Security Complex and the Pantex Plant.

Bechtel has been contracted to manage the United States Navy's nuclear propulsion research facilities since 2011. In June 2013 the unit completed design and construction on a U.S. Missile Defense Agency project at Fort Greely, Alaska, which included three missile fields and forty silos. In 2014 the U.K. Ministry of Defence selected Bechtel to support the Royal Navy and Air Force on procurement and managed support services. Additionally, in 2016, Bechtel began providing testing and operations for the Arnold Engineering Development Complex at the Arnold Air Force Base in Tennessee.

Other government work includes the construction of the facilities to treat the liquid radioactive waste stored underground at the Department of Energy's Hanford nuclear waste site in Washington. Bechtel and AECOM agreed in 2016 to pay $125 million to settle claims by the U.S. Department of Justice that the companies used subpar work while building a nuclear waste treatment facility at the Hanford Nuclear Reservation in Washington state, in addition to allegedly using public funds for lobbying. The companies did not admit wrongdoing; they said they settled to avoid long, costly litigation. In late 2017, Bechtel completed the assembly of two nuclear waste melters, each at 300 tons. The melters are the largest of their kind ever built in the United States.

The unit also manages U.S. Department of Defense contracts to dismantle and dispose of stored chemical weapons, including decades-old mustard and nerve gas from World War II. By 2019, the Pueblo Chemical Agent-Destruction Pilot Plant in Colorado had destroyed nearly 100,000 munitions. Bechtel completed the construction of the Blue Grass Chemical Agent-Destruction Pilot Plant in 2015. Since May 2012, Bechtel has been part of a consortium completing the Chernobyl New Safe Confinement, a structure that will safely confine the damaged Chernobyl Nuclear Reactor Number 4. Bechtel continues to oversee the operation. In November 2016, the team slid a massive containment arch to cover the damaged nuclear reactor and contain radioactive material.

In 2016, Bechtel completed work on Tennessee Valley Authority's Watts Bar 2 nuclear reactor. In May 2016, a joint venture including Bechtel won a contract to conduct front-end engineering and design for the eventual construction of Wylfa Newydd, a nuclear power station in Wales for Horizon Nuclear Power.

In August 2017, Bechtel took over as the lead contractor to complete construction at Georgia Power's Plant Vogtle, estimated in 2022 at $30 billion. Bechtel was awarded the contract and took over day-to-day construction of Plant Vogtle's Units 3 and 4 after Westinghouse Electric, the designer and principal contractor for the two new reactors, filed for bankruptcy.

As of 2018, Bechtel is building the Uranium Processing Facility at the Y-12 National Security Complex in Tennessee. The $6.5 billion project is part of the National Nuclear Security Administration program to replace aging, Cold War-era facilities that service, refresh, and replace the uranium stages of nuclear warheads.

As of April 2025, Dena Volovar is to succeed John Howanitz as president of Bechtel’s nuclear, security and environmental business (NS&E), the company has announced. Howanitz is retiring in April after 42 years with Bechtel. He has served as president of the NSS&E business since 2021. Volovar brings more than 26 years of experience within Bechtel to the role. This includes executive vice president and general manager of NS&E’s environmental and security business line, where she managed Bechtel’s relationship with the US Department of Energy.

=== Manufacturing and technology ===
The Manufacturing & Technology unit designs and builds projects in the semiconductor, electric vehicle, synthetic materials, and data center markets. M&T was contracted by Intel in November 2022 to build a semiconductor manufacturing facility in Ohio. Another project initiated in 2022–2023 included electrical vehicle charging infrastructure for school bus provider First Student.

== Management ==
Brendan Bechtel is chairman and CEO and is the fifth generation of the Bechtel family to lead the company. Craig Albert is president and chief operating officer. Keith Hennessey is chief financial officer.

Several high-ranking Bechtel executives at times held important positions in the United States government. Notably, Ronald Reagan's cabinet had two former Bechtel executives: Caspar Weinberger and George Shultz, serving as Secretary of Defense and Secretary of State respectively.

At the end of 2009 Jude Laspa, Deputy Chief Operating Officer, Executive Vice President and Director, retired from Bechtel ending a 43 year career with the company.

== Financials and rankings ==
In 2017, Bechtel ranked eighth on Forbes' list of America's Largest Private Companies by revenue, and 7th on Fortune's list of the 25 Most Important Private Companies. The company has been named the top U.S. Contractor by revenue by Engineering News-Record for 20 years in a row and ranked 12th on the publication's Top 250 International Contractors list by revenue for 2018.

== Major projects ==
Name	Image	Description
Hoover Dam		Arch-gravity dam in the Black Canyon of the Colorado River commissioned by the Bureau of Reclamation to control flooding and provide water and hydroelectric power to the Southwestern United States and California. At the time of construction, it was the world's biggest dam and the largest public works project in the history of the U.S. Bechtel bid on the project as part of Six Companies, Inc., a group of several smaller contractors. Bechtel led construction from 1931 until completion in 1935. The Hoover Dam was Bechtel's first megaproject.
Bay Area Rapid Transit (BART)		Public transportation system for San Francisco Bay Area. Bechtel engineered, designed, and built BART for the Bay Area Rapid Transit District through a joint venture called Parsons-Brinckerhoff-Tudor-Bechtel. Construction began in 1964 and was completed in 1976.
Jubail Industrial City		Largest industrial city in the Middle East and the largest construction engineering project in the world. Bechtel has been overseeing construction since the project's inception in the mid-1970s. The city has been built from a master plan designed by Bechtel and encompasses infrastructure to support 19 primary industries, and produce oil and gas-based products including refined oil, petrochemicals, steel, glass and aluminum. Bechtel has also built housing, retail space, mosques, schools, clinics, and fire stations. Bechtel began construction on an expansion to the city, called Jubail Industrial City II, in 2006.
Channel Tunnel		32-mile undersea tunnel connecting the United Kingdom and France considered by the American Society of Civil Engineers to be one of the "Seven Wonders of the Modern World". Bechtel was chosen to manage the project by Eurotunnel in 1987. Construction lasted from 1988 to 1994.
Kuwait Oil Field Restoration		Following the Gulf War, Bechtel was contracted to lead a team to restore oil fields damaged by Iraqi forces, including repairing 749 wells, of which 650 were on fire. Bechtel completed the task in eight months and under budget.
Boston Central Artery/Tunnel		Section of Interstate 93 that runs through downtown Boston, Massachusetts. Bechtel and Parsons Brinckerhoff jointly supervised the planning and construction that re-routed and rebuilt the Central Artery from an elevated roadway to a series of tunnels. Planning began in 1982 and construction lasted from 1991 to 2006, approximately ten years longer than initially planned. Also known as "Big Dig", the project included construction of the Leonard P. Zakim Bunker Hill Memorial Bridge, the widest cable-stayed bridge in the world, and an underwater tunnel that traverses the Boston Harbor and connects downtown Boston with Logan International Airport. The megaproject was considered the most complex and expensive highway project in United States history.
High Speed 1		High-speed railway that connects London with the Channel Tunnel. Originally called the Channel Tunnel Rail Link (CTRL), Bechtel led the London and Continental Railways consortium of companies in the design, project management, and construction of the railway, including a renovation of the St Pancras railway station. The group was selected by the UK government in 1996 and construction was completed in 2007. High Speed 1 is considered the "UK's first truly high speed rail line".
Athens Metro		Rapid transit system in Athens, Greece. Bechtel led a consortium that built two new lines, including 17 miles of rail expansion and two stations prior to the 2004 Summer Olympics. The company also worked with Greece's Ministry of Culture and Sports to ensure unearthed archaeological artifacts were preserved. It's estimated that the system reduced traffic by between 200,00 and 375,000 cars.
Chernobyl New Safe Confinement		Structure to confine the Chernobyl Nuclear Power Plant in Ukraine, which exploded in 1986 in the worst nuclear accident in history. The confinement is designed to last 100 years and replaces the original "sarcophagus" erected to contain radiation following the Chernobyl disaster. Bechtel began repairs in 1998 and was part of the team overseeing construction of the arch, which was installed over Unit 4 of the reactor in November 2016.
Hanford Waste Treatment and Immobilization Plant		Vitrification plant to process radioactive waste at the Hanford site in Washington into a stable form that can be safely disposed. Bechtel was selected by the United States Department of Energy to lead the team designing, constructing, and commissioning the plant, which is expected be the largest of its kind. Work began in 2001, but the project had significant delays due to technical problems and design issues. A new plant for processing "low-activity" waste was completed in January 2021.
Tacoma Narrows Bridge		Suspension bridge crossing the Puget Sound in Tacoma, Washington. The current Tacoma Narrows Bridge opened in 1950 after the original one collapsed in 1940. Bechtel was selected with Peter Kiewit and Sons by the Washington State Department of Transportation to build a second, parallel bridge to accommodate increased traffic. Construction began in 2002 and was completed in 2007. It was the largest American bridge built since the Verrazzano–Narrows Bridge in 1964.
Sabine Pass LNG		Facility of six LNG trains currently in development and a regasification plant at Sabine Pass in Louisiana. Bechtel is working on the project for Cheniere Energy Partners. Between 2005 and 2009, Bechtel built the regasification terminal. As of 2016, Trains 1 and 2 are complete, and the other trains are at varying levels of construction.
Los Alamos National Laboratory, Lawrence Livermore National Laboratory		U.S. research facilities that focus on nuclear weapons and national security. Bechtel has managed both laboratories in a joint venture with the University of California and other organizations since 2006 under contracts with the Department of Energy.
Watts Bar Nuclear Generating Station completion		Nuclear power plant in Tennessee made up of two reactors used for electric power generation. In 2007, Bechtel was chosen by the Tennessee Valley Authority to complete the second unit, which had stopped construction in 1985. Watts Bar Unit 2 was completed in 2015. It was the first nuclear reactor to come online in the United States since 1996.
Crossrail		Commuter rail linking Heathrow Airport to central London and providing connections to the city and suburbs. Bechtel is part of a team of companies overseeing construction. Development began in 2009 and tunneling was completed in 2015. The Crossrail is the largest infrastructure project in Europe, and it serves an estimated 1.5 million people.
Gabon National Infrastructure		Master plan for infrastructure development in Gabon. Called "Le Gabon Émergent", the plan was created by Bechtel and President Ali Bongo Ondimba in 2010. Its goal is to invest $25 billion in new infrastructure by 2025. Bechtel established the country's National Infrastructure Agency and is overseeing all public works projects in the country through 2016, including in the areas of education, housing, and transport.
Ivanpah Solar Electric Generating System		Solar thermal energy plant in the Mojave Desert in California. The plant was developed and designed by BrightSource Energy, which contracted Bechtel to construct the plant between 2009 and 2014. Bechtel was also an investor in the project. Ivanpah uses heat-generating mirrors that create steam, powering turbines that produce electricity. When it opened in February 2014, it was the largest operating solar farm in the world.
Curtis Island LNG		Three liquefied natural gas plants on Curtis Island in Queensland, Australia. Bechtel was contracted to design and build the LNGs for three separate joint ventures. Upon completion, the trains will produce 8% of all LNG production.
Riyadh Metro		Rapid transit system under construction in Riyadh, Saudi Arabia. Bechtel was contracted in 2013 to head a consortium to develop six lines, including all tunneling and stations. In 2016, Bechtel stated that it is the largest civil engineering project the company has undertaken in its history. The first lines of the Riyadh Metro are scheduled to begin operation in the final quarter of 2021.
Romania A3 Motorway		This is one of the most expensive highways in the world. Bechtel abandoned the project after it only built 54 km of the planned 400 km of Transylvania Motorway, for EUR 1.25 billion.
Jamnagar refinery		The globally competitive RPL refinery was commissioned in 36 months. RPL contracted several companies having expertise in engineering construction and refining like Bechtel, UOP LLC and Foster Wheeler amongst others. It is currently the largest oil refinery in the world.
