= Catalina Solar Project =

Photovoltaic power station in California

- Country: United States
- Location: Kern County, California
- Coordinates: 34°55′51″N 118°20′06″W
- Status: Operational
- Construction began: May 2012
- Commission date: Phase 1: December 2012, phase 2: August 2013
- Owner: enXco
- Operator: enXco

Solar farm
- Type: Flat-panel PV
- Site area: 445 ha (1,100 acres)

Power generation
- Units operational: >1.1 million
- Nameplate capacity: 143.2 MW

The Catalina Solar Project is a 143.2 megawatt (MW) photovoltaic power station located near Bakersfield, Kern County, California, owned by enXco, an EDF Énergies Nouvelles Company. It covers an area of 445 hectares (1,100 acres).

Construction began in May, 2012 and was fully completed in August, 2013. It uses thin-film PV panels bought from Solar Frontier (CIGS type) and First Solar (CdTe type).

Phase 1 had a nameplate capacity of 60 MW and was connected to the grid in December, 2012.

enXco has signed a 25-year Power Purchase Agreement (PPA) with San Diego Gas & Electric (SDG&E) for the production from the station.

That clean electricity could offset roughly 74,000 tons of carbon emissions each year.

== Production ==
Generation (MW·h) of Catalina Solar LLC
Year	Jan	Feb	Mar	Apr	May	Jun	Jul	Aug	Sep	Oct	Nov	Dec	Total
2012												200	200
2013	5,182	12,279	15,964	0	11,317	20,616	23,709	27,338	25,989	24,506	18,629	18,707	204,236
2014	18,991	19,563	24,927	27,237	28,264	28,924	27,446	27,679	25,766	24,371	20,038	14,777	287,983
2015	17,866	20,056	23,790	26,494	27,691	25,859	26,974	27,257	25,021	21,394	19,686	17,805	279,893
2016	14,873	21,747	23,337	20,187	26,765	27,173	28,073	26,978	24,757	21,016	18,962	15,500	269,368
Total													1,041,680

== See also ==
- Solar power in California
