= Fremont Group =

Private investment firm based in San Francisco, California

- Type: Private
- Industry: Financial services
- Founded: 1986; 40 years ago
- Founder: Bechtel family
- Headquarters: San Francisco, California, United States
- Area served: United States
- Products: Family office, investments
- Website: fremontgroup.com

Fremont Group is an American private investment group based in San Francisco, California. It was formerly known as Bechtel Investments up until 1993, reflecting its ownership by the Bechtel family. In 1993, its name was officially changed to Fremont Investors, Inc.

== History ==
Fremont Group was established in 1986 as the formal investment arm of the Bechtel family, whose wealth was derived primarily from the Bechtel Corporation, a global engineering and construction company founded in 1898. The firm was created to separate the family’s investment activities from Bechtel’s operating businesses and to manage long-term capital across a broad range of asset classes.

Prior to adopting the Fremont Group name, the organisation operated under Bechtel Investments, managing proprietary capital and select external partnerships. During the late 1980s and early 1990s, the firm expanded its investment mandate beyond passive holdings to include direct private equity transactions and control of its investments.

A notable early transaction occurred in 1993, when Fremont acquired the Coldwell Banker real estate brokerage business from Sears, Roebuck and Company. The investment was later exited in the mid-1990s as part of a broader restructuring of the U.S. real estate brokerage sector.

By the late 1990s and 2000s, Fremont Group had developed, with dedicated teams focused on hedge funds, real estate, venture capital, and private equity. The firm has historically emphasised long-term investment horizons and partnership-based strategies rather than short-term financial engineering.

In 2007, Calera Capital, a San Francisco-based private equity firm that spun out of the Fremont Group (its first institutional investor), changed its name from Fremont Partners as part of a rebranding effort in advance of raising its fourth private equity fund. The Fremont Group also distinguishing itself from Fremont General Corp, a financial services company and Fremont Investment & Loan, a retail bank.

== Organizations ==
The firm consists of three business areas:

- FPR Partners – a hedge fund
- Fremont Realty Capital – a real estate investment firm
- Fremont Ventures – a venture capital investment firm

== Controversy ==
On May 5, 2003, The New Yorker ran an article revealing that the bin Laden family had invested $10 million in The Fremont Group. The investments represented a small fraction of the assets managed by Fremont.
