= Stephen Bechtel Sr. =

American businessman (1900–1989)

Stephen Davison Bechtel
- Born: September 24, 1900; Aurora, Indiana, U.S.
- Died: 14 March 1989 (aged 88); Oakland, California, U.S.
- Resting place: Mountain View Cemetery; Oakland, California, U.S.
- Occupation: Businessman
- Spouse: Laura A. Peart (m. 1923)
- Children: 2, including Stephen Jr.
- Father: Warren A. Bechtel
- Relatives: Kenneth K. Bechtel (brother)

Stephen Davison Bechtel (September 24, 1900 – March 14, 1989) was the son of Clara Alice West and Warren A. Bechtel, founder of the Bechtel Corporation. He was the president of the company from 1933 to 1960.

== Early life ==
Stephen Davison Bechtel was born on September 24, 1900, in Aurora, Indiana, to Warren A. Bechtel. He grew up in construction camps, living with his father as he traveled to construction projects. He graduated from Oakland Technical High School in 1918, and served with the 20th Engineer Brigade, part of the American Expeditionary Force sent to assist France in World War I. In 1919, after the war, he attended the University of California, Berkeley for one year and left to work for his father's company full-time.

In 1923, Bechtel married Laura Adeline Peart, a Berkeley alumna, who would help her husband build the family-owned business into one of the world's largest engineering and construction firms.

== Bechtel Company ==
In 1925, Warren A. Bechtel, his sons Warren Jr, Stephen Sr, Kenneth (Ken), and his brother Arthur (Art) joined to incorporate as W.A. Bechtel Company. Stephen Sr. became vice-president of Bechtel in 1925. His father, Warren A. Bechtel, died suddenly while traveling to the Soviet Union in 1933. That came at a critical time for the company: concrete was being poured for the Hoover Dam, Bechtel's largest project. Stephen became president in 1935 and saw the company through the construction of the dam.

Over the next 30 years, Stephen expanded Bechtel into a successful engineering company with operations all over the world. He handed the presidency of the company over to his son, Stephen Jr. in 1960 but stayed on as the chairman until 1969.

Berkeley awarded Bechtel an honorary degree in Agricultural Science in 1954, and in 1980, it completed construction of the Bechtel Engineering Center, which was named in his honor. Before this the building was known as the Mechanics Building.

In 1976, Bechtel received the Golden Plate Award of the American Academy of Achievement.

== Death and legacy ==
Stephen Bechtel died on March 14, 1989, at Merritt Peralta Medical Center in Oakland, California. He was buried in Mountain View Cemetery in Oakland.

Stephen was named by Time magazine as one of the 100 most influential people of the 20th century.

The undergraduate engineering center of the University of California, Berkeley was named the "Bechtel Engineering Center."

One of the buildings of the Faculty of Engineering and Architecture at the American University of Beirut (AUB) is named "The Bechtel Engineering Building" after its donor, Stephen Bechtel.
