= Kenneth K. Bechtel =

American businessman (1904–1978)

Kenneth Karl Bechtel
- Born: July 4, 1904; Oakland, California, U.S.
- Died: February 4, 1978 (aged 73); Marin County, California, U.S.
- Resting place: Mountain View Cemetery, Oakland, California, U.S.
- Occupation: Businessman
- Spouses: Elizabeth Hay (m. 1926; div. 1961) Nancy Foote (m. 1961)
- Children: 2
- Father: Warren A. Bechtel
- Relatives: Stephen Bechtel Sr. (brother)

Kenneth Karl Bechtel (July 4, 1904 – February 4, 1978) was a businessman from California associated with the W. A. Bechtel Company and Industrial Indemnity, an insurance company. He also served as national president of the Boy Scouts of America from 1956 to 1959.

== Early life ==
Kenneth Karl Bechtel was born on July 4, 1904, in Oakland, California, to Warren A. Bechtel. He entered the family business while still in high school.

== Career ==
In 1925, Bechtel, his father and brothers, Warren Jr. and Stephen joined to incorporate as W.A. Bechtel Company. Bechtel started as the treasurer, vice president and director. He remained in the role of vice president and director until 1948.

In 1931, Bechtel was elected president and director of Industrial Indemnity Co.. In 1943, he was elected as chairman of the advisory committee of Industrial Indemnity Exchange. He served as chairman and chief executive officer of Industrial Indemnity Co. until 1970. In 1970, he became senior director of Industrial Indemnity Co.

From 1942 to 1945, during World War II, Bechtel was the head of Marinship Corp., a shipyard in Sausalito, California for the U.S. Maritime Commission. The shipyard built liberty ships, T2 tankers and Navy oilers.

Bechtel served as national president of the Boy Scouts of America from 1956 to 1959. He received both the Silver Buffalo Award and the Order of the Arrow Distinguished Service Award. He also served on the board of trustees of California Academy of Sciences and served as director of the National Audubon Society and the World Wide Fund.

== Personal life ==
Since the 1930s, Bechtel lived in Marin County, California. Later in life, he lived in Kentfield, California.

Bechtel married Elizabeth Hay in December 1926. They divorced in July 1961. They had two sons, Peter and Jon. Bechtel married Nancy Foote in November 1961.

Bechtel died on February 4, 1978, while hiking near Mount Tamalpais in Marin County. He was buried at Mountain View Cemetery in Oakland.
