= Warren A. Bechtel =

American businessman (1872–1933)

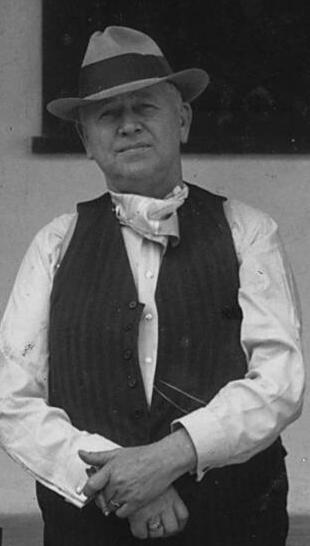
- Bechtel (1933)
- Born: Warren Augustine Bechtel; September 12, 1872; Freeport, Illinois, U.S.
- Died: August 28, 1933 (aged 60); Moscow, Soviet Union
- Resting place: Mountain View Cemetery; Oakland, California, U.S.
- Occupation: Businessman
- Spouse: Clara Alice West (m. 1897)
- Children: 4, including Stephen and Kenneth

Warren Augustine Bechtel (September 12, 1872 – August 28, 1933) was the founder of the Bechtel Corporation, the 2nd largest construction company in the United States as of 2022.

== Early life ==
Warren Augustine Bechtel was born on September 12, 1872, on a stock farm in Freeport, Illinois, as the fifth child of Elizabeth (Bentz) and John Moyer Bechtel in a family of two boys and five girls. The Bechtel family came to America from Germany in the 1700s. In 1884, his family moved to Kansas. In 1891, Warren graduated from Peabody High School in Peabody, Kansas. In 1897, Warren married Clara Alice West, from Aurora, Indiana, whom he had met while she visited her uncle (E.F. Davison) in Peabody.

== Career ==
In 1898, Bechtel and his wife moved from their farm near Peabody, Kansas, to the Oklahoma Territory to construct railroads with his own team of mules. Bechtel moved his family frequently between construction sites around the Western United States for the next several years and eventually moved to Oakland, California, in 1904, where he worked as the superintendent on the Western Pacific Railroad on its Richmond and Santa Fe lines. In 1906, W. A. Bechtel won his first subcontract to build part of the Oroville-to-Oakland section of the Western Pacific Railroad. The same year, he bought his own steam shovel, becoming a pioneer of the new technology. He painted "W.A. Bechtel Co." on the side of the steam shovel, effectively establishing Bechtel as a company though it was not yet incorporated.

Over the next 20 years, Bechtel built a sizable contracting business that specialized in railroad and highway building. One of Bechtel's earliest major contracts was grading the site of the Oroville, California, depot for the Western Pacific Railroad, then under construction. In 1919, Warren Bechtel and his partners (including his brother Arthur) built the Klamath Highway in California, and in 1921, Warren Bechtel partners won a contract to build the water tunnels for the Caribou Hydroelectric Facility in that state. In 1925, Warren, his sons Warren Jr, Stephen, Kenneth, and his brother Arthur (Art) joined to incorporate as W.A. Bechtel Company. In 1926, the new company won its first major contract, the Bowman Lake dam in Nevada County, California. The firm would later partner with other companies to form Six Companies to help engineer the famous Hoover Dam over the Colorado River, still considered the largest civil engineering project in US history. In 1930, Bechtel constructed a natural gas pipeline from Tracy, California, to Crockett, California, for Standard Oil and a pipeline from Milpitas, California, to Tres Pinos, California, for the Pacific Gas and Electric Company. In 1931, Bechtel replaced William H. Wattis as president of the Six Companies.

== Death ==
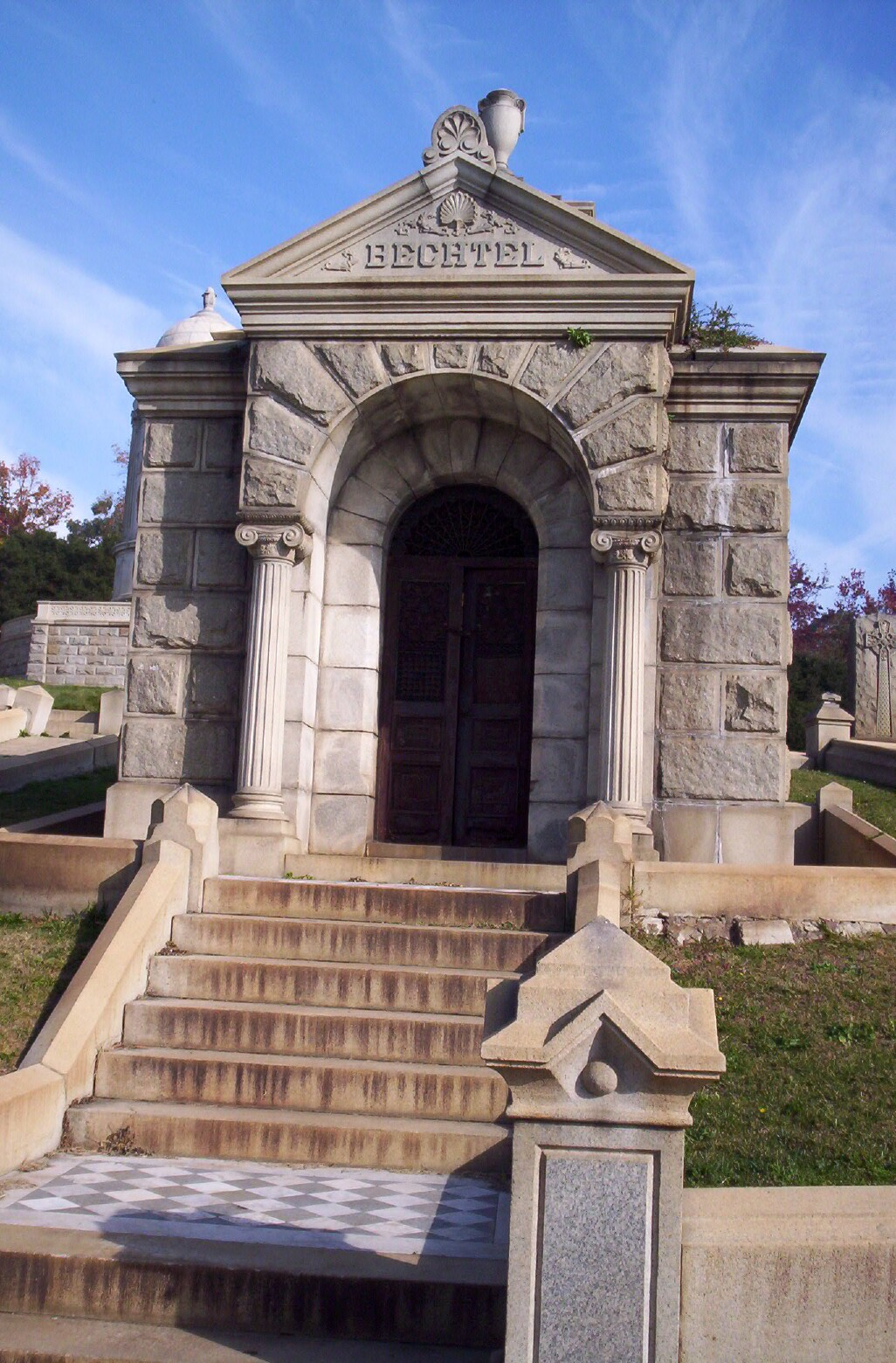
Bechtel mausoleum at Mountain View Cemetery in Oakland, California.

Bechtel died of an accidental insulin overdose on a business visit to Moscow, Soviet Union, to inspect the Dnieprostroi Dam, in 1933. He died in the Hotel National. He was buried at Mountain View Cemetery in Oakland, California.

== Legacy ==
His son, Stephen D. Bechtel Sr., took over the firm upon his father's death. The Bechtel Corporation is still owned and operated by the Bechtel family. Its current CEO is Brendan Bechtel.

In 1997, Warren was inducted into the Kansas Business Hall of Fame.
