= B. Morris Young =

Founder of the Young Men organization of the LDS Church

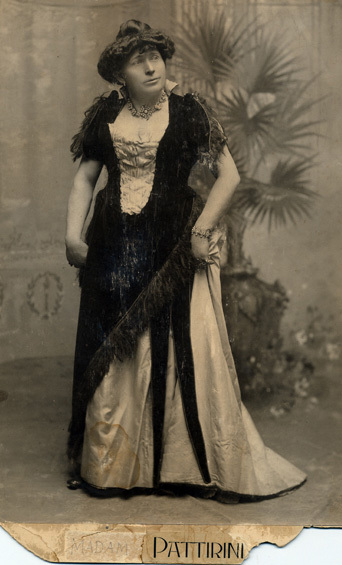
- B. Morris Young dressed up as "Madam Pattirini", c. 1901

Personal details
- Born: Brigham Morris Young; January 18, 1854; Salt Lake City, Utah Territory
- Died: February 20, 1931 (aged 77); Salt Lake City, Utah
- Resting place: Salt Lake City Cemetery; 40.7772°N 111.8580°W
- Spouse(s): Armeda Snow
- Parents: Brigham Young; Margaret Pierce

Brigham Morris Young (January 18, 1854 – February 20, 1931) was one of the founders of the Young Men's Mutual Improvement Association (YMMIA), the predecessor to the Young Men program of the Church of Jesus Christ of Latter-day Saints (LDS Church).

Young was the son of Brigham Young and one of his wives, Margaret Pierce. In 1875, Morris Young served a mission for the LDS Church in the Hawaiian Islands. Shortly after returning from this mission, he was asked by his father to organize the YMMIA along with Junius F. Wells and Milton H. Hardy.

In 1883, Young served another mission in the Hawaiian Islands. He married Armeda Snow, a daughter of Lorenzo Snow. Their son, Lorenzo Snow Young, was a prominent architect in Utah.

In 1885, Young, his wife, and their children returned from serving his second mission in the Hawaiian Islands. Shortly after returning to Utah, Young began publicly performing in drag as a cross-dressing singer under the pseudonym Madam Pattirini. Young performed as Pattirini in north and central Utah venues from 1885 to the 1900s. He could produce a convincing falsetto, and many in the audience did not realize that Pattirini was Young. One of his performances as Madam Pattirini was for the last birthday celebration of LDS Church president Lorenzo Snow in April 1901. He also once portrayed a "fine Irish girl" named Bridget McCarthy at a Christmas ball at the Salt Lake Theatre in 1886.

== See also ==
- Descendants of Brigham Young

== Sources ==
- Andrew Jenson. LDS Biographical Encyclopedia. Vol. 4, p. 251.
- Galen Snow Young. Brief History of Brigham Morris Young. P. 31.
- Dean C. Jessee. Letters from Brigham Young to His Sons. P. 243.
