= Benco Dental =

- Type: Dental supply and equipment distributor
- Industry: Dental/healthcare
- Genre: Private
- Founded: 1930
- Founder: Benjamin Cohen
- Headquarters: Pittston, Pennsylvania, US
- Area served: United States
- Key people: Larry Cohen (chairman and chief customer advocate); Chuck Cohen (managing director); Rick Cohen (managing director)
- Products: Dental supplies, equipment, service, technology and office design services
- Number of employees: 1384 as of November 2015
- Website: www.benco.com

Benco Dental is an American dental product and equipment distributor based in Pittston, Pennsylvania.

== History ==
Benco Dental has been privately owned and operated since 1930, when first-generation owner, Benjamin Cohen, moved to Northeast Pennsylvania after six years of traveling from train station to train station, selling dental supplies.

Benco Dental is now the largest privately owned full-service distributor of dental supplies, dental equipment, dental consulting & dental equipment services in the U.S. The company has remained family-owned and is in its third generation of leadership. During the company's 94-year history, Benco Dental has grown from a single storefront location in Wilkes-Barre, Pennsylvania, into the nation's fastest-growing dental distributor, with 5 distribution centers servicing dental professionals in 48 states and Washington D.C.

In 2010, Benco Dental opened a new 280,000-square-foot (26,000 m^{2}) corporate headquarters, distribution center and equipment showroom in Pittston, Pennsylvania. The new facility also houses the company's first CenterPoint design and equipment showroom, the largest dental equipment showroom in North America, featuring 27 fully functional operatories, a complete digital dentistry suite featuring dozens of scanners and 3D printers, 13 operational digital imaging panoramic X-rays including 2D and 3D units, 4 sterilization centers, office design & lab concept suites and a summit training center that will host continuing education courses. Benco subsequently opened two additional CenterPoint design and equipment showrooms in Costa Mesa, California, and Flower Mound, Texas. Additionally Benco Dental's footprint includes four distribution centers (Fort Wayne, Indiana; Jacksonville, Florida; Reno, Nevada; and Dallas, Texas), over 400 sales territory representatives and 300 service technicians.

In February 2018, the Federal Trade Commission accused Benco Dental, Patterson Companies, and Henry Schein, the three largest American full-service distributors of dental supplies, of violating antitrust law. In October 2019, an FTC administrative law judge dismissed the claims against Henry Schein while ruling that Benco and Patterson had violated antitrust laws by refusing to compete for the business of buying groups.

In 2023, Benco Dental acquired PPO Profits, a provider of dental fee negotiations and revenue cycle management services, which is operated as a standalone company.

== See also ==
- Dental Depot
