= Glenn L. Pace =

American LDS Church leader (1940–2017)

Emeritus General Authority
- October 2, 2010 – May 16, 2017
- Called by: Thomas S. Monson

First Quorum of the Seventy
- October 3, 1992 – October 2, 2010
- Called by: Ezra Taft Benson
- End reason: Granted general authority emeritus status

Second Counselor in the General Young Men's Presidency
- 2001 – 2004
- Called by: F. Melvin Hammond

Second Counselor in the Presiding Bishopric
- April 6, 1985 – October 3, 1992
- Called by: Robert D. Hales
- End reason: Honorably released

Personal details
- Born: Glenn Leroy Pace; March 21, 1940; Provo, Utah, U.S.
- Died: May 16, 2017 (aged 77); Bountiful, Utah, U.S.

Glenn Leroy Pace (March 21, 1940 – May 16, 2017) was a general authority of the Church of Jesus Christ of Latter-day Saints (LDS Church) from 1985 until his death. As a general authority, he served as a counselor in the presiding bishopric and also in the First Quorum of Seventy. In 2010, he was designated an emeritus general authority.

== Early life and education ==
Pace was born to Kenneth LeRoy Pace and his wife, the former Elizabeth Anna Wilde, in Provo, Utah, where he was also raised. In the early 1960s, he served as an LDS missionary in the New England region of the United States. Pace received bachelor's and master's degrees in accounting from Brigham Young University.

== Employment ==
Pace worked for two "big eight" financial firms and as a CFO of a land development firm. In 1980 he decided to take a job working full-time for the LDS Church so he could focus more on spiritual matters. That same year he quickly moved from a low level accountant position to welfare services manager. Among other assignments while in this position Pace accompanied M. Russell Ballard on a trip to Ethiopia in early 1985 to determine what assistance the church could provide in providing famine relief.

== LDS Church service ==
Pace served in the LDS Church as an elders quorum president, counselor in a bishopric, and stake clerk.

In 1985, when Robert D. Hales became the church's presiding bishop, Pace was appointed as his second counselor. One role he had in this position was doing an initial search into allegations of ritualized abuse committed by Church members (see Pace memorandum). In 1992, Pace was released from the Presiding Bishopric and became a member of the First Quorum of the Seventy. That same year he served as the first president of the church's Australia Sydney North Mission, while also serving in the First Quorum of Seventy.

In 1997 and 1998, he was a member of the general presidency of the church's Sunday School and from 2001 to 2003 he was in the general presidency of the Young Men organization.

Pace was released and designated an emeritus general authority at the church's October 2010 general conference.

== Personal life ==
Pace married Jolene Clayson in the Salt Lake Temple in 1963 and they had six children. He died on May 16, 2017, in Bountiful, Utah, at age 77.

== Books ==
Pace has written three books:

- Spiritual Plateaus (Deseret Book, 1991), about three plateaus Latter-day Saints face: testimony, sanctification, and spiritual graduate school.
- Spiritual Revival (Deseret Book, 1993).
- Safe Journey: An African Adventure (Shadow Mountain, 2003), about his various journeys in Africa, many of which were connected with the operations of the LDS Humanitarian Services.

== See also ==
- Henry B. Eyring
- H. David Burton
- Pace memorandum

== Notes ==
The Church of Jesus Christ of Latter-day Saints titles
| Preceded by F. Melvin Hammond | Second Counselor in the General Young Men's Presidency; 2001 – 2003 | Succeeded by Lynn G. Robbins |
| Preceded by J. Richard Clarke | Second Counselor in the Presiding Bishopric; April 6, 1985 – October 3, 1992 | Succeeded by Richard C. Edgley |
