= Bradley R. Wilcox =

American professor (born 1959)

Brad Wilcox
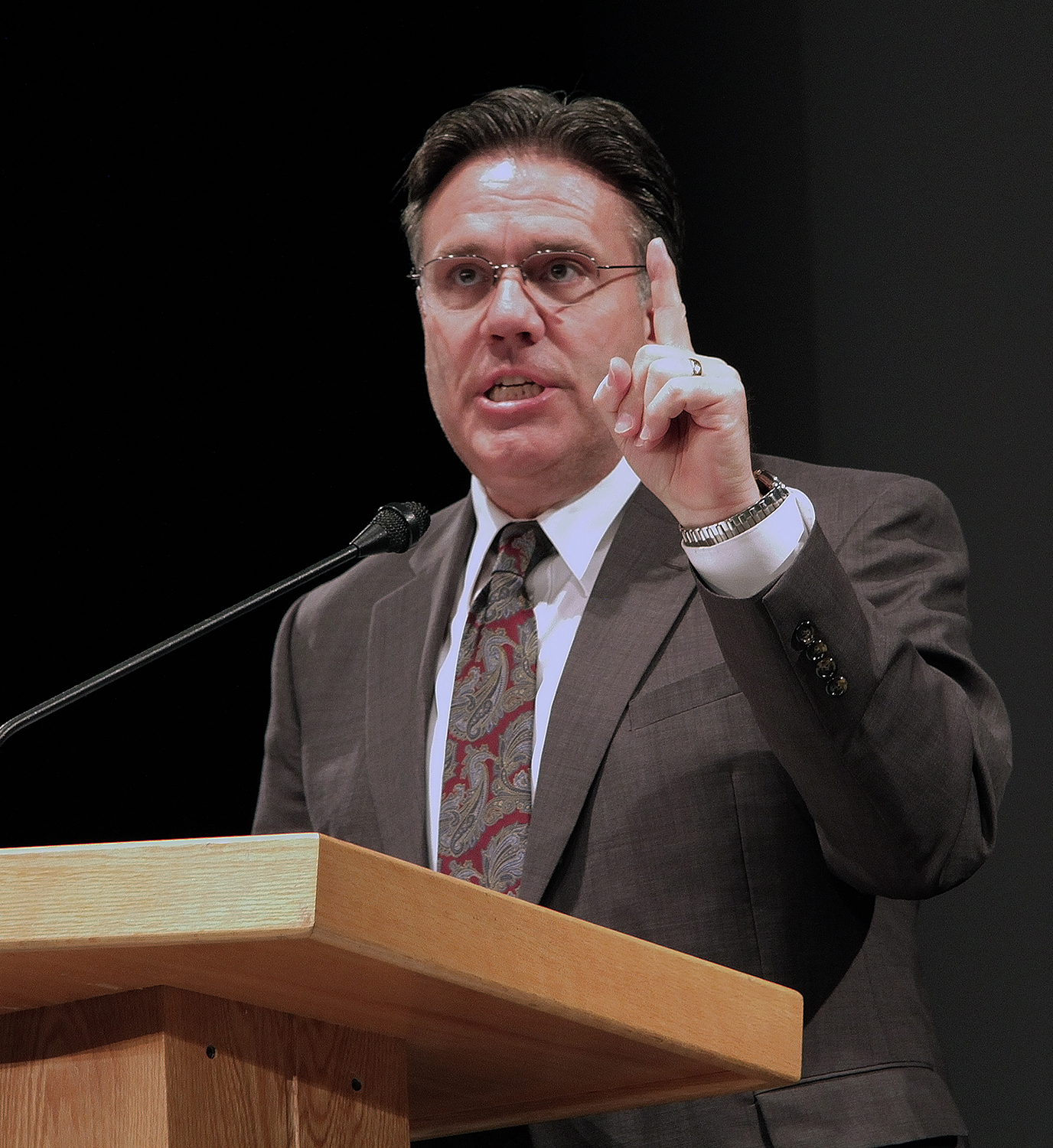
- Born: 25 December 1959 (age 66)
- Education: Brigham Young University, B.S., M.Ed. University of Wyoming, PhD
- Occupation: Professor
- Employer: Brigham Young University
- Spouse: Deborah G. Gunnell
- Children: 4

Bradley Ray Wilcox (born December 25, 1959) is a professor of ancient scripture at Brigham Young University (BYU) and was a counselor in the Young Men general presidency of the Church of Jesus Christ of Latter-day Saints (LDS Church) from April 2020 to August 2025. He is the author of several books, most notably The Continuous Atonement. He often speaks at various LDS Church events and served on its Sunday School General Board.

== Early life and career ==
Wilcox was raised in Provo, Utah and, for a time, lived in Ethiopia. He served as a missionary for the LDS Church in the Chile Viña del Mar Mission, where he wrote the mission song. He attended BYU, graduating with a bachelor's degree in elementary education in 1985. Wilcox then worked as a sixth-grade teacher in Provo. He later earned a master's degree in teaching and learning, also from BYU. Wilcox received a Doctor of Philosophy from the University of Wyoming in "curriculum and instruction with a focus in literacy." He then became a professor at BYU, first in the Teacher Education Department, and later in the Department of Ancient Scripture.

== LDS Church service ==
He has served in multiple capacities within the LDS Church, including scout leader, bishop, member of the Sunday School General Board, and as president of the Chile Santiago East Mission from 2003 to 2006. In 2007, he was called as a counselor in the presidency of the BYU 4th Stake. Wilcox has often been a speaker at such Church Educational System programs as Especially for Youth, BYU Education Week, and the BYU Women's Conference. His devotional address at BYU, "His Grace is Sufficient", is one of the most viewed BYU speeches of all time and has received over 400,000 views on YouTube, according to Deseret News. On April 4, 2020, Wilcox was called as second counselor to Steven J. Lund in the LDS Church's Young Men general presidency. In April 2023, Wilcox was called as first counselor to Lund. In April 2025, it was announced that Wilcox would be released from the Young Men General Presidency, effective August 1, 2025.

== Controversial speech ==
On February 6, 2022, Wilcox delivered a devotional speech for the youth in Alpine, Utah (which was recorded on Zoom and widely shared on social media), and was subsequently criticized for its racial implications in his efforts to describe a point on faith in God's timing. He issued an apology the next day. After subsequent discussions with several African-American friends, including Ahmad S. Corbitt, First Counselor in the Young Men General Presidency, Wilcox issued a second apology during a youth devotional the following Sunday. Reporter Jana Riess stated that Wilcox's speech and scornful tone revealed that he "felt disdainful toward women" and believed that "God is a racist", and that his subsequent "not-quite-apologies" did not go far enough. Videos have surfaced of at least two other instances of Wilcox making somewhat similar speeches related to the concerns of Latter-day Saints over the priesthood and temple ban against black members of the church.

== Personal life ==
Wilcox married Deborah G. Gunnell and they are the parents of four children. She is a registered nurse and served a mission in Guatemala.

== Works ==
Books written by Wilcox include The Continuous Atonement, The Best Kept Secrets of Parenting, and Raising Ourselves to the Bar. He has also written articles on how to encourage children to read.

=== Articles ===
- "May I Have This Dance?", New Era, August 1979
- "Are You There?", New Era, April 1990
- "Helping Youth Feel They Belong," Ensign, April 1998
- "Why Write It?" Ensign, September 1999
- "If We Can Laugh at It, We Can Live with It," Ensign, March 2000
- "Effect of Difficulty Levels on Second-Grade Delayed Readers Using Dyad Reading," The Journal of Educational Research, with Alisa Morgan and J. Lloyd Eldredge, 2000
- "Watching Over the Web," BYU Magazine, Fall 2002
- "Keep Texting from Taking Over," Liahona, with Russell Wilcox, August 2007
- "Grace - Common Ground or Battleground?" LDS Living, 11 January 2020

=== Books ===
- Growing Up: Gospel Answers about Maturation and Sex (2000)
- Where Do Babies Come From? (2004)
- Raising Ourselves to the Bar (2007)
- The Continuous Atonement (Deseret Book Company, February 4, 2009, ISBN 978-1606410370)
- Developing Literacy: Reading and Writing To, With, and by Children, with Timothy G. Morrison (2013)
- 52 Life-changing Questions from the Book of Mormon (2013)
- Armor Up! with John Bytheway, Laurel Christensen, John Hilton III, Hank Smith, and Anthony Sweat (2013)
- Suit Up! with John Bytheway, Laurel Christensen, John Hilton III, Hank Smith, and Anthony Sweat (2013)
- The Continuous Conversion: God Isn't Just Proving Us, He's Improving Us (2013)
- With Healing in His Wings with Gary J. Coleman, John M. Madsen, Gaye Strathearn, Andrew C. Skinner, and Brent L. Top (2013)
- The 7-Day Christian: How Living Your Beliefs Every Day Can Change the World (Ensign Peak, April 8, 2014, ISBN 978-1609078515)
- Tips For Tackling Teenage Troubles (Shadow Mountain, June 19, 2014 ISBN 978-1573454124 )
- The Best-Kept Secrets of Parenting: 18 Principles That Can Change Everything with Jerrick Robbins (Deseret Book Company, July 15, 2014, ISBN 978-1942672586)
- How to Hug a Hedgehog: 12 Keys for Connecting with Teens with Jerrick Robbins (Deseret Book Company, October 7, 2014, ISBN 978-1939629197)
- Filled with Mercy: Daily Reflections On the Atonement (2014)
- The Continuous Atonement for Teens (2015)
- Practicing for Heaven: The Parable of the Piano Lessons (2015)
- A Year of Powerful Prayer (2016)
- Changed Through His Grace (Deseret Book Company, February 27, 2017, ISBN 978-1629722863)
- Because of the Messiah in a Manger (2018)
- Come Unto Me: Illuminating the Savior's Life, Mission, Parables, and Miracles (2018)
- Born to Change the World: Your Part in Gathering Israel (Deseret Book Company, May 13, 2019, ISBN 978-1629725895)
- Because of the Christ on Calvary (Deseret Book Company, March 2, 2020, ISBN 978-1629727486)

=== Children's books ===
- Hip, Hip, Hooray! for Annie McRae with Julie Olson (Deseret Book Company, March 12, 2019, ISBN 978-1586850586)
