= F. Melvin Hammond =

American religious leader and politician

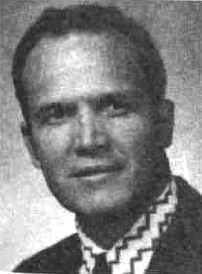
- Hammond while a professor at Ricks College

Second Quorum of the Seventy
- April 1, 1989 – April 3, 1993
- Called by: Ezra Taft Benson
- End reason: Transferred to First Quorum of the Seventy

First Quorum of the Seventy
- April 3, 1993 – October 1, 2005
- Called by: Ezra Taft Benson
- End reason: Granted general authority emeritus status

Emeritus General Authority
- October 1, 2005
- Called by: Gordon B. Hinckley

Personal details
- Born: Floyd Melvin Hammond; December 19, 1933 (age 92); Blackfoot, Idaho, United States

Floyd Melvin ("Mel") Hammond (born December 19, 1933) was an Idaho politician and has been a general authority of the Church of Jesus Christ of Latter-day Saints (LDS Church) since 1989. He was the nineteenth general president of the church's Young Men organization from 2001 to 2004.

Hammond was born in Blackfoot, Idaho. He served as an LDS Church missionary in the Spanish–American Mission from 1954 to 1956. Hammond attended Ricks College and Brigham Young University (BYU). After graduating from BYU, Hammond became a professor of religion at Ricks College in 1966. He was a member of the Idaho House of Representatives from 1969 to 1984 and served as House Minority Leader for three terms.

Before his call as a general authority, Hammond served in the LDS Church as a bishop, stake president, and regional representative. In 1984, Hammond became president of the church's Bolivia Cochabamba Mission. In 1989, he became a member of the Second Quorum of the Seventy. In 1993, he was transferred to the First Quorum of the Seventy, where he served until being designated as an emeritus general authority in 2005.

From 1997 to 1998, Hammond was second counselor to Jack H. Goaslind in the Young Men General Presidency. From 1998 to 2001, he served as first counselor to general president Robert K. Dellenbach. In 2001, Hammond succeeded Dellenbach as the organization's general president. Hammond served until 2004, when he was succeeded by Charles W. Dahlquist II. Hammond was the last general authority of the church to serve as the Young Men General President. From 2005 to 2008, Hammond served as president of the Washington D.C. Temple.

In 2003, Hammond was awarded the Silver Buffalo Award by the Boy Scouts of America for his work to incorporate Scouting into the LDS Church's Young Men program.

Hammond is married to Bonnie Sellers and they are the parents of six children.

The Church of Jesus Christ of Latter-day Saints titles
Preceded by Robert K. Dellenbach	Young Men General President; 2001–2004	Succeeded by Charles W. Dahlquist II
