= Larry M. Gibson =

American businessman (born 1947)

Larry Miner Gibson (born February 26, 1947) is an American businessman and was a member of the general presidency of the Young Men organization of the Church of Jesus Christ of Latter-day Saints (LDS Church) from 2009 until 2015.

Gibson was born in Boulder City, Nevada. From 1966 to 1968, he was a missionary for the LDS Church in the church's British South Mission. Gibson attended Brigham Young University and in 1985 founded Dentrix; he was the chief executive officer of Dentrix until it was purchased by Henry Schein in 1997. After the purchase, Gibson became a vice president and the chief technology officer of Henry Schein.

== LDS Church service ==
In the LDS Church, Gibson has been a stake president and a bishop. At the April 2009 general conference of the LDS Church, Gibson was accepted as the first counselor to David L. Beck in the general presidency of the Young Men. Gibson served in this capacity until Beck was released in April 2015.

== Personal life ==
Gibson married Shirley Barton on September 6, 1968 in the Manti Utah Temple. They have six children and live in Highland, Utah.

== See also ==
- List of general officers of The Church of Jesus Christ of Latter-day Saints
