= Robert K. Dellenbach =

American Mormon leader (born 1937)

Second Quorum of the Seventy
- March 31, 1990 – June 6, 1992
- Called by: Ezra Taft Benson
- End reason: Transferred to First Quorum of the Seventy

First Quorum of the Seventy
- June 6, 1992 – October 6, 2007
- Called by: Ezra Taft Benson
- End reason: Granted general authority emeritus status

Emeritus General Authority
- October 6, 2007
- Called by: Gordon B. Hinckley

Personal details
- Born: Robert Kent Dellenbach; May 10, 1937 (age 88); Salt Lake City, Utah, United States

Robert Kent Dellenbach (born May 10, 1937) is an American educational administrator and religious leader who has been a general authority of the Church of Jesus Christ of Latter-day Saints (LDS Church) since 1990. He was the church's eighteenth general president of the Young Men organization from 1998 to 2001.

Dellenbach was born in Salt Lake City and raised in Clinton, Utah. After high school, he served as an LDS Church missionary in West Germany for 30 months. Upon returning to the United States, Dellenbach earned a bachelor's degree from the University of Utah and an MBA degree from Brigham Young University. Dellenbach became a vice president with the University of Alaska Fairbanks and later became president of the Alaska Methodist University (now Alaska Pacific University) in Anchorage. He served as president of that university from July 1975 to July 1976. At the end of his term, the university suspended all operations for a year. He also worked for the Salk Institute for Biological Studies in La Jolla, California, and at the Institute for Advanced Technology of Control Data Corporation in Rockville, Maryland.

== LDS Church service ==
Prior to his call as a general authority, Dellenbach served in the LDS Church as a bishop, stake president, and regional representative. He was also president of the church's Germany Düsseldorf and Germany Munich missions. In 1990, he became a member of the Second Quorum of the Seventy. In 1992, he was transferred to the First Quorum of the Seventy.

In 1998, Dellenbach succeeded Jack H. Goaslind as the Young Men General President. Dellenbach had twice been Goaslind's second counselor (1990–91; 1997) and had twice been his first counselor (1991–92; 1997–98). As the Young Men General President, Dellenbach encouraged local units to adopt the venture program. He was released from this responsibility in 2001 and was succeeded by his own first counselor, F. Melvin Hammond.

During his tenure as a general authority, Dellenbach served in a number of area presidencies, including Europe, based in Frankfurt, Germany, and the Pacific Islands, based in Auckland, New Zealand.

In October 2007, Dellenbach was designated as an emeritus general authority. Since then he has served as the LDS Church's official liaison to the Salvation Army, Utah Chapter. Dellenbach was the moving force behind the building of the Monson Scout Lodge at the Hinckley Scout Ranch in Utah.

The Church of Jesus Christ of Latter-day Saints titles
Preceded by Jack H. Goaslind	General President of the Young Men; 1998–2001	Succeeded by F. Melvin Hammond
