= San José Costa Rica Temple =

LDS Church temple

- Interactive map of San José Costa Rica Temple
- Number: 87
- Dedication: 4 June 2000, by James E. Faust
- Site: 1.93 acres (0.78 ha)
- Floor area: 10,700 ft^{2} (990 m^{2})
- Height: 71 ft (22 m)
- Official website • News & images

Church chronology
| ← Montréal Québec Temple | San José Costa Rica Temple | → Fukuoka Japan Temple |

Additional information
- Announced: 17 March 1999, by Gordon B. Hinckley
- Groundbreaking: 24 April 1999, by Lynn G. Robbins
- Open house: 20–27 May 2000
- Current president: Enrique Alberto Flores Garcia
- Designed by: Álvaro Íñigo and Church A&E Services
- Location: San José, Costa Rica
- Coordinates: 9°59′11.10480″N 84°11′5.391600″W
- Exterior finish: Blanco Guardiano white marble from Torreón, Mexico
- Design: Classic modern, single-spire design
- Baptistries: 1
- Ordinance rooms: 2 (two-stage progressive)
- Sealing rooms: 2

The San José Costa Rica Temple is a temple of the Church of Jesus Christ of Latter-day Saints in Belén, Costa Rica. The intent to build the temple was announced on March 17, 1999, by the church's First Presidency. It is the first in Costa Rica, the second in Central America, and the church's 87th operating temple worldwide.

The temple has a single spire with an angel Moroni statue and an exterior of Blanco Guardiano white marble. The temple was designed by architect Alvaro Inigo in collaboration with church architectural and engineering personnel, using a classic modern design. A groundbreaking ceremony, to signify the beginning of construction, was held on April 24, 1999, conducted by Lynn G. Robbins of the Seventy and first counselor in the church's Central America Area. The temple was dedicated on June 4, 2000, by James E. Faust, second counselor in the First Presidency.

== History ==
Starting in the 1940s, Latter-day Saints who lived and worked in Costa Rica began to hold meetings, with missionaries arriving in the area in 1946. The church first saw the organization of small groups of members into branches. throughout Costa Rica in the 1960s, becoming a base for the church's operations in South America as it continued to grow. The first stake was created in 1977, and at the time church membership was around 3,800 members in the country. By 1986, the country had 7,100 church members, with 25,000 by 1994.

In January 1997, church president Gordon B. Hinckley visited Costa Rica during a tour of Central America, and spoke to members about the importance of being sealed in temples. The First Presidency then announced the San José Costa Rica Temple on March 17, 1999, through letters to local priesthood leaders.

On April 24, 1999, the groundbreaking ceremony took place for the temple. Lynn G. Robbins of the Seventy and first counselor in the Central America Area presidency presided over the ceremony. The groundbreaking was held on the same day as the groundbreaking for the Copenhagen Denmark Temple. In his remarks at the ceremony, Robbins emphasized that the temple is a symbol of celestial living and that worthiness to enter the temple serves as an indicator of spiritual preparedness. Julio E. Alvarado of the Seventy, second counselor in the area presidency, noted that construction was expected to be completed within one year.

The temple was constructed on a 2-acre property located in La Ribera, Belén, in the province of Heredia. The dimensions of the temple measure 149 feet by 77 feet.

Following construction, a public open house was held from May 20 to May 27, 2000, with about 18,840 people touring the temple. The temple was dedicated on June 4, 2000, by James E. Faust, second counselor in the First Presidency. The dedication took place over three sessions, with a total of 3,985 members attending. The temple was dedicated on the same day as the Montreal Quebec Temple, marking the fourth occasion when two temples were dedicated on the same day. At the dedication, it was estimated that 500 members from Panama and 150 members from Nicaragua attended.

Before the temple was built in Costa Rica, members had to travel to the Guatemala City Guatemala Temple, which required crossing three international borders. The completion of the San José Costa Rica Temple eliminated this long-distance and expensive travel requirement, making temple worship significantly more accessible to members in the region.

In 2020, like all the church's others, the San José Costa Rica Temple was closed for a time in response to the COVID-19 pandemic.

== Design and architecture ==
The temple is on a 2-acre plot in La Ribera, Belén, in the province of Heredia. It includes a distribution center on site.

The structure uses a classic modern architectural design. It was designed by architect Alvaro Inigo, along with church personnel. The exterior uses Blanco Guardiano white marble, and it has a single attached spire with an angel Moroni statue on the top. The overall dimensions of the building are 149 feet by 77 feet, for a total floor area of 10,700 square feet. The temple has two instruction rooms, two sealing rooms, and a baptistry.

== Temple leadership and admittance ==
=== Temple presidency ===
The church's temples are directed by a temple president and matron, each typically serving for a term of three years. The president and matron oversee the administration of temple operations and provide guidance and training for both temple patrons and staff. Serving from 2000 to 2003, Clarence G. Lunt was the first president, with Dolores (Lorie) R. Lunt serving as matron.. As of 2024, Enrique A. Garcia is the president, with Anayancy M. de Flores serving as matron.

=== Admittance ===
Following completion of construction, a public open house was held from May 20 to May 27, 2000. Like all the church's temples, it is not used for Sunday worship services. To members of the church, temples are regarded as sacred houses of the Lord. Once dedicated, only church members with a current temple recommend can enter for worship.

== See also ==

Temples in Central America
= Operating
= Under construction
= Announced
= Temporarily Closed

- Comparison of temples of The Church of Jesus Christ of Latter-day Saints
- List of temples of The Church of Jesus Christ of Latter-day Saints
- List of temples of The Church of Jesus Christ of Latter-day Saints by geographic region
- Temple architecture (Latter-day Saints)

== Additional reading ==
- "Temple dedications planned", Church News, April 8, 2000
- Swensen, Jason (June 10, 2000), "A new landmark by shining seas", Church News
- Swensen, Jason (July 8, 2000), "Costa Rica: Land of peace, blessings", Church News
