= Tad R. Callister =

American religious leader (1945–2025)

- Callister in 2014

Presidency of the Seventy
- August 1, 2011 – April 5, 2014
- Called by: Thomas S. Monson
- End reason: Released as general authority; called as general president of the Sunday School

Second Quorum of the Seventy
- April 5, 2008 – April 5, 2014
- Called by: Thomas S. Monson
- End reason: Released as general authority; called as general president of the Sunday School

Personal details
- Born: Tad Richards Callister; December 17, 1945; Glendale, California, U.S.
- Died: October 9, 2025 (aged 79); Bountiful, Utah, U.S.
- Alma mater: New York University School of Law (LL.M.); UCLA School of Law (J.D.); Brigham Young University (B.S.)
- Spouse(s): Kathryn Louise Saporiti
- Children: 6

Tad Richards Callister (December 17, 1945 – October 9, 2025) was an American religious leader who was the 21st Sunday School General President of the Church of Jesus Christ of Latter-day Saints (LDS Church) from 2014 to 2019. He served previously in the church as a general authority from 2008 to 2014, including as a member of the Presidency of the Seventy from 2011 to 2014.

Callister was born in Glendale, California to Effie Norine Richards and Reed Eddington Callister. His parents were both natives of Salt Lake City. Reed Callister served an LDS Church mission in the United Kingdom. Callister's mother, Norine, was a daughter of LeGrand Richards, who was the LDS Church's Presiding Bishop when Callister was born and later served as a member of the Quorum of the Twelve Apostles. At the time Callister's parents married in 1932, LeGrand Richards was their stake president in southern California.

During the mid-1960s, Callister served as an LDS Church missionary in the Eastern Atlantic States Mission, based in Washington, D.C. He earned a bachelor's degree in accounting from Brigham Young University (BYU), a Juris Doctor degree from UCLA, and a master of laws degree from New York University, specializing in tax law. Callister spent his career as a lawyer in southern California. Callister also served for a time as president of the Verdugo Hills Council of the Boy Scouts of America. Callister was the recipient of the 2019 "Patrons of the Arts" award presented by the Inspirational Arts Association based in Salt Lake City, Utah.

== LDS Church service ==
He previously served in the LDS Church as a bishop, stake president, regional representative, and area seventy. In 2001, Callister helped release a booklet on reaching out to non-members called "Doctrine of Inclusion" and stated, "We're imperfect people...[but] we want it to be said that we're the best neighbors in the world." From 2005 to 2008 he served as president of the church's Canada Toronto East Mission. In 2008, while serving in Canada, he was called as a general authority and member of the Second Quorum of the Seventy. He later served first as a counselor and then as president of the Pacific Area, residing in Auckland and overseeing the LDS Church's operations in New Zealand, Australia, and the islands of the Pacific. In 2011, he was appointed a member of the church's seven-man Presidency of the Seventy, replacing Claudio R. M. Costa.

At the church's April 2014 general conference, Callister was released as a general authority and from the Presidency of the Seventy; the resulting vacancy in the Presidency of the Seventy was filled by Lynn G. Robbins. Callister was simultaneously called as the general president of the church's Sunday School, succeeding Russell T. Osguthorpe. Callister selected John S. Tanner and Devin G. Durrant as his counselors. In 2015, he was quoted on the topics of morality and modesty in The Washington Post.

In May 2015, the church announced that Tanner had been appointed the next president of Brigham Young University-Hawaii. As a result, in June 2015 Durrant was called as first counselor, with Brian K. Ashton succeeding Durrant as second counselor. While Callister was serving as Sunday School General President, the church shifted to use of the "Come, Follow Me" curriculum.

Consistent with recent practice of the church's organizational presidencies serving for 5 years, Callister and his counselors were released in April 2019, with Mark L. Pace called as the new Sunday School General President. As with others previously released from the Second Quorum of the Seventy, the church refers to Callister as an emeritus general authority.

== Personal life and death ==
Callister met his wife, Kathryn Louise Saporiti, while they were students at BYU. They were married in 1968 and are the parents of six children.

His mother-in-law was a lifelong member of the church. His father-in-law, Angelo Louis Saporiti, joined the church while serving in the military in Hawaii some time after he had married.

Callister's older brother, Douglas L. Callister, was a member of the Second Quorum of the Seventy from 2000 to 2009.

Callister died on October 9, 2025, at the age of 79.

== Bibliography ==
- Callister, Tad R. (2000), The Infinite Atonement, Salt Lake City, Utah: Deseret Book, ISBN 1573456233
- Callister, Tad R. (2006), The Inevitable Apostasy and the Promised Restoration, Salt Lake City, Utah: Deseret Book, ISBN 1590385497
- Callister, Tad R. (2015), The Blueprint of Christ's Church, Salt Lake City, Utah: Deseret Book, ISBN 1629720216
- Callister, Tad R. (2019), A Case for the Book of Mormon, Salt Lake City, Utah: Deseret Book, ISBN 162972565X
- Callister, Tad R. (2021), America's Choice: A Nation Under God or Without God?, Springville, UT: Cedar Fort, Inc., ISBN 978-1-64952-892-6
- Callister, Tad R. (2023), America's Destiny: Choosing God's Will or Ours, Springville, UT: Cedar Fort, Inc., ISBN 978-1-46213-133-4
