= Karl Ricks Anderson =

American historian (born 1937)

Karl Ricks Anderson (born 1937) is a Latter-day Saint historian whose specialty is the Kirtland period in the history of the Latter Day Saint movement. He is a brother of Richard Lloyd Anderson and they were the second recipients of the Junius F. Wells Award from the Mormon Historic Sites Foundation in 2006.

Anderson was born in Salt Lake City, Utah and grew up in Ogden, Utah. He served as a Mormon missionary in the Swiss–Austrian Mission of the Church of Jesus Christ of Latter-day Saints (LDS Church) from 1957 to 1960.

Anderson earned a bachelor's degree and a masters in business administration from the University of Utah. He has spent most of his life since that time in the eastern United States, particularly Michigan and Ohio. He spent most of his career working for Borg-Warner.

In the late 1970s, Anderson served as president of the LDS Church's Cleveland Ohio Stake when its boundaries included Kirtland. Anderson later served as a regional representative of the Twelve. For a time, he served as a counselor in the Ohio Cleveland Mission presidency. He has also served as the area family history advisor for the North America North East Area of the church. Most recently, he served as the patriarch of the Kirtland Ohio Stake.

Anderson has been involved heavily with the Church Educational System (CES), having taught early morning seminary for 15 years and institute for about 25 years.

Anderson has also served as the secretary of the Joseph and Hyrum Smith Foundation.

Anderson has been key to the acquiring of many of the properties the LDS Church owns in Kirtland. He has also written the following books about Kirtland; Joseph Smith's Kirtland: Eyewitness Accounts and The Savior in Kirtland. He has also written many articles that have been published in such works as the Encyclopedia of Mormonism.
