= Montreal Quebec Temple =

Latter-day Saint temple in Quebec, Canada

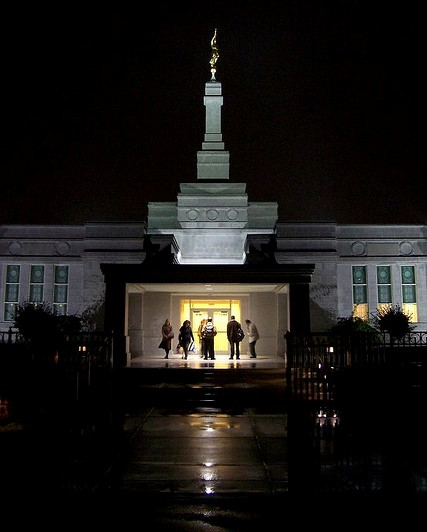
- Interactive map of Montreal Quebec Temple
- Number: 86
- Dedication: 4 June 2000, by Gordon B. Hinckley
- Site: 2.4 acres (0.97 ha)
- Floor area: 11,550 ft^{2} (1,073 m^{2})
- Height: 71 ft (22 m)
- Official website • News & images

Church chronology
← Villahermosa Mexico Temple	Montreal Quebec Temple	→ San José Costa Rica Temple

Additional information
- Announced: 6 August 1998, by Gordon B. Hinckley
- Groundbreaking: 9 April 1999, by Gary J. Coleman
- Open house: 20–27 May 2000; 5–14 November 2015
- Rededicated: 22 November 2015, by Henry B. Eyring
- Current president: Sterling Dietze
- Designed by: Andrij Serbyn, Fichten Soiferman and Church A&E Services
- Location: Longueuil, Quebec, Canada
- Coordinates: 45°33′48.00600″N 73°29′26.21760″W
- Exterior finish: Bethel white granite from northern Vermont
- Design: Classic modern, single-spire design
- Baptistries: 1
- Ordinance rooms: 2 (two-stage progressive)
- Sealing rooms: 2

The Montreal Quebec Temple is the 86th operating temple of the Church of Jesus Christ of Latter-day Saints, and is located in Longueuil, Quebec, across the St. Lawrence River from Montreal. The intent to construct the temple was announced on August 6, 1998, by church president Gordon B. Hinckley during a visit to Canada. It became the first temple built in Quebec and the sixth in Canada. The temple has a single spire with a gold-leafed statue of the angel Moroni on its top, and is constructed from Bethel white granite. It was designed by architect Andrij Serbyn of Sichten Soiferman and the church's architectural services group, using a classic modern style. A groundbreaking ceremony was held on April 9, 1999, led by Gary J. Coleman, a church general authority. The temple was dedicated on June 4, 2000.

From 2014 to 2015, the temple underwent extensive renovations due to water damage, including structural upgrades, new ordinance room murals, and remediation efforts. It was rededicated on November 22, 2015, by Henry B. Eyring of the church's First Presidency. To celebrate the rededication, more than 400 youth participated in a cultural event titled Je me souviens, reflecting the area's rich spiritual and cultural legacy.

== History ==
The temple was announced by church president Gordon B. Hinckley on August 6, 1998, during a visit to Montreal as part of a nine-day trip to Canada. The temple was built on a 2.4-acre (0.97 ha) property located at 1450 Boulevard Marie-Victorin in Longueuil, Quebec, near the shore of the St. Lawrence River. The temple's floor plan is 11,550 square feet.

The groundbreaking ceremony took place on April 9, 1999, marking the commencement of construction. This ceremony was presided over by Gary J. Coleman, a counselor in the presidency of the North America Northeast Area, and attended by more than 450 local church members and community leaders. The temple was built on the site of a former automobile dealership, which was demolished to make way for construction. The dealership's garage was still standing when ground was broken for the temple.

Following completion of construction, the church announced the public open house that was held from May 20 to May 27, 2000, where approximately 10,000 people visited the temple.

The Montreal Quebec Temple was dedicated on June 4, 2000, by Hinckley, who also placed the cornerstone and had help from local children in placing the mortar. About 6,000 members attended the four dedicatory sessions. At the time of its dedication, the temple served more than 12,200 church members from the Montréal; Ottawa, Ontario; Montpelier, Vermont; and upstate New York areas.

In 2020, like all the church's others, the Montreal Quebec Temple was temporarily closed in response to the COVID-19 pandemic.

== Design and architecture ==
The Montreal Quebec Temple has a classic modern architectural style, and was designed by architect Andrij Serbyn, Sichten Soiferman, and church architectural personnel, with William Treu as project manager, and Opron Inc. as the general contractor.

Located on a 2.4-acre (0.97 ha) plot in Longueuil, Quebec, the temple's landscaping includes gardens, grass, and trees. It is a single-story structure constructed from Bethel white granite quarried in northern Vermont, and has a central spire with a gold-leafed statue of the angel Moroni on its top. It has windows using blue and gold glass in geometric motifs, inspired by traditional metal grilles commonly seen in Montreal's historic architecture.

The temple is 10,700 square feet and has two ordinance rooms, two sealing rooms, and a baptistry. The interior design features include carved maple leaves and culturally significant floral motifs: the fleur-de-lis representing French heritage, the rose for the English, the thistle for the Scots, and the shamrock for the Irish. These were intended to acknowledge the local history and the temple's geographic and cultural setting.

== Renovation and cultural celebration ==
The Montreal Quebec Temple has undergone renovations to preserve its structural integrity and update facilities, including a renovation project that commenced on June 2, 2014, when it was closed due to extensive water damage. The original wood framing was replaced with reinforced concrete and steel to ensure long-term durability. Major repairs were carried out, including the addressing of a mold problem, and the ordinance rooms were updated with landscape murals. After renovations were complete, an open house was held from November 5–14, 2015 (excluding Sundays), where around 7,800 people attended.

The renovated temple was rededicated on November 22, 2015, by Henry B. Eyring, first counselor in the First Presidency. A cultural celebration was held the night before, featuring over 400 youth from Quebec and eastern Ontario. The performance, held in a local auditorium, was titled Je me souviens (“I remember”), and paid tribute to the spiritual and cultural legacy of the region through music, dance, and storytelling. The celebration reflected the church's efforts to engage with and celebrate the community's historical diversity and identity.

== Temple presidents and admittance ==
The church's temples are directed by a temple president and matron, each typically serving for a term of three years. The president and matron oversee the administration of temple operations and provide guidance and training for both temple patrons and staff.

Serving from 2000 to 2002, Scott H. Taggart was the president, with Lou C. Taggart serving as matron. As of 2025, Sterling H. Dietze is the president, with Greta Dietze serving as matron.

After original construction was completed, a public open house that was held from May 20 to May 27, 2000 (excluding Sundays). The temple was dedicated by church president Gordon B. Hinckley on June 4, 2000, in four sessions. After renovations, a second open house occurred from November 5–14, 2015 (excluding Sundays), with Henry B. Eyring doing the rededication.

Like all the church's temples, it is not used for Sunday worship services. To members of the church, temples are regarded as sacred houses of the Lord. Once dedicated, only church members with a current temple recommend can enter for worship.

== Gallery ==
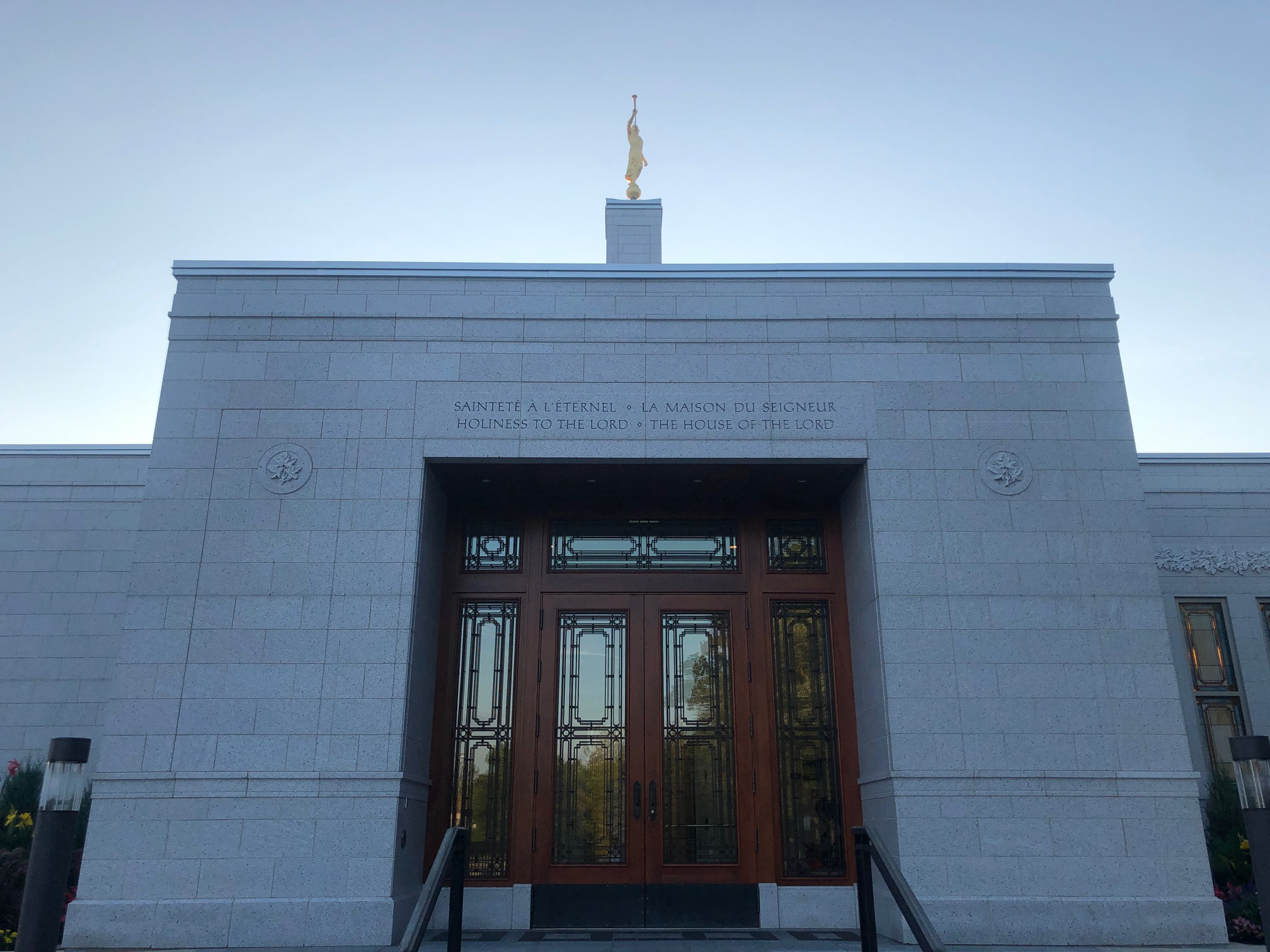
Temple entrance

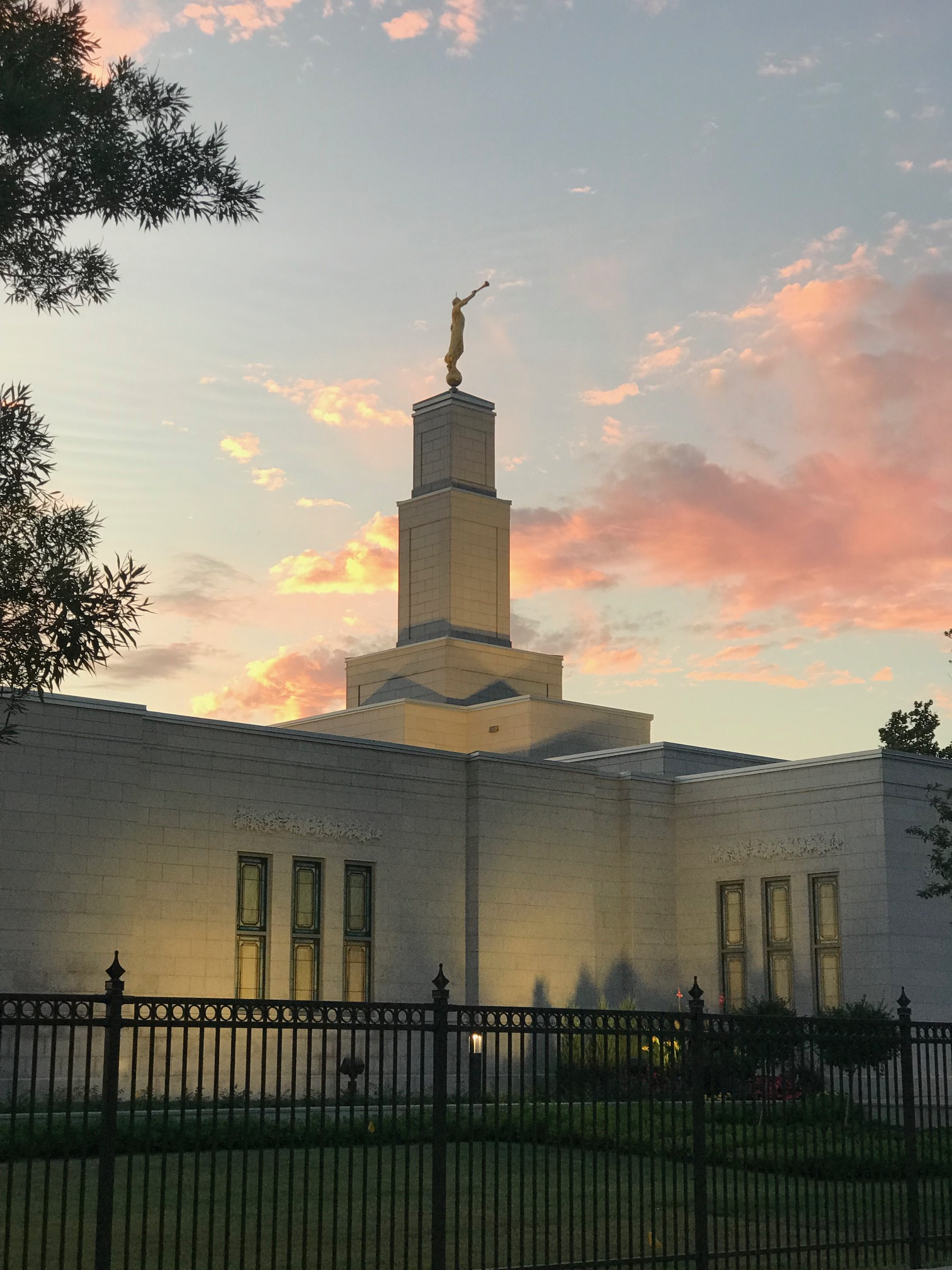
Temple at sunset, July 2019

== See also ==

Temples in Canada

Alberta Temples
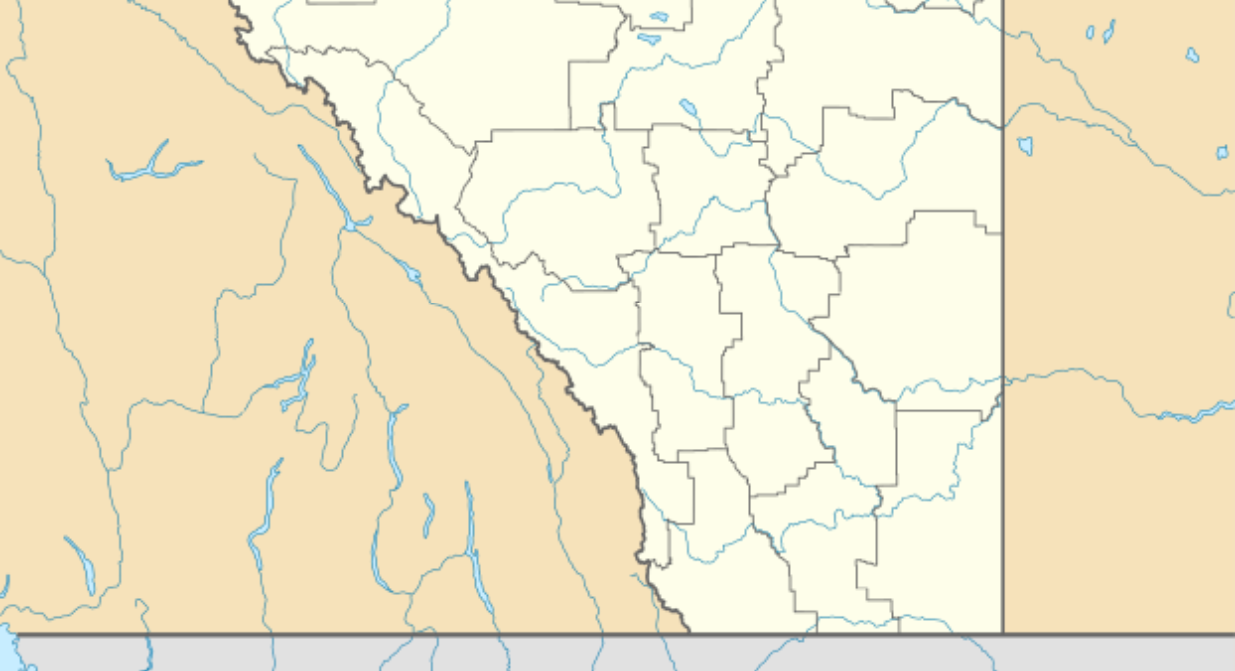
Temples in Alberta

= Operating
= Under construction
= Announced
= Temporarily Closed

- Comparison of temples of The Church of Jesus Christ of Latter-day Saints
- List of temples of The Church of Jesus Christ of Latter-day Saints
- List of temples of The Church of Jesus Christ of Latter-day Saints by geographic region
- Temple architecture (Latter-day Saints)
- The Church of Jesus Christ of Latter-day Saints in Canada

== Additional reading ==
- "Temple dedications planned", Church News, April 8, 2000
- Dockstader, Julie (June 10, 2000), "Pres. Monson returns to land, people he loves", Church News
- Dockstader, Julie (June 10, 2000), "Montreal temple highlight of 40 years of progress", Church News
- Dockstader, Julie (July 22, 2000), "Meeting the world in Montreal", Church News
