= J. Reuben Clark III =

J. Reuben Clark III (November 23, 1908 – August 13, 1992) was a professor of classical languages and also French at Brigham Young University. At various times he served as head of the Asian and Classical Languages Department and of the Classical and Biblical Languages Department at that university.

== Background ==
J. Reuben Clark III was the only son of J. Reuben Clark Jr. and his wife Luacine Savage Clark. He was born in Salt Lake City, and largely raised in that city although he spent some of his youth in Washington D.C. while his father worked for the federal government there. Clark served a mission for the Church of Jesus Christ of Latter-day Saints in France. He received his bachelor's degree from the University of Utah and did graduate studies at Columbia University.

Clark married Emily Anderson in the Salt Lake Temple in 1934. Among other positions in the LDS Church, he served as a bishop and stake president of BYU wards. Among those who studied Latin under Clark was Richard Lloyd Anderson.

BYU has a J. Reuben Clark III Lecture in the Classics and the Classical Tradition named in his honor.

== Sources ==
- Deseret News obituary for Clark
- BY High alumni and faculty page entry for Clark
