= LeGrand R. Curtis =

American Mormon leader

Second Quorum of the Seventy
- March 31, 1990 – September 30, 1995
- Called by: Ezra Taft Benson
- End reason: Honorably released

Personal details
- Born: LeGrand Raine Curtis; May 22, 1924; Salt Lake City, Utah
- Died: December 19, 2010 (aged 86)

LeGrand Raine Curtis Sr. (May 22, 1924 – December 19, 2010) was a general authority of the Church of Jesus Christ of Latter-day Saints (LDS Church) from 1990 to 1995. He was a member of the Second Quorum of the Seventy; he also served as a counselor in the Young Men general presidency from 1990 to 1991 and from 1972 to 1974.

Curtis was born in Salt Lake City, Utah. He was named after LeGrand Richards, who was bishop of the Sugar House Ward where his parents lived. His father was a counselor in the bishopric to Richards.

Curtis learned to play the organ at age 12 and was ward organist from age 14 until he moved away to go to dental school. He did his undergraduate studies at the University of Utah. He then joined the United States Army during World War II through which he began his studies in dentistry. On June 1, 1944 Curtis married Patricia Glade, who he had known since junior high school, in the Salt Lake Temple. Patricia was the daughter of Salt Lake radio pioneer and politician Earl J. Glade and his wife, Sarah Elizabeth R. Glade. They became the parents of eight children.

After his marriage, Curtis lived in Kansas City, Missouri, Corpus Christi, Texas and Norfolk, Virginia. When the Army discontinued its dental training, Curtis was allowed to leave to complete dental school. He studied dentistry at the University of Kansas City (now the University of Missouri at Kansas City). While in Dental School he worked as an organist at a Prysbetyrian Church in the Kansas City area. He then returned to the military, serving in the United States Navy.

Among other positions, Curtis served in the LDS Church as a branch president, bishop, stake president, regional representative, stake patriarch and as president of the Florida Tallahassee Mission. After being released as a general authority, Curtis served as president of the Jordan River Utah Temple from 1996 to 1999.

His son, LeGrand R. Curtis Jr., was called as a member of the First Quorum of the Seventy in April 2011.
