= Milton H. Hardy =

American educator (1844–1905)

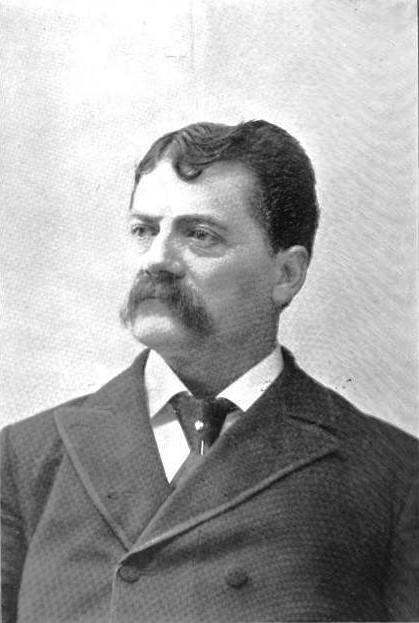

Personal details
- Born: Milton Henry Hardy; September 26, 1844; Bradford, Massachusetts, United States
- Died: August 23, 1905 (aged 60); Provo, Utah, United States
- Resting place: Provo City Cemetery; 40.225°N 111.644°W
- Spouse(s): Elizabeth "Libbie" Smoot
- Children: 5

Milton Henry Hardy (September 26, 1844 – August 23, 1905) was an American educator and was the founder of and a member of the inaugural general superintendency of the Young Men's Mutual Improvement Association (YMMIA) of the Church of Jesus Christ of Latter-day Saints (LDS Church). From 1876 to 1880, Hardy was the first assistant to Junius F. Wells, the first president of the YMMIA.

== Early life ==
Hardy was born in Bradford, Massachusetts, United States. In 1852, his family emigrated to Utah Territory after converting to Mormonism. Hardy was baptized into the LDS Church on 17 October 1852.

== Church service ==
From 1871 to 1873, Hardy was a LDS Church missionary in the United States. Beginning in 1875, church president Brigham Young asked Hardy, John Henry Smith, and B. Morris Young to tour the wards of the church and establish YMMIA programs in each of them. When this was completed, Young asked Junius F. Wells to be the inaugural general superintendent of the organization; Wells selected Hardy and Rodney C. Badger as his assistants. The superintendency served until 1880, when Wells was released and replaced with Wilford Woodruff. Hardy continued his involvement with the YMMIA, and from 1898 until his death, Hardy was a member of the general board of the YMMIA.

== Career ==
Hardy held a doctorate degree in biology and was one of the first instructors at Brigham Young Academy (BYA) in Provo, Utah Territory. From 1876 to 1888 and from 1891 to 1896, Hardy taught physiology and biology at BYA, and was an assistant principal under Karl G. Maeser. In the 1886–87 school year, Hardy became the first instructor to teach a course in psychology at an LDS Church-owned school.

Hardy served as Superintendent of the Utah State Insane Asylum from 1896 until 1905; he resigned in June 1905 due to health problems.

== Family and death ==
Hardy was married to Elizabeth "Libbie" Smoot and was the father of five children.

Hardy died in Provo, Utah.
