= Nu Skin Enterprises =

American multi-level marketing company

Coordinates: 40.233437°N 111.660171°W

Nu Skin Enterprises, Inc.

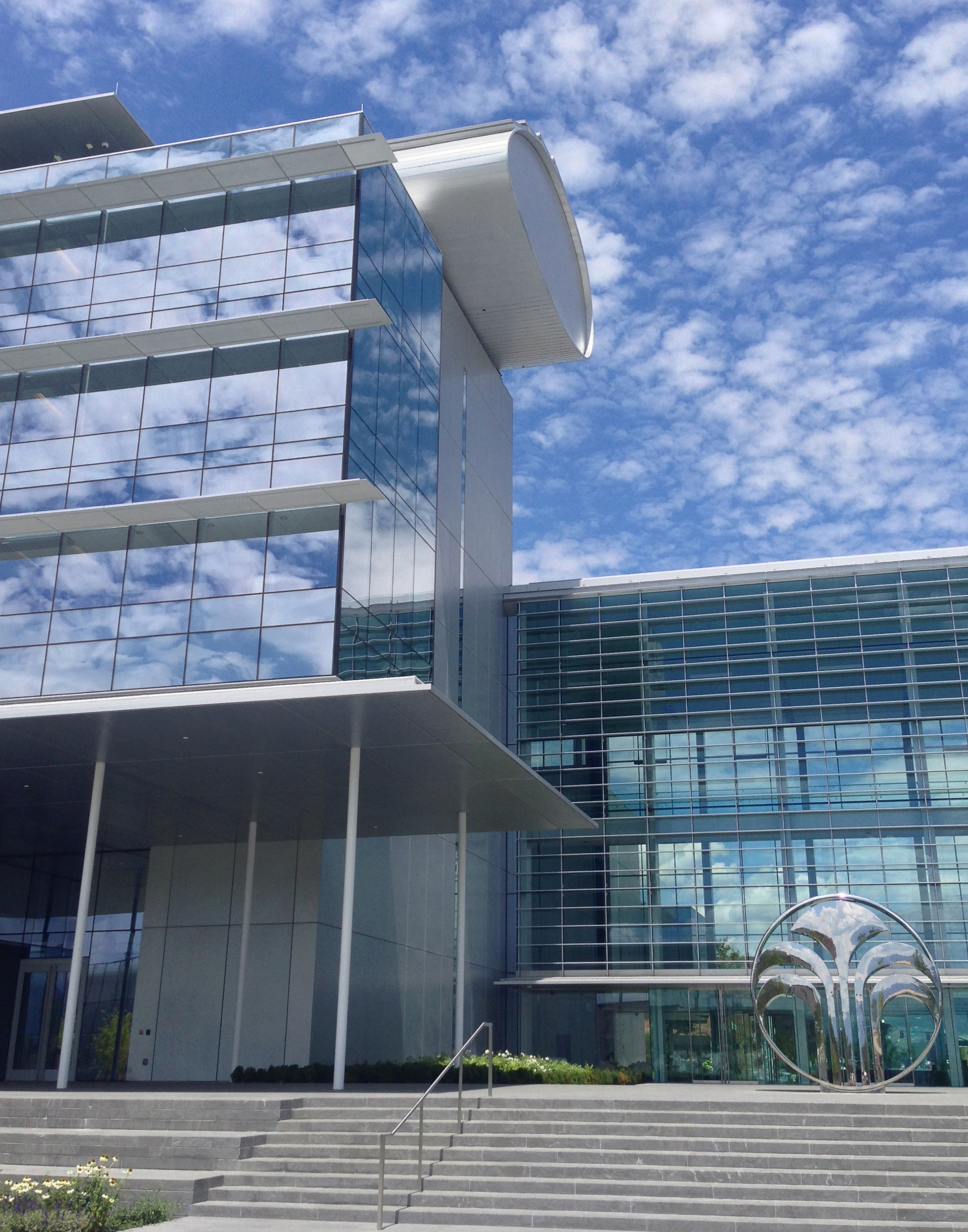
- Headquarters in Provo, Utah
- Type: Public
- Traded as: NYSE: NUS (Class A)
- Industry: Multilevel marketing, personal care products
- Founded: 1984; 42 years ago
- Founders: Blake Roney; Steven J. Lund; Sandie Tillotson; Nedra Roney
- Headquarters: Provo, Utah, United States
- Area served: Worldwide
- Key people: Steven J. Lund (Chairman); Ryan Napierski (President and CEO), Chayce Clark (COO)
- Products: Personal care; dietary supplements
- Brands: Nu Skin; Pharmanex
- Revenue: ▼US$1.73 billion (2024)
- Operating income: ▲US$66 million (2025)
- Net income: ▲US$160 million (2025)
- Total assets: ▼US$1.47 billion (2024)
- Total equity: ▲US$805 million (2025)
- Number of employees: 3,100 (2024)
- Website: nuskin.com

Nu Skin Enterprises, Inc. is an American multilevel marketing company that develops and sells personal care products and dietary and nutritional supplements. Under the Nu Skin and Pharmanex brands, the company sells its products in 54 markets through a network of approximately 1.2 million independent distributors. The company was founded in 1984 by Blake Roney, Nedra Roney, Sandie Tillotson, and Steven J. Lund.

== History ==
In 1984, Nu Skin founders Blake Roney, Nedra Roney, Sandie Tillotson, and Steven J. Lund launched a line of skincare products using only natural ingredients. The founders aimed to create skincare products and nutritional products without unnecessary fillers with the philosophy of “all of the good, none of the bad.”

The company first served the United States market and expanded operations to Canada in 1990. In 1991, the company began operations in Asia, starting in Hong Kong. In 1996, the company listed on the New York Stock Exchange.

In 1992, Nu Skin settled with five states that accused the company of deceptive advertising and overstating distributor income. In 1994, the company paid $1 million and signed a consent decree with the FTC prohibiting it from making deceptive product claims. In 1997, the company paid an additional $1.5 million to the FTC to settle allegations of unsubstantiated claims.

In 1998, Nu Skin acquired Generation Health, the parent company of the dietary supplement company Pharmanex. According to Women's Health Letter, the Pharmanex device was designed merely to help sell more supplements, since per Nu Skin's 2002 annual report, "as customers track their skin carotenoid content, we believe they will be motivated to consistently consume LifePak for longer periods of time."

In the late 1990s, Nu Skin invested in Big Planet, a multilevel marketing company selling Internet services. The New York Times wrote that Big Planet recruited people "even if they have little knowledge of the technology that they are supposed to be selling," with a Big Planet representative quoted: "I believe people who have never touched a computer before can become hugely wealthy in this business."

In 2009, Nu Skin began working with LifeGen Technologies, a genomics company based in Madison, Wisconsin. Nu Skin acquired LifeGen in December 2011. Nu Skin claims LifeGen's genetic database aided in the development of Nu Skin's products, launching the ageLOC brand.

In 2016, Nu Skin paid a $47 million class-action settlement, citing failure to disclose that its Chinese subsidiary did not register as the direct seller. Nu Skin paid $750k in fines to the United States Securities and Exchange Commission following allegations of a bribe that saw charity funds go to a Chinese politician.

In 2021, Nu Skin's subsidiary Rhyz Inc. acquired social commerce company Mavely and acquired Dallas-based skincare company BeautyBio in 2023. In 2025, the company sold the Mavely platform for five times what it paid for the company in 2021, in a $250 million transaction to Later, the Summit Partners company.

=== Products ===
Nu Skin was granted a patent on a device developed by Pharmanex called a "BioPhotonic Scanner", which is designed to measure the carotenoid level in skin. The company launched its ageLOC anti-aging brand in 2008.

In 2014, Nu Skin launched the Nu Skin Facial Spa which received FDA clearance for over-the-counter cosmetic use. In 2018, the company introduced the ageLOC LumiSpa, a dual-action skin care device that uses a soft silicone treatment head to gently cleanse away dirt, oil, and makeup.

Nu Skin launched ageLOC LumiSpa iO, the company's first connected device, in 2022. LumiSpa iO is a smart treatment and cleansing device for customized skin care, popularized by Venus Williams. Nu Skin launched Nu Colour “Lash + Brow” in 2023, marketed as free of prostaglandins. In 2022, Nu Skin launched a line of Nutricentials Bioadaptive Skin Care Pumps. In 2024, the company launched Nu Skin RenuSpa iO, an FDA-cleared microcurrent body device with a connected app to view live insights during treatment. RenuSpa iO is the company's first integrated beauty and wellness device. In 2024, Nu Skin launched MYND360 as a supplement and topicals product line for cognitive health.

== Reception ==
Nu Skin Enterprises' is a multi-level marketing business. Each distributor markets products directly to potential customers and may also recruit and train customers to become distributors. Distributors are paid on the retail markup on products they are able to sell, as well as a performance bonus based on the sales of recruited distributors. In the early 1990s, Nu Skin was investigated by Connecticut, Pennsylvania, Florida, Illinois, Ohio, and Michigan over allegations of misleading marketing practices. In 1992 the company settled with five of the states, admitted no wrongdoing but agreed to pay the states' investigative costs, refund distributors, and revamp its promotional practices. The Connecticut Attorney General did not agree to those terms and sued Nu Skin, alleging the company misled its distributors and operated a pyramid scheme. Nu Skin admitted to no wrongdoing or violation of law and settled with the state for $85k for consumer-protection programs.

In 1997, the Attorney General of Pennsylvania alleged in a lawsuit that Nu Skin operated a pyramid scheme through a subsidiary, QIQ Connections and that distributors paid for the right to market technology services that did not, in fact, exist. Nu Skin discontinued the QIQ subsidiary, allowing those who had paid QIQ to move to Big Planet, a Nu Skin investment marketing Internet technology. The president of Big Planet described the allegations as a matter of "a few distributors who in their enthusiasm have been overzealous in some of their marketing activities."

In 2010, Nu Skin was listed among Forbes "100 Most Trustworthy Companies".

In 2011, two Utah-incorporated business entities linked to top executives of Nu Skin each made a $1 million contribution to Restore Our Future, a Super PAC established by former aides to U.S. presidential candidate Mitt Romney to support his bid for the White House.

In 2012, Stanford University apologized for an misunderstanding following a cease and desist letter sent to halt the use of the name of one of its researchers, Dr. Stuart Kim, in Nu Skin's advertising. Also in 2012, Citron Research issued a report "stating that Nu Skin's sales model on mainland China, the fastest growing market in direct-selling, amounted to an illegal multilevel marketing scheme." Nu Skin dismissed the claims, calling its sales model in China "kosher" and stating that it had no plans to change its business model. In 2014, The Chinese government investigated Nu Skin following a People's Daily newspaper report calling it a "suspected illegal pyramid scheme." Following the investigation, the Chinese government fined Nu Skin for $540k due to illegal sales and making false product claims.

In February 2014, a press release shows a class action lawsuit filed in the U.S. District Court for the District of Utah against Nu Skin Enterprises on behalf of investors who acquired stock of the company from July 2013, to January 2014.

In a Last Week Tonight with John Oliver segment that covered multilevel marketing companies, Oliver criticized Nu Skin for the fact that in 2015, 93% of its distributors did not earn a commission check in a typical month. Nu Skin says it pays approximately 43 percent of its product revenue in sales compensation. In 2025, Nu Skin was named to USA Today's list of "best customer service."
