= Burton K. Farnsworth =

American politician (1890–1945)

Burton Kent Farnsworth (March 6, 1890 – September 27, 1945) was a Director of Secondary Education of Utah and a leader in the Church of Jesus Christ of Latter-day Saints (LDS Church).

Farnsworth was born in Beaver, Utah Territory. From 1909 to 1912, he was a LDS Church missionary in Samoa. After his mission, he obtained education degrees from Utah State Agricultural College and a doctorate from the University of California, Berkeley. He was a professor of education at Utah State, and from 1934 until his death was the Director of Secondary Education of Utah.

In the LDS Church, Farnsworth was a bishop in Fillmore, Utah, from 1928 to 1931, and from 1937 until his death was the second assistant George Q. Morris, the general superintendent of the Young Men's Mutual Improvement Association (YMMIA). He had joined the general board of the YMMIA in 1935.

Farnsworth died in Seattle, Washington, and was buried at Salt Lake City Cemetery. Farnsworth's papers are housed at the Harold B. Lee Library of Brigham Young University in Provo, Utah. He was married to Mabel Pearce and was the father of six children.
