= Stephen W. Owen =

Former LDS Church Young Men president

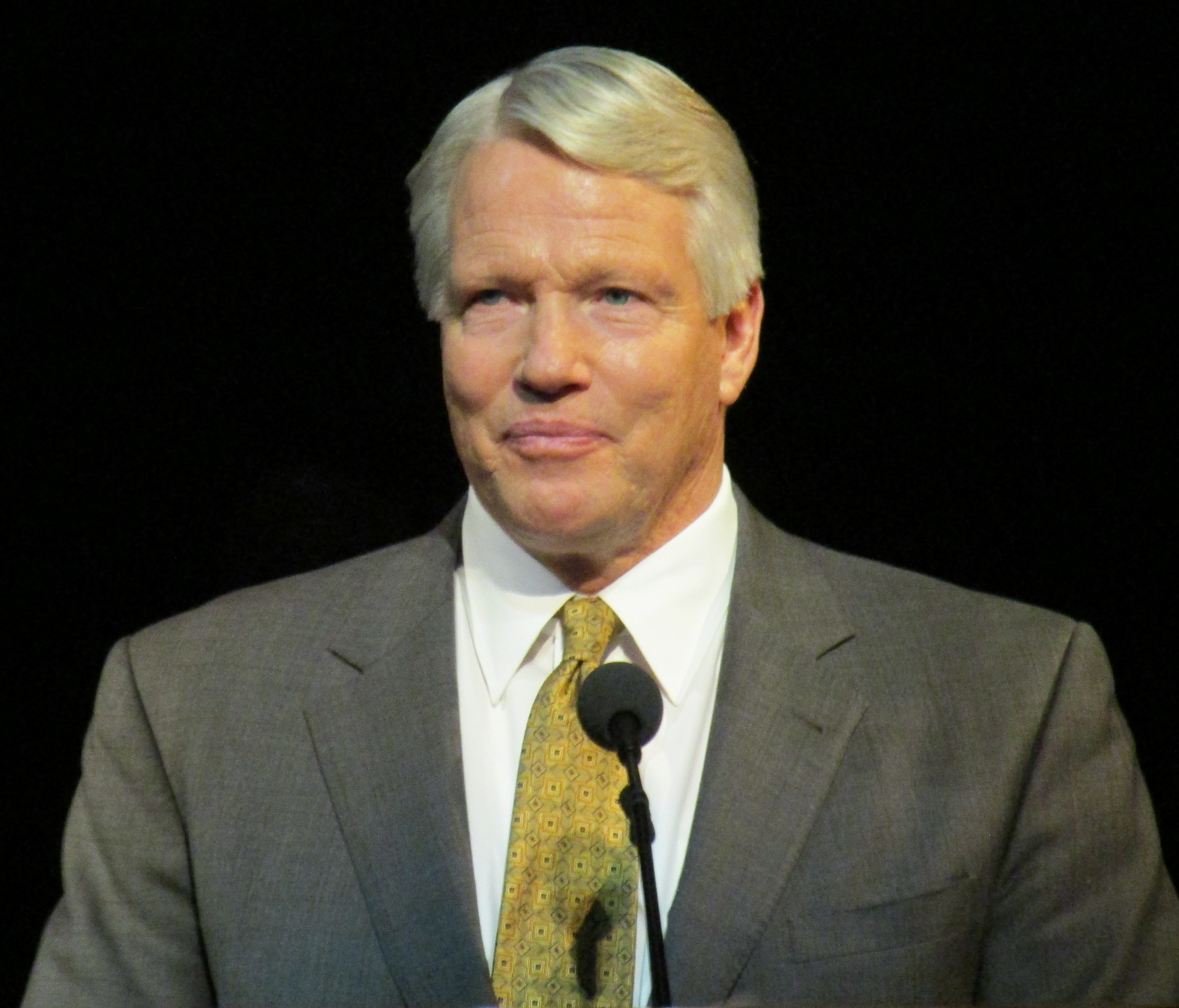
- Stephen W. Owen at BYU Devotional, 2018

22nd Young Men General President
- April 4, 2015 – April 4, 2020
- Called by: Thomas S. Monson
- Predecessor: David L. Beck
- Successor: Steven J. Lund

Personal details
- Born: March 22, 1958 (age 68); Salt Lake City, Utah, United States
- Education: Bachelor's degree
- Alma mater: University of Utah
- Website: Stephen W. Owen

Stephen W. Owen (born March 22, 1958) was the 22nd Young Men General President of the Church of Jesus Christ of Latter-day Saints (LDS Church) from 2015 to 2020.

Owen was born in Salt Lake City, Utah and obtained a bachelor's degree from the University of Utah. Owen and his wife, Jane, owned and operated a chain of Great Harvest Bread Company stores in Utah and Nevada.

== LDS Church service ==
Owen's church service includes serving as a full-time missionary in the Texas San Antonio Mission and as president of the California Arcadia Mission. He has also served as stake president, bishop, Scoutmaster, ward Young Men president, and elders quorum president. In 2018, Owen addressed the Brigham Young University student body in a campus devotional and emphasized the importance of gathering together, "I believe something powerful happens any time we gather as God’s covenant people, anywhere in the world, no matter how many people the gathering may include."

During his service as its general president, the LDS Church made significant changes to the Young Men program. A 2018 change allows boys to be ordained to the all-male priesthood at the beginning of the year in which they turn 12 years of age, rather than waiting for their actual birthday to become a deacon. Owen explains, "They progress together. This change helps in the process of conversion. It creates belonging." The LDS Church ended its 105-year partnership with the Boy Scouts of America at the end of 2019. Owen was involved in the introduction of new tools to prevent child abuse in the LDS Church including an online training that Owen called, "One important way we can help ensure our children have the loving parents and devoted leaders they deserve and need." The LDS Church also discontinued ward young men's presidencies and rolled out a new program for the children and youth of the LDS Church beginning January 1, 2020. The program introduced new initiatives including a theme to be recited by the young men and multi-day For the Strength of Youth conferences, patterned after Especially for Youth conferences.

In April 2020, Owen was released as Young General President and was succeeded by Steven J. Lund.

== Personal life ==
Owen is married to Jane Stringham and they are the parents of five children.

The Church of Jesus Christ of Latter-day Saints titles
Preceded by David L. Beck	General President of the Young Men; April 4, 2015 - April 4, 2020	Succeeded by Steven J. Lund
