= Covetrus =

American animal health company

Covetrus, Inc.
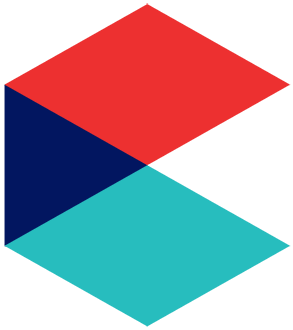
- Company type: Private
- Traded as: Nasdaq: CVET
- Industry: Animal health
- Headquarters: Portland, Maine, US
- Key people: Benjamin C. Wolin (president & CEO); Philip A. Laskawy (chairman)
- Revenue: ▲US$4,339 million (2021)
- Operating income: ▼US$ −69 million (2020)
- Net income: ▲US$108 million (2020)
- Total assets: ▲US$3,496 million (2020)
- Total equity: ▲US$1,573 million (2020)
- Owner: Clayton, Dubilier & Rice
- Number of employees: 5,500
- Website: covetrus.com

Covetrus, Inc. is an American company providing animal health products and related services. Until 2019, it was the animal health business of VetsFirstChoice, and Henry Schein, before being divested. In 2021, the company ranked 593 on the Fortune 1000 list of the largest United States corporations by total revenue.

== History ==
In 2006, Henry Schein acquired NLS Animal Health, a privately held veterinary distribution business.

In 2009, Henry Schein and Butler Animal Health Supply launched a joint venture Butler Schein Animal Health creating the largest veterinary sales and distribution company in the United States.

In 2012, Henry Schein acquired Netherlands-based AUV Veterinary Services for approximately $40 million.

In 2013, Butler Schein Animal Health was rebranded as Henry Schein Animal Health.

In 2015, Scil Animal Care merged with Henry Schein Animal Health.

In 2016, Henry Schein acquired RxWorks, a provider of veterinary practice management software.

In 2019, Henry Schein announced the spin-off of its animal health business. The spin-off was merged with Portland, Maine-based Vets First Choice and was called Covetrus. The company became listed on the Nasdaq with Henry Schein shareholders owning about 63% of the company, and Vet First Choice shareholders owning about 37% of it.

In 2021, online pet product retailer Chewy Inc. filed a lawsuit against Covetrus for allegedly illegally diverting potential purchases of pet medication and food away from Chewy and into sales for Covetrus.

== Privatization ==
On May 25, 2022, it was announced that Clayton, Dubilier & Rice and TPG Inc. would acquire the company for $4 billion. The acquisition was finalized in October, 2022.

== Products ==
Covetrus engages in the sale of animal health consumable goods to wholesale and retail customers. Its products include supply chain services, software, and prescription management. The company's software services business develops and provides veterinary practices with veterinary software systems including practice management software, data-driven applicants, and client communications tools. The company operates primarily in North America, Europe, and Asia-Pacific. 100,000 veterinary practices are served by Covetrus globally.
