= Rodney Badger =

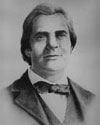
- Born: February 4, 1823; Waterford, Vermont, U.S.
- Died: April 29, 1853 (aged 30); Weber River, Utah, U.S.
- Resting place: Salt Lake City Cemetery
- Occupation: Sheriff Of Great Salt Lake County
- Known for: First Utah Law Enforcement Officer to Die in Duties

Rodney Badger (February 4, 1823 – April 29, 1853) was the first Utah law enforcement officer to die during the performance of his sworn duties. He died on April 29, 1853, trying to rescue a family whose wagon had overturned in the Weber River. He successfully rescued four children and their mother and died while trying to rescue two other children.

Badger was born in Waterford, Vermont, and was a convert to the Church of Jesus Christ of Latter Day Saints. Badger was a Mormon pioneer and arrived in the Salt Lake Valley with the first company on 24 July 1847. Badger was a special agent for the Perpetual Emigrating Fund Company and was a deputy sheriff of Salt Lake County. He was survived by his wife and four children and he is buried in Salt Lake City Cemetery.

== Early life ==
Rodney Badger was born in Waterford, Vermont, to parents John Badger and Lydia Chamberlain Badger on February 4, 1823. He had two younger siblings, John Badger and Lydia Badger. In Rodney's early teenage years, Mormon leader Heber C. Kimball preached in Vermont, and Lyman E. Johnson and Orson Pratt preached to and converted the Badger family to the Church of Jesus Christ of Latter Day Saints in Charleston, Vermont. The parents were baptized in July 1835.

The family later moved to Kirtland, Ohio, and then settled for a time in Montrose, Iowa. It was there that Rodney's father, John, died in 1838. The family then moved to Nauvoo, Illinois. On January 1, 1839, Rodney Badger was baptized at nearly 16 years old. Rodney's mother, Lydia, died in Nauvoo in September 1844.

Rodney married Nancy Garr in March 1845. Their first child, a daughter they named Nancy Maria, was born February 27, 1846, in La Harpe, Illinois.

In 1847, Rodney Badger was a member of the Brigham Young Vanguard Company, arriving in Salt Lake City, Utah, on July 24, 1847. In August of that year he went back to help other wagons of Mormon pioneers, including his young family, who had left Winter Quarters, Nebraska. Rodney met with his wife, father-in-law, and baby in September 1847, who were part of the Jedediah M. Grant Company moving to Utah. Rodney and Nancy settled in Salt Lake City in October 1847.

Over the next few years, Rodney Badger became Sheriff of Great Salt Lake County, a member of the Bishopric of the 15th ward, and Lieutenant of the Territorial Militia. On September 6, 1848, Rodney and Nancy had a son, Rodney Carlos. On October 26, 1850, they had another son, named George William. Two years later, July 27, 1852, the couple had another daughter, Charlotte Louise.

== Service and death ==
Rodney Badger served as Sheriff of Great Salt Lake County for several years.

Deputy Rodney Badger died on April 29, 1853, rescuing a family whose wagon had tipped in the Weber River in Utah. He saved four children and their mother, but died going back to save the other two children. One of the bodies of the children was found the next day, the other three months later by James H. Heath. It wasn't until October 19, 1854, Heath found the remains of Rodney Badger on a small island about 1 1/2 miles from where Deputy Badger had gone under the water the previous year.

Deputy Rodney Badger is buried in the Salt Lake City Cemetery.

On April 25, 1996, 143 years after he gave his life in the line of duty, the Salt Lake County Sheriff's Office posthumously awarded the Purple Heart and Medal of Honor to Rodney Badger and gave them to his descendants.

== Bibliography ==
https://history.churchofjesuschrist.org/overlandtravel/pioneers/342/rodney-badger

https://www.utahsfallen.org/rodney-badger/

https://newspapers.lib.utah.edu/details?id=2580119&q=rodney+badger&sort=rel&year_start=1850&year_end=1863

http://utah.untraveledroad.com/Summit/HeneferValley/13DSign.htm

https://history.churchofjesuschrist.org/overlandtravel/pioneers/342/rodney-badger

https://www.latterdaylight.com/question-of-the-day/2019/3/4/rodney-badger
