= Blake Roney =

American businessman (born 1958)

- Born: Blake Marshal Roney; March 19, 1958 (age 67); Santa Monica, California
- Occupations: Founder, Nu Skin Enterprises
- Spouse: Nancy Lee Watson Roney
- Children: 8
- Parent(s): Arden Ensley Roney and Norma Jeane Roney.
- Family: Sister: Nedra Roney Tischner McKell(b. circa 1955); Six brothers(Rick Roney; Brooke Roney; Derek Roney; Burke Roney; Kirk Roney; Park Roney; Mark Roney)

Blake M. Roney (born 19 March 1958) is the founder and former chairman of Nu Skin Enterprises. He founded the company in 1984 and is also a trustee of the Force for Good Foundation. He took leave from Nu Skin Enterprises from 2012 to 2015 to serve as a mission president for the Church of Jesus Christ of Latter-day Saints in France.
