= Charles W. Dahlquist II =

American religious leader

10th National Commissioner of the BSA
- In office 2016–2018
- Preceded by: Tico Perez
- Succeeded by: Ellie Morrison

20th LDS Young Men General President
- In office April 3, 2004 – April 4, 2009
- President: Gordon B. Hinckley
- Preceded by: F. Melvin Hammond
- Succeeded by: David L. Beck

Personal details
- Born: Charles Winston Dahlquist II; August 5, 1947 (age 79) Provo, Utah, U.S.
- Spouse: Zella Darley
- Education: Brigham Young University (B.A.); University of Utah (J.D.)

Charles Winston Dahlquist II (born August 5, 1947) is an American attorney and youth leader. He was the 20th Young Men General President of the Church of Jesus Christ of Latter-day Saints (LDS Church) from 2004 to 2009, and was the 10th National Commissioner of the Boy Scouts of America from 2016 to 2018.

== Biography ==
Born in Provo, Utah, to Charles Winston Dahlquist and Afton Ahlander, Dahlquist grew up in Boise, Idaho. He earned a bachelor's degree from Brigham Young University and a J.D. from the University of Utah. He is a member of the law firm of Kirton McConkie and was involved in medical malpractice defense and risk management law. He married Zella B. Darley in the Salt Lake Temple on June 2, 1969, and they are the parents of five daughters.

=== LDS Church service ===
He served as a missionary for the LDS Church in the Swiss Mission in the 1960s and has been a stake president and president of the Germany Hamburg Mission.

On April 3, 2004, Dahlquist was sustained as the general president of the church's Young Men organization. It was the first time since Neil D. Schaerrer was appointed to the same position in 1977 that a church general authority was not the Young Men general president. Dean R. Burgess and Michael A. Neider were called as his counselors in the Young Men general presidency. In 2009, Dahlquist was succeeded by David L. Beck.

=== Scouting ===
Dahlquist has been involved in Scouting most of his life and is a recipient of the Silver Buffalo Award, the highest honor the BSA can bestow on an adult for service to youth. In August 2009, Dahlquist was named president-elect of the BSA's Great Salt Lake Council. In May 2016, Dahlquist was named as the BSA's National Commissioner.

The Church of Jesus Christ of Latter-day Saints titles
Preceded by F. Melvin Hammond	Young Men General President; 2004–2009	Succeeded by David L. Beck
