= David L. Beck =

American religious leader

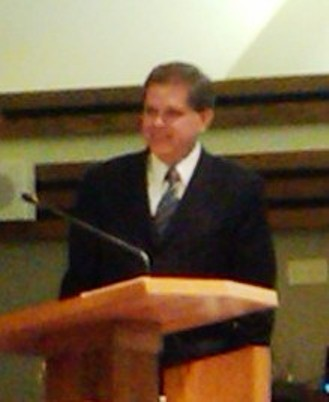
- Beck speaking to the young men in Arkansas.

21st Young Men General President
- April 4, 2009 – April 4, 2015
- Called by: Thomas S. Monson
- Predecessor: Charles W. Dahlquist
- Successor: Stephen W. Owen
- End reason: Honorably released

Personal details
- Born: David LeRoy Beck; April 12, 1953 (age 72); Salt Lake City, Utah
- Education: BSEE & MSEE
- Alma mater: University of Utah
- Spouse(s): Robyn Erickson
- Children: 4
- Parents: Wayne Beck

David LeRoy Beck (born April 12, 1953) is an American religious leader who served as the 21st Young Men General President of the Church of Jesus Christ of Latter-day Saints (LDS Church) from 2009 to 2015.

Beck was born and raised in Salt Lake City, Utah. When he was ten years old his father, Wayne Beck, was called as president of the LDS Church's Brazilian Mission and the entire family lived in Brazil for the next few years. Beck holds a bachelor's degree in electrical engineering and a master's degree in engineering administration, both from the University of Utah.

Beck has been very involved in the Boy Scouts of America and helped celebrate the 100th anniversary of the organization. He has served as a member of the National Executive Board of the Boy Scouts of America, the organization's governing body.

== LDS Church service ==
In the early 1970s, Beck served as a missionary in the Brazil North Central (later the Brazil São Paulo North) Mission. Beck has served in other positions in the LDS Church, including bishop, stake president and president of the Brazil Rio de Janeiro North Mission.

On April 4, 2009, at the LDS Church's 179th annual general conference, Beck was accepted by the membership as president of the Young Men organization. Beck succeeded Charles W. Dahlquist and selected Larry M. Gibson and Adrián Ochoa as his counselors. After Ochoa was called as a general authority and member of the Second Quorum of the Seventy in April 2013, Beck selected Randall L. Ridd as his second counselor.

In 2012, Beck spoke at a Brigham Young University commencement exercise and implored graduates, "You must never sacrifice your family for career or other outside interest. Indeed, in time and eternity you will influence nations by being family focused." While president, Beck did a tour of congregations in Africa and visited Durban, South Africa; Maputo, Mozambique; and Kinshasa, Democratic Republic of Congo. At the LDS Church's April 2015 general conference, Beck was released and succeeded by Stephen W. Owen.

== Personal life ==
Beck is married to Robyn Erickson and they are the parents of four children.

== Selected speeches ==
- "A Standard for the Nations" – Commencement address delivered at Brigham Young University on August 9, 2012

The Church of Jesus Christ of Latter-day Saints titles
Preceded by Charles W. Dahlquist II	General President of the Young Men; April 4, 2009 – April 4, 2015	Succeeded by Stephen W. Owen
