= J. Richard Clarke =

Mormon leader (1927–2022)

Emeritus General Authority
- October 4, 1997 – June 29, 2022
- Called by: Gordon B. Hinckley

Presidency of the Seventy
- October 1, 1988 – August 15, 1993
- Called by: Ezra Taft Benson
- End reason: Honorably released

First Quorum of the Seventy
- April 6, 1985 – October 4, 1997
- Called by: Spencer W. Kimball
- End reason: Granted general authority emeritus status

Second Counselor in the Presiding Bishopric
- October 1, 1976 – April 6, 1985
- Called by: Victor L. Brown
- End reason: Honorable release of Victor L. Brown and his counselors

Personal details
- Born: John Richard Clarke; April 4, 1927; Rexburg, Idaho, United States
- Died: June 29, 2022 (aged 95); Alpine, Utah, United States

John Richard Clarke (April 4, 1927 – June 29, 2022) was a general authority of the Church of Jesus Christ of Latter-day Saints (LDS Church) from 1976 until his death. He served both in the church's presiding bishopric and the Presidency of the Seventy.

Clarke was born in Rexburg, Idaho, to John R. and Nora Redford Clarke. Clarke graduated from Brigham Young University (BYU) in 1952. He worked in the insurance industry in his professional career.

== LDS Church service ==
As a young man he served as an LDS Church missionary in South Africa. Prior to his call as a general authority, he served as a bishop, stake president, and regional representative in Idaho. He also returned to South Africa as the president of the church's South Africa Cape Town Mission.

In 1976, Clarke became the second counselor to presiding bishop Victor L. Brown. He served in this capacity until Brown was released in 1985. Clarke was retained as a general authority and became a member of the First Quorum of the Seventy. He became a member of the Presidency of the Seventy in 1988. He served in that capacity until 1997 when he was released and given general authority emeritus status. In 2012, Clarke addressed the BYU student body at the weekly devotional.

From 1998 to 2001, Clarke was president of the LDS Church's Laie Hawaii Temple.

== Personal life ==
Clarke married Barbara Jean Reed and became the parents of eight children.

The Church of Jesus Christ of Latter-day Saints titles
Preceded by Vaughn J Featherstone	Second Counselor in the Presiding Bishopric; April 6, 1985 – October 3, 1992	Succeeded by Glenn L. Pace
