= Rodney C. Badger =

American Mormon leader

Rodney Carlos Badger (September 8, 1848 – April 12, 1923) was an inaugural member of the general superintendency of the Young Men's Mutual Improvement Association (YMMIA) of the Church of Jesus Christ of Latter-day Saints (LDS Church).

Badger was born in Salt Lake City a year after his Mormon pioneer parents arrived in the Salt Lake Valley. His father was Rodney Badger, who drowned when young Rodney was five years old. Upon reaching adulthood, Badger was a LDS Church missionary to California and worked as a surveyor and telegraph operator with the Utah Central Railroad.

When Junius F. Wells became the first general superintendent of the YMMIA in 1876, he chose Milton H. Hardy and Badger as his assistants. Badger acted in this capacity until 1880, when Wells was released and replaced by Wilford Woodruff.

Badger practiced plural marriage and was married to three wives.

Badger died in Salt Lake City of sepsis from a streptococcus infection.
