= Dentrix =

Dental practice management software

- Developer: Henry Schein
- Stable release: Dentrix G7.5
- Operating system: Microsoft Windows
- Type: Practice Management Software
- License: Proprietary
- Website: www.dentrix.com

Dentrix was the first dental practice management software for Microsoft Windows when it was launched in 1989 by Dentrix Dental Systems, a firm founded by Larry M. Gibson in 1985 and is based in American Fork, Utah. The Dentrix dental practice management system was designed to automate as many of the functions within the dental office as possible.

== History ==
In 1997, Henry Schein, Inc. purchased Dentrix Dental Systems, which became Henry Schein One in 2018, and has continued to develop and release new versions and products. The firm at one point provided their own digital imaging software, Dentrix Image. In 2007, the Dentrix Image product was sold to DEXIS, LLC.

In April 2014, a cloud-based product, Dentrix Ascend was released by Henry Schein, Inc. and made available to dental practices. Dentrix Ascend operates entirely online and eliminates the need for servers and manual updates.

== Product features ==
Dentrix products include practice management software for dental offices, imaging software, patient education software, computer-based training software, voice recognition software, and other products designed to enhance the dental office experience.

In 2012, the firm launched the Dentrix Developer Program (DDP), a program allowing third party vendors to access the Dentrix database through APIs. The program has steadily grown since then to include more than 250 vendors from all over the applications spectrum.

== Dentrix vulnerabilities ==
When Dentrix G5 was released to the market, the client and server was vulnerable to packet sniffing. If someone finds the password to their site, then they would know the password to all sites. This was fixed in G5 PP1 HotFix 1. Now the password is randomly generated.

Dentrix G6 uses Data Camouflage. From US-CERT.GOV, "Faircom c-treeACE provides a weak obfuscation algorithm (CWE-327) that may be unobfuscated without knowledge of a key or password. The algorithm was formerly called Faircom Standard Encryption but is now called Data Camouflage."

Dentrix G6 uses Hard Coded Credentials.

== Federal Trade Commission Fine ==
In 2016, The Federal Trade Commission reported that Henry Schein, the provider and distributor of Dentrix, will be forced to pay $250,000 to settle Federal Trade Commission charges it falsely advertised the level of encryption it provided to protect patient data in the software Dentrix G5.

== See also ==
- List of FLOSS healthcare programs
