= Jack H. Goaslind =

American religious leader

First Quorum of the Seventy
- September 30, 1978 – October 3, 1998
- Called by: Spencer W. Kimball
- End reason: Granted general authority emeritus status

Presidency of the First Quorum of the Seventy
- October 6, 1985 – August 15, 1987
- Called by: Spencer W. Kimball
- End reason: Honorably released

Presidency of the Seventy
- August 15, 1995 – August 15, 1998
- Called by: Gordon B. Hinckley
- End reason: Honorably released

Emeritus General Authority
- October 3, 1998 – April 27, 2011
- Called by: Gordon B. Hinckley

Personal details
- Born: Jack H. Goaslind Jr. April 18, 1928; Salt Lake City, Utah, United States
- Died: April 27, 2011 (aged 83); Salt Lake City, Utah, United States
- Resting place: Larkin Sunset Gardens Cemetery; 40.5564°N 111.8417°W

Jack H. Goaslind Jr. (April 18, 1928 – April 27, 2011) was a general authority of the Church of Jesus Christ of Latter-day Saints (LDS Church) from 1978 until his death. He was the seventeenth general president of the church's Young Men organization from 1990 to 1998.

Goaslind was born in Salt Lake City, Utah, to Jack, Sr. and Anita Jane Jack. As a young man, Goaslind served as a missionary for the LDS Church in the Western Canadian Mission. Goaslind had been an avid skier since childhood and by choosing to serve a mission, he passed up a chance to train for the Olympics with the United States Ski Team. After his mission, he graduated from the University of Utah and became a vice president with Affiliated Metals, Inc. Goaslind married Gwen Bradford and they had six children.

Goaslind served in the LDS Church as a bishop, stake president and a regional representative. In 1972, he was called as second counselor to Young Men general president Robert L. Backman. When the church's presiding bishopric assumed supervision of the Young Men program in 1974, Goaslind was released and served as president of the church's Arizona Tempe Mission.

In 1978, Goaslind became a general authority and member of the First Quorum of the Seventy. From 1979 to 1981, he was second counselor to Hugh W. Pinnock in the general presidency of the church's Sunday School. In 1985, he became a member of the seven-man Presidency of the Seventy, a position he held until 1987, when he became president of the church's British Isles–Africa Area. During this time, he oversaw placing Emmanuel A. Kissi in charge of the church's affairs in Ghana during "the freeze", when the government of Ghana forbade all meetings of the church. Goaslind also oversaw major humanitarian efforts of the church in São Tomé and Príncipe.

In 1990, Goaslind succeeded Vaughn J. Featherstone as general president of the Young Men. During his eight-year tenure, Goaslind had seven different men as counselors, more than any other Young Men president in history. In 1995, Goaslind was again added to the Presidency of the Seventy. He was released from the Presidency of the Seventy and from the presidency of the Young Men in 1998, when he was granted general authority emeritus status. In the leadership of the Young Men, he was succeeded by Robert K. Dellenbach, his first counselor. From 2000 to 2003, Goaslind was president of the church's Manti Utah Temple.

In 1995, Goaslind was awarded the Silver Buffalo Award by the Boy Scouts of America in recognition of his efforts to integrate Scouting into the church's Young Men program.

In 2007, he was inducted into the Order of Saint Michael of the Wing by the Royal House of Braganza, which ruled Portugal until 1910. Goaslind was selected for his humanitarian efforts in the former Portuguese colony of São Tomé and Príncipe while he was the president of the British Isles–Africa Area.

In 2011, Goaslind died in Salt Lake City at the age of 83.

The Church of Jesus Christ of Latter-day Saints titles
Preceded by Vaughn J Featherstone	General President of the Young Men; 1990–1998	Succeeded by Robert K. Dellenbach
