= Young Men (organization) =

Latter Day Saint movement men's youth organization

- Formation: 1875
- Type: Non-profit
- Purpose: religious instruction; personal standards and development; adolescent male support; Scouting
- Headquarters: Salt Lake City, Utah, U.S.
- General President: Timothy L. Farnes
- Main organ: General presidency and general board
- Parent organization: The Church of Jesus Christ of Latter-day Saints
- Affiliations: Aaronic priesthood; Young Women
- Website: churchofjesuschrist.org/youth

The Young Men (often referred to as Young Men's) is a youth organization and official program of the Church of Jesus Christ of Latter-day Saints (LDS Church). Its purpose is to assist the church's Aaronic priesthood–aged young men in their growth and development. The organization serves young men from the year they turn 12 until they are 18.

== History ==
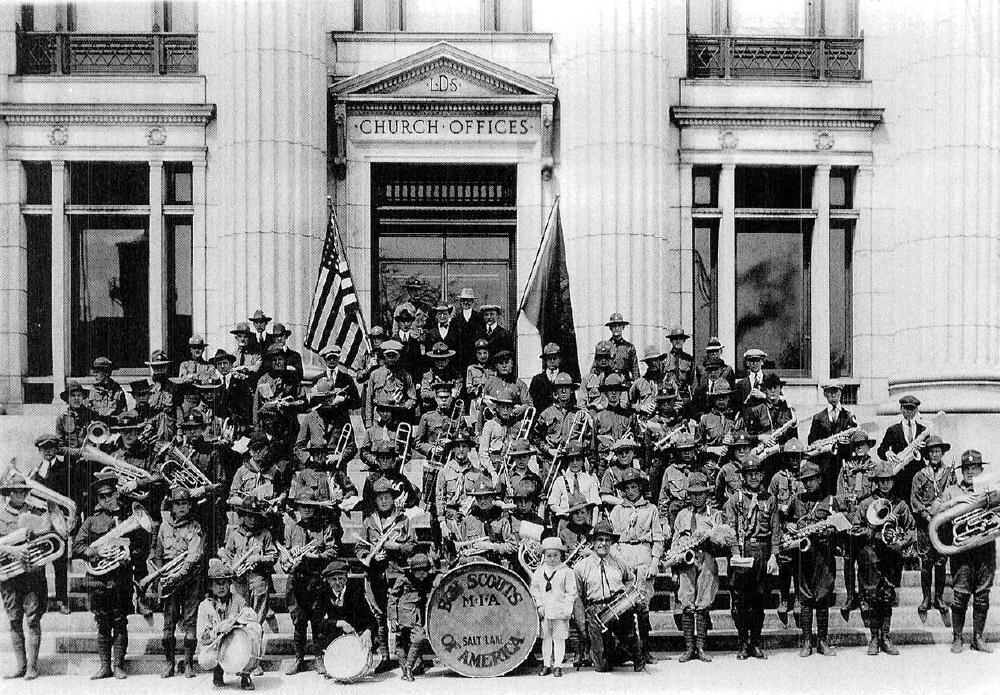
Mutual Improvement Association Scouts in front of the Church Administration Building, c. 1917

The first official youth association of the church—the Young Gentlemen's and Young Ladies’ Relief Society—was formally organized by youth in Nauvoo, Illinois, on the advice of church founder, Joseph Smith, in March 1843. The group had held several informal meetings since late January of that year under the supervision of apostle Heber C. Kimball. In 1854, apostle Lorenzo Snow organized the Polysophical Society and encouraged young Latter-day Saints to join. In 1875, LDS Church president Brigham Young organized the Young Men's Mutual Improvement Association (YMMIA) and intended that it act as a male equivalent of the Young Ladies' Cooperative Retrenchment Association, which was renamed the Young Ladies' National Mutual Improvement Association in 1877. The purpose was to "help young men develop their gifts, to stand up and speak, and to bear testimony".

A central committee of the YMMIA, led by Junius F. Wells, was formed in 1876 to oversee the organization, conduct missionary work, and issue general instructions. A YMMIA general superintendency (later renamed "general presidency") was formed by church president John Taylor in 1880.

In 1901, the YMMIA was divided into junior and senior classes. In 1911, the church followed the pattern developed by the Boy Scouts of America (BSA) and created the YMMIA Scouts. The organization was officially integrated into the BSA on May 21, 1913.

In the 1970s, the YMMIA was briefly merged with the church's Aaronic priesthood and young women's organizations and officially renamed the Aaronic Priesthood MIA Young Women. In June 1974, this consolidation was reversed: an independent Young Women organization was established and the name of the Young Men organization was changed to Aaronic Priesthood. Also in 1974, the church eliminated the YMMIA General Presidency, placing the organization under the direction of the Presiding Bishopric. The organization's name was changed to Young Men in May 1977 and a general presidency was reinstated.

Aaronic Priesthood MIA Young Women was the name of the LDS Church's official young men organization between 1972 and 1974. It was formed by consolidating the YMMIA and the YWMIA into one organization. Leadership of the auxiliary was shared between the presiding bishopric and the Young Men General Presidency. The combined organization was short-lived, and in 1974 the organization was again divided into the renamed Young Men and the Young Women. Between 1979 and 2004, the Young Men General Presidency had been composed of seventies, who were church general authorities. In the church's April 2004 general conference, Thomas S. Monson, a counselor in the First Presidency, announced that "a recent decision [has been made] that members of the Quorums of the Seventy [will] not serve in the general presidencies of the Sunday School and Young Men."

The Young Men organization was involved in Scouting from 1911 with the formation of their MIA Scouts until the end of 2019. The YMMIA Scouts merged with Boy Scouts of America (BSA) on May 21, 1913, with the church becoming the first chartering organization, with John H. Taylor as the first LDS Scout Commissioner. In 1928, the Boy Scouts was named the church's official youth program for boys ages 12 to 16. Young Men organizations in other countries were not involved in Scouting. In the United Kingdom and in other Commonwealth countries, some local groups participated in the Duke of Edinburgh's Award Scheme or its equivalent. As of January 1, 2018, the church withdrew from Varsity and Venturing scouting programs, with boys ages 8 to 13 still enrolled in the Cub Scouts and Boy Scouts. In May 2018, the church announced that they would completely withdrawal from all BSA programs at the end of 2019. In October 2019, the church announced that ward Young Men presidencies would be discontinued, and implemented the church's newly created "Children and Youth Program" at the beginning of 2020.

== Today's organization ==
In each of the church's local congregation, males turning ages 12 to 18 are assigned to the Aaronic priesthood and the Young Men organization. The Aaronic priesthood is led by a bishop or branch president and his counselors (known as the bishopric or branch presidency).

In the Aaronic priesthood, the young men are sub-divided into three aged-based priesthood offices, which also serve as classes on Sunday:

- Deacon (turning ages 12 or 13)
- Teacher (turning ages 14 or 15)
- Priest (turning ages 16 to 18)

When a young man reaches the age of 18, he is normally encouraged to begin attending the elders quorum. In certain instances, such as when a young man turns 18 but is still in secondary school, he will be encouraged to continue to attend the priests quorum.

Generally, each age group will hold a separate class for instruction during Sunday meetings. The teachers and deacons classes have a quorum president drawn from the members of the class, who in turn may choose two counselors and a secretary to assist him. The bishop or branch president is the president of the priests quorum and may choose two young men to assist him in this role, along with another young man to serve as secretary.

The Aaronic priesthood is supervised by the presiding bishopric, and the church has Young Men presidencies at the general and stake levels.

In addition to Sunday meetings, the members of the Young Men meet on a weekday for youth activities, an hour to ninety minute activity. Once per month, a combined activity is held with the members of the Young Women organization. Most congregations or stakes also organize annual or biannual youth camps, and beginning in 2020 eligible young men may attend regional For the Strength of Youth conferences every other year.

== Chronology of the general superintendencies and presidencies of the Young Men ==
No.	Dates	General President (General Superintendents in Italics) (Church general authorities in bold)	First Counselor (First Assistants in Italics) (Church general authorities in bold)	Second Counselor (Second Assistants in Italics) (Church general authorities in bold)	
Young Men's Mutual Improvement Association
1	1876–80	Junius F. Wells	Milton H. Hardy	Rodney C. Badger	
2	1880–98	**Wilford Woodruff**	**Joseph F. Smith**	**Moses Thatcher**	
3	1898–1901	**Lorenzo Snow**	**Joseph F. Smith**	**Heber J. Grant**	**Additional Assistant**
3	1898–1901	**Lorenzo Snow**	**Joseph F. Smith**	**Heber J. Grant**	**B. H. Roberts**
4	1901–18	**Joseph F. Smith**	**Heber J. Grant**	**B. H. Roberts**	
5	1918–21	**Anthony W. Ivins**	**B. H. Roberts**	**Richard R. Lyman**	
6	1921–35	**George Albert Smith**	**B. H. Roberts** (1921–22); **Richard R. Lyman** (1922–35)	**Richard R. Lyman** (1921–22); **Melvin J. Ballard** (1922–35)	
7	1935–37	Albert E. Bowen	George Q. Morris	Franklin L. West	
8	1937–48	George Q. Morris	Joseph J. Cannon (1937–45); John D. Giles (1945–48)	Burton K. Farnsworth (1937–45); Lorenzo H. Hatch (1945–48)	
9	1948–58	Elbert R. Curtis	A. Walter Stevenson	Ralph W. Hardy (1948); David S. King (1948–58)	
10	1958–62	Joseph T. Bentley	Alvin R. Dyer (1958); G. Carlos Smith (1958–61); Marvin J. Ashton (1961–62)	G. Carlos Smith (1958); Marvin J. Ashton (1958–61); Verl F. Scott (1961); Carl W. Buehner (1961–62)	
11	1962–69	G. Carlos Smith	Marvin J. Ashton	Carl W. Buehner (1962–67); George R. Hill III (1967–69)	
12	1969–72	W. Jay Eldredge	George R. Hill III (1969–71); George I. Cannon (1972)	George I. Cannon (1969–72); Robert L. Backman (1972)	
Aaronic Priesthood MIA Young Women
13	1972–74	Robert L. Backman	LeGrand R. Curtis	Jack H. Goaslind	
	1974–77	**None** (Under jurisdiction of Presiding Bishopric)			
	1974–77	**Victor L. Brown** (Presiding Bishop)	**H. Burke Peterson** (First Councilor)	**J. Richard Clarke** (Second Councilor)	
Young Men
14	1977–79	Neil D. Schaerrer	Graham W. Doxey	Quinn G. McKay	
15	1979–85	**Robert L. Backman**	**Vaughn J Featherstone**	**Rex D. Pinegar**	
16	1985–90	**Vaughn J Featherstone**	**Rex D. Pinegar** (1985–89); **Jeffrey R. Holland** (1989–90)	**Robert L. Simpson** (1985–86); **Hartman Rector Jr.** (1986–88); **Robert B. Harbertson** (1988–89); **Monte J. Brough** (1989–90)	
17	1990–98	**Jack H. Goaslind**	**LeGrand R. Curtis** (1990–91); **Robert K. Dellenbach** (1991–92); **Stephen D. Nadauld** (1992–96); **Vaughn J Featherstone** (1996–97); **F. David Stanley** (1997); **Robert K. Dellenbach** (1997–98)	**Robert K. Dellenbach** (1990–91); **Stephen D. Nadauld** (1991–92); **L. Lionel Kendrick** (1992–93); **Vaughn J Featherstone** (1993–96); **F. David Stanley** (1996–97); **Robert K. Dellenbach** (1997); **F. Melvin Hammond** (1997–98)	
18	1998–2001	**Robert K. Dellenbach**	**F. Melvin Hammond**	**John M. Madsen**	
19	2001–04	**F. Melvin Hammond**	**Glenn L. Pace** (2001–03); **Lynn G. Robbins** (2003–04)	**Spencer J. Condie** (2001–03); **Donald L. Hallstrom** (2003–04)	
20	2004–09	Charles W. Dahlquist II	Dean R. Burgess	Michael A. Neider	
21	2009–15	David L. Beck	Larry M. Gibson	Adrián Ochoa (2009–13); Randall L. Ridd (2013–15)	
22	2015–2020	Stephen W. Owen	Douglas D. Holmes	M. Joseph Brough	
23	2020–2025	Steven J. Lund	Ahmad S. Corbitt (2020–2023); Bradley R. Wilcox (2023–2025)	Bradley R. Wilcox (2020–2023); Michael T. Nelson (2023–2025)	
24	2025-	Timothy L. Farnes	David J. Wunderli	Sean R. Dixon	

== See also ==
- Anticipatory socialization
- The Contributor (LDS magazine)
- Improvement Era
- New Era (magazine)
- Worship services of The Church of Jesus Christ of Latter-day Saints
