= Gary J. Coleman =

American Mormon leader (born 1941)

Second Quorum of the Seventy
- June 6, 1992 – April 5, 1997
- Called by: Ezra Taft Benson
- End reason: Transferred to First Quorum of the Seventy

First Quorum of the Seventy
- April 5, 1997 – October 1, 2011
- Called by: Gordon B. Hinckley
- End reason: Granted general authority emeritus status

Emeritus General Authority
- October 1, 2011
- Called by: Thomas S. Monson

Personal details
- Born: Gary Jerome Coleman; September 18, 1941 (age 84); Wenatchee, Washington, United States

Gary Jerome Coleman (born September 18, 1941) has been a general authority of the Church of Jesus Christ of Latter-day Saints (LDS Church) since 1992.

Coleman was born in Wenatchee, Washington. He was raised a Roman Catholic in the Diocese of Spokane. As a student at Washington State University (WSU), Coleman was introduced to the LDS Church by John M. Madsen and Judith Renee England. At age 21, Coleman was baptized into the LDS Church by Madsen, and then married England.

After graduating from WSU, Coleman went on the receive master's and doctorate degrees from Brigham Young University (BYU).

== LDS Church service ==
Prior to his call as a general authority, Coleman was an instructor in the Church Educational System. At the time of his call as a general authority he was the assistant director of the Institute of Religion in Ogden, Utah, adjacent to Weber State University. Coleman has served in the church as a bishop and as a counselor to both stake and mission presidents. He also served as president of the California Arcadia Mission.

Coleman was called as a general authority and member of the Second Quorum of the Seventy in 1992. He was transferred to the First Quorum of the Seventy in 1997. On October 1, 2011, Coleman was released from the First Quorum of the Seventy and designated as an emeritus general authority at the church's general conference.

In 2012, Coleman was the keynote speaker at Brigham Young University's 41st Annual Sidney B. Sperry Symposium on the Scriptures.

== Bibliography ==
- The Journey of Conversion: A Renewed Invitation to Come Unto Christ Gary J. Coleman (Deseret Book Co, September 1, 2003, ISBN 978-1590381618)
- Yes, Mormons Are Christians Gary J. Coleman (Legends Library, 2017, ISBN 978-1944200343)

== See also ==
- List of general authorities of The Church of Jesus Christ of Latter-day Saints
- 2008 Deseret Morning News Church Almanac (Salt Lake City, Utah: Deseret Morning News, 2007) p. 43
