= Junius F. Wells =

LDS Church administrator and author (1854–1930)

Junius Free Wells (June 1, 1854 – April 15, 1930) was the first head of the Young Men's Mutual Improvement Association, an organization that today is the Young Men organization of the Church of Jesus Christ of Latter-day Saints (LDS Church). He also was a magazine founder, an author, and the chief organizer of the LDS Church's efforts to build several historical monuments in the early 1900s.

== Early life and education ==
Born in Salt Lake City, Utah Territory, Wells was the son of LDS Church leader Daniel H. Wells and his fourth wife, Hannah Corrilla Free. He studied at the University of Deseret.

On 17 June 1879 Wells married Helena Middleton Fobes.

== Young Men's Mutual Improvement Association leadership ==
In 1875, church president Brigham Young organized the Young Men's Mutual Improvement Association. The first implementation of the organization was in the Salt Lake 13th Ward, with Junius F. Wells as president. Among his counselors was Heber J. Grant.

In 1876, Young selected Wells to lead the organization throughout the church. In 1880, John Taylor released Wells from his duties and revised the leadership of the YMMIA, appointing Wilford Woodruff as the general superintendent. After Wells's release, the church's organization for young men would be led by general authorities of the church until 1935.

== The Contributor and other works ==
Wells was also the founding editor and publisher of The Contributor, an independent publication that sought to represent the YMMIA and the church's equivalent organization for young women. Wells continued in these roles until 1892, when the magazine was purchased by the Cannon family and Abraham H. Cannon became the editor and publisher. The Contributor ceased publication in 1896.

Wells was also the author of eleven biographies, including those of John C. Frémont, Thomas L. Kane, Charles C. Rich, James A. Garfield, and Orson Pratt. He also authored numerous articles and short stories, the majority of which appeared in The Contributor.

== Mormon historical monuments ==
In 1884, Wells visited the birthplace of church founder Joseph Smith in Sharon, Vermont, and conceived a plan to build a monument to the Mormon prophet. Under the direction of Joseph F. Smith, Wells oversaw the construction of the Joseph Smith Birthplace Memorial in 1905. The monument was dedicated by Smith on December 23, 1905, the 100th anniversary of Joseph Smith's birth. Wells also was the chief organizer in having a monument erected by the church to the Three Witnesses in Richmond, Missouri, in 1911.

Other works created by Wells included the Hyrum Smith monument created in Salt Lake City in 1918.

From 1921 to 1930 Wells was an Assistant Church historian. Among other works in this position, he arranged for the purchase of the glass plate negatives of George Edward Anderson's work.

=== Junius F. Wells Award ===
In 2005, the Mormon Historic Sites Foundation created the Junius F. Wells Award, to be awarded to individuals who promote the purposes of the Foundation.

==== Award recipients ====
- 2005: Gordon B. Hinckley
- 2006: Karl Ricks Anderson and Richard Lloyd Anderson
- 2007: M. Russell Ballard
- 2010: Florence S. Jacobsen

== Missionary service ==
As of 1919 Wells was serving as the chief assistant to George Albert Smith in running the British and European missions. He also served another mission to Britain.

== Death ==
Wells died in the Hotel Utah in Salt Lake City, Utah, at age 75.

== See also ==
- Milton H. Hardy
- Rodney C. Badger

== Notes ==
The Church of Jesus Christ of Latter-day Saints titles
First	Superintendent of the Young Men’s Mutual Improvement Association; 1876–1880	Succeeded by Wilford Woodruff
