= Dental Depot =

- Industry: Dentistry
- Founded: 1978; 48 years ago in Oklahoma, South Central United States
- Founder: Dr. Glenn Ashmore
- Headquarters: Oklahoma City, United States
- Number of locations: 20 (2018)
- Area served: Oklahoma, Texas, and Arizona in United States
- Revenue: ▲$60 Million (2017)
- Website: dentaldepot.net

Dental Depot is an American dental practice based in Oklahoma City, United States.

The company has offices in Moore, Edmond, Yukon, Norman, Oklahoma City, and Midwest City as well as the Tulsa area.

== History ==
Dental Depot was founded by Dr. Glenn Ashmore in 1978, and is still a family-owned and operated dental practice.

In March 2017, the company expanded its offering by starting dental implant services and general dentistry services under the same roof, reportedly by The Oklahoman.

The company hit $60 Million annual revenue in 2017.

== See also ==
- American Dental Association
