= Richard Lloyd Anderson =

American lawyer and theologist (1926–2018)

Richard Lloyd Anderson (9 May 1926 – 12 August 2018) was an American lawyer and theologist of the Church of Jesus Christ of Latter-day Saints (LDS Church) who was a professor of church history and doctrine at Brigham Young University (BYU). His book Investigating the Book of Mormon Witnesses is widely considered the definitive work on this subject. Anderson was the brother of Karl Ricks Anderson.

== Biography ==
Anderson was born in Salt Lake City to Lloyd Anderson and his wife, Agnes Ricks. His father was an advertising executive with local newspapers. His family moved in later years so he attended high school in Provo, Ogden and Pocatello.

Anderson served in the United States Naval Air Corps during World War II. He was a radio-man because of an overbite that disqualified him from being a pilot. He took a correspondence course from BYU on the New Testament while in the Navy. He also asked LDS Church missionaries about their teaching methods and went to teaching appointments with them, which was the beginnings of his later standardized gospel-teaching plan.

Anderson became known in when he created the "Anderson Plan," one of the earliest organized systems for the church's missionaries to teach lessons to non-members. This was developed with the encouragement of his mission president, Joel Richards (brother of LeGrand Richards). Anderson developed this plan while serving as a missionary in the church's Northwestern States Mission, from 1946 to 1949. This plan helped his mission be the first to baptize 1,000 converts in a year. By 1951, 11,000 copies of the plan were published and circulated to missions throughout the world, and helped to increase the overall number of converts per missionary. This contributed to the church publishing its own plan in 1952, "A Systematic Program for Teaching the Gospel." After his mission, Anderson was consulted by Gordon B. Hinckley as he was developing a standardized missionary teaching plan for the use of all missionaries.

In 1949, Anderson began his college studies at Weber College (now Weber State University). Hugh Nibley and Sidney B. Sperry both wrote to Anderson to urge him to come to BYU. He did so, where he studied Early Christian history and Greek under Nibley and Latin under J. Reuben Clark III and M. Carl Gibson.

While studying at BYU, Anderson married Carma Rose de Jong (born 1930), daughter of Gerrit de Jong Jr., the founding dean of BYU's College of Fine Arts. Carma's own historical interests led to a Ph.D. in historic clothing, and work for the church's Historical Department and Museum of Church History and Art. For nine years Carma taught an early Mormon clothing class at BYU. She also wrote a book The Cultural Arts of Nauvoo.

In 1951, not long after his marriage to Carma, Anderson set out to Harvard where he earned a J.D. from Harvard Law School. He also did studies in Greek while at Harvard and was admitted into their program of Ancient History. However his financial situation was looking down so he took the opportunity to go to Cedar City, Utah and teach for the Church Educational System there. After this Anderson earned an M.A. in Greek from BYU while working full-time as a religion instructor there starting in 1955. Anderson left BYU in 1957 to study for his Ph.D. He received a Ph.D. from the University of California, Berkeley. He returned to Utah and became a professor at BYU in 1964, teaching church history and doctrine, ancient scripture, and some courses in Greek.

One of the books Anderson wrote was Joseph Smith's New England Heritage. Anderson has also written many articles on issues relating to early Latter-day Saint history. He was a contributor to both the Encyclopedia of Mormonism and the Encyclopedia of Latter-day Saint History.

Anderson not only studied the early history of the LDS Church, he also studied the New Testament and the early history of the Christian Church. Anderson has also written about early Christianity. Among his works on this subject is Understanding Paul (Salt Lake City: Deseret Book, 1983). He also wrote an article on crucifixion.

He also wrote studies on various spurious accounts of the life of Christ, including an essay that demonstrated how 3 Nephi in the Book of Mormon did not fit the general pattern common to such modern forgeries, lending support to it as an authentic historical record.

In 2006, Anderson was given the Junius F. Wells Award by the Mormon Historic Sites Foundation.

He died on 12 August 2018.
