= Steven J. Lund =

American businessman and religious leader (born 1953)

23rd Young Men General President
- April 4, 2020 – August 1, 2025
- Called by: Russell M. Nelson
- Predecessor: Stephen W. Owen
- Successor: Timothy L. Farnes

Personal details
- Born: October 30, 1953 (age 72); Mesa, Arizona, United States
- Education: Brigham Young University (BA, JD)
- Spouse(s): Kalleen Kirk (m. 1980)
- Children: 4

Steven J. Lund (born October 30, 1953) is an American businessman, lawyer, and religious leader who served as the 23rd Young Men (YM) General President of the Church of Jesus Christ of Latter-day Saints (LDS Church) from April 2020 to August 2025.

Lund worked as an attorney before co-founding and later becoming CEO of Utah-based Nu Skin Enterprises, a multilevel marketing company that develops and sells personal care products and dietary supplements.

Lund served as a full-time LDS Church missionary in the Netherlands Amsterdam Mission. He attended Brigham Young University, where he obtained both a degree in communications and a juris doctor degree from the J. Reuben Clark Law School. He served in the U.S. Army and was assigned to Frankfurt, Germany where he met his future wife.

== LDS Church service ==
Lund has served in the LDS Church as president of the Georgia Atlanta Mission from 2003 to 2006, area seventy, and member of the YM general board.

Lund was called as YM general president in April 2020. As president, he spoke in the church's General Conference three times.

In the October 2020 general conference, Lund gave an address centered on the faith of his 12-year-old son dying of cancer.

Lund's other general conference talks were in October 2022 and April 2025.

In December 2020, Lund helped announce the creation of the new youth-based magazine, For the Strength of Youth and remarked, "We really need to place virtuous things front and center in our lives".

Lund's release as YM general president was announced in the church's April 2025 general conference, and became effective August 2025.

== Personal life ==
Lund married Kalleen Kirk in 1980 and they have four children. He is a former regent of the Utah System of Higher Education.

In 2012, Lund was a major donor to presidential candidate Mitt Romney and was connected to Eli Publishing Inc., a political action committee.

The Church of Jesus Christ of Latter-day Saints titles
Preceded by Stephen W. Owen	General President of the Young Men; April 4, 2020 - August 1, 2025	Succeeded by Timothy L. Farnes
