= Patterson Companies =

Medical multinational company

Patterson Companies, Inc.
- Formerly: Patterson Dental Company
- Type: Public
- Traded as: Nasdaq: PDCO; S&P 600 component
- Industry: Dental equipment Veterinary pharmaceuticals
- Founded: 1877; 149 years ago (Patterson Dental) in Milwaukee, Wisconsin
- Founders: John G. Patterson; M.F. Patterson
- Headquarters: Mendota Heights, Minnesota, U.S.
- Key people: John D. Buck (chairman); Don Zurbay (president & CEO)
- Revenue: $3.237 bil FY'10▲4.6%
- Net income: $212.254 mil FY'10▲6.3%
- Total assets: $2,447.952 mil July'10▲1%
- Total equity: $1,485.881 mil July'10 ▲1%
- Number of employees: c. 7,600 (April 28, 2023)
- Divisions: 18 sub, 3 div Patterson Dental Supply, Inc. Patterson Veterinary Supply, Inc. Animal Health International
- Website: pattersoncompanies.com

Patterson Companies, Inc., commonly known as Patterson Cos. Is an American company based in Mendota Heights, Minnesota. It was established in 1877 as a dental company and entered the animal health industry in 2001 with its acquisition of Webster Veterinary (now Patterson Veterinary) and expanded with its 2015 acquisition of Animal Health International, Inc.

== History ==
The company traces its roots through division Patterson Dental Supply back to one established in 1878 named Patterson Dental Company. It remained focused solely on the dental products market until the 21st century when it branched out into the veterinary supplies market through 2 large acquisitions, JA Webster in 2001 (92.5 million dollars) and ProVet in 2004. For about 130 years it dealt only in dental supplies. It began selling rehabilitation supplies in 2004 after acquiring Ability One Products Corporation followed by Medco the same year.

In 1987, it acquired D.L. Saslow Co another major distributor. It went public on the Nasdaq in 1992 with an IPO of around 480 million dollars. In 1993, it started doing business outside of the US by purchasing Healthco Canada.

In 1997, it purchased software developer Eaglesoft Inc a company founded by Scott R. Kabbes who 6 years later was made president of Patterson Dental Company. It later became Patterson Technology Center

In 2004, CAESY Patient Education Systems was acquired. In July 2004, it was renamed as Patterson Companies Inc.

In December 2008, Patterson acquires Dolphin Imaging and Management Solutions. In 2008, it was noted as having one of the lowest debt ratios among companies in the health care sector. Patterson was also a member of the Nasdaq-100 until December 10, 2010 when it and six other companies were replaced.

On June 17, 2010, Patterson Medical purchased the rehabilitation part of Ireland-based DCC Healthcare (Days Healthcare, Physiomed and Ausmedic). The new companies were added to its Homecraft Rolyan unit in the UK.

On 26 April 2021, Patterson Veterinary Supply, Inc., has agreed to a deal to buy Miller Vet Holdings, LLC's assets.

In December 2024, Patient Square agreed to acquire the company for $4.1 billion.

== Criticism and controversy ==
=== FTP server data breach ===
In 2016, a security researcher named Justin Shafer found 22,000 patients data on an FTP Server owned by Patterson Dental. He was reportedly raided by the FBI.

=== Animal welfare issues ===
In 2017, photographs captured by a former employee of a Texas blood bank that Patterson Veterinary distributed products from showed greyhounds under duress. PETA revealed pictures and video taken at The Pet Blood Bank showing kenneled dogs with open wounds, rotting teeth and severely overgrown toenails. According to The Washington Post, "Pet Blood Bank owner Shane Altizer did not deny that the images were taken there, but said they predated his 2015 purchase of the company or were “moment snapshots” unrepresentative of overall conditions now." A veterinarian who visited the facility earlier in the year said she found the dogs to be in satisfactory condition but after seeing the pictures, believed that “(T)he facility was ‘cleaned up’ before our touring...This certainly suggests that regional, state and/or federal regulation is warranted.”

On its website, Patterson said it had "ceased doing business" with the blood bank, which subsequently closed.

=== FTC antitrust ===
In 2019, the FTC ruled that Patterson Dental, Henry Schein, Inc., and Benco Dental violated antitrust law by refusing to compete for the business of buying groups by colluding with each other.

On November 8, 2019 the FTC's website states: "Judge Chappell held that Benco Dental Supply Company and Patterson Companies, Inc. conspired to refuse to provide discounts to, or otherwise serve, buying groups representing dental practitioners. The judge dismissed the charges against the third respondent, Henry Schein, Inc. "
