= Lynn G. Robbins =

American Mormon leader

Second Quorum of the Seventy
- April 5, 1997 – April 1, 2000
- Called by: Gordon B. Hinckley
- End reason: Transferred to First Quorum of the Seventy

First Quorum of the Seventy
- April 1, 2000 – October 1, 2022
- Called by: Gordon B. Hinckley

Presidency of the Seventy
- April 5, 2014 – August 1, 2018
- Called by: Thomas S. Monson

Personal details
- Born: Lynn Grant Robbins; October 27, 1952 (age 72); Payson, Utah, United States

Lynn Grant Robbins (born October 27, 1952) is a co-founder of Franklin Quest Company and has been a general authority of the Church of Jesus Christ of Latter-day Saints (LDS Church) since 1997. As part of his general authority responsibilities, Robbins served as a member of the church's Presidency of the Seventy from 2014 to 2018.

Robbins was born in Payson, Utah, and was raised in Springville, Utah. He is a great-great-grandson of George Reynolds. From 1971 to 1973, Robbins served as an LDS Church missionary in the Argentina North Mission. After his mission he married Jan Nielson and they are the parents of seven children.

Robbins received a bachelor's degree in Spanish from Utah State University and a master's degree in international management from the American Graduate School of International Management in Glendale, Arizona.

In 1983, Robbins was one of the founders of the Franklin Institute, which later became Franklin Quest and eventually Franklin Covey.

Among other positions in the LDS Church, Robbins has served as an early-morning seminary teacher and as a bishop. From 1994 to 1997, Robbins was president of the Uruguay Montevideo Mission. In this position, Robbins started a program to involve the youth of the church in directly working with the missionaries that led to several baptisms.

Robbins was called as a member of the Second Quorum of the Seventy in 1997. In 2000, he became a member of the First Quorum of the Seventy. In 2003 and 2004, he was a member of the general presidency of the church's Young Men organization. As a general authority, Robbins also served in several area presidencies and in 2011 was appointed Executive Director of the Media Services Department.

At the church's April 2014 general conference, Robbins was accepted by the membership as a member of the Presidency of the Seventy, succeeding Tad R. Callister, who was appointed as general president of the church's Sunday School. As a member of the Presidency of the Seventy, Robbins had responsibility for the North America Southwest and North America Southeast areas and participated in the dedication of the Provo City Center Temple. In October 2022, Robbins was designated as an emeritus general authority.

== Additional sources ==
- 2007 Deseret Morning News Church Almanac (Salt Lake City, Utah: Deseret Morning News, 2006) p. 38
- R. Scott Lloyd, "His testimony grew line upon line as he exercised faith," Church News, June 28, 1997
- "Elder Lynn G. Robbins Of the Seventy," Ensign, May 1997, p. 106
