= Regional representative of the Twelve =

Administrative position in LDS church

Regional representative of the Twelve, commonly shorted to regional representative or regional rep, was a priesthood calling in the Church of Jesus Christ of Latter-day Saints (LDS Church) between 1968 and 1995. As the title suggests, the responsibility of regional representatives was to represent the Quorum of the Twelve Apostles in the various regions or areas of the church. Regional representatives were not general authorities or general officers of the church, but were lay ministers who donated their time to church service.

== Creation ==
In 1965 the Priesthood Correlation Committee sent representatives to local church units to implement the correlation program and consolidate church programs. However, resistance at the local level to correlation was slowing down the implementation. Harold B. Lee, as the leader of the correlation committee, proposed that the local correlation representatives instead be regional representatives of the Quorum of the Twelve, thus giving them more authority and a better chance of overcoming local resistance to correlation.

At the church's October 1967 general conference, the First Presidency announced the creation of a new position called the regional representative of the Twelve:

As many of you will remember, in 1941, it became necessary for the First Presidency and the Twelve to provide for additional brethren to help with the work of overseeing and setting in order an ever-growing, world-wide Church. Thus in the General Conference of April 1941, Assistants to the Twelve were named and sustained, "to be increased or otherwise from time to time as the necessity of carrying on the Lord's work seems to dictate.

Since then the world-wide demands of the Church have increased in ever greater degree and it is felt by the First Presidency and the Twelve that a further provision for guidance and direction is now needed.

What, therefore, is now proposed is the calling of as many brethren as may be necessary, to be known as Regional Representatives of the Twelve, each, as assigned, to be responsible in some aspects of the work to carry counsel to and to conduct instructional meetings in groups of stakes or regions as may be designated from time to time.

These Regional Representatives of the Twelve will not be "General" Authorities, as such, but will serve somewhat as do stake presidents, giving full Church service time for greater or lesser periods of service as circumstances may suggest.

At the same conference, the First Presidency announced the name of 69 men who would commence work as regional representatives on January 1, 1968. Most of the individuals called as regional representatives had previously served in stake presidencies or as mission presidents. Their names were:

- Arthur S. Anderson
- Howard B. Anderson
- Wendell J. Ashton
- William Grant Bangerter
- Robert W. Barker
- R. Raymond Barnes
- William H. Bennett
- Clifton D. Boyack
- Harold R. Boyer
- Daken K. Broadhead
- Carl W. Buehner
- Berkeley L. Bunker
- Wilford M. Burton
- J. Elliot Cameron
- Alvin C. Chace
- Alten Christensen
- A. Ray Curtis
- John C. Dalton
- Junius E. Driggs
- Edward E. Drury, Jr.
- J. Howard Dunn
- John K. Edmunds
- A. Lewis Elggren
- Donald Ellsworth
- Percy K. Fetzer
- G. Roy Fugal
- J. Thomas Fyans
- L. Brent Goates
- David B. Haight
- Cecil E. Hart
- Heber J. Heiner, Jr.
- David E. Heywood
- Ralph J. Hill
- Phil D. Jensen
- Edwin B. Jones
- J. Talmage Jones
- Wilford W. Kirton, Jr.
- E. Coleman Madsen
- Howard J. Marsh
- Henry A. Matis
- Neal A. Maxwell
- Z. Reed Millar
- Max C. Mortensen
- George H. Mortimer
- Leslie T. Norton
- Raymond J. Pace
- Finn B. Paulsen
- Wilford H. Payne
- Vern R. Peel
- Henry E. Peterson
- George W. Poulsen, Jr.
- Rex C. Reeve
- G. Lamont Richards
- Stephen C. Richards
- Clarence F. Robison
- Myles W. Romney
- John M. Russon
- Robert N. Sears
- Stanford G. Smith
- C. Laird Snelgrove
- O. Leslie Stone
- Richard S. Summerhays
- Allen M. Swan
- Grant S. Thorn
- J. Clifford Wallace
- Wilburn C. West
- C. Bryant Whiting
- Harold M. Wright.

These were the original appointees but additional men continued to be appointed to serve as Regional Representatives as late as David A. Bednar in 1994.

== Duties and authority ==
The primary duty of the regional representatives was to "assist the members of the Council of the Twelve in training and encouraging stake leaders in their various duties, and for this purpose they began to visit the stakes frequently".

Regional representatives were given the honorific title "Elder" and were considered to be layer of authority spanning the bridge between general authorities and the stake, ward, and mission church leaders.

== Abolishment and replacement ==
At the April 1995 general conference, in one of his first major administrative acts as church president, Gordon B. Hinckley announced the discontinuance of the position of regional representative and creation of the new position of area authority.

In April 1997, the church ordained all area authorities to the priesthood office of seventy and renamed the position "Area Authority Seventy". Later, the title "Area Authority Seventy" was shortened to "Area Seventy".

In the LDS Church today, the duties that were formerly carried out by regional representatives are now largely carried out by these area seventies.

== See also ==
- Assistant to the Quorum of the Twelve Apostles
