= List of recipients of the Silver Antelope Award =

The Silver Antelope Award is used to recognize registered adult Scouters of exceptional character who have provided distinguished service within one of the geographical regions of Scouting America.

The recognition was presented by the National Court of Honor on behalf of the regions of Scouting America until 2021. Beginning in 2022, as a result of the reorganization of the National Council, they are presented on behalf of Scouting America's Council Service Territories.

Completed nomination forms are submitted to local councils for Scout executive approval, then submitted electronically to the National Court of Honor. Awards are presented each year as part of Scouting America's National Council Annual Meeting or at another appropriate occasion.

Recipients receive a certificate, a embroidered square knot emblem for the field uniform, and the Silver Antelope medal. The medal is a silver antelope suspended from an orange and white ribbon for formal occasions and civilian wear. Recipients also receive a lapel pin for non-uniform wear.

Unlike the Silver Buffalo Award, recipients must be registered as adult members of Scouting America.

== List of Recipients ==
Region/Territory	Name	Year
Service Territory 1	Anderson, Bruce	2026
Service Territory 1	Deatherage, Kaleen	2023
Service Territory 1	Griffin, William Mark	2024
Service Territory 1	Hunker, Dan	2022
Service Territory 1	Johnson, Michael	2022
Service Territory 1	Larson, William C.	2026
Service Territory 1	Miller, Terrel W.	2025
Service Territory 1	Murphy, David H.	2024
Service Territory 1	Olson, Marlys M. “Dolly”	2025
Service Territory 1	Patten, Matthew C.	2025
Service Territory 2	Bouley, Joseph R.	2024
Service Territory 2	Brown, Terrance J.	2023
Service Territory 2	Hunter, Michael S.	2023
Service Territory 2	Lieber, Rich	2022
Service Territory 2	Tarleton, James	2022
Service Territory 2	Topkis, William	2022
Service Territory 2	Williams, Mark	2024
Service Territory 3	Atherton, Tracy	2024
Service Territory 3	Boothe, Paula	2026
Service Territory 3	Clark, Rick	2023
Service Territory 3	Dodson, Stephen E.	2023
Service Territory 3	Giugni, Thomas	2022
Service Territory 3	James, Robert A.	2026
Service Territory 3	Lamarche, Anne-Marie	2022
Service Territory 3	Lee, Sang	2024
Service Territory 3	Mayfield, Bruce	2026
Service Territory 3	Mo, Jo Ann Jung	2025
Service Territory 3	Takeshita, Clint E.	2025
Service Territory 4	Gitzen, Charles	2022
Service Territory 4	Hamous, Bruce A.	2026
Service Territory 4	Jensen, Phil	2026
Service Territory 4	Lenker, William S.	2023
Service Territory 4	Lewis, Michael C.	2025
Service Territory 4	Meinke, Loren B.	2025
Service Territory 4	Miller, Steven E.	2024
Service Territory 4	Serrot, Steven	2022
Service Territory 4	Wilson, Marvin J.	2023
Service Territory 5	Balbes, Dr. Lisa	2024
Service Territory 5	Black, Joseph	2025
Service Territory 5	Boswell Sr, Scott Senn	2022
Service Territory 5	Boyer, Kirk R.	2024
Service Territory 5	Burleski, Joseph	2022
Service Territory 5	Coletti, Dr. Ronald F.	2025
Service Territory 5	Elkins, Marc E.	2026
Service Territory 5	Erikson, Scott A.	2023
Service Territory 5	Hay, Glenn T.	2023
Service Territory 5	Levitt, Bruce A.	2026
Service Territory 5	Pluff, Mark A.	2025
Service Territory 5	Werts, Dale A.	2023
Service Territory 6	Arnold, Jeremiah J.	2025
Service Territory 6	Davies, Richard	2026
Service Territory 6	Dozier, John	2024
Service Territory 6	Harris, Donald P.	2025
Service Territory 6	Long, Dr. Spencer A.	2024
Service Territory 6	Peterson, Ronald R.	2023
Service Territory 6	Simmons, Susan	2022
Service Territory 6	Tangen, Michael	2022
Service Territory 6	Tuohy, Anna Helene	2023
Service Territory 6	Warren, Raymond J.	2026
Service Territory 7	Bjerkaas, Forrest	2022
Service Territory 7	Chassells, Gary Brian	2025
Service Territory 7	Cook, Thomas W.	2023
Service Territory 7	Dockendorf, Dr. Brian	2025
Service Territory 7	Files, Michael	2025
Service Territory 7	Hirsch, Lance	2026
Service Territory 7	Jeffery, Jim	2026
Service Territory 7	Maxwell, William F.	2024
Service Territory 7	Richert, MD, Harvey M.	2024
Service Territory 7	Taylor, J. Steve	2023
Service Territory 7	Turner Jr., Ben	2022
Service Territory 8	Ballantine, Danielle	2026
Service Territory 8	Bush, David	2026
Service Territory 8	Carrier, Max	2022
Service Territory 8	Curzon, Tom	2026
Service Territory 8	Dillon, Ray C.	2024
Service Territory 8	Gordon, Kenneth	2023
Service Territory 8	Hamilton, David M.	2025
Service Territory 8	Moore, Paul R.	2025
Service Territory 8	Sitz, Anthony	2024
Service Territory 8	Spinks, Robert	2022
Service Territory 8	Stewart, Jr., Gene	2023
Service Territory 9	Arehart, Mary Catherine	2025
Service Territory 9	Berger, David	2024
Service Territory 9	Brumbaugh, Sherri Garner	2025
Service Territory 9	Champion, Laurie	2022
Service Territory 9	Everhart, Connie	2022
Service Territory 9	Fleck, Mark	2024
Service Territory 9	Gargas, Jr., Richard J.	2023
Service Territory 9	Hemmerly, Robert E.	2023
Service Territory 9	Taylor, Robert C.	2026
Service Territory 10	Arico, John	2025
Service Territory 10	Bacalles, George J.	2025
Service Territory 10	Davis, Maj. (Ret.) Felton L.	2024
Service Territory 10	DeFrank, Randy	2022
Service Territory 10	Griffin, James	2022
Service Territory 10	Holtzman, Mark R.	2024
Service Territory 10	McAllister, David E.	2026
Service Territory 10	Thornley, Frederick W.	2023
Service Territory 10	VanAuken, Alan B.	2023
Service Territory 10	Wardle, George S.	2026
Service Territory 10	Willemain, John	2026
Service Territory 11	Andres, John	2023
Service Territory 11	Bass, Terry	2024
Service Territory 11	Harris, Charles	2024
Service Territory 11	Izyk, Cheryl	2022
Service Territory 11	Smith, Rochell	2022
Service Territory 11	Steiner, R. James	2023
Service Territory 12	Avey, Robert A.	2026
Service Territory 12	Carlson, David A.	2024
Service Territory 12	Castillo, Chris	2025
Service Territory 12	Dougan, Dr. Arden D.	2025
Service Territory 12	Huneke, Michael	2022
Service Territory 12	Kirby, Dr. Joshua A.	2025
Service Territory 12	Leary, Gordon	2022
Service Territory 12	Morrison, Alan J.	2024
Service Territory 12	Rose, Ann C.	2023
Service Territory 12	Tedeschi, Brian	2023
Service Territory 13	Barnard, Mark	2022
Service Territory 13	Berger, Marshall K.	2026
Service Territory 13	Bolger, Charles	2024
Service Territory 13	Gross, Wayne E.	2025
Service Territory 13	Grossman, Alan H.	2026
Service Territory 13	Jones, Archer	2023
Service Territory 13	Kraeutler, Thomas	2022
Service Territory 13	Kropa, William J.	2023
Service Territory 13	Strigle, Joseph P.	2024
Service Territory 13	Valentino, Brian J.	2026
Service Territory 14	Bengston, Karen	2025
Service Territory 14	Bloodworth, Robert H.	2024
Service Territory 14	Brown, Timothy	2022
Service Territory 14	Burge, David J.	2026
Service Territory 14	Chapin, Jennifer H.	2025
Service Territory 14	Fickling, III, William A.	2023
Service Territory 14	Hinckley, Randall J.	2024
Service Territory 14	Huff, Deborah G.	2023
Service Territory 14	Manning, Christopher J.	2025
Service Territory 14	Quraishi, Muzaffar M.	2026
Service Territory 14	Stribling, Jason W.	2023
Service Territory 14	Tickle, John D.	2026
Service Territory 14	Van Horn, Daniel	2022
Service Territory 14	Wood, Carter J.	2025
Service Territory 15	Barksdale, David P.	2024
Service Territory 15	Barnes, Bobby H.	2026
Service Territory 15	Clark, III, Henry C.	2023
Service Territory 15	Haines, Sr., Stanley K.	2024
Service Territory 15	Kluttz, Mickey L.	2023
Service Territory 15	Larson, Mark	2022
Service Territory 15	Matzinger, Michael D.	2025
Service Territory 15	May III, Craig	2026
Service Territory 15	Surrett, Rev. David C.	2022
Service Territory 16	Alexander III, James M.	2026
Service Territory 16	Gilliland, William D.	2026
Service Territory 16	Griner, Jr., Charles H.	2023
Service Territory 16	Hochhaulsler, Thomas C.	2025
Service Territory 16	Iennaco, Amy	2024
Service Territory 16	Swain, Robert C.	2024
Service Territory 16	Thielen, James	2022
Service Territory 16	Wenner III, Warren	2026
Western	Abbey, Arthur R	1977
Western	Adams, Dr. F.C	1950
Western	Alexander, Don	1948
Western	Alexander, Richard	1993
Western	Allan, Vernon A.	1974
Western	Allen, Dantzelle L.	2007
Western	Allen, Ray M.	1950
Western	Allen, Thomas L.	1967
Western	Alsip Jr., John F.	1958
Western	Alton, John E	1994
Western	Amerman, Neil. A.	1970
Western	Amick, Robert D.	1999
Western	Anderson, Paul	2000
Western	Anderson, Phelps	1999
Western	Anderson, Thomas T.	1981
Western	Andrew, Verl J.	1992
Western	Arnold, Donald R.	1974
Western	Arnold, Ross	2020
Western	Arriola, James B.	2009
Western	Ashbee, Gordon C.	1959
Western	Ashton, Marvin H.	1963
Western	Atherton, Harvey H.	1946
Western	Atihey, Victor	1968
Western	Ault, Glenn T.	2011
Western	Austin, Gen. Staryl	1980
Western	Backman, Robert	1983
Western	Baggs, Edwin S.	1966
Western	Baker, Alton F.	1945
Western	Baker, Edwin M.	1965
Western	Baker, Frederick E.	1978
Western	Baker, Kevin	2017
Western	Baker, Sheldon	1993
Western	Ballantyne, Curtis	2003
Western	Ballard, Kendal	1997
Western	Barlow, J. Stanley	1972
Western	Barrett, Michael H.	1985
Western	Bartholomew, Carol	1997
Western	Bateman, E. Allen	1955
Western	Bauer, Henry L.	1991
Western	Baum, Robert S.	1944
Western	Baur, Warren	2003
Western	Bayless, Charles E.	1997
Western	Beckett, Scott	2015
Western	Bean, James H.	1989
Western	Bear, Howard A.	1970
Western	Beatie, Dan W.	1956
Western	Bechtel, Kenneth K.	1949
Western	Beck, David L.	2013
Western	Beecher, Leo	2001
Western	Beers, Clarence G.	2002
Western	Behal, Martha Jo	1981
Western	Behar, Jacques	2017
Western	Bekins, Milo W.	1952
Western	Bell, Rex	1955
Western	Bell, Robert E.	1994
Western	Bell, W.A.	1945
Western	Bennett, II, Thomas	1990
Western	Benson, Ezra Taft	1951
Western	Bent, William W.	1987
Western	Bergren, Homer	1960
Western	Berkus, David W.	1997
Western	Bernard, Frank S.	1973
Western	Bethke, William C.	2000
Western	Bingham, Wayne E.	1996
Western	Bishop Jr., C. Morton	1969
Western	Bishop, Del	2012
Western	Bishop, Roma	2012
Western	Bishop, Wayne R.	2001
Western	Bjornlie, Conrad	1952
Western	Blackburn, William	1978
Western	Bliss, Michael D.	2006
Western	Blom, Carl F.	2002
Western	Boettcher Sr., Richard	1987
Western	Bolin, Wesley	1974
Western	Bolster, Richard	1983
Western	Boltezar, Frank F.	1979
Western	Bond, Lester E.	1967
Western	Bonesteel III, Gen. Charles H.	1968
Western	Bouchard, Francis H.	2018
Western	Bostwick, Jeffrey S.	2015
Western	Bowen, Stephen L.	1999
Western	Bower, Ken	2011
Western	Bradley, Roy G.	1975
Western	Bradley, Steven D.	2005
Western	Brady, Rodney H.	1976
Western	Brasher, Burton F.	1973
Western	Bray, A.F.	1951
Western	Breithaupt Jr., Richard	1990
Western	Brenner, Richard M.	2013
Western	Brewer, Douglas G.	2008
Western	Bristol, Harry	1981
Western	Britz, Martin	1961
Western	Brock, Danny R.	2015
Western	Brown, David S.	2006
Western	Brown, Donn B.	1982
Western	Brown, E.J.	1984
Western	Brown, Wendell P.	1958
Western	Bruckhart, J.R.	1948
Western	Brunkow, Almon F.	1978
Western	Bryson, James E.	1972
Western	Buckner, E. LaMar	1983
Western	Bullock, E.B.	1948
Western	Bunderson, Harold	1992
Western	Burch, William B.	1972
Western	Burdick, Charles	1956
Western	Burgess, Dean R.	2009
Western	Burke, Earl S.	1987
Western	Burman, Owen K.	1966
Western	Burshears, J.F.	1953
Western	Busdeicker Jr., G	1979
Western	Butler Sr., Ross E.	1991
Western	Cameron, Richard	1987
Western	Campbell, Peter R.	1953
Western	Cannon, George 0.	1984
Western	Capanella, Phillip A.	1979
Western	Capps, Toby	2010
Western	Carey, Thomas E.	1979
Western	Carlson, C.J.	1952
Western	Carlson, Richard A.	1995
Western	Carlson, Ronald J.	1997
Western	Carnes, W.C.	1956
Western	Carns, Robert B.	2013
Western	Carr, Thomas Robert	2000
Western	Carter, Edwin L.	1994
Western	Chambers, DeAnn	1985
Western	Champ, Frederick P.	1947
Western	Christen, Harvey C.	1967
Western	Christiansen, Brent	2005
Western	Christiansen, Gary D.	2011
Western	Christiansen, Walter	1981
Western	Christofero, L.	2003
Western	Christoffersen, O.H.	1952
Western	Churchill, Frank C.	1957
Western	Clancy, Maury M.	1969
Western	Clapp, Norton	1948
Western	Clark, DaCosta	1977
Western	Clark, Earl E.	1983
Western	Clayburn, Kent D.	2003
Western	Clements, Robert V.	1973
Western	Close, O.H.	1960
Western	Clyde, Paul	2014
Western	Clyde, Wilfred W.	1960
Western	Coffin, Clarence E.	1975
Western	Coleman, J. Robert	2011
Western	Collins, Truman	1947
Western	Coltrin, J. Mac	1970
Western	Condit, Phillip M.	2007
Western	Collett, William C.	2015
Western	Conley, Stephen	2000
Western	Connor, Wil B.	2002
Western	Conrad, Walter A.	1955
Western	Cook, Mervin “Ray”	2006
Western	Coombs, Keith	2010
Western	Cope, David	2004
Western	Copeland, Mark G.	1995
Western	Corsen, Burton A.	1991
Western	Cottam, John L.	2003
Western	Cowles, William H.	1962
Western	Cowles III, William H.	1977
Western	Cox, John E.	1978
Western	Creighton Jr., John	1992
Western	Cronk, William F.	1996
Western	Cross, John L.	2002
Western	Crum, Gary E.	2013
Western	Cullen, Patrick J.	1973
Western	Curtis, Elbert R.	1952
Western	Cushman III, John	1995
Western	Czatt, John H.	1964
Western	Daegling, William A.	1990
Western	Dahl, Loren S.	1963
Western	Dahlquist II, Charles	2006
Western	Dale, Edward R.	1969
Western	Danby, Jack E.	1971
Western	Danglade, F. Jack	1957
Western	D'Arcy, Paul	1988
Western	Dauterive, Peter W.	1973
Western	Davis, Bruce	1998
Western	Deal, Edson H.	1964
Western	Dean, George M.	1963
Western	Dean, MajGen. William F.	1961
Western	Dellenbach, Robert	2000
Western	Dembo, Jack	1978
Western	Derby, Stephen A.	1974
Western	Derryberry, Randy	2002
Western	Deukmejian, Governor George	1984
Western	Dezember, Rayburn	1992
Western	Diaz, Donald	2004
Western	Dietler, Cortlandt	1993
Western	Dievendorf, Laurie	1980
Western	Dievendorf, Robert	1981
Western	Dike, H.E.	1950
Western	Dillingham, Walter F.	1952
Western	Disney, John E.	2011
Western	Dixon, Robert	2019
Western	Dobashi, Masao	1999
Western	Dochterman, Clifford	1981
Western	Dofflemyer, W. Todd	1953
Western	Dolan, Msgr. James	1951
Western	Dollar, Gary S.	2009
Western	Dolliver, James M.	1976
Western	Doughty, Sterling B.	1960
Western	Douglas Jr., Donald	1983
Western	Downing, Dennis G.	2008
Western	Doyle, Kevin	2002
Western	Drexler, Fred	1965
Western	Duff, Kenneth W.	1982
Western	Eacker, Joel Andrew	2007
Western	Easton, Stanly A.	1946
Western	Edelson, Zanley C.	1960
Western	Edwards, Thomas C.	2015
Western	Ehmann, Anthony V.	1994
Western	Ehret, Paul D.	1961
Western	Eilertsen, Leo	1959
Western	Eldridge, Don	1962
Western	Emmer, Donald S.	2001
Western	Erickson, Charles E.	1999
Western	Ernestburg, A.E.	1996
Western	Eubank, Charles	2019
Western	Evans, Gov. Daniel J.	1970
Western	Fairbanks, Bryce J.	1979
Western	Faires, C.C.	1946
Western	Falconer, Maynard	1979
Western	Fanning, Rosco L.	1963
Western	Farrell, Nancy	2019
Western	Featherstone, Vaughn	1977
Western	Felix, John Henry	1992
Western	Feller Jr., Jack H.	1975
Western	Feltman, Roland D.	1963
Western	Fife, Douglas J.	1980
Western	Fink, Julius J.	1977
Western	Fisher, Allan D.	1985
Western	Fitzgerald, George F.	1954
Western	FlaHavhan, Holland	1993
Western	Flanagan, George C.	1961
Western	Fleischhauer, M.	1999
Western	Fleischmann, Max C.	1944
Western	Fleming, Donovan	1989
Western	Flock, Richard	1998
Western	Fluetsch, John J.	1958
Western	Fluetsch, Michael	1988
Western	Fluetsch, Peter Jay	1984
Western	Fluor, John Robert	1983
Western	Flynn, J. Leo	1956
Western	Foley, Mike	2005
Western	Follmer, Hugh C.	1985
Western	Forker, Floyd W.	1957
Western	Fosseen, Neal R.	1969
Western	Foster, Donald	2003
Western	Fowler, Glenn A.	1969
Western	Fox, W. Turney	1962
Western	Franklin, Nick	2007
Western	Fredman, Judge W.R.	1987
Western	Free, MajGen. Ray D.	1984
Western	Freiberger, Irwin	1999
Western	Fretz, Donald R.	1977
Western	Fritzsche, Ronald Alan	1992
Western	Fry, Leslie M.	1968
Western	Fujimoto, Richard	1988
Western	Fujimoto, Robert M.	1971
Western	Fukuda, Julie C.	1995
Western	Gaines, Stephen F.	2009
Western	Galloway, Kenneth	1994
Western	Gardner, Larry L.	1968
Western	Garrison, Earle E.	1967
Western	Gary, James F.	1977
Western	Gay, Frank William	1973
Western	Gellert, N. Henry	1957
Western	Genzberger, Earle	1958
Western	Gibbons, Morton R.	1950
Western	Gibson, Larry	2010
Western	Gilbert, Paul E.	1987
Western	Giles, John D.	1950
Western	Gilliland, Joshua	2019
Western	Gilson, Gladys	1998
Western	Ginsberg, Samuel	1953
Western	Glass Jr., Clem C.	1947
Western	Glassley, Ray H.	1947
Western	Gledhill, Barton L.	2007
Western	Goldblatt, Marshall	1972
Western	Goldware, Michael	2001
Western	Grable, D. Ray	1960
Western	Grable, Dr. Eldon	1984
Western	Grandin, Henry B.	1951
Western	Grant, Eugene L.	2015
Western	Grant, Shari Wick	1987
Western	Grassli, Michaelene	1989
Western	Graves, David	2017
Western	Gray, John D.	1964
Western	Greene, Alva D.	1974
Western	Gregg Sr., Ben H.	1961
Western	Griffin, Janet C.	2018
Western	Grigg, F. Nephi	1969
Western	Grimm, Frederick	2014
Western	Groat, Albert A.	2003
Western	Grubb, Esten	1992
Western	Guardipee, Francis	1948
Western	Gubbins, James J.	1965
Western	Gubler, Mark	2016
Western	Haggland, Dr. Paul B.	1963
Western	Hale, R.B.	1944
Western	Hall, John W.	1973
Western	Hall, Marshall S.	1954
Western	Halliday, David E.	1999
Western	Ham, Lee E.	1973
Western	Hamreus, Robert G.	1974
Western	Hankla, James	2004
Western	Hanks, Marion D.	1970
Western	Hanks, Stephen G.	2008
Western	Hansen, Donald J.	1998
Western	Hansen, Marsha M.	1984
Western	Hansen, Dr. Peter	2019
Western	Hansen, Zenon C.R.	1951
Western	Hanusa, Arnold	1971
Western	Harber, Dr. J.N.	1951
Western	Hardebeck, Michael	2010
Western	Harding, George L.	1951
Western	Harris, Gene M.	1965
Western	Harris, J. Leonard	1978
Western	Harris, Michael D.	1988
Western	Harris, Victor E.	1997
Western	Harrison, James T.	1966
Western	Harvey, Dr. H.L.	1967
Western	Hashimoto, Robert	1993
Western	Hashiro, Brian S.	2006
Western	Hatfield, Mark O.	1966
Western	Hathaway, Richard	2020
Western	Hathaway, Samuel	1997
Western	Haught, Harold B.	1971
Western	Hawkes, Ezra M.	1962
Western	Hayashi, Henry Ken	2014
Western	Heacock, Harold W.	1994
Western	Hedman, David	2016
Western	Hekter, William	2002
Western	Helhena, Leslie	1950
Western	Helman, Paul	2020
Western	Hemmelman, K.	2009
Western	Herms, William B.	1946
Western	Hess, John	2000
Western	Hester, Gerald A.	2004
Western	Hetherington, Wesley	1957
Western	Hibbard, Robert G.	1952
Western	Hill, George R.	1946
Western	Hill Jr., George R.	1965
Western	Hill, Matthew W.	1952
Western	Hill, Ralph J.	1986
Western	Hirth, Frank W.	1964
Western	Hiser, Eric L.	2014
Western	Hishiro, Brian S.	2006
Western	Hoag II, George	1968
Western	Hoff, Harvey O.	1954
Western	Hoffman, Edward D.	1956
Western	Hoffman, Harry B.	1946
Western	Hoffman, Michael G.	2003
Western	Hohmann, Gilbert G.	1970
Western	Holmes, Hugh	1958
Western	Holmes, Lester A.	1989
Western	Holmes, Lester J.	1953
Western	Holt, Gregory	2002
Western	Hopkins, Alfred E.	1953
Western	Horn, Albert J.	1978
Western	Hoyt, Harland	1946
Western	Huffman, Minor S.	1989
Western	Hughes, Richard W.	1982
Western	Hull, Cindy	2020
Western	Hummel, Peter W.	1975
Western	Hunsaker, Hyrum B.	1964
Western	Hunsaker, R. Lawry	1994
Western	Hurd, Richard L.	2005
Western	Hurst, William S.	1997
Western	Hyink, David M.	2003
Western	Irvine, Myford	1954
Western	Jackson, Brent	2004
Western	Jackson, Glenn L.	1978
Western	Jansen, Donald E.	1973
Western	Jenkins, Ray	1955
Western	Jergensen, E.M.	1949
Western	Jewell, James E.	1980
Western	Johnson, Clifford M.	1974
Western	Johnson, Ed.D.	1975
Western	Johnson, Francis	1988
Western	Johnson, James E.	1974
Western	Johnson, Marvin D.	1975
Western	Johnson, Neal R.	1998
Western	Johnson, Steven B.	2005
Western	Johnston, Robert	2012
Western	Jones, Harold T.	1955
Western	Jones, Robert Henry	1991
Western	Jongeneel, Albert M.	1962
Western	Josepho, Anatol	1947
Western	Kagawa, Richard	2016
Western	Kagawa, Siegfred	1989
Western	Kampa, Dennis	1999
Western	Karmel, I.	1944
Western	Kasman, Martin A.	2007
Western	Kaulfuss, Gail B.	1996
Western	Keegan, John C.	2013
Western	Keene, Janet	2010
Western	Kelch, Maxwell	1965
Western	Kendall, Richard H.	1974
Western	Kennedy, Harold W.	1946
Western	Kent, Roy L.	1962
Western	Kern, Howard	2010
Western	Kerr, Henry	1959
Western	Kientz, Richard	2000
Western	Kimball, John	1958
Western	Kintner, Dr. Donald	2000
Western	Kirkham, Oscar A.	1949
Western	Kittredge, Robert	2004
Western	Knight, Andrew S.	2007
Western	Knight, Lyle R.	1994
Western	Knott, Walter	1962
Western	Knowles, Fred H.	1968
Western	Knudsen, Duncan H.	1967
Western	Koeb, Richard W.	1981
Western	Kometani, Katsumi	1972
Western	Kraft, Eadie A.	1985
Western	Krebs, Ward C.	1971
Western	Krogen, Gwen	2002
Western	Kunz, James F.	2018
Western	Lacy, O.J.	1949
Western	Ladd, Wilbur N.	1983
Western	Laird, Edwin C.	1996
Western	Landon, David E.	1999
Western	Laney, William B.	1963
Western	Langlie, Arthur B.	1951
Western	Lanning, Michael K.	1989
Western	Lant, Cheryl	2010
Western	Larsen, LtGen. Stanley R.	1981
Western	Lentz, Onis C.	1998
Western	Leonard, Allan L.	1944
Western	Leppaluoto, Capt. A.	1953
Western	LeSage, James F.	1975
Western	Levy, Sol G.	1949
Western	Libbin, James	2016
Western	Ling, Dr. Ronald W.Y.	2021
Western	Lipman, Arthur	2017
Western	Lloyd, Robert J.	1957
Western	Loder, Delbert W.	1984
Western	Longoria, Robert J.	2006
Western	Lotzenhiser, George	2004
Western	Loud, P. Tremain	1954
Western	Love, John N.	1990
Western	Lovejoy, Walter E.	1959
Western	Lowe, Marvin O.	1999
Western	Lowe, William R.	1968
Western	Lowman, Zelvin D.	1980
Western	Lyons, David	1964
Western	Lyons II, Michael H.	1989
Western	Lyons, Raymond R.	1962
Western	MacColtrin, J.	1969
Western	Maclay, Edgar	1944
Western	Maddox, Jack F.	1958
Western	Magruder, Philip S.	1960
Western	Malaney, Timothy I.	2012
Western	Mangus, Rodney	2017
Western	Manley, Murray E.	1979
Western	Manville Jr., H.E.	1972
Western	Manz, John	2011
Western	Mardikian, George	1955
Western	Markham, Don C.	1966
Western	Marks, Ray E.	1956
Western	Marlett, D. Loring	1969
Western	Marshall, Joseph W.	1961
Western	Martin, George	1967
Western	Martin, Tom	1950
Western	Martinez, Carlos G.	2008
Western	Matinson, Norman J.	1982
Western	Mason, William R.	1972
Western	Matheison, Robert J.	1966
Western	Matich, Martin A.	1985
Western	Matousek, William J.	1956
Western	Maxfield, Dan	2005
Western	Maxon, Jack G.	1995
Western	Mayall, Broun H.	1978
Western	Mayer, Edith M.	2005
Western	McCarthy, Doris R.	2014
Western	McCaughan, Philip	1946
Western	McClintic, Richard C.	1991
Western	McCurry Jr., Harold	1976
Western	McDonald, Karen B.	1995
Western	McEldowney, Robert	2009
Western	McHenry, Tim	2010
Western	McKay, David O.	1956
Western	McKay, Donald E.	1969
Western	McLane, Laurence S.	1966
Western	McLaughlin, Glen	1990
Western	McLaughlin, John T.	1968
Western	McWilliams, Edwin	1968
Western	Mei, Anthony L.	2016
Western	Melczer, Joseph T.	1951
Western	Mensinger, John	1982
Western	Menzies, A. Roy	1984
Western	Menzies, Charles M.	1952
Western	Mercer, F. Bruce	1973
Western	Mesker, Rebecca	2018
Western	Michael, Martin W.	1976
Western	Migita, Ronald K.	2013
Western	Miller, Stanley	2000
Western	Mills, Edward	1963
Western	Mills, John B.	1957
Western	Mills, Lyle T.	2009
Western	Mills, Richard L.	1993
Western	Mitchell, George H.	2009
Western	Moffat, Paul Lawrence	2014
Western	Moffitt Jr., A. Hubbard	1949
Western	Monson Jr., Arch	1968
Western	Montgomery, John	1971
Western	Monville Jr., Louis	1986
Western	Moody, Todd L.	2021
Western	Moore, W. Frederick	1996
Western	Morris Jr., Charles S.	1958
Western	Morris, George Q.	1944
Western	Morrison, Charles F.	1948
Western	Morrison, Kenneth	1948
Western	Mortensen, J.D.	1975
Western	Moshier, Kevin P.	2006
Western	Mowbray, Hon. John	1983
Western	Multz, Carroll E.	1995
Western	Murphy, Michael J.	2007
Western	Murray, Eugene W.	2005
Western	Myers, A. J.	1980
Western	Neesam, Ralph F.	1959
Western	Neider, Michael A.	2008
Western	Nelson, George M.	1987
Western	Nelson, Hortense	1987
Western	Nichol, Jake	2021
Western	Nicholson, Wilmot J.	1970
Western	Nicolaysen, S. Carl	2010
Western	Niderost, Robert C.	2001
Western	Nielson, Ivan	1964
Western	Nishikubo, Thomas	1999
Western	Noble, Robert J.	2021
Western	Noonan, Bruce D., M.D.	2015
Western	Norgren, Carl A.	1947
Western	Northrop, John K.	1955
Western	Oki, Scott D.	2013
Western	Okuhara, Lawrence	1989
Western	Oliver, Glen P.	1978
Western	Oppenheimer, Arthur F.	2012
Western	O’Rourke, Dennis J.	2003
Western	Osborn, Charles F.	1966
Western	Overholt, Helen	1983
Western	Overholt, Orval	2000
Western	Owens, Claude M.	1964
Western	Packer, Thane J.	1994
Western	Palmer, Elmer W.	2003
Western	Palumbo, James	1959
Western	Parachini Jr., Victor	2005
Western	Pardee, George M.	1975
Western	Pardee, Kathy	1988
Western	Parmley, Lavern W.	1975
Western	Patrick, James E.	1961
Western	Patterson, Paul	1953
Western	Paulsen, George A.	1972
Western	Paulson, Lou	2019
Western	Pearson, Rodney	1971
Western	Peck, Col. Allen S.	1944
Western	Pepka, Cheri	2008
Western	Perkins, Jan	1994
Western	Perkins, Michael	2008
Western	Perry, Wayne	2004
Western	Peters, Edward J.	1968
Western	Petersen, Mark E.	1961
Western	Petersen, Raymond	1964
Western	Peterson, Jack L.	2016
Western	Philbrook, Michael	2011
Western	Phillips, Stephen H.	2021
Western	Phillips, William L.	1947
Western	Piantoni, Donald M.	2001
Western	Piepergerdes, C.C.	1970
Western	Pierce, Edwin B.	1975
Western	Pigott, Charles M.	1985
Western	Pillsbury, Edwin S.	1958
Western	Pinegar, Rex	1988
Western	Pintar, Lee A.	1995
Western	Pitchess, Peter J.	1980
Western	Platt, William B.	1956
Western	Plumb, Hylon T.	1944
Western	Pollock, George G.	1950
Western	Pollock, John P.	1991
Western	Polson, C. Stuart	1953
Western	Porter III, Joseph E.	2010
Western	Pote, Harold F.	1962
Western	Pratt Jr., C. Dudley	1992
Western	Pratt Sr., C. Dudley	1949
Western	Price, Mary Ann	2003
Western	Price, Randy K.	2008
Western	Priest, George G.	1969
Western	Prior, James C.	2021
Western	Prior, Susan Wyn	2000
Western	Pritchard, Fay	1947
Western	Purcell, Robert H.	2005
Western	Purdy, George I.	1987
Western	Quincy, Robert C.	1986
Western	Quinn, James W.	1971
Western	Radcliff, Dale	2017
Western	Ramirez, Frank R.	2009
Western	Ramsdell, Vittz-James	1960
Western	Rands, Lawrence David	2020
Western	Rasmusen, Richford	1975
Western	Rasmuson, Elmer E.	1974
Western	Rasmussen, Irving C.	1986
Western	Ratcliff, Hardy V.	1980
Western	Reid, E.F.	1979
Western	Reimers, Lee	2000
Western	Rettowski, Barry C.	2018
Western	Reynolds, Sydney	2005
Western	Rich, David	2011
Western	Richards, Herbert M.	1967
Western	Richards, LeGrand	1958
Western	Richards, Richard E.	1983
Western	Richards, Seth	1945
Western	Ricks, Edwin Adair	1959
Western	Rogers, James	2010
Western	Rolfe, Hamilton C.	1945
Western	Rolley, Alan W.	1991
Western	Roney, James N.	1960
Western	Rooney, Michael R.	2006
Western	Rosenberg, Nathan	2004
Western	Rosenlieb, Jay L.	2021
Western	Rosequist, Theodore	1961
Western	Routh, Ross H.	1970
Western	Roy, Douglass F.	1976
Western	Rubino, Frank G.	1986
Western	Rude, Joseph	1968
Western	Russell, John Henry	1949
Western	Russell, Ray L.	1971
Western	Russell Jr., Robert	2007
Western	Russon, John M.	1976
Western	Ryland, Glen L.	1985
Western	Sawyer, Franklin D.	1972
Western	Sawyer, Gregory Dean	2012
Western	Schade, Larry	1946
Western	Scherf, Paul	2016
Western	Scholes, William A.	1990
Western	Schrimp, Roger M.	1997
Western	Schuler, Alison K.	2011
Western	Scott, Larry	2000
Western	Sharp, Janet	1988
Western	Sharpe, Merrill J.	1963
Western	Sharpe, O.D.	1970
Western	Shavel, George H.	1977
Western	Shaw, Richard A.	1982
Western	Sheen, Jackson	2006
Western	Sheen, Patricia J.	2006
Western	Shepard, Irving	1957
Western	Sherick, Jack M.	1996
Western	Shiner, D.A.	1946
Western	Shinn, Ten Sung	1979
Western	Shirota-Benevedes, H.	2005
Western	Sholar, Bill J.	1985
Western	Shumaker, Calvin M.	1981
Western	Shumm, Ralph W.	1962
Western	Shumway, Naomi	1980
Western	Silbiger, Steven Robert	2012
Western	Silcox, Myrl B.	1993
Western	Simpson, Robert L.	1973
Western	Simpson, Sherwood	1985
Western	Sinclair, Robert F.	1996
Western	Sloan, John K.	1974
Western	Smart Sr., Philip M.	1999
Western	Smigun, Kathy	1997
Western	Smith Jr., G. Carlos	1964
Western	Smith, Leo C.	1992
Western	Smith, Wesley J.	2009
Western	Smith, William T.	1963
Western	Smylie, Robert E.	1966
Western	Snoddy, Sam	1997
Western	Sowards, Paul A.	2015
Western	Spalding, Andrew T.	1955
Western	Speirs, LeRoy K.	1978
Western	Spohn, Debbie K.	2007
Western	Spurgeon III, William	1953
Western	Stapley, Delbert L.	1957
Western	Star, Frank O.	1981
Western	Stark, Verl	1982
Western	Stark Jr., William W.	2007
Western	Starr, Frank O.	1981
Western	Stearns, Robert L.	1960
Western	Sted, Charles A.	2008
Western	Steig, Lester R.	1974
Western	Stephens, W. Barclay	1944
Western	Stevens, Bradley M.	2011
Western	Stevens, Mary E.	2008
Western	Stevens, Ralph W.	1949
Western	Stevenson, A. Walter	1953
Western	Stiff, Judd	2018
Western	Stillman, Donald L.	1991
Western	Stimpson, Irving E.	1965
Western	Stolowitz, Mark	1999
Western	Stone, Royal	1978
Western	Stonehouse, James	1999
Western	Stowell, Judith	1990
Western	Stringham, Robert	2019
Western	Strong, Ernest A.	1954
Western	Studer, Raymond A.	1973
Western	Suchan, Scott	2016
Western	Sumpf, Hans R.	1954
Western	Sutton Jr., Philip	1982
Western	Swaner, Keith	1995
Western	Tabb, Tom	1993
Western	Tabor, James H.	1974
Western	Taggart, Jesse McNiven	1983
Western	Tamkin, Caren R.	2006
Western	Taylor, Cloyd	1986
Western	Taylor, Gordon H.	1974
Western	Taylor, Robert D.	1977
Western	Tegland, Vernon S.	1973
Western	TerBorch, Jr., Lester F.	2018
Western	Thayer, Wade W.	1944
Western	Thiriot Jr., Richard V.	1982
Western	Thomas, Gerald C.	1956
Western	Thomas, Richard V.	1991
Western	Thomson, Henry H.	1979
Western	Thrailkill, W. Lou	1963
Western	Tongue, Gordon	1955
Western	Trentman, Rich	2020
Western	Truitt, George W.	1959
Western	Tucker, William M.	1981
Western	Tuntland, Larry	2011
Western	Turner, Lawrence	2019
Western	Ueoka, Meyer	1991
Western	Van Derbur, Francis	1981
Western	Vanderheyden, E.	2005
Western	Van Patten, Edward	1991
Western	Vaughn, Linda	2020
Western	Vehr, Urban J.	1967
Western	Villasenor, Al	1946
Western	Vinnedge, R.W.	1945
Western	Virgin, Jim	2012
Western	Vowell Jr., Jack	1982
Western	Vowell Sr., Jack	1955
Western	Waananen, Arvi O.	1977
Western	Wadford, Judy K.	2008
Western	Waldron, Michael H.	1958
Western	Walker, Arnell R.	1996
Western	Walker, Richard F.	1989
Western	Walters, Daniel	2014
Western	Warren, Harold A.	1980
Western	Watson, M.T. “Bud”	1990
Western	Watson, Noel G.	2007
Western	Watzek, Aubrey	1961
Western	Watts, Kevin	1993
Western	Webb, Martin M.	2014
Western	Wegener, Theo H.	1946
Western	Weierman, Sue	1996
Western	Welch, Toni A.	2021
Western	Wellington, Col. M.B.	1947
Western	Wells Jr., Challen H.	1989
Western	Wente, Carl F.	1954
Western	West, J.W.	1946
Western	Wherry, Charles W.	1949
Western	Whidden, Walter R.	1977
Western	White, Marvin	1988
Western	Whitehead, James	1957
Western	Whitsett, William	1959
Western	Wiedeman, Arthur F.	1947
Western	Wight, Holland E.	1950
Western	Wiley Jr., Robert	1993
Western	Williams, Charles	2020
Western	Williams, Kelly H.	2009
Western	Williams, Luke G.	1986
Western	Williams, Walter C.	1967
Western	Williamson Jr. Francis	1954
Western	Wilson, David A.	2013
Western	Wilson, Donald C.	1969
Western	Wilson, Elwood J.	1970
Western	Wofford, George T.	1977
Western	Wong, James W.Y.	1993
Western	Woodward, Leonard	2003
Western	Wooten, Clyde W.	1989
Western	Wootten, Richard K.	1971
Western	Workman, Ange	2017
Western	Wrath, Patricia	2017
Western	Wright, Donald F.	1995
Western	Wylie, Lisa	2018
Western	Wyss, E. Robert	1985
Western	Yant, James H.	1966
Western	Yates, St. Clair	1995
Western	Yocum, Harold A.	1996
Western	Yokote, Jack	1961
Western	Young, Dwan J.	1986
Western	Young, Henry J.	1982
Western	Yunker, J. Murray	1974
Western	Zuppe, William W.	1994
Southern	Abramson, Ralph	1970
Southern	Acker, F. Murray	1965
Southern	Acree, Frank M.	1955
Southern	Acree Jr., John	1961
Southern	Adams, Glenn A.	2005
Southern	Adams Jr., Irving	1964
Southern	Aide, John E.	2000
Southern	Akerman, Joseph	1977
Southern	Alexander, Joe P.	1977
Southern	Alexander, Lester	1948
Southern	Allen, Austin F.	1960
Southern	Allen, Ivan	1950
Southern	Alley, Wallace D.	1995
Southern	Allison, Norlyn L.	2009
Southern	Almond, E.M.	1972
Southern	Angell, George R.	1948
Southern	Aran, Fernando	2012
Southern	Arboleya, Carlos J.	1999
Southern	Armstrong, Ralph	1990
Southern	Armstrong Jr., C.J. “Pete”	2013
Southern	Aspley, W.D.	1996
Southern	Atherholt, George	1992
Southern	Atkinson, Carol H.	1997
Southern	Austin, J. Paul	1973
Southern	Austin Jr., T. Louis	1972
Southern	Bahler, Denise K.	2015
Southern	Bahler, Larry	2010
Southern	Bailey, Carl E.	1992
Southern	Bailey, J. Russell	1958
Southern	Baker, John E.	1973
Southern	Baldwin, Arthur C.	1945
Southern	Baldwin, Robert M.	2011
Southern	Ballard Jr., George	1983
Southern	Banks, William N.	1945
Southern	Barker, Kimberly	2010
Southern	Barnett, Carol and Barney	2012
Southern	Barnhardt, J.J.	1943
Southern	Barnhardt, William	1949
Southern	Bass, Perry R.	1969
Southern	Bauer, Cecil	1970
Southern	Beachamp, Tom L.	1952
Southern	Beare III, Robert L.	1985
Southern	Bechtol, Hubert	1979
Southern	Beck, Eugene M.	1978
Southern	Belk, John M.	1962
Southern	Bell, Jack Allen	1973
Southern	Bell, John S.	1969
Southern	Bell, John T.	2010
Southern	Bell, L. Roland	2010
Southern	Bell, LeRoy	1978
Southern	Benedict Jr., A	1981
Southern	Bennett, Henry G.	1950
Southern	Bernard, Charles	1970
Southern	Berry, Everett E.	1983
Southern	Bevington, E.M.	1995
Southern	Bicket, Paul C.	2009
Southern	Biegler, David	2011
Southern	Biggerstaff, L.Y.	1954
Southern	Billica, Harry R.	1980
Southern	Biondo, Raymond	1983
Southern	Bird Jr., David F.	2004
Southern	Birdsong Jr., T.H.	1959
Southern	Bitting, Clarence R.	1943
Southern	Blass II, Gus	1966
Southern	Blass III, Gus	1987
Southern	Blaylock, T.H.	1981
Southern	Block, Nelson R.	1994
Southern	Blount, W.H.	1984
Southern	Boddie, Nicholas	2000
Southern	Boone, William D.	1949
Southern	Borchelt, Merle L.	1995
Southern	Borda, Paul	1964
Southern	Boswell, Chris	1998
Southern	Boulton, John W.	1980
Southern	Bovay Jr., Harry	1976
Southern	Bowdon, J. Henry	1960
Southern	Bowerman, Charles	1993
Southern	Bowers, Lawrence	1975
Southern	Boxwell, Leslie G.	1957
Southern	Bradshaw, Robert	1970
Southern	Bragga, Richard P.	2011
Southern	Bramlett, Terry Dewel	2013
Southern	Brannom M.D., Dale B.	1991
Southern	Bratton, VC	1967
Southern	Breathitt, Edward	1967
Southern	Brice Jr., Houston	1977
Southern	Briese, Shawn L.	2012
Southern	Briscoe, David L.	1996
Southern	Briscoe Jr., Dolph	1973
Southern	Brogdon, E.L.	1984
Southern	Brower, E.N.	1960
Southern	Brown, Allen D.	2004
Southern	Brown, Dorothy R. "Dottie"	2018
Southern	Brown, Rex I.	1944
Southern	Brown, Thomas W.	1999
Southern	Brown, W.C.	1948
Southern	Brown III, Walter	1982
Southern	Bryant, Jack E.	1984
Southern	Burdick, Richard L.	1991
Southern	Burger, K. Robert	1987
Southern	Burrow, A.K.	1953
Southern	Busbee, George D.	1978
Southern	Butler, Jack	2001
Southern	Cadwallader, John	1944
Southern	Cahoon, Wilber G.	2006
Southern	Caldwell, John	1972
Southern	Callaway, Jack	1993
Southern	Calloway Jr., Cason	1964
Southern	Campbell, A. Boyd	1953
Southern	Campbell, Chris	2008
Southern	Campbell, George	1978
Southern	Campbell, William	1950
Southern	Cannon, Diane M.	2008
Southern	Capp, Ray T.	2006
Southern	Cargill, Robert L.	1967
Southern	Carlock, Keller S.	2014
Southern	Carlson, A.	1945
Southern	Carmoney, Maxine	1997
Southern	Carney, Frederick	2001
Southern	Carr, Charles T.	2006
Southern	Carrington, Joe C.	1948
Southern	Governor Carroll, Julian M.	1977
Southern	Carson, Luther R.	1946
Southern	Carter, William E.	1959
Southern	Casey, John J.	1980
Southern	Cash, C.D.	2000
Southern	Cash, James Hunter	2017
Southern	Castle, Stephen N.	2000
Southern	Chadwick, William	1958
Southern	Chambers, Henry	1967
Southern	Chambers, W. Arnold	1971
Southern	Chapman, Lamar	1970
Southern	Chapman, Edward "Andy"	2020
Southern	Chapman, William	1964
Southern	Chase, Larry	2015
Southern	Cheatham, J.M.	1955
Southern	Cherry, John	2019
Southern	Chesser, Alec	1971
Southern	Childers, Dale	2005
Southern	Chisholm, Lewis F.	1976
Southern	Clapp, Kennedy N.	1949
Southern	Clardy Jr., Carlton	1995
Southern	Clark Jr., Richard	2003
Southern	Clark Jr., S.W.	1974
Southern	Clarkson, A.B.	1945
Southern	Clay, Albert C.	1969
Southern	Clayton, Charles	1972
Southern	Clayton, Hugh N.	1968
Southern	Clement, Edwin A.	1953
Southern	Clements Jr., William	1970
Southern	Clendenin, John	1980
Southern	Clendenin, John L.	1990
Southern	Cloar, Robert E.	1982
Southern	Cloar, William C.	1998
Southern	Coberly, Daniel L.	1995
Southern	Cochran, Almond	1949
Southern	Coffield, H.H.	1952
Southern	Coil Jr., James H.	1974
Southern	Coker, Joe R.	1972
Southern	Colburn, Moran	2000
Southern	Coleman, Ronald	2000
Southern	Collier, Howard	1951
Southern	Collier Jr., Theron	2001
Southern	Collins, J.H.	1964
Southern	Collins, Peter H.	2020
Southern	Collins, Ronald	2011
Southern	Combs, Robert H.	1977
Southern	Comer, Hugh M.	1949
Southern	Comer Jr., James	1973
Southern	Cone, Herman	1943
Southern	Cook, Chris L.	2013
Southern	Cooper, L. Gordon	1969
Southern	Cooper, Malcolm	1999
Southern	Copehaver, J.E.	1959
Southern	Copeland, Donna J.	2018
Southern	Couch Jr., Harvey	1950
Southern	Coupland, Frank	1958
Southern	Covington, J. Harris	1966
Southern	Cox, Glenn A.	1987
Southern	Coyle, Robert W.	1978
Southern	Craig, Donald F.	1989
Southern	Craig II, C.A.	1980
Southern	Crane, W. Edward	1988
Southern	Creveling, Louis G.	1987
Southern	Crosby Jr., L.O.	1957
Southern	Crosby Jr., Robert	1967
Southern	Croy, Alvin Q.	2004
Southern	Crutchfield, Frances	2003
Southern	Crutchfield, George	1999
Southern	Cunningham, Bruce	1988
Southern	Cunningham, Donna	2001
Southern	Cunningham, Larry	2005
Southern	Cunningham Jr., Harry	1983
Southern	Curlee, Joseph H.	1989
Southern	Daggett, Bill	2019
Southern	Dalzell, William F.	1961
Southern	Darden Jr., Colgate	1958
Southern	Dare, Donald J.	2015
Southern	Daugette Jr., C.	1975
Southern	Daughtridge Jr., W.	2008
Southern	Davidson, Robert	1987
Southern	Davis, A. Dano	1996
Southern	Davison, Frederick	1977
Southern	Dawley, Lester W.	1954
Southern	Day, Frank B.	1999
Southern	Denny, Jim	2008
Southern	Desai, Devang	2021
Southern	Dethero, Harry L.	1972
Southern	Detterman Jr., G.	2003
Southern	DeVore, Stewart	1969
Southern	Dick, Robert L.	1992
Southern	Dickey, Ernest H.	1950
Southern	Dickson, J. Charles	1972
Southern	Dillon, James Lee	1989
Southern	Dingwerth, Frank	1982
Southern	Dobson, William	1961
Southern	Dodds, James D.	1985
Southern	Domino, Joseph C.	1968
Southern	Domino, Joseph F.	2004
Southern	Donnell Jr., John	1986
Southern	Dryman, Talmagae	1984
Southern	Dukes, Jean Sylvia	2010
Southern	Dukes, William E.	2007
Southern	Duncan, Daniel W.	1986
Southern	Dunn, Sam	2019
Southern	Dye Jr., Roy L.	1977
Southern	Eagles, Joe Elliott	1969
Southern	Eckels, R.E.	1951
Southern	Ehlig, William E.	1947
Southern	Ekle, Barry J.F.	2009
Southern	Elam, William H.	1975
Southern	Elder, James C.	1999
Southern	Elliott, William B.	1977
Southern	Ellis, William D.	1947
Southern	Ellis Jr., Eugene	1972
Southern	Emerson, Cherry L.	1945
Southern	England, Harry	1973
Southern	Ennis, P.C.	1953
Southern	Erwin, Henry P.	1951
Southern	Erwin, William J.	1964
Southern	Evans, Edward B.	1950
Southern	Evans Jr., H. Ray	1978
Southern	Eyesenbach, Wendell	1983
Southern	Fair, Harry Grant	1965
Southern	Fant Jr., George C.	1984
Southern	Faulkner Jr., William	1981
Southern	Fee, Harold D.	1993
Southern	Feltham, James E.	1989
Southern	Fendler, R.E.	1975
Southern	Fenner, Darwin C.	1992
Southern	Ferguson Jr., Harley	1996
Southern	Finch, John	2011
Southern	Fisher, Mary	2012
Southern	Fitch, James P.	1960
Southern	Flanders, Donald	1966
Southern	Flatt, James A.	2011
Southern	Fleming, William	1951
Southern	Flood, Lloyd H.	1983
Southern	Ford, Horatio	1949
Southern	Ford, Governor Wendell H.	1974
Southern	Foster, Frank P.	1983
Southern	Foster Jr., Governor Murphy J. "Mike"	2002
Southern	Fox, Jay W.	2017
Southern	Frady Jr., A. Hampton	1991
Southern	Fraser, LtGen. Joseph Bacon	1961
Southern	Friend, Harold C.	1997
Southern	Fry, George W.	1983
Southern	Fuller, R. Barnwell	1954
Southern	Fuller, Richard	1955
Southern	Fullilove Jr., W.C.	1957
Southern	Fuqua, Nolen J.	1960
Southern	Furbringer, Max	2006
Southern	Furst, Jack D.	2007
Southern	Galloway, Charles	1954
Southern	Galyon, Michael	2006
Southern	Garrett, Carlton L.	1988
Southern	Garrison Jr., David L.	2003
Southern	Garwood, Charles A.	2014
Southern	Garza, Judge Reynaldo G.	1992
Southern	Gaskin, Spurgeon	1983
Southern	Gerber, Steve	2017
Southern	Germany, E.B.	1963
Southern	Gething, William	1986
Southern	Gillette, Harold E.	1952
Southern	Gillis Jr., Norman	1979
Southern	Gilmer, Ben S.	1964
Southern	Gilmer, Philip A.	1997
Southern	Gilmer, Sammie S.	2002
Southern	Gish, Robert H.	1988
Southern	Glanville, Charles	1980
Southern	Glover, Clifford C.	1992
Southern	Glover, Edmund	2007
Southern	Godby, Ronald E.	1977
Southern	Godwin, Chauncey	1976
Southern	Goebel, William	2021
Southern	Goff, Linda L.	2013
Southern	Goff, Robert M.	1965
Southern	Goldman, Moe	1958
Southern	Goodloe, John H.	1970
Southern	Goodman, U.S.	1952
Southern	Goodrich, T.M.	2003
Southern	Gorman, O.B.	1972
Southern	Gouin, Frank	1965
Southern	Grasse, Paul	2017
Southern	Graves, T.C.	1974
Southern	Gray, Cecil	1947
Southern	Gray, Donald J.	1967
Southern	Gray, William P.	1979
Southern	Green, Jamie C.	2021
Southern	Greer, Harry E.	1948
Southern	Grier Jr., John C.	1976
Southern	Griffin, Michael A.	2006
Southern	Griffin, Dr. William Henry	1992
Southern	Griffith Jr., Hugh	1983
Southern	Grogan, Lynn E.	1949
Southern	Guglielmi, William E.	2017
Southern	Hackney III, James	1982
Southern	Haggai, Rev. Thomas	1966
Southern	Hahnan, A.E.	1957
Southern	Hall, J. Floyd	2008
Southern	Hall, Maurice	2009
Southern	Halloran Jr., John	2004
Southern	Hamilton, Carlos	1993
Southern	Hamilton, James E.	2020
Southern	Hamrick, John M.	1946
Southern	Hancock, Jennifer Lee	2016
Southern	Hanckel, Richardson	1966
Southern	Hancock, Frank	1970
Southern	Hanson, Bernold	1976
Southern	Harbin III, Charles T.	2011
Southern	Hardt, John Wesley	1985
Southern	Harper, Frank	2021
Southern	Harper, H. Larry	2010
Southern	Harpole, Paul J.	2004
Southern	Harralson, Grayson	1965
Southern	Harrison, Thomas C.	2014
Southern	Hart, Robert C.	1989
Southern	Harvey, Omar	1978
Southern	Hastings, William	1979
Southern	Hay, Stephen J.	1951
Southern	Hayes Jr., William	2001
Southern	Hecht, Charles K.	2012
Southern	Hecht Jr., Charles	1984
Southern	Hedrick Jr., Oley	1981
Southern	Hembree III, Hugh	1975
Southern	Hembree IV, H. Lawson	2016
Southern	Henderson, Wendy	2009
Southern	Hendren, James K.	2008
Southern	Hendrix, David S.	2016
Southern	Henry, Donald L.	1973
Southern	Hensley, Richard B.	2016
Southern	Hentz, Hal F.	1947
Southern	Hermann, Sally	1986
Southern	Hermann, Ted C.	1981
Southern	Herndon, Francis	1996
Southern	Herndon, Harold	1963
Southern	Hickerson, Carolyn	1991
Southern	Higgins, Albert W.	1945
Southern	Hildebrandt, Herbert	1953
Southern	Hill, Robbie L. Jr	2018
Southern	Hiller, E.A.	1954
Southern	Hitch, Clayton R.	1972
Southern	Hittner, Judge David	1988
Southern	Hodges, A. Gerow	1967
Southern	Hodges, Governor Luther	1960
Southern	Hoff, Stanley D. "Stan"	2018
Southern	Holliday, John	1968
Southern	Hollis, Marshall	1998
Southern	Holloman, Garland	1971
Southern	Holmes, Charles	2007
Southern	Holtkamp, Clarence	1982
Southern	Homburg, Jimmie Smith	2013
Southern	Honan, James T.	1994
Southern	Hood, Jason P.	2012
Southern	Hood, Warren A.	1977
Southern	Horsley, Thomas	1945
Southern	Horton, Ray H.	1964
Southern	Howe Jr., Otis W.	1982
Southern	Hughes, Thomas	1971
Southern	Hunn, W. Harry	1981
Southern	Hunter, James Powell	1959
Southern	Hunter, Thomas	1971
Southern	Hurley, Louis E.	1954
Southern	Hutto, C. Bradley	2019
Southern	Hyatt, Kenneth	2002
Southern	Hyman, Lawrence	1990
Southern	Hyslop, Frederick W., Jr.	2015
Southern	Ingle, I. Paul	1946
Southern	Irving, Jeffrey C.	2001
Southern	Jackson Jr., Nelson	1945
Southern	James, Floyd B.	1961
Southern	Jamison, E.K.	1968
Southern	Jelsema, C. Ben	2003
Southern	Jenkins, George	1974
Southern	Jenkins, John J.	2012
Southern	Jennings, III, John C.	2017
Southern	Jernigan, W. Carl	1985
Southern	Jesperson, C.M.	1960
Southern	Jeter, George W.	1991
Southern	Johnson, C. Stuart	1997
Southern	Johnson, Glendon	1974
Southern	Johnson, J.E.	1956
Southern	Johnson, Jesse W.	1976
Southern	Johnson, Joseph E.	2012
Southern	Johnson, Cassandra H.	2015
Southern	Johnson, Woodrow	1961
Southern	Johnston, Clem D.	1947
Southern	Jonasen, Jeffery	2008
Southern	Jones, A.G.	1947
Southern	Jones, Bion D.	2003
Southern	Jones, Frank C.	1945
Southern	Jones, James H.	1973
Southern	Jones, L. Bevel	2000
Southern	Jones, Robert H.	1993
Southern	Jones II, Stanley	2006
Southern	Jordan, Don L.	1966
Southern	Joullian II, Edward	1977
Southern	Judd, George E.	1956
Southern	Jung Jr., Arthur L.	1965
Southern	Kafoure, Louis	1983
Southern	Kapp, Robert P.	1963
Southern	Kattwinkel, O. Frank	1978
Southern	Kearns Jr., Amos	1984
Southern	Keating, Anthony	1959
Southern	Keith Jr., J. Paul	1978
Southern	Kelley, Norman	1959
Southern	Kelley, Stephen B.	1989
Southern	Kemp, Marjorie T.	1992
Southern	Kemp, William P.	1956
Southern	Kennedy, Dabney	1989
Southern	Kerr, Dr. Denton	1972
Southern	Kerr, Walter K.	1962
Southern	Ketron, William F.	1985
Southern	Kidd, Aubrey V.	1960
Southern	Kinberger, A.H.	1986
Southern	Kinsey, C.	2008
Southern	Kinsey, Everett W.	1994
Southern	Kinsey, Norman V.	1966
Southern	Kloeppel, Robert	1948
Southern	Knox, Robert E.	1968
Southern	Knox, Wyck A.	1958
Southern	Kossman Jr., S.E.	1961
Southern	Krouskop, Thomas	2007
Southern	Kuester, Hart H.	1971
Southern	Kunkel, Eugene H.	1969
Southern	Kynerd, Stanley L.	2014
Southern	LaFar Jr., D.R.	1957
Southern	LaFortune, Robert	1972
Southern	Lamb, Kelsey	1962
Southern	Lamothe Jr., I.	1976
Southern	Lander, John H.	1957
Southern	Langford, John S.	1993
Southern	Langley, E. Robert	1964
Southern	Lanier, George H.	1943
Southern	Lavery, Carl C.	1973
Southern	Lawhorn, Gerald	2004
Southern	Lawler, Beverley	1976
Southern	Lawrence, W. Dewey	1954
Southern	Laws, John S.	1973
Southern	Laycook, James B.	1999
Southern	Lea IV, John W.	2007
Southern	Legan, Pat	1990
Southern	Leonard, O.P.	1959
Southern	Leonard Jr., O.P.	1972
Southern	Lever, Chauncey W.	1979
Southern	Levingston, S.	1962
Southern	Lewis, Floyd W.	1972
Southern	Lewis, George E.	1949
Southern	Lewis, Gertrude	1995
Southern	Lewman, Harold	1971
Southern	Lightner, George	1988
Southern	Lineberry, Albert	1979
Southern	Liston, R.W.	1971
Southern	Loeble Jr., William D.	2002
Southern	Long, Erst	1956
Southern	Long, Peter J.	1987
Southern	Long, Roswell C.	1946
Southern	Long, Susan M.	2020
Southern	Long Jr., Willie J.	1974
Southern	Lord, Edward D.	1985
Southern	Lott, John F.	1985
Southern	Love, Harry W.	1964
Southern	Lovick, G.A.	1985
Southern	Lowder, Fred H.	1986
Southern	Luckett, B.E.	1970
Southern	Luckett, Helen H.	1978
Southern	Lutken, Donald C.	1979
Southern	Lutz, Ralph P.	1986
Southern	Lynch, James	2020
Southern	Lynch, John F.	1963
Southern	Lynch Jr., Lawrence J.	1985
Southern	Lynch, William W.	1962
Southern	Machek Jr., Michael	1965
Southern	MacLean, Douglas	1988
Southern	Maddox, Malcolm	2005
Southern	Mager, Albert	1954
Southern	Mahoney, Larry Gene	2016
Southern	Malone, Frank B.	1967
Southern	Manier Jr., Will R.	1999
Southern	Mansfield, L.E.	1945
Southern	Markham, Walter	1967
Southern	Marr, Ray H.	1987
Southern	Marsh, Harry Ray	1975
Southern	Martin, John H.	1948
Southern	Martin III, A.G.M.	1989
Southern	Mason, W.F.	1991
Southern	Mathias, G.D.	1998
Southern	Mathis Jr., Allen	1974
Southern	Matsumoto, Jin	1999
Southern	Maultsby, Josiah	1951
Southern	Maupin Jr., Edward	1946
Southern	Mayse, A.G. Pat	1955
Southern	McAlister, O. Hardy	1992
Southern	McCarroll, Arthur	1985
Southern	McCord, William	1977
Southern	McCulla, John	2019
Southern	McGregor, James	1973
Southern	McGugin, Sherry	2020
Southern	McGuire, Daniel	2004
Southern	McGuire III, Thomas	1976
Southern	McKelvey, T. Bruce	1985
Southern	McLean III, Arthur F. "Mac"	2002
Southern	McNair, Champney	1982
Southern	McVeigh III, Norman	2009
Southern	Melton III, Eston	1998
Southern	Mercer, Edward	1993
Southern	Metcalf Jr., William M.	2021
Southern	Metcalfe, John “Jack”	2014
Southern	Merritt, W.A.	1945
Southern	Middleton Jr., Frank	1971
Southern	Mihm, John C.	2001
Southern	Miles, James C.	2016
Southern	Miller, James R.	1966
Southern	Miller, Richards	1996
Southern	Minto, William M.	1977
Southern	Mitchell, Douglas	1996
Southern	Mitchell, Homer	1945
Southern	Mitchell, William	1959
Southern	Mobley, Ben E.	1992
Southern	Money, Anton G.	2006
Southern	Montgomery, James	1982
Southern	Moore, Samuel S.	1954
Southern	Morgan, Donald	1988
Southern	Morris Jr., William	1972
Southern	Morrison, Ed	2019
Southern	Morrison, Eleanor Smith	2005
Southern	Morrison, James	1974
Southern	Morriss Jr., Josh R.	1969
Southern	Morriss, William	2008
Southern	Mosby, Roger C.	2013
Southern	Mott Jr., Charles	1969
Southern	Moyers, Donald P.	1985
Southern	Munoz II, Alberto	2001
Southern	Murchison, John	1974
Southern	Murray, Ennis E.	1948
Southern	Murray, James C.	2002
Southern	Murray Jr., William J.	1958
Southern	Myers, Thomas D.	1995
Southern	Myers Jr., Albert G.	1963
Southern	Needham, Frank	1955
Southern	Neese, Dwight V.	2008
Southern	Neil, Charles V.	1988
Southern	Nelson, Carl R.	2002
Southern	Newton, Louie D.	1956
Southern	Nielsen, Alf R.	1947
Southern	Noble, Robert E.	1944
Southern	Noel, William W.	1962
Southern	Norman, J. Colgan	1950
Southern	Northen, Mary M.	1977
Southern	Norton, Fred R.	2016
Southern	Nowotny, Dean A.	1950
Southern	O’Dwyer, Thomas	1986
Southern	Ogle, Joseph M.	2005
Southern	O’Keefe, R. Earl	1965
Southern	Olmstead Jr., Francis	1992
Southern	Olson, Howard B.	1993
Southern	Orgill, Edmund	1948
Southern	Ory, Sidney C.	1975
Southern	Osborn III, Prime	1967
Southern	Osina, Charles K.	1978
Southern	Pace, Joe K.	2003
Southern	Palmer, E.W.	1944
Southern	Papy, Elfred S.	1949
Southern	Paret, George L.	1959
Southern	Parker, Earle N.	1967
Southern	Parsons, O.L.	1975
Southern	Paterson, A.B.	1945
Southern	Patterson, Aubrey	2010
Southern	Patterson, J.W.	1967
Southern	Patton, Paul E.	1999
Southern	Paul, Richard L.	1987
Southern	Payne, William T.	1964
Southern	Pearson, Mignonne	2001
Southern	Pecot, Sully C.	1956
Southern	Penry, Clyde A.	1945
Southern	Perez, H. Tico	2001
Southern	Perkins, Edwin R.	1966
Southern	Perot, H. Ross	1974
Southern	Perry, Gov. Rick	2002
Southern	Pfeffer, Philip M.	2009
Southern	Phelan Jr., Frank	1990
Southern	Phillips, Charles	1973
Southern	Phillips, James	1946
Southern	Phillips, John G.	1980
Southern	Phillips, Philip R.	1960
Southern	Phinney, Robert	1960
Southern	Pierce, Robert C.	1984
Southern	Piers, John S.	1975
Southern	Pirrung, Gilbert R.	1961
Southern	Pirtle, George W.	1956
Southern	Pitts, Joe W.	1974
Southern	Pitts, Oliver L.	1979
Southern	Pizzi, Jr., Joseph E.	2017
Southern	Plucker, Gail	2019
Southern	Porter, Dean	1955
Southern	Porter Jr., Gen. Robert	1968
Southern	Potter, Lester T.	1964
Southern	Potts, The Hon. Randy L.	2020
Southern	Pound, Marvin G.	1952
Southern	Powe, William A.	1978
Southern	Price, E.R.	1945
Southern	Price, Thomas H.	2010
Southern	Pridgen, M.H.	2005
Southern	Proctor, Charles	1953
Southern	Quackenbush, W.	1980
Southern	Quasha, William	1974
Southern	Rainey, William T.	1943
Southern	Rainwater, Crawford	1961
Southern	Randolph, Harvey	2000
Southern	Randolph, H.G.	1970
Southern	Rast, L. Edmund	1978
Southern	Ray Jr., Cread L.	1980
Southern	Read, John M.	1970
Southern	Reddinger, James	1995
Southern	Redman, Charels B.	1991
Southern	Reed, B.F.	1954
Southern	Reed, Jack R.	1963
Southern	Reed, R.W.	1951
Southern	Reiber, Fred E.	1977
Southern	Rhoades, James	1959
Southern	Ribar, John	1994
Southern	Richardson, Edward	1970
Southern	Richardson, H. Smith	1943
Southern	Riggs, Thomas W.	1991
Southern	Riley, Hugh H.	2000
Southern	Robbins, Eric P.	1959
Southern	Roberts, David D.	2007
Southern	Roberts, Thomas L.	2015
Southern	Roberts, Warren A.	1972
Southern	Robertson, Carl	1996
Southern	Robinson, Reuben	1965
Southern	Rogers III, C.M.A.	1981
Southern	Romaine, Ian M.	2021
Southern	Rose, David J.	1948
Southern	Rose, Mark	2015
Southern	Routh, Ross H.	1970
Southern	Royer, Robert L.	1990
Southern	Ruder, Lucius S.	1956
Southern	Rumbarger Jr., David P.	2013
Southern	Rummel, Joseph	1946
Southern	Russell, Daniel	1954
Southern	Russell Jr., Richard	2001
Southern	Saltz, J.E.	1962
Southern	Sampson, W.E.	1948
Southern	Sandberg, W.H.	1958
Southern	Sanders, George	1968
Southern	Sanders, Robert	1984
Southern	Sandlin, Joseph	1979
Southern	Sandridge, Sidney	1990
Southern	Sapp Jr., N.W.	1993
Southern	Sasser, Donald J.	1983
Southern	Saunders, Barbara	2005
Southern	Saunders, C. Bari	1990
Southern	Sayre, Charles R.	1963
Southern	Schenck, Paul W.	1943
Southern	Schley, Philip T.	1999
Southern	Schmidt, Robert	1973
Southern	Schneider, Irwin	1972
Southern	Scott, Don B.	1994
Southern	Sexton, Michael R.	2018
Southern	Shackouls, Bobby	2002
Southern	Shaffer, Bill	2005
Southern	Sharp, W.L.	1948
Southern	Shelby, Thomas H.	1951
Southern	Shelton, William	1975
Southern	Shepherd, James	1987
Southern	Shepherd, Joshua	1944
Southern	Sherill, J.H.	1945
Southern	Shivers, Allen	1953
Southern	Shouse, Jane	1984
Southern	Shows, David A.	2000
Southern	Shuman, A.L.	1948
Southern	Sikes, T. Edgar	1981
Southern	Simons, D.W.	1987
Southern	Sleik, Jonathan	1994
Southern	Sloan, O. Temple	2009
Southern	Smart, Russell H.	2004
Southern	Smith, Angela	2018
Southern	Smith, Barry A.	2010
Southern	Smith, Clifford F.	1975
Southern	Smith, Evelyn T.	1991
Southern	Smith, George W.	1958
Southern	Smith, Harry M.	1961
Southern	Smith, Lawrence	2006
Southern	Smith, Marvin L.	1987
Southern	Smith, Robert	1986
Southern	Smith Jr., Clifford	1975
Southern	Smith Jr., Hobart	1991
Southern	Smoot, W. Clay	1955
Southern	Smythe, M.A.	1949
Southern	Sorrels, William Scott	2000
Southern	Spangenberg Jr., Theodore S.	2006
Southern	Sparks Jr., Herbert H.	1986
Southern	Spencer, William	1975
Southern	Spence, William T.	2015
Southern	Spires, Timothy L.	2017
Southern	Squire, William B.	2016
Southern	Squyres, Arthur	1972
Southern	Stacey, Truman	1979
Southern	Stafford, Ivan B.	1986
Southern	Stahlman Jr., E.B.	1960
Southern	Stanford, James E.	2002
Southern	Stanford Jr., R.D.	1971
Southern	Staton, John C.	1963
Southern	Stein, Luther R.	1944
Southern	Stembler, John H.	1969
Southern	Stephens, Charles E.	1998
Southern	Stephens, W.G.	1983
Southern	Stevens, Ben M.	1962
Southern	Stevens Jr., James	1968
Southern	Stewart, Judge Carl E.	2002
Southern	Stewart, H. Milton	1997
Southern	Stone, Herbert	1958
Southern	Stoner, Glenn C.	2020
Southern	Stowe, Dan C.	1982
Southern	Strachan, Harry G.	1948
Southern	Street, Allen	1952
Southern	Street Jr., Malcolm	2007
Southern	Strickland, Thomas	1979
Southern	Struby, Bert	1982
Southern	Stuart III, John	2010
Southern	Stumbo, John E.	1997
Southern	Sullivan, Charles	1978
Southern	Sutton, Willis A.	1943
Southern	Swander, Claude	1951
Southern	Swift, Herman H.	1981
Southern	Swift, Lamar	1966
Southern	Swift, William D.	1970
Southern	Swisher, George	1987
Southern	Talley IV, William H.	2014
Southern	Tate Jr., Alvan	1972
Southern	Tatham, Thomas	1971
Southern	Tatum, David S.	2004
Southern	Taylor, George B.	1980
Southern	Teer Jr., Nello L.	1969
Southern	Tellepsen, Howard	1956
Southern	Terry, Robert F. "Bo"	2018
Southern	Thacker, William	1985
Southern	Thayer, Paul	1978
Southern	Thayer Jr., E.T.	1962
Southern	Therivel, Brigitte	2005
Southern	Thom, Donald C.	2014
Southern	Thomas, Judge Daniel Holcombe	1975
Southern	Thomas Jr., John W.	1982
Southern	Thompson, Michael L.	2009
Southern	Thompson, Oscar	1985
Southern	Topmiller, Charles	1975
Southern	Trawick, Judy L.	1988
Southern	Traylor Jr., C.T.	1983
Southern	Treadway, Chuck	2010
Southern	Trefz, Bruce R.	2005
Southern	Trentman, W.H.	1965
Southern	Tucker, K. Gregory	2001
Southern	Turner, George C.	1967
Southern	Turner, Herman L.	1943
Southern	Turner, John B.	1955
Southern	Turner Jr., Joseph	2001
Southern	Tuttle, W.B.	1945
Southern	Uffman, Kenneth	1996
Southern	Uhrich, Andrew R. "Rich"	2018
Southern	Van Horn, Keith	1989
Southern	Vaughn, Billy J.	2003
Southern	Von Almen, William	1997
Southern	Wade, George K.	1986
Southern	Waggoner Jr., T.J.	1968
Southern	Waite, Mary G.J.	1986
Southern	Walcutt, Bruce D.	2001
Southern	Waldrep Jr., George	2002
Southern	Walker, Laurence	1984
Southern	Walker, Matthew M.	1996
Southern	Walker, Morgan	1955
Southern	Wall, C.C.	1956
Southern	Wallace, Rusty	2005
Southern	Wallenborn, Peter A.	1967
Southern	Walley, Billy W.	1994
Southern	Walters, Walter	1963
Southern	Walton Jr., R.O.	1990
Southern	Warlick, Larry E.	1985
Southern	Warlick III, John	2007
Southern	Warner, H.D.	1948
Southern	Watkins, Rick	2007
Southern	Watson, Penn T.	1953
Southern	Watzek, Peter F.	1952
Southern	Weaver, R. Fleming	1980
Southern	Weaver, Ray L.	1980
Southern	Webb, Lawrence	1951
Southern	Weber, Charles	1952
Southern	Weekley, David	2011
Southern	Weikel, Randy J.	1998
Southern	Welch, Carl F.	1955
Southern	Wendell, Don	2014
Southern	Wendland, Thomas	1989
Southern	West, W. Jack	1975
Southern	Wethersby, Lawrence	1955
Southern	Wharton, V.L.	1953
Southern	Whibbs, Vince	1969
Southern	Whitacre, Walter	1986
Southern	Whitaker, Noris D.	1992
Southern	White, Byron L.	1991
Southern	White, Michael F.	2021
Southern	White, Robert T.	1990
Southern	White, W.R.	1957
Southern	Whittaker, C.G.	1980
Southern	Williams, C.E.	1948
Southern	Williams, John A.	1982
Southern	Williams, L. Kemper	1944
Southern	Williams, Len	2008
Southern	Williams, Louis J.	1963
Southern	Williams, Peggy	1984
Southern	Williamson, Mark B.	2021
Southern	Willig, Billy W.	1988
Southern	Wilson, Delmer H.	1978
Southern	Wilson III, Frank	1985
Southern	Wise, Kathy M.	2000
Southern	Wolbach, Charles	1994
Southern	Wolfe, Bobbie L.	1984
Southern	Wolff, W.W.	1957
Southern	Wood, Clyde H.	1988
Southern	Wood, Frank D.	1943
Southern	Wood III, John E.	1982
Southern	Woods, Michael	1996
Southern	Worden, Charles	1969
Southern	Worley, Bland W.	1971
Southern	Wrenn, Janice	2004
Southern	Wright Jr., John	1969
Southern	Wynne Jr., Angus	1967
Southern	Yarboro, Thomas Richard	2013
Southern	Young, James M.	1989
Southern	Young, John A.	2009
Southern	Young, Mitchell	1994
Southern	Zaccara, Daniel S.	1999
Southern	Zachow, Dr. Steven	2019
Southern	Zieburtz, William	1987
Southern	Zink, John S.	1993
Northeast	Abrahamson, Michael	2020
Northeast	Achey, Glenn R.	2006
Northeast	Adams, Charles S.	1946
Northeast	Adams, George C.	1963
Northeast	Adams, Lynn G.	1946
Northeast	Addinsell, Harry M.	1948
Northeast	Adolphi, Ronald L.	2014
Northeast	Adriance, Frederick W.	2017
Northeast	Aiello, Frank D.	1985
Northeast	Albert, Daniel J.	2015
Northeast	Alderman, Arnold J.	1987
Northeast	Allen Jr., Albert L.	1966
Northeast	Allsop, Thomas	1968
Northeast	Alston, Carl B.	1976
Northeast	Amitrano, George J.	1987
Northeast	Anderson, Scott T.	2012
Northeast	Andrews, E.F.	1976
Northeast	Andrus, Cowles	1951
Northeast	Appler, Raymond R.	2000
Northeast	Arkans, Marvin	1988
Northeast	Arkwright, George A.	1958
Northeast	Armstrong, Scott	2019
Northeast	Arnesen, Sigurd J.	1947
Northeast	Asbury, Edward G.	1981
Northeast	Ashe, Warren K.	1992
Northeast	Aspinwall, Fred J.	1990
Northeast	August, Burton S.	1969
Northeast	August, Charles J.	1987
Northeast	Ayala, Hernan	1978
Northeast	Bacon, Archpriest John T.	2013
Northeast	Bain, Thomas S.	2005
Northeast	Bain, Patricia Y.	2019
Northeast	Baker, A. Morse	1964
Northeast	Baker, Linda L.	2005
Northeast	Baldree, Charles J.	1979
Northeast	Banghart, Harold L.	1956
Northeast	Barbieri, James R.	2006
Northeast	Barlow, Jason B.	2013
Northeast	Barnes, Bray Bruce	1998
Northeast	Barnes, Robert	2007
Northeast	Barney, Howard V.	1959
Northeast	Barr, Howard B.	1971
Northeast	Barr, Leonard C.	1960
Northeast	Barrett, Harold S.	1970
Northeast	Barth, A. Theodore	1983
Northeast	Bartholomew Jr., A.	1977
Northeast	Bartsch, Paul	1947
Northeast	Bast, Roger G.	1998
Northeast	Bates, William C.	1951
Northeast	Bausher, Jr., Richard M.	2017
Northeast	Beach, J. Watson	1967
Northeast	Beal, Gerald F.	1949
Northeast	Beal, Orville E.	1963
Northeast	Bearce, George D.	1946
Northeast	Beaver, Thomas A.	1995
Northeast	Bedingfield, Robert	2000
Northeast	Bell, Daniel W.	1954
Northeast	Benjamin, George L.	1991
Northeast	Bennett, Brian E.	1999
Northeast	Bennett, Donald V.	1970
Northeast	Bensen, James Q.	1969
Northeast	Berg Jr., R. Clifford	2013
Northeast	Berggren, Bernard	1965
Northeast	Berger, Scott R.	2016
Northeast	Bernstein, Israel	1945
Northeast	Berryman, Macon	1972
Northeast	Besch, Nancy A.	2001
Northeast	Bess, Dr. Thomas	1953
Northeast	Bierer, James H.	1978
Northeast	Bierer, John M.	1944
Northeast	Billett, J. Fred	1985
Northeast	Binns, Arthur W.	1951
Northeast	Bird, Charles Summer	1948
Northeast	Black, Robert C.	2018
Northeast	Blair, Earl O.	2008
Northeast	Blaisdell, Paul H.	1965
Northeast	Blake, Alvin J.	1980
Northeast	Blanc, Albert H.	1971
Northeast	Blauser Jr., Stanley	1977
Northeast	Blewett, Edward Y.	1956
Northeast	Block, A.J.	2008
Northeast	Blondin, Arthur A.	1947
Northeast	Blose, Laurence H.	1958
Northeast	Boesch, Gina M.	2007
Northeast	Bohling, Wilfred C.	1967
Northeast	Bone, Arthur E.	1978
Northeast	Bookstaber, Philip	1949
Northeast	Boulukos, George N.	1994
Northeast	Bowker, C. Grant	1949
Northeast	Boyden Jr., Laurance	1975
Northeast	Boyle, Gerard J.	2017
Northeast	Bradley Jr., John S.	1977
Northeast	Branch, Albert G.	1984
Northeast	Braxton, John L.	2008
Northeast	Brereton, Donald S.	1971
Northeast	Brewster, Hon. Owen	1957
Northeast	Brod, Irven J.	1972
Northeast	Brooks Jr., Clarence	1967
Northeast	Brown, George H.	1969
Northeast	Brown, J. Thompson	1946
Northeast	Brown, Revelle W.	1956
Northeast	Brown, Rev. Robert	1946
Northeast	Bryant, Marshall G.	1984
Northeast	Bryce, Henry W.	1968
Northeast	Buck, Carson P.	1969
Northeast	Budlong, Wilford	1958
Northeast	Bueso, Francisco	1955
Northeast	Buote, Walter L.	1976
Northeast	Burke, Arleigh A.	1964
Northeast	Burns, John J.	1963
Northeast	Burton, Ronald E.	1984
Northeast	Burton, Thomas M.	1954
Northeast	Busby, Jack K.	1962
Northeast	Buss, Howard	1972
Northeast	Butler III, Harriss	1997
Northeast	Butler, Thomas C.	1974
Northeast	Byron, Joseph W.	1948
Northeast	Cahill, Albert E.	1980
Northeast	Callow, Russell S.	1955
Northeast	Campbell Jr., Thomas	1989
Northeast	Canham, Erwin D.	1966
Northeast	Carbeau, Charles W.	1957
Northeast	Carling, Philip C.	1973
Northeast	Carnahan, David H.	1977
Northeast	Carnahan, USN, RAdm. Ralph H.	1983
Northeast	Carparelli, Peter J.	1973
Northeast	Carr, Clarence J.	1962
Northeast	Carr, J. David	1990
Northeast	Carr, Joseph W.	1984
Northeast	Cartoun, Alan R.	1974
Northeast	Case, Chester H.	1960
Northeast	Case Jr., Frederic	1951
Northeast	Case, Gerard G.	2014
Northeast	Case, Joe Paul	2017
Northeast	Casey, Peter P.	1994
Northeast	Cass, William F.	2008
Northeast	Castanzo, James	2013
Northeast	Chambers, John R.	2002
Northeast	Chance, Keron D.	1970
Northeast	Chesterman, Francis	1947
Northeast	Chilutti, Mark J.	2008
Northeast	Choquette Jr., Paul	1999
Northeast	Christensen, Scott R.	2013
Northeast	Ciampo, Salvatore	2018
Northeast	Cianchette, Alton E.	1982
Northeast	Ciccio, Samuel S.	1990
Northeast	Citta, Joseph A.	1987
Northeast	Clark, Charles M.	2009
Northeast	Clark, Donald N.	1966
Northeast	Clark, Keith A.	1999
Northeast	Claxton, Rev. Allen	1950
Northeast	Clayton, Hugh C.	1975
Northeast	Clime, Henry S.	1974
Northeast	Cline, Randall K.	2003
Northeast	Coffin, C.W.	1960
Northeast	Cole, Murray L.	1971
Northeast	Cole, Norman B.	1959
Northeast	Coleman, W.C.	1950
Northeast	Collins, Nicholas H.	1993
Northeast	Colvin, Willard E.	1968
Northeast	Comley, Arthur M.	1944
Northeast	Connare, William G.	1966
Northeast	Connolly, Eugene T.	1958
Northeast	Conway, Hon. Albert	1945
Northeast	Cooke, Terence C.	1981
Northeast	Cool, Edward C.	2010
Northeast	Cooper, David W.	1991
Northeast	Cordaro, Thomas J.	2012
Northeast	Corey, Samuel C.	1985
Northeast	Cort, Stewart S.	1974
Northeast	Costa, John J.	1975
Northeast	Cotting, Charles E.	1969
Northeast	Coughlin, John M.	1974
Northeast	Cousens II, Lyman A.	1998
Northeast	Cowan, John A.	1960
Northeast	Craft, A. Burr	1982
Northeast	Crawford, Calvin D.	1950
Northeast	Crawford, James	2007
Northeast	Creighton Jr., Garretson	1978
Northeast	Creitz, Walter M.	1979
Northeast	Csatari, Joseph	2003
Northeast	Cullimore, Allan R.	1947
Northeast	Curtis, Walter W.	1967
Northeast	Curtiss, William H.	1945
Northeast	Cushing, Peter J.	1982
Northeast	D'Alessandro, Hugo	1954
Northeast	Damon, Stuart B.	1959
Northeast	Danaher, Dorothy M.	1986
Northeast	Danaher, Francis R.	1955
Northeast	Daniel, R. Michael	2002
Northeast	Dauost, Donald R.	1992
Northeast	Davidow, Joshua V.	1975
Northeast	Davies, Joseph A.	1979
Northeast	Davis, Bert H.	1953
Northeast	Davis, Delores D.	1985
Northeast	Davis, Kenneth P.	1980
Northeast	Davis, Leslie N.	1966
Northeast	Davis, Norman A.	1947
Northeast	Davison, Earl	2000
Northeast	Dealaman, Robert G.	1992
Northeast	DeButts, John D.	1971
Northeast	Deering, Joseph G.	1950
Northeast	DeMark, Eugene F.	2000
Northeast	Dempsey, Hon. John	1973
Northeast	Denny, Jr., Harmar D.	1944
Northeast	Dent, Henry H.	1970
Northeast	Desmond, Thomas	1947
Northeast	Detwiler, John G.	1958
Northeast	DeVore, Russell B.	2018
Northeast	Dewey, Hon. Thomas	1950
Northeast	DeWick, Steven R.	2011
Northeast	DiBiagio, Robert	2021
Northeast	Dibble, Claire A.	1996
Northeast	Dick, Arthur H.	1958
Northeast	Dilkes, Russell C.	1996
Northeast	DiSalvo, Anthony L.	1978
Northeast	Ditelberg, Dennis L.	1998
Northeast	Dittrick, Douglas H.	2004
Northeast	Doherty, Rev. John	1986
Northeast	Doherty, Thomas A.	1993
Northeast	Doherty, William A.	1968
Northeast	Dolan, Richard D.	1980
Northeast	Donais, Craig Stephen	2016
Northeast	Dorr, Dudley H.	1944
Northeast	Dorr, Richard G.	1970
Northeast	Dowd, George M.	1948
Northeast	Dowling, Robert M.	1955
Northeast	Downey, Marjorie L.	1989
Northeast	Downey Jr., Robert	1989
Northeast	Downey III, William	1999
Northeast	Dressler, Warren	2012
Northeast	Driscoll, Hon. Alfred	1950
Northeast	Drivas, Louis T.	1962
Northeast	Dubois, Jacques E.	1979
Northeast	Duff, Sen. James H.	1951
Northeast	DuPont, Bidermann	1968
Northeast	Dussing Jr., Donald	2009
Northeast	Dyer, Thomas H.	1975
Northeast	Dziadoaz, Douglas H.	2004
Northeast	Eastman, Edward R.	1944
Northeast	Eaton, Harold A.	1951
Northeast	Ecclesine, George A.	1959
Northeast	Eckert, William H.	1946
Northeast	Edleberg, Samuel	1954
Northeast	Edmonds Jr. USAF, Col. Edmund W.	1983
Northeast	Ehre, Victor T.	1969
Northeast	Eichler, George A.	1953
Northeast	Eichorn, Alvin A.	2009
Northeast	Einstein, Samuel	1968
Northeast	Eisenhart, Herbert M.	1944
Northeast	Eisner, Stanley J.	1949
Northeast	Elliott, Merle S.	1976
Northeast	Ellison, Donald Earl	2005
Northeast	Ely, Atwood C.	1971
Northeast	Ertel, John P.	2005
Northeast	Eshenaur, Woodrow	1974
Northeast	Evans, John D.	1967
Northeast	Evans, William C.	1993
Northeast	Ewing, Andrew R.	1961
Northeast	Eynon, Howard B.	1959
Northeast	Faber Jr., Fred S.	1982
Northeast	Fanelli Jr., Joseph	2011
Northeast	Farnum, Jonathan K.	1997
Northeast	Farr, Julia Mae-Shen	2018
Northeast	Fawcett, William W.M.	1944
Northeast	Feist, Irving	1953
Northeast	Felczak, John S.	1959
Northeast	Feril, Benjamin	2021
Northeast	Ferguson, Charles H.	1999
Northeast	Fernandes, Joseph E.	1977
Northeast	Filbey, Robert W.	1981
Northeast	Finkelstein, Sidney A.	1962
Northeast	Finney Jr., J.M.T.	1948
Northeast	Finucane, B. Emmett	1949
Northeast	Firestone, Roger S.	1958
Northeast	Fischer, John H.	1960
Northeast	Fisk, Bryan R.	2015
Northeast	Fitts, William C.	1945
Northeast	Fleming, D. Malcolm	1961
Northeast	Flinn, Ralph E.	1947
Northeast	Flipse, Robert J.	1982
Northeast	Fluegelman, Milton	1957
Northeast	Foelber, Charles H.	1984
Northeast	Foran, James F.	1980
Northeast	Ford, L. Stanley	1948
Northeast	Ford, Thomas E.	1993
Northeast	Foster, William F.	1944
Northeast	Foust, Wilson A.	1960
Northeast	Fowler, Howard N.	1960
Northeast	Froessel, Charles W.	1944
Northeast	Fullman, Douglas C.	2016
Northeast	Funk, G. Keith	1978
Northeast	Gadsen, Vertella S.	1984
Northeast	Galasso, Barbara T.	1982
Northeast	Gamble Jr., Theodore	1995
Northeast	Ganley, James P.	2017
Northeast	Gannon, Rev. Robert	1950
Northeast	Garber, Murray H.	1970
Northeast	Garshick, Alfred	1989
Northeast	Gates, Frank H.	1945
Northeast	Gautieri Sr., Vito J.	2009
Northeast	Gavin, Austin	1971
Northeast	Gay, Leon S.	1944
Northeast	Geiger, Gerald M.	1996
Northeast	Geismar, Sylvan	1957
Northeast	Gerlach, Harry K.	1980
Northeast	Gershowitz, Howard	2002
Northeast	Gibson, John M.	1975
Northeast	Gibson, Julian M.	1962
Northeast	Gifford, W. Pitt	1948
Northeast	Gilbane, Thomas F.	1972
Northeast	Gilbane, William J.	1965
Northeast	Gilchriest, Robert K.	1997
Northeast	Gilchrist Jr., Thomas	1972
Northeast	Gingras, David A.	1988
Northeast	Ginsberg, Norman	1995
Northeast	Girton, Paul K.	1953
Northeast	Gleasner, George W.	1951
Northeast	Glockner, A. John	2000
Northeast	Godfrey, Richard C.	1964
Northeast	Goes, Clifford	1952
Northeast	Goldsmith, Jeffrey H.	2011
Northeast	Gomez, Wilfredo	1970
Northeast	Goodman, E. Urner	1963
Northeast	Gore, Harold M.	1948
Northeast	Gore, Philip Larner	1965
Northeast	Gott, Edwin H.	1968
Northeast	Graham, Robert W.	1966
Northeast	Graves, Earl G.	1986
Northeast	Gray, David E.	1946
Northeast	Gray, Harold T.	1965
Northeast	Greco, Thomas J.	2000
Northeast	Green, David C.	2002
Northeast	Greey Jr., Elmer B.	1997
Northeast	Groce Jr., Herbert	1975
Northeast	Grogg, William R.	1993
Northeast	Grossman, John	1967
Northeast	Gruen, Edward C.	1962
Northeast	Guglielmone, Robert	2004
Northeast	Hafer, Paul R.	1963
Northeast	Hagan, Charles M.	1962
Northeast	Hahn Jr., Frank E.	1980
Northeast	Haines, Mahlon N.	1944
Northeast	Haklisch, Paul R.	2001
Northeast	Halberg, Elmer J.	1952
Northeast	Halkyard, John R.	1958
Northeast	Hall, Ivan H.	1977
Northeast	Hall, Lyle G.	1944
Northeast	Halladay, Allan W.	1969
Northeast	Halley, Ernest G.	1958
Northeast	Halsey, John R.	2013
Northeast	Hammond, Carleton	1973
Northeast	Hammond, Donald	1962
Northeast	Hampton, Wayne A.	2007
Northeast	Hansen, Henry R.	1994
Northeast	Harper, John D.	1973
Northeast	Harris, Benjamin L.	1987
Northeast	Harris, Vivian	1984
Northeast	Haskel, Saul H.	1986
Northeast	Hathaway, Ronald	2002
Northeast	Hatch, Francis W.	1944
Northeast	Hauck, Charles F.	1980
Northeast	Hawkes, Franklin P.	1953
Northeast	Hay, Henry H.	1946
Northeast	Healey Jr., Charles	1966
Northeast	Healy, James B.	1993
Northeast	Healey, Jr., Lawrence A.	2016
Northeast	Healy, Michael P.	1997
Northeast	Hensen, Frances A.	2011
Northeast	Hershey, Dr. John O.	1979
Northeast	Hershey, L. Vinton	1946
Northeast	Hershey, Gen. Lewis B.	1963
Northeast	Hesketh, E. John	1970
Northeast	Hickey, Augustine	1947
Northeast	Hill, M.D., George	1998
Northeast	Hillenbrand, Frederick “Rick”	2014
Northeast	Hiller, William A.	1986
Northeast	Hipius, Joseph C.	1988
Northeast	Hirsch, Arthur Z.	1956
Northeast	Hoffman, George T.	1986
Northeast	Holcomb, H. Sherman	1965
Northeast	Holden, Russell A.	1980
Northeast	Holl, Sen. Edwin G.	1991
Northeast	Holmes, Michelle	2019
Northeast	Honaman, R. Karl	1972
Northeast	Honens, Lawrie W.	1992
Northeast	Hooker, R. Wolcott	1957
Northeast	Hoover, David C.	1961
Northeast	Horn, John C.	1967
Northeast	Horn, Solveig Wald	1976
Northeast	Horning, Roderick H.	1979
Northeast	Horton, Frank R.	1959
Northeast	Hoskins, Robert H.	1968
Northeast	Hosterman, Sumner	1946
Northeast	Houghton, Amory	1944
Northeast	Hovey, Gordon E.	1956
Northeast	Howard, Frederick	1958
Northeast	Hoyt, James L.	1949
Northeast	Hummel, Donald	1993
Northeast	Hunsaker, J. Russell	2006
Northeast	Hunter, J. Marshall	1962
Northeast	Hurd, Raymond W.	1969
Northeast	Hutchinson, Charles	1964
Northeast	Hyman, Peter E.	2001
Northeast	Iannotti, Lawrence	1985
Northeast	Illick, Dr. Joseph S.	1951
Northeast	Ingraham, Dudley S.	1962
Northeast	Isenberg, Jack W.	1995
Northeast	Jackson, William R.	1964
Northeast	Jaikut, Richard A.	1993
Northeast	James, William R.	2002
Northeast	Jansen, Dr. William	1947
Northeast	Jewett, John P.	1992
Northeast	Johnson, Bruce C.	1990
Northeast	Johnson, Cortland	1950
Northeast	Johnson, David	2003
Northeast	Johnson, Robert B.	1988
Northeast	Johnson, Judith C.	1998
Northeast	Johnston, Gale	1946
Northeast	Johnston, William	2010
Northeast	Johnston Jr., William	1947
Northeast	Jones Jr., Alfred C.	1987
Northeast	Joost Jr., Fred W.	2012
Northeast	Joseponis, Anthony	1983
Northeast	Judd, Robert S.	1946
Northeast	Kavanaugh Jr., William	2007
Northeast	Keegan, Arthur W.	1994
Northeast	Keeler, William H.	2002
Northeast	Kehoe, Thomas P.	2014
Northeast	Kelley, Daniel J.	1948
Northeast	Kelley, Lawrence E.	1980
Northeast	Kelly, Michael J.	1990
Northeast	Kendall, Donald M.	1971
Northeast	Kennedy, F. Brittain	1950
Northeast	Kennedy, Dr. Gerard	1979
Northeast	Kenney, Thomas V.	1964
Northeast	Kenny, William K.	1987
Northeast	Kernan Jr., Robert	2007
Northeast	Kerney Jr., James	1949
Northeast	Kiefer, Richard W.	1973
Northeast	Kihlberg, Darlene	2021
Northeast	King, Kenneth D.	1997
Northeast	Kinney, Howard J.	1960
Northeast	Kinney, William M.	2003
Northeast	Kirk, William	1948
Northeast	Klein, David H.	2009
Northeast	Klein Jr., Daniel E.	1996
Northeast	Kleinert, Robert W.	1981
Northeast	Kline, Hugh L.	1978
Northeast	Knowles, Francis	1958
Northeast	Koch, Robert M.	2017
Northeast	Koehler, Oscar E.	1947
Northeast	Kovacs, Louis J.	1971
Northeast	Kramer, Paul R.	2003
Northeast	Kreimer, A.J.	2008
Northeast	Kriebel, Mark A.	2003
Northeast	Krol, John Cardinal	1979
Northeast	Krumenacker III, Norman	2008
Northeast	Kurzman, Robert G.	1983
Northeast	L'Abbe, Michael	2020
Northeast	Ladd, W. Donald	1992
Northeast	Landi, Arthur E.	2008
Northeast	Lane, Hon. Arthur	1961
Northeast	Lane, Carleton G.	1965
Northeast	Lang, Rev. James E.	2001
Northeast	Lapan Jr., Richard L.	2005
Northeast	Lapham, Hon. N.D.	1952
Northeast	Larney Jr., John P.	1999
Northeast	LaRocque, Rev. Richard Paul	1981
Northeast	Larsen, John W.	1970
Northeast	Latham, William H.	1966
Northeast	Lawrence, A. Lionel	1965
Northeast	LeBlanc, Leo A.	2008
Northeast	LeCompte, Abelardo	2011
Northeast	Leech, George L.	1948
Northeast	Leffler, Ross L.	1944
Northeast	Leiman, Sol	1981
Northeast	Leisure, Shirley H.	1988
Northeast	Lenrow, Jay L.	2007
Northeast	Leonard, J. Joseph	1955
Northeast	Lev, Rabbi Aryeh	1961
Northeast	Lewis, Jr., Andrew	1992
Northeast	Lewis, G. Edward	1998
Northeast	Lewis, Garry	2021
Northeast	Lewis, Rupert R.	1954
Northeast	Liebmann, Howard	2010
Northeast	Ligertwood, Richard	1999
Northeast	Lime, Daniel A.	2004
Northeast	Lippitt, David	2020
Northeast	List, Leonardo J.	1949
Northeast	Littlewood, Douglas	1978
Northeast	Livingston Jr., Walter	1973
Northeast	Lockard Jr., Bernard W.	2014
Northeast	Lonsberry, Victor L.	2004
Northeast	Lonsdale Jr., Clarence	1981
Northeast	Loutzenheiser Jr., Edwin	1985
Northeast	Lownes, Albert E.	1947
Northeast	Lowy, Walter	1966
Northeast	Lupton, Elmer C.	1983
Northeast	Lusk, Thomas	2020
Northeast	MacAvoy, Thomas C.	1976
Northeast	Mack, James S.	1964
Northeast	MacMurray, Orrin B.	2017
Northeast	Maguire, Sonia S.	1978
Northeast	Mahler, Harry B.	1991
Northeast	Manchee, Arthur L.	1966
Northeast	Manning, Arthur	1976
Northeast	Marano, Rocco J.	1981
Northeast	Marchetti, Carl	1971
Northeast	Mason, John B.	1999
Northeast	Mason, Richard	2021
Northeast	Mazur, A. Lincoln	1973
Northeast	Mazzucca, Michael	1991
Northeast	McAllister, Francis R.	2001
Northeast	McAuliff, Brian	2014
Northeast	McBride, Thomas G.	1994
Northeast	McCabe, Charles B.	1948
Northeast	McCall, Marybeth K.	2015
Northeast	McCarthy, Justin D.	2003
Northeast	McCollister, John Y.	1973
Northeast	McCreary, Ralph W.	1951
Northeast	McCullough, Samuel	1991
Northeast	McDonald, David J.	1997
Northeast	McDonald, Khlar E.	1977
Northeast	McGarvey, Ray L.	1994
Northeast	McGee, Richard R.	1960
Northeast	McGillicuddy, John	2004
Northeast	McGuire, John L.	2006
Northeast	McKeever Jr., Thomas J.	2015
Northeast	McKibben, Glenn	1972
Northeast	McKinney, Jeffrey L.	2016
Northeast	McMillen, Wheeler	1944
Northeast	McNally, Joseph P.	2010
Northeast	McNulty, DD, Rev. James	1955
Northeast	Meadsay, Jr., Walter	1955
Northeast	Meissner Jr., Frederick	1985
Northeast	Melchior, William T.	1947
Northeast	Mengle, Glenn A.	1955
Northeast	Melville, Ward	1970
Northeast	Melvin, Crandall	1946
Northeast	Meyer, Frederick J.	2000
Northeast	Migliorini, Louis B.	1966
Northeast	Miller, Andrew James	2014
Northeast	Miller Jr., Marlin	1982
Northeast	Millward, Carl L.	1946
Northeast	Moffatt, Alex W.	1944
Northeast	Molin, Kerry R.	2001
Northeast	Molinelli, Maris	2010
Northeast	Monto, Robert C.	1998
Northeast	Moon, Christopher J.	2012
Northeast	Mooney, Gregory L.	1961
Northeast	Mooney, Samuel A.	1959
Northeast	Moore, Hon. A.H.	1946
Northeast	Morey Sr., Joseph	1951
Northeast	Morgan, III, Charles A.	2017
Northeast	Morgan, James G.	1952
Northeast	Mudge, Sterling W.	1955
Northeast	Murrill, Randall T.	1983
Northeast	Myler, James W.	1981
Northeast	Nally, Ann	1975
Northeast	Nassau, Louis E.	1966
Northeast	Nave, Henry J.	1975
Northeast	Neil Sr., Herbert E.	1958
Northeast	Neisner, Melvin B.	1974
Northeast	Nelson, Evert F.	1976
Northeast	Nelson, H. Lloyd	1949
Northeast	Nemitz, Sanford C.	2005
Northeast	Nesbitt, Albert J.	1969
Northeast	Netherton, H. Elliott	1998
Northeast	Neubauer, Russell H.	2016
Northeast	Niemann, William H.	1982
Northeast	Niskey, Jay P.	1996
Northeast	Noble, John W.	1960
Northeast	Nonemaker, Leon L.	1983
Northeast	Norcross, Earl M.	1953
Northeast	North, David A.	1966
Northeast	Norton, Paul A.	1973
Northeast	Obermeyer, Jack A.	1956
Northeast	O’Connell, Kenneth	1974
Northeast	Ohrbach, Nathan M.	1948
Northeast	O'Leary, David	2020
Northeast	O’Neil, Timothy E.	1946
Northeast	Oros, John J.	1997
Northeast	Oscarson, D. Craig	2002
Northeast	Owsley, Thomas L.	2006
Northeast	Page, Nelson L.	1959
Northeast	Palmer, Michael J.	2006
Northeast	Palmer Jr., James W.	2001
Northeast	Pape, Peter E.	2014
Northeast	Park, D. Ray	1970
Northeast	Parker, Augustine H.	1969
Northeast	Partridge, Sanborn	1970
Northeast	Paterno, Joe	1983
Northeast	Paul, Robert A.	1989
Northeast	Peckham, Henry	1945
Northeast	Pedone, Frank J.	1992
Northeast	Perregaux, Paul A.	1988
Northeast	Perrone, Steven	2021
Northeast	Perry, Eugene R.	1967
Northeast	Perry, Peter B.	2005
Northeast	Peterson, Chester H.	1963
Northeast	Peterson, Embert	1964
Northeast	Pew, J. Howard	1949
Northeast	Pfeil, John M.	1948
Northeast	Pfundt, William N.	2018
Northeast	Pinkham, Daniel R.	1949
Northeast	Placy, Greg E.	2012
Northeast	Plaut, Walter N.	1976
Northeast	Poindexter, Christian	2003
Northeast	Pomeroy, Howard	1945
Northeast	Poole, William	1957
Northeast	Porter, Harold M.	1962
Northeast	Ports, Horace G.	1963
Northeast	Pouch, William H.	1944
Northeast	Pound, Charles E.	1974
Northeast	Powers, Phillip H.	1952
Northeast	Prelle, F. Wallace	1964
Northeast	Procknow, Donald E.	1980
Northeast	Proctor, Arthur W.	1960
Northeast	Pyfer Jr., John F.	1999
Northeast	Quigley Jr., John J.	1986
Northeast	Rabold, Frank C.	1978
Northeast	Ramsay, Dwight M.	1959
Northeast	Rapp, Franklin W.	1997
Northeast	Ray Jr., Frederick	1982
Northeast	Read, Everett P.	1948
Northeast	Redd, Hugh	2016
Northeast	Reddin, Thomas E.	1989
Northeast	Reiche, Karl A.	1949
Northeast	Reiner, Charles A.	1996
Northeast	Reitz, Lawrence E.	1996
Northeast	Reynolds, A. Lionel	1966
Northeast	Reynolds, James R.	1968
Northeast	Richards, R. Wayne	1961
Northeast	Richardson, Luther L.	1953
Northeast	Ridenour, Gordon M.	1953
Northeast	Riffle, Jack B.	1979
Northeast	Riggins Jr., Loren S.	1981
Northeast	Rissmiller, Alan	2020
Northeast	Robb, William F.	1962
Northeast	Robbins, Alfred S.	1994
Northeast	Roberts, Owen J.	1944
Northeast	Robinson Jr., Elliott	1982
Northeast	Robshaw, Einar Paul	1981
Northeast	Rochman, Morris	1975
Northeast	Rock, James A.	1994
Northeast	Rockwell, Richard H.	1991
Northeast	Rocque, Gerald O.	1979
Northeast	Rodriguez, Don H.	1975
Northeast	Rogers, James D.	1950
Northeast	Rogers, Phillip S.	1956
Northeast	Roig, J. Adalberto	1960
Northeast	Roitman, Aaron H.	1970
Northeast	Rolwing, F. David	1995
Northeast	Roman, Robert A.	2004
Northeast	Romoser, William	1971
Northeast	Roselle, Ernest E.	1956
Northeast	Rosenthal, William	1952
Northeast	Rosner, William E.	2015
Northeast	Ross, Coleman D.	1991
Northeast	Round, Louis B.	1944
Northeast	Rowan, Edward L.	1987
Northeast	Rundman III, Sven J.	2018
Northeast	Rusell, H. Bruce	1987
Northeast	Ruskin, Victor	1969
Northeast	Ryder, George D.	1950
Northeast	Sadock, Robert T.	2012
Northeast	Sanford, Augusta L.	1980
Northeast	Sanford, William	1965
Northeast	Santiago Jr., Lorenzo	1990
Northeast	Santoro, Rudolph J.	1998
Northeast	Scanlan, Gerard A.	2013
Northeast	Schautz, Arthur G.	1956
Northeast	Scheiberling, Edward	1957
Northeast	Schell Jr., A.J.	1969
Northeast	Schiff, John M.	1953
Northeast	Schiller, S. Gary	1977
Northeast	Schmidt, Albert S.	1959
Northeast	Schnapp, Jay E.	1992
Northeast	Schroeder, Gary M.	2011
Northeast	Schultz, Eric H.	2015
Northeast	Shupert, William H.	2018
Northeast	Schwab, Leonard C.	1990
Northeast	Schwartz, Charles C.	1959
Northeast	Schultz, Robert W.	1997
Northeast	Setzer, David E.	1995
Northeast	Severino, John A.	2003
Northeast	Sewell Jr., Laurence	1980
Northeast	Shapiro, Harold D.	1985
Northeast	Sharp Jr., Alfred E.	1973
Northeast	Shelp, Walter A.	1965
Northeast	Sherman, Larry R.	2004
Northeast	Shubatt, William F.	1991
Northeast	Short, David R.	2006
Northeast	Sibley, Edward H.	1968
Northeast	Siek, Raymond H.	1970
Northeast	Silber, Max I.	1955
Northeast	Sille, Rudolph V.	1989
Northeast	Simays, Barry	2019
Northeast	Simmons, Grant G.	1964
Northeast	Simon, Carl H.	1969
Northeast	Simon, Walter O.	1970
Northeast	Sincerbeaux, Frank	1945
Northeast	Sinclair, John G.	1974
Northeast	Singer, Herbert T.	1953
Northeast	Sink, Kenneth C.	1972
Northeast	Sirhal, Robert J.	1999
Northeast	Skinner, Robert S.	1976
Northeast	Slesnick, William	1972
Northeast	Sliney, Paul J.	2012
Northeast	Sloane, Jonathan G.	2009
Northeast	Sloane, Marshall M.	1983
Northeast	Sluizer Jr., Mervyn	1983
Northeast	Smith, Percy R.	1954
Northeast	Smith, Sampson G.	1967
Northeast	Smith Jr., Robert	2005
Northeast	Smythe, D. Verner	1963
Northeast	Snook, Paul T.	1989
Northeast	Snyder, A.F.	1965
Northeast	Snyder Jr., Neil N.	1985
Northeast	Soden, Richard A.	2001
Northeast	Soles, Edward	1960
Northeast	Somers Jr., Richard	1984
Northeast	Spaulding, R.Z.	1945
Northeast	Speris, William R.	1976
Northeast	Spencer, William B.	1948
Northeast	Spitz, Charles Alfred	2011
Northeast	Sprague, Darlene	2011
Northeast	Startzel, Pamela A.	2019
Northeast	Statkiewicz, Robert	2020
Northeast	Steiner, Edward J.	1971
Northeast	Stender, Albert W.	1959
Northeast	Sterner, E. Donald	1959
Northeast	Stimming, William H.	1956
Northeast	Stockham, Thomas	1944
Northeast	Stone, Albert H.	1944
Northeast	Stone, H. James	1962
Northeast	Storer, Theodore L.	1946
Northeast	Stoughton, Spencer	1988
Northeast	Strang, Edmund D.	1995
Northeast	Strauss, Herbert D.	1969
Northeast	Strickler, Daniel N.	1965
Northeast	Stroehmann Jr., Harold	1969
Northeast	Sullivan, Richard T.	2015
Northeast	Sullivan Jr., Robert J.	1980
Northeast	Swab, Roy C.	1986
Northeast	Swartz, Dr. Alan	1977
Northeast	Swope, Dr. Charles	1950
Northeast	Talbot, David J.	2013
Northeast	Tanner, Harris M.	1984
Northeast	Taylor, Hon. Charles	1950
Northeast	Taylor, Osborne K.	1958
Northeast	Taylor, William D.	1968
Northeast	Taylor, William D.	1986
Northeast	Teat, Joseph E.	1979
Northeast	Terry, Hon. Walter	1968
Northeast	Thomas, Russell C.	1971
Northeast	Thompson, Carlton	1967
Northeast	Thompson, Edward	1966
Northeast	Thompson, Leonard	1965
Northeast	Thorp, Christine Mary	2019
Northeast	Thurston, Lester R.	1954
Northeast	Tipton, Russell D.	1978
Northeast	Tito, James L.	1995
Northeast	Todd, E. Murray	1967
Northeast	Todd, George L.	1952
Northeast	Tomchuck, Mary	2011
Northeast	Traber III, George	1965
Northeast	Traupman, Arnold F.	2010
Northeast	Treadway, Morton C.	1955
Northeast	Troutman, William I.	1957
Northeast	Trick, Kaylene D.	2011
Northeast	Twichell, Clarence H.	1953
Northeast	Urffer, Clarence F.	1972
Northeast	Valentine, Parker T.	1972
Northeast	Vanden Berghe Sr., Raymond J.	1998
Northeast	VanDerHoef, E.R.	1989
Northeast	VanRoosen, Donald	1985
Northeast	Verbraska, David	2019
Northeast	Vesey, John	2015
Northeast	Vieser, William L.	1960
Northeast	Von Bacho Sr., Paul	1977
Northeast	Voros, Gerald J.	1985
Northeast	Vosburgh, Charles	1951
Northeast	Waaland, Thomas	1967
Northeast	Wadsworth, Frank H.	1968
Northeast	Wagner, Robert N.	1983
Northeast	Walsh, David J.	2019
Northeast	Ward, Edwin R.	1994
Northeast	Ware, Paul W.	2000
Northeast	Ware, John H.	1947
Northeast	Waring, Fred	1950
Northeast	Warner Jr., Alfred	1944
Northeast	Wasmund, Paul	1961
northeast	Watson Jr., Thomas j.	1955
Northeast	Weil, Frank L.	1944
Northeast	Weil, Sheldon	1990
Northeast	Wellman, Sheila L.	1993
Northeast	Wells USN, Capt. Chester	1944
Northeast	Wells, Kenneth D.	1964
Northeast	West, Frances M.	2006
Northeast	West, Stanley R.	1957
Northeast	Westmoreland, Reid	1975
Northeast	Westmoreland, William	1969
Northeast	Whaples, Heywood	1944
Northeast	Whisler, William D.	1973
Northeast	White, E. Lee	1983
Northeast	White, Harry L.	1956
Northeast	White Jr., Herbert	1974
Northeast	Whitmore, Kay R.	1989
Northeast	Wiese, J. Frederic	1954
Northeast	Wiley, Frank H.	1961
Northeast	Wiley, Lee A.	1968
Northeast	Will, Eric W.	1965
Northeast	Williams, Barry F.	2018
Northeast	Williams, Curtis L.	1956
Northeast	Williams, J. Harold	1971
Northeast	Williams, Lyman P.	1974
Northeast	Williams, Paul W.	1963
Northeast	Williams, Walter F.	1990
Northeast	Williams, William W.	1956
Northeast	Wilson, Edward F.	1973
Northeast	Wilson, Guy W.	1961
Northeast	Wilson, James S.	2007
Northeast	Wilson Jr., John	1973
Northeast	Wines, Richard L.	1982
Northeast	Wintermute, Douglas	1975
Northeast	Wolboldt, Daniel W.	2007
Northeast	Wolfgang Jr., John L.	2001
Northeast	Wortley III, George	1981
Northeast	Wozencraft USA, Col. Frank W.	1961
Northeast	Wrinn, William	1964
Northeast	Wurster, Vesper L.	1986
Northeast	Wyckoff, William S.	1967
Northeast	Yarbrough, Edwin	2020
Northeast	Yoh Jr., Harold L.	1995
Northeast	Young, Dorothy	2021
Northeast	Young, Harold W.	1971
Northeast	Young, John B.	1977
Northeast	Yunich, David L.	1968
Northeast	Zach, Alvin L.	2016
Northeast	Zezza, Carlo F.	1967
Central	Abel, Paul H.	1975
Central	Acers, James D.	2003
Central	Ahler, Kenneth J.	1989
Central	Albert, Dr. James	1985
Central	Alexander, Dr. Ernest R.	1954
Central	Allen, George L.	1997
Central	Allen, Thomas D.	1997
Central	Allen, Wyeth	1952
Central	Alley, Michael J.	2005
Central	Altchuler, Dr. Steven L.	2006
Central	Alter, Most Rev. Karl	1961
Central	Anderson, Byron L.	1978
Central	Anderson, Chandler	1987
Central	Anderson, Glenn G.	2000
Central	Anderson, J. Patrick	2012
Central	Anderson, Lowell E.	1992
Central	Anderson, Richard P.	1972
Central	Anderson, Robert E.	1993
Central	Anderson, Robert H.	1973
Central	Anderson, Van F.	1990
Central	Anger, Frank G.	1960
Central	Anspach, Charles L.	1946
Central	Anuta, Michael J.	1967
Central	Artmanis, Adolfs A.	1976
Central	Ashton, John C.	1976
Central	Augustus, Ellsworth H.	1951
Central	Ause, Orval H.	1974
Central	Austin, Richard H.	1974
Central	Aymond, A.H.	1968
Central	Backus, August Charles	1948
Central	Bailey, Bruce S.	2008
Central	Banks, Ernest	1969
Central	Baker, Earl L.	1970
Central	Barnes, Zane E.	1979
Central	Barrow, Russell J.	1962
Central	Bartlett, Raymond	2019
Central	Bartrem, Col. Duane H.	1983
Central	Basa, Frank J.	1998
Central	Basar, Ed	2019
Central	Bates, Charles J.	2002
Central	Bauer, Carroll A.	1977
Central	Bawden, John Duvall	1972
Central	Baylor, H.D.	1943
Central	Bechik, Anthony	1978
Central	Beck, John G.	1960
Central	Becker, Richard F.	1972
Central	Beebe Sr., John A.	2007
Central	Belcher, Donald D.	2002
Central	Bell, Charles D.	1972
Central	Bell, Sandra Lee	1998
Central	Bennett, Robert B.	1979
Central	Bernhard, Carl W.	1976
Central	Bezanson, Peter F.	1983
Central	Billiu, E. Carter	2001
Central	Bingham, Barry	2008
Central	Bird, William J.	1975
Central	Bishop, Donald J.	1979
Central	Blaisdell, Ronald	2018
Central	Blanchard, Henry G.	1972
Central	Blessinger, Raphael	1965
Central	Bloch, Thomas M.	1962
Central	Boeshaar, Richard Tucker	2014
Central	Bolton, Oliver P.	1968
Central	Bookout, John G.	1987
Central	Bookwalter, Dr. Karl	1954
Central	Bordeaux, Winbert	1997
Central	Boven, Thomas M.	1995
Central	Boyle, Bruce C.	2015
Central	Boyles, Walter B.	1982
Central	Braden, Frank	1958
Central	Bradshaw, Robert J.	1976
Central	Brand, Michael R.	2021
Central	Brannon, Robert L.	1993
Central	Brewer, Leo P.	1989
Central	Briggs, C. William	1985
Central	Briggs, Robert W.	1972
Central	Brookbank Jr., Earl	1980
Central	Brookhart, Curt	2019
Central	Brothers Jr., Alfred	2001
Central	Brown, John N.	1999
Central	Brown, Ned L.	2000
Central	Brown, Robert C.	1957
Central	Browne Jr., Ernest	1984
Central	Brozzo, J. James	1993
Central	Brundage, Avery	1957
Central	Bryan, Leslie A.	1959
Central	Bryant, Edwin E.	1971
Central	Buehler, Robert O.	1962
Central	Burkhardt, Craig S.	2010
Central	Butt, B. Keith	2011
Central	Cairns, Joseph V.	1975
Central	Callner, Adolph J.	1984
Central	Cambridge, Jack R.	1996
Central	Cameron, M. Glenn	2010
Central	Campbell, Robert E.	1975
Central	Campbell, Judge William	1943
Central	Caperton, A. Frank	1999
Central	Carlsen, Ted	1987
Central	Casady, Simon W.	1993
Central	Cathcart, Silas S.	1970
Central	Chamberlain, Robert	1983
Central	Chambers, Judge C.C.	1965
Central	Chandler, John A.	2012
Central	Chandler, Lawrence	1979
Central	Chestang, Leon W.	1997
Central	Christiansen, Dean O.	1990
Central	Christopherson, Reid	2004
Central	Church, Meredith	1977
Central	Clark, Sheldon	1943
Central	Clarke, Michael S.	2007
Central	Cody, John Cardinal	1969
Central	Colbert Jr., Patrick	1989
Central	Cole, Edward N.	1965
Central	Coleman, Lester E.	1983
Central	Colletti, Teresa A.	2021
Central	Confer, William J.	1994
Central	Cooper, Morris D.	2015
Central	Corgan, Randall J.	2017
Central	Cortes, Carlos	1972
Central	Cory, Paul E.	1972
Central	Covington, Charles J.	1960
Central	Coy, Francis A.	1969
Central	Coyle, Michael J.	1989
Central	Creighton, Hobart	1956
Central	Cronin, Lucia D.	2008
Central	Crum, A. Eugene	1983
Central	Cunningham, Robert	1989
Central	Currie, M.R.	1948
Central	Curtis, John E.	1985
Central	Czapor, Edward P.	1976
Central	Czech, Raymond R.	2012
Central	Dace, Duane J.	2003
Central	Dalton, Julie	2018
Central	Dankworth IV, Charles	2000
Central	Dauby, Nathan L.	1948
Central	Daugherty, Robert B.	1989
Central	Davidsmeyer, J. R.	1970
Central	Davies, William E.	2003
Central	Davis, Robert S.	1995
Central	Davy, Philip S.	1981
Central	Deckenbach, Jr., John F.	1985
Central	Degenfelder, Roy C.	1983
Central	DeGirolamo, Dale A.	2017
Central	Deverell, Michael J.	2005
Central	Dickerson, Kandra	2016
Central	Diffley, Marie T.	2007
Central	Dille, Robert J.	1978
Central	Dillenback, Darryl	2018
Central	Dillenburg, Margaret	1997
Central	Dillon, Paul E.	1988
Central	Doerr, Emmett J.	1974
Central	Douglas, Raymond	1983
Central	Duecker, Ronald L.	1994
Central	Duffee, Michael W.	2008
Central	Dukes, Wayne L.	2002
Central	Dunham, John H.	1975
Central	Dunkin, R.D.	1995
Central	Dunn, Terrence P.	2000
Central	Durham, Charles W.	1991
Central	Duroe, Albert C.	1996
Central	Duwe, William E.	1982
Central	Dyer-Hurdon, John	1995
Central	Easterly, Gary L.	1998
Central	Eckelkamp Jr., Louis	2004
Central	Eckert, William G.	1994
Central	Ehrlich, David	2018
Central	Eisendrath, Joseph	1975
Central	Elden, Hon. S.J.	1985
Central	Elliott, Connie	2011
Central	Ellis, I. Barnett	1991
Central	Engelbart, Roger W.	2015
Central	English, Harold	1968
Central	Enterline, Edwin K.	1982
Central	Epstein, Brad L.	2017
Central	Erwin, James W.	2006
Central	Everhart, Donald	2020
Central	Every, David R.	2009
Central	Farley, John R.	1994
Central	Farnsworth, Carlyle	1986
Central	Fee, Martha J.	1993
Central	Fenn, Roy N.	1950
Central	Fenneman, Craig	2007
Central	Fetridge, William	1950
Central	Feudner, John L.	1973
Central	Fiebig, Charles W.	1995
Central	Findley, William H.	2007
Central	Finerty, Dr. William	2005
Central	Firman Jr., Royal	1964
Central	Flowers, Richard W.	2009
Central	Floyd, Curtiss O.	1999
Central	Flynn, George P.	1990
Central	Fosnough, Robert D.	1998
Central	Foster, Harvey G.	1972
Central	Foster, Dr. Robert P.	1975
Central	Fox, W. Shirell	1981
Central	Francis, Elaine S.	1996
Central	Francis III, George F.	1998
Central	Froemel, Ernest	2013
Central	Funk, Donald I.	1994
Central	Gardner Jr., Harold	1980
Central	Garner Jr., Ernest	1977
Central	Garrison, William L.	1994
Central	Gasterland, Dirk L.	2003
Central	Gaynor, Robert H.	1978
Central	George Jr., Abner H.	2010
Central	Gehlhausen, Keith A.	2009
Central	Gelsomno, John P.	2009
Central	Gentles, Dr. W.H.	1946
Central	Geralds, Jeffrey W.	2013
Central	Gettelfinger, Gerald	2001
Central	Gibson, Robert N.	1943
Central	Gibson, Thomas M.	1991
Central	Gill, Harvey U.	1968
Central	Gille, Daniel	2018
Central	Gitzen, John G.	1987
Central	Godwin, Gregory Allen	2013
Central	Goetz, George G.	1963
Central	Goiolfelty, Phillip R.	1991
Central	Gold Jr., Ned Cooper	1989
Central	Gole, Gary C.	2009
Central	Good, Harry	1943
Central	Goodwin, Charles D.	2012
Central	Goodwin, Glenn L.	1982
Central	Gorman, Michael A.	1948
Central	Gotsch Sr., Michael G.	2021
Central	Gottschalk, John	1998
Central	Grant, Robert A.	1972
Central	Graska, Jon E.	2002
Central	Gramelspacher, Claude A.	1953
Central	Grass, Judge Henry	1946
Central	Graves, William P.	1998
Central	Gray, Milton H.	1963
Central	Grier III, James R.	1997
Central	Griffin, James T.	1955
Central	Grimes, Jamies Miller	1985
Central	Grimes, Kenneth J.	1993
Central	Grossman, James M.	2009
Central	Grossman, Jane L.	2008
Central	Grove, Christopher A.	2011
Central	Gschwend, William C.	1952
Central	Gum, Wilson F.	2000
Central	Gunji, Ken	1997
Central	Guzzetta, Jean Marie	2021
Central	Haddock, Bradley E.	1994
Central	Hahn, Jeffrey R.	2018
Central	Halpern, Richard C.	1988
Central	Halsey, Paul F.	1993
Central	Hampton, Clark W.	2005
Central	Hanauer, Burton A.	1991
Central	Hann, C. Charles	1991
Central	Hansen, Edward A.	2012
Central	Hansen, Harry N.	1962
Central	Hapgood, L.A.	1970
Central	Hanke, Oscar August	1946
Central	Haram, Ben L.	1948
Central	Harris, Stephen J.	2015
Central	Harrison, Dan M.	1973
Central	Harrison, Gary L.	2005
Central	Harsh, Sr., William P.	1983
Central	Hart, J. Dan	1984
Central	Hasty, Terry L.	2002
Central	Hatch, Perry	1943
Central	Hauserman, Ben M.	1974
Central	Hawkins, Thomas F.	1963
Central	Hawkinson, Roy W.	1972
Central	Heath, Betty	1985
Central	Heavenrich, Jr., Max P.	1966
Central	Hedquist, John G.	1979
Central	Heffern, Gordon E.	1985
Central	Heckrodt, Frank H.	1984
Central	Heiligenstein, R. Ron	1988
Central	Hemmer, Roger J.	1990
Central	Herman, Grant	1987
Central	Hill, Merritt D.	1961
Central	Hill, Wilbur T.	1980
Central	Hingst, John	1980
Central	Hirsch, Lawrence	1965
Central	Hisey, Robert	2020
Central	Hitchcock Jr., Reuben	1972
Central	Hoffman, Arthur F.	1979
Central	Holler, Albert C.	1974
Central	Hollingsworth, Morton	1959
Central	Holmes, Jr., Carlton W.	1983
Central	Holt, Steven A.	2007
Central	Hook, August F.	1964
Central	Hornung, Otto C.	1956
Central	Horton Jr., John C.	1983
Central	Horwath, Janet L.	2001
Central	Horwath, Larry C.	1988
Central	Hosier, James W.	2006
Central	Howard, Philip G.	2000
Central	Hoyer, Raymond A.	1946
Central	Huey, Arthur S.	1967
Central	Hultman, Evan L.	1977
Central	Humbert, Russell J.	1956
Central	Humburg, Glen O.	1977
Central	Hunt, Daniel E.	2015
Central	Hunt, Douglas E.	1959
Central	Hunt, Herold C.	1953
Central	Hunt, W. Ben	1948
Central	Hunter, Robert N.	1980
Central	Hutchinson, John	1954
Central	Hyde, Merrill “Bud”	2000
Central	Hymes, Richard W.	1981
Central	Ice, Harry T.	1971
Central	Inman, Dr. John E.	2005
Central	Jackson, The Hon. Perry B.	1970
Central	Jacobsen, Thomas H.	2002
Central	Jadel, John C.	1986
Central	Jakoubek, George A.	1984
Central	James MD, Dr. Thomas E.	2005
Central	Jamieson, A. Douglas	1946
Central	Jannsen, Martin T.	2006
Central	Janus, C. Otto	1948
Central	Jenks, Downing B.	1975
Central	Jensen, Ronald G.	2005
Central	Johnson, Earle L.	1957
Central	Johnson, Henry A.	1983
Central	Johnson, H.F.	1943
Central	Johnson, Philip J.	2012
Central	Johnson, Russell B.	1995
Central	Johnson, Ted L.	1974
Central	Johnston, Wayne A.	1953
Central	Johnstone, R.T.	1971
Central	Jolitz, Charles E.	1971
Central	Jones, Richard H.	1994
Central	Jordan, Eugene F.	1997
Central	Judy, Richard B.	2004
Central	Kaiser, Paul J.	1984
Central	Kasal, Brian	2011
Central	Kasiorek, Jason	2020
Central	Kasperson, Richard	1993
Central	Kelleher, Robert F.	1989
Central	Kelley, Col. Eugene W.	1966
Central	Kemp Jr., Albert I.	1987
Central	Kent, Al	2018
Central	Kern, James M.	2006
Central	Kerner, Hon. Otto	1962
Central	Kerr, Jonathan Charles	2021
Central	Kessler, Hon. Carl	1981
Central	Ketchman, Rodger A.	1980
Central	Kettley, William E.	1998
Central	Keyes IV, M.A.	1990
Central	Kidd, William C.	1962
Central	King, Alan	2019
Central	King, Kenneth Paul	2005
Central	King, Stephen B.	2001
Central	Kinney, Eugene M.	1985
Central	Kloko, Dennis W.	1975
Central	Knauf, Edmund R.	1974
Central	Knight, Charles F.	1994
Central	Knoblauch, Arthur	1964
Central	Koch, Richard A.	2016
Central	Kolski, Russell S.	2008
Central	Korte, Ralph F.	1989
Central	Krause, Peter J.	2006
Central	Kuehn, Vernon J.	1954
Central	Kuntz, Edward J.	1974
Central	Kuryla, William C.	1973
Central	Landes, Edward	1977
Central	Lang, Charles Victor	2010
Central	Lang, Philip S.	1977
Central	Lange, Skip	1989
Central	LaPolla, James J.	1999
Central	Laraway, Steven A.	2008
Central	Larkin, Wade W.	1973
Central	LaRue, Bruce M.	1974
Central	Lasier, David R.	1960
Central	Layden Jr., Donald	2001
Central	Lee Jr., Raymond	1986
Central	Lee, Wallace O.	1943
Central	Leet, Richard H.	1979
Central	Leinweber, Wesley J.	1948
Central	Lenicheck, Harold A.	1970
Central	Leonardson, C.O.	1956
Central	LeVeque, Frederick	1972
Central	Levy, Irving J.	1993
Central	Ling, Daniel S.	1954
Central	Lischer, Henry J.	1969
Central	Lockshin, Jerrold L.	1996
Central	Logan, Serge E.	1973
Central	Londe, Alan M.	1996
Central	Long, Gregory A.	2007
Central	Long, Robert A.	1991
Central	LoPresti, Michael S.	2015
Central	Lord, John N.	1957
Central	Lougheed, Cook	1977
Central	Love, Paul H.	1960
Central	Lundin, Vernard E.	1972
Central	Lyle, Paul H.	1964
Central	Lynn, Robert B.	1968
Central	Lyster, Michael D.	2003
Central	MacCourtney, Leo	1988
Central	Magennis, Charles B.	1981
Central	Makowski, John	2011
Central	Mann, Louis L.	1960
Central	Marinaro, John T.	1974
Central	Maris, M.D., Charles R.	2013
Central	Marr, Weaver M.	1963
Central	Martin Jr., E.A.	1973
Central	Martin, Morris B.	1971
Central	Mason, George	1952
Central	Mason, O.B.	1964
Central	Mason Jr., Raymond	1976
Central	Mathis Jr., Allen W.	1966
Central	McAuliffe, Most Rev. M.	1979
Central	McCahill, Charles F.	1947
Central	McCart Jr., Donald K.	1982
Central	McClure, Archibald	1972
Central	McCollister, Stephen J.	2012
Central	McCorison, Guy E.	1963
Central	McCoy, James M.	1987
Central	McCrea, Bruce K.	2002
Central	McDonnell, Sanford	1983
Central	McGavran, Harry G.	1959
Central	McGowan, Steven	2011
Central	McGown, Wayne F.	2000
Central	McKenzie, John W.	1989
Central	McLaughlin, James R.	1985
Central	McLaughlin, Paul G.	1994
Central	McLoughlin, John J.	2008
Central	Mead, Stanton W.	1961
Central	Meilahn, Dirk L.	2003
Central	Melland, Russell O.	1972
Central	Mellor Jr., Frederic	1987
Central	Mendenhall, Kirk	1975
Central	Menk, Louis W.	1973
Central	Meyer, Adolph M.	1975
Central	Michael, Stanley A.	1974
Central	Milbury, Douglas A.	1994
Central	Millard, Joseph N.	1987
Central	Miller Jr., Paul A.	1979
Central	Miller, Wallace T.	1973
Central	Miller Jr., William	1981
Central	Milligan, Leslie W.	1979
Central	Mills, Richard H.	1977
Central	Milsted, Louis	2011
Central	Monson, Tom E.	2016
Central	Moore Jr., Arch A.	1976
Central	Moore, Rodger L.	2005
Central	Moore III, Young	1981
Central	Morgan II, Lyle W.	1998
Central	More, Roy A.	2017
Central	Moses, Lloyd R.	1964
Central	Moyer, Roger C.	1987
Central	Mugrage, Diane F.	1980
Central	Muiznieks, Veldois	2016
Central	Mullins, Dennis H.	1978
Central	Mundt, William C.	1948
Central	Munn, Andrew C.	1976
Central	Munn, Clarence	1962
Central	Murray, Michael D.	2002
Central	Neesley, John D.	1980
Central	Neff, Eric E.	2021
Central	Neidhoefer, James R.	1974
Central	Nelson, Robert C.	1991
Central	Nemanich, John G.	1968
Central	Nevitt, George P.	1957
Central	Nichols, Robert L.	2009
Central	Noack, Patrick A.	2000
Central	Norris, Max S.	1970
Central	North, Sidney B.	1969
Central	Northrup, Richard B.	2014
Central	Noyes, Wilbert	1966
Central	Nunn, USN, RADM Ira H.	1963
Central	Nygren, Gregory	2019
Central	Oakman, Jay C.	2015
Central	Oakman, Sheryl	2011
Central	Oldowski, Carol A.	2002
Central	Oldowski, Robert S.	1994
Central	Olson, Dean A.	1982
Central	Olson, Gary G.	2005
Central	Osborn, Jack W.	1971
Central	Pace, Stanley C.	1976
Central	Paige, Harland E.	1961
Central	Palmer, Robert	2018
Central	Paprocki, John	2020
Central	Parker, Thomas L.	1977
Central	Paulsen, Edward D.	1985
Central	Pavis, Raymond A.	1971
Central	Pease, Edward A.	1992
Central	Pederson, Jon R.	2002
Central	Peschke, Adolph E.	2011
Central	Petersen, Cole D.	2012
Central	Petersen, Dean H.	1977
Central	Peterson, John C.	2003
Central	Peterson, Kenneth A.	2003
Central	Peterson, Robert W.	1993
Central	Pheiffer, Paul H.	1972
Central	Phillips Jr., Arties R.	2004
Central	Phillips III, Lee E.	1985
Central	Phillips, Lewis E.	1954
Central	Phillips, Ray Oliver	1970
Central	Pierce, Harold E.	1966
Central	Pierper Sr., Richard	2002
Central	Piggott Jr., Cecil	1991
Central	Pike, Wardell H.	1980
Central	Pile, Robert E.	1992
Central	Pinderski, Jerome W.	1987
Central	Pingel, John S.	1974
Central	Plain, George B.	1961
Central	Plater, Wade Richard	1967
Central	Porter, Robert A.	2006
Central	Porterfield, Burt	1991
Central	Pratt, Dennis W.	1998
Central	Prisk, Samuel J.	1987
Central	Qua, George F.	1997
Central	Raducha, John P.	2008
Central	Rahmberg, Charles A.	1978
Central	Randall, D. Randy	1985
Central	Randolph Jr., Aaron	2006
Central	Ransburg, Gregg	1966
Central	Rariden, David H.	1984
Central	Rastetter, Louis C.	1959
Central	Ray, Harvey J.	1972
Central	Redman, Byron P.	1965
Central	Reed, Virgil	2010
Central	Refior, Robert L.	1972
Central	Reid Jr., Byron S.	1965
Central	Reneker, Robert W.	1966
Central	Replogle, Arthur S.	1976
Central	Reppert, Arthur I.	1976
Central	Rettig, Max K.	1986
Central	Reynolds, Robert H.	1991
Central	Rhea, Richard E.	1973
Central	Rice, Rev. John M.	1973
Central	Riegel, Myron H.	1999
Central	Riley, L. Clyde	1964
Central	Roberts, Leonard E.	2014
Central	Roberts, Roy S.	1997
Central	Robinson, John H.	1991
Central	Rocker, William F.	2006
Central	Rolley, Alan W.	1991
Central	Rompel, Rev. Henry	1950
Central	Rosenberry, Marvin	1943
Central	Ross, J. Patrick	1987
Central	Rothmann, Bruce F.	2001
Central	Rounds, Mary Anne	1980
Central	Rownd, Robert S.	2007
Central	Rugen, Richard C.	1959
Central	Runnels Jr., Robert	1995
Central	Russell Jr., Richard	2000
Central	Ruthenberg, Donald	1995
Central	Sadler Jr., Carl L.	1973
Central	Saint-Pierre, Michael R.	2013
Central	Sanders, Richard J.	1971
Central	Savage, John	2019
Central	Savone, David	2020
Central	Schantz, George	1975
Central	Scherer, Walter K.	1957
Central	Schermerhorn, Estel	2001
Central	Schimmele, Ralph G.	1985
Central	Schloss, William L.	1964
Central	Schnell Eugene J.	2017
Central	Schober, Norman	1975
Central	Schrank, Edwin P.	1978
Central	Schricker, Henry F.	1943
Central	Schroeder, John P.	1987
Central	Schuetz, John N.	1978
Central	Schultz, Danile B.	1980
Central	Scott, Lee R.J.	1962
Central	Seaborne, Douglas	1995
Central	Seaborne, Sara L.	1992
Central	Searcy, Millard L.	1963
Central	Seaton, George L.	1961
Central	Segersin, Daniel T.	1998
Central	Seipel, William J.	1997
Central	Seltzer, Louis B.	1958
Central	Shalhope, Lee F.	1967
Central	Shank, Donald B.	1974
Central	Sharpe III, Albert	1992
Central	Shegog, George W.	1995
Central	Sheil, Bernard J.	1961
Central	Sheppard, David N.	2021
Central	Sherer, Forrest G.	1957
Central	Sherwood, George K.	2004
Central	Shore, Joseph	2020
Central	Shuff, Robert E.	1971
Central	Sickendick, Keith William	2017
Central	Silvertein, Dr. Abe	1977
Central	Simpson, James Henry	2014
Central	Simpson, Thomas C.	2001
Central	Sleik, Thomas S.	1986
Central	Skultety, Dr. F.Miles	1975
Central	Skutt, V.J.	1977
Central	Sleik, Jr., John T.	1969
Central	Smith, Frank Lloyd	1973
Central	Smith, MD, Dr. H. Wayne	1971
Central	Smith, James B.	1986
Central	Smith, Joe E.	1987
Central	Smith, John F.	2007
Central	Smith, Sr., Mowry	1948
Central	Smith, Roy A.	1994
Central	Smith, Stanton K.	1965
Central	Snyder, Dayle O.	1989
Central	Sorenson, Robert	1995
Central	Spellman, Edward L.	1957
Central	Spettel, Thomas R.	2002
Central	Spivey, MajGen. Delmar T.	1964
Central	Spray, Elwin	2017
Central	St.Pierre, Michael Robert	2013
Central	Stannard, Grant A.	1981
Central	Stark, Jack J.	1964
Central	Starn, William F.	1986
Central	Starr, Floyd	1950
Central	Starr, J. Philip	1993
Central	Stauffeneker, Ernest	2005
Central	Stecker, Frederick	1973
Central	Steele, Hugh H.	1968
Central	Stein, Edward B.	1981
Central	Sternberg, Gene H.	1967
Central	Stewart, James M.	1967
Central	Stewart, R. Douglas	1946
Central	Strebel, Roger W.	2000
Central	Streit, Gerald L.	1996
Central	Steward, David L.	2014
Central	Stonecipher, Marvin “Stoney”	2014
Central	Stowe, Dr. David L.	2021
Central	Stuart Jr., Robert A.	2012
Central	Stull, Paul A.	1999
Central	Sturza, Robert J.	1999
Central	Sullivan, John F.	1983
Central	Sutton, Rodney C.	1956
Central	Sverdrup, Leif J.	1974
Central	Swartz Jr., Walter	1982
Central	Swensen, Edward S.	1963
Central	Szczys, Robert F.	1998
Central	Tanner, Dr. L. William	1974
Central	Tarnow, Matthew L.	2006
Central	Teeter, Robert W.	1957
Central	Thayer, Harold E.	1974
Central	Thomas III, Franklin	2004
Central	Thomas, John J.	1975
Central	Thomas, Richard	1991
Central	Thompson, A.D.	1968
Central	Thomson, Dwight J.	1966
Central	Thorsen Jr., Harry D.	1967
Central	Toftness, Gordon	1966
Central	Tomlinson, J. Larry	1996
Central	Townley, Robert	1950
Central	Treadwell Jr., Robert	2003
Central	Trescott, Eugene D.	1985
Central	Tripp, H. Marvell	1975
Central	Troike, John A.	1968
Central	Truza, Charles E.	2016
Central	Turner, James M.	1976
Central	Turner, L. William	1974
Central	Tyrell, Donald W.	1956
Central	Urban, Frank H.	1979
Central	Uyl, Daniel Den	1956
Central	Van Dyke, Carleton	1981
Central	Virtue, Jack D.	1987
Central	Vogt, Amanda L.	2019
Central	Vogt, Robert E.	2010
Central	Votava, Russell	2011
Central	Wacker, Edward J.	1992
Central	Wagner, Harry W.	1995
Central	Waldock, William H.	1993
Central	Walgamott, Carm C.	2016
Central	Walker, Willie M.	1987
Central	Wall, Stephen E.	1999
Central	Wallace, Samuel T.	1992
Central	Walneck, Charles T.	2003
Central	Wangerin, Mary	2017
Central	Wanzer III, Sidney	1950
Central	Ward, Denis E.	1996
Central	Warner, Sidney T.	1989
Central	Warren Jr., Alfred S.	1994
Central	Watkins, Don R.	1987
Central	Watson, Jack L.	1977
Central	Watts, Donna I.	1998
Central	Weber, Michael	2020
Central	Weekes, Steven E.	2003
Central	Wehr, Alfred H.	1983
Central	Weinschel, Leo R.	1992
Central	Weisblatt, Melvin	2004
Central	Welsh, Robert J.	1962
Central	Wesley, Robert L.	1997
Central	West, Robert C.	1989
Central	West, Thomas M.	1993
Central	Westendorf, Clarence	1976
Central	Weyrick, David R.	2014
Central	Whelan, Paul A.	1992
Central	Wilhite, James L.	1991
Central	Whitaker, Howard E.	1963
Central	White, George A.	1953
Central	Wilder, Stephan B.	2016
Central	Wilhite, James L.	1991
Central	Wilkening, Rolland	1981
Central	Wilkinson, Delvin Lee	2013
Central	Wilkus, Judge Joseph W.	1971
Central	Williams, Brian P.	1999
Central	Williams, Bruce	2019
Central	Williams, David H.	2015
Central	Williams, George W.	1957
Central	Willoughby, James E.	1996
Central	Wilmoth, William D.	2006
Central	Wilson, Charles W.	1991
Central	Wilson, Dennis L.	2008
Central	Wilson, Jr., Garland	1972
Central	Wilson, Kenneth L.	1961
Central	Wilson, Paul	1960
Central	Wilson, Wallace E.	1974
Central	Winslow, Warren W.	1973
Central	Winter, John L.	2009
Central	With, T.E.	1965
Central	Wollman, Elliott B.	1978
Central	Wood, R. Ray	1996
Central	Wood, Robert E.	1956
Central	Woodall III, John A.	2016
Central	Woolery, Scott	2013
Central	Worley, Brent	2020
Central	Wozar, Louis	1966
Central	Yocum, Ronald H.	2004
Central	Yost, R. Michael	2010
Central	Young, Conrad S.	1983
Central	Younkman, Craig A.	1990
Central	Zahrobsky, Kristopher J.	2014
Central	Zick, James B.	1988
Central	Zilly, G. Sam	1978
Central	Zilmer, Dora M.	1996
Central	Zuroweste, Albert R.	1963
Central	Zvonar, Martin	2008

== See also ==
- Silver Antelope Award
