= Dwan J. Young =

7th Primary General President
- April 5, 1980 – 1988
- Called by: Spencer W. Kimball
- Predecessor: Naomi M. Shumway
- Successor: Michaelene P. Grassli

Personal details
- Born: Dwan Jacobsen; May 1, 1931 (age 94); Salt Lake City, Utah
- Education: Bachelor of Education
- Alma mater: University of Utah
- Spouse(s): Thomas Young, Jr
- Children: 5
- Awards: Silver Buffalo

Dwan Jacobsen Young (born May 1, 1931) was the seventh general president of the Primary organization of the Church of Jesus Christ of Latter-day Saints (LDS Church) from 1980 to 1988.

== Biography ==
Dwan Jacobsen was born in Salt Lake City, Utah. She graduated from South High School (Salt Lake City) in 1948 and later graduated from the University of Utah with a Bachelor of Education. She married Thomas Young, Jr. and they are the parents of five children.

Young became a member of the Primary general board in 1970. Ten years later, she was called to succeed Naomi M. Shumway as the organization's general president. Young served in this capacity until 1988, when her second counselor, Michaelene P. Grassli, was chosen to succeed her. During Young's tenure, Primary changed from a weekday activity to one that was incorporated into the LDS Church's three-hour consolidated worship services.

Upon her release, Young accompanied her husband to Canada, where he served as president of the church's Canada Calgary Mission.

In 1990, Young was awarded the Silver Buffalo Award from the Boy Scouts of America for her work to incorporate Cub Scouting into the LDS Church's Primary program.

Young is a board member and matriarch of Young Electric Sign Company (YESCO).

In 2024, Young was awarded the Guinness World Records title of "world’s oldest water-skier" at the age of 92.

== See also ==
- List of recipients of the Silver Buffalo Award
- In 2023, Young was inducted into the Guinness World Records as the oldest female water skier.

The Church of Jesus Christ of Latter-day Saints titles
Preceded by Naomi M. Shumway	Primary General President; April 5, 1980 – 1988	Succeeded by Michaelene P. Grassli
