= Naomi M. Shumway =

6th Primary General President
- 1974 – April 5, 1980
- Called by: Spencer W. Kimball
- Predecessor: LaVern W. Parmley
- Successor: Dwan J. Young

Personal details
- Born: Naomi Maxfield; October 3, 1922; Provo, Utah
- Died: 22 May 2004 (aged 81); Bountiful, Utah
- Notable works: Primary entry for Encyclopedia of Mormonism
- Spouse(s): Roden Grant Shumway

Naomi Maxfield Shumway (October 3, 1922 – May 22, 2004 ) was the sixth general president of the Primary organization of the Church of Jesus Christ of Latter-day Saints (LDS Church) from 1974 to 1980.

Naomi Maxfield was born in Provo, Utah. She married Roden Grant Shumway.

In 1963, Shumway became a member of the general board of the Primary Association. In 1974, Shumway was selected to succeed LaVern W. Parmley as general president of the organization. Parmley had been the president of the Primary for 23 years. Shumway served until 1980, when she was succeeded by Dwan J. Young.

During Shumway's tenure, the Primary celebrated the 100th anniversary of its founding in 1878 by Aurelia Spencer Rogers. In 1980, Shumway and her counselors approved of a plan to end Primary on weekdays and to incorporate it into the LDS Church's three-hour Sunday worship services. However, the implementation of this plan was left to Shumway's successor, Dwan J. Young.

In the early 1990s, Shumway was selected to write the entry for Primary for Macmillan’s Encyclopedia of Mormonism.

The Church of Jesus Christ of Latter-day Saints titles
Preceded by LaVern W. Parmley	Primary General President; 1974 – April 5, 1980	Succeeded by Dwan J. Young
