= Donald Keith Hummel =

Roman Catholic priest and scouting leader

Donald Keith Hummel is an American Roman Catholic priest of the Archdiocese of Newark. Father Hummel is the Director of the Continuing Education and Formation of Priests for the Archdiocese of Newark. He has served as pastor of St. Bartholomew the Apostle in Scotch Plains, New Jersey from 2000 to 2005.

An Eagle Scout, Father Hummel has served as national chaplain to the National Catholic Committee on Scouting since 2001. He has also served as chaplain at Philmont Scout Ranch in New Mexico and chaplain to four national Scout jamborees. He received the Distinguished Eagle Scout Award in 1999 and the Silver Buffalo Award in 2004.

Currently, he works at Paramus Catholic High School to teach Religion to juniors and seniors, allowing them to broaden their ideas and critical thinking in concepts about God, Jesus Christ, the Holy Spirit, sacraments, and other strong Catholic concepts and beliefs.
