= First ladies and gentlemen of Utah =

Title of the spouse of the governor of Utah

First Lady of Utah
- Seal of Utah

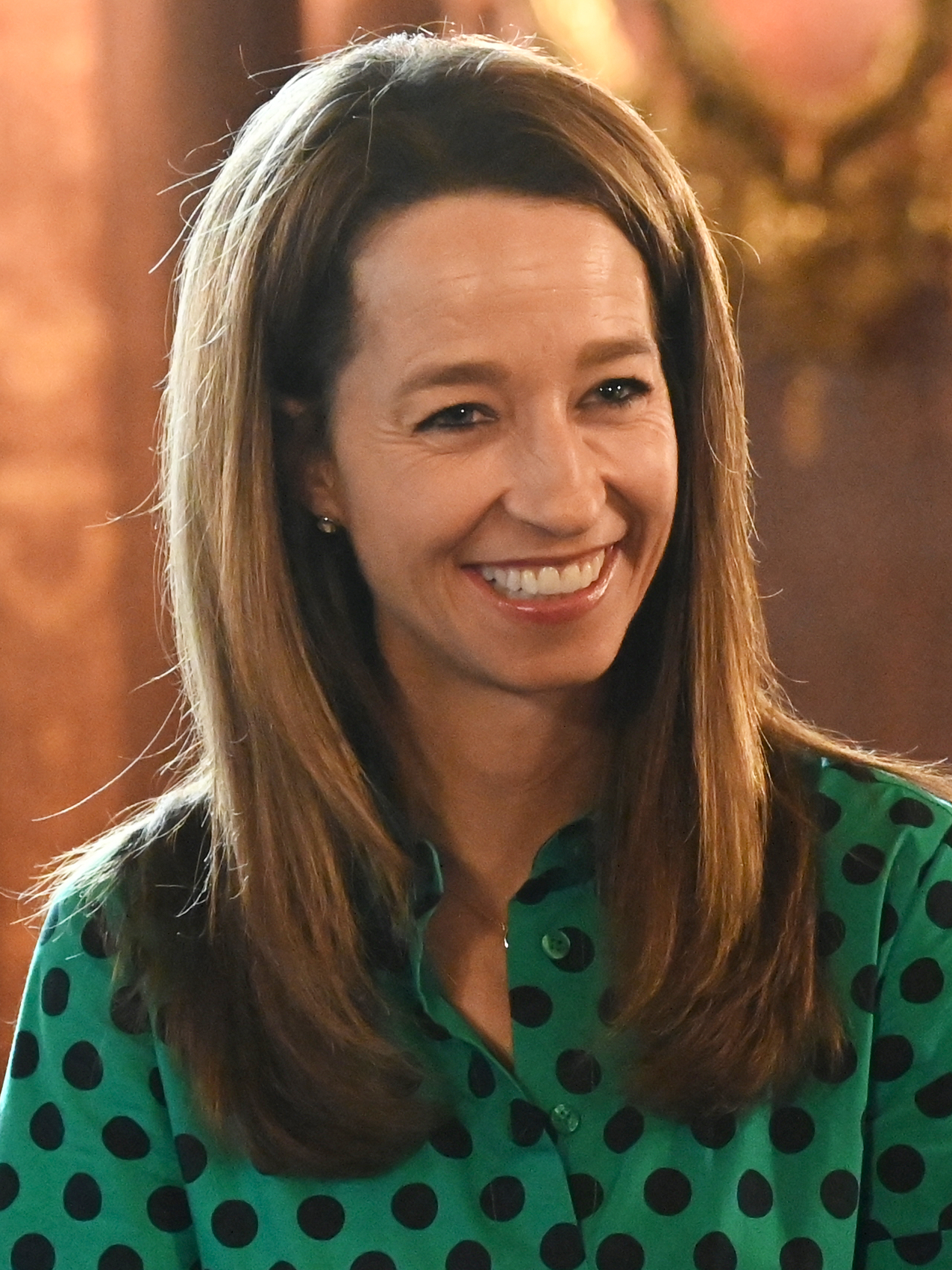
- Current; Abby Cox since January 4, 2021
- Style: Mrs. Cox; Mrs. First Lady
- Residence: Governor's Mansion
- Inaugural holder: Teresa Wells (as first lady); Myron Walker (as first gentleman)
- Formation: January 6, 1896 (130 years ago)
- Website: Official website

First lady or first gentleman of Utah is the title attributed to the wife or husband of the governor of Utah. The holder of the title resides with the governor at the Utah Governor's Mansion in the capital, Salt Lake City.

The current first lady of Utah is Abby Cox, husband of Governor Spencer Cox, who has held the position since January 4, 2021. To date, only one person has served as the first gentleman of Utah since statehood: Myron Walker from 2003 to 2005.

== List of first ladies and gentlemen of Utah ==
First Lady/Gentleman	Term begins	Term ends	Governor	Notes
Teresa Cummings	January 6, 1896	July 9, 1897	Heber Manning Wells	Died in office
Emily Katz	June 15, 1901	January 2, 1905	Heber Manning Wells	
Sarah Elizabeth Taylor	January 2, 1905	January 4, 1909	John Christopher Cutler	
Mary Wrathall	January 4, 1909	January 1, 1917	William Spry	
Ida Maas	January 1, 1917	January 3, 1921	Simon Bamberger	
Afton Rampton	January 3, 1921	January 5, 1925	Charles R. Mabey	
Lottie Brown	January 5, 1925	January 2, 1933	George Dern	
Minnie Blood	January 2, 1933	January 6, 1941	Henry H. Blood	
Florence Maw	January 6, 1941	January 3, 1949	Herbert B. Maw	
Margaret Lee	January 3, 1949	January 7, 1957	J. Bracken Lee	
Ora Clyde	January 7, 1957	January 4, 1965	George Dewey Clyde	
Lucybeth Rampton	January 4, 1965	January 3, 1977	Cal Rampton	
Norma Matheson	January 3, 1977	January 7, 1985	Scott M. Matheson	
Colleen Bangerter	January 7, 1985	January 4, 1993	Norman H. Bangerter	
Jacalyn Leavitt	January 4, 1993	November 5, 2003	Mike Leavitt	
Myron Walker	November 5, 2003	January 3, 2005	Olene Walker	The first man to serve as first gentleman of Utah.
Mary Huntsman	January 3, 2005	August 11, 2009	Jon Huntsman Jr.	
Jeanette Herbert	August 11, 2009	January 4, 2021	Gary Herbert	
Abby Cox	January 4, 2021	Current	Spencer Cox	

== See also ==
- List of governors of Utah
