= 1964 Utah gubernatorial election =

- November 3, 1964
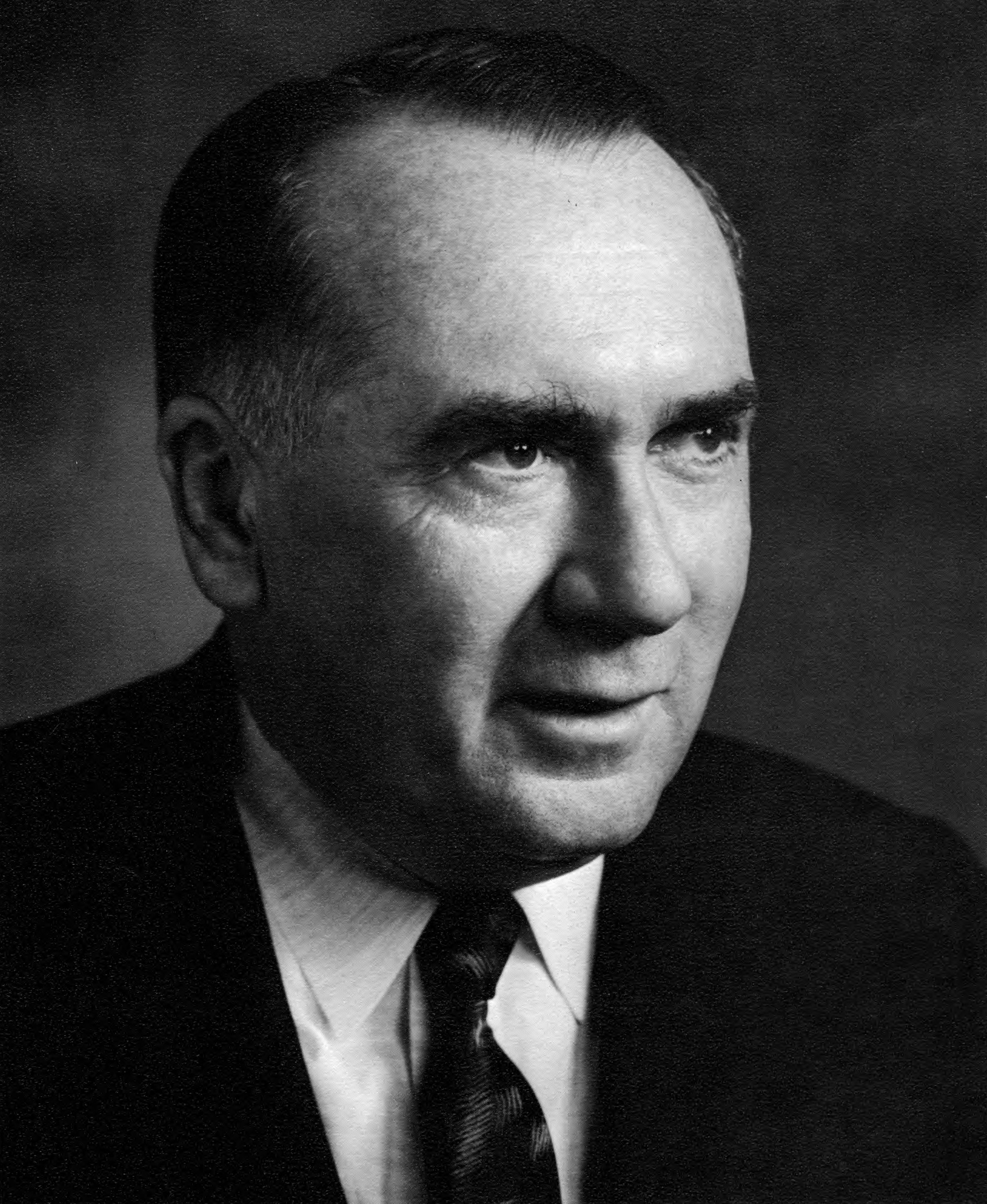

Nominee	Cal Rampton	Mitchell Melich
Party	Democratic	Republican
Popular vote	226,956	171,300
Percentage	56.99%	43.01%
- County results Rampton: 50–60% 60–70% Melich: 50–60% 60–70% 70–80%
Governor before election
George Dewey Clyde
Republican
Elected Governor
Cal Rampton
Democratic

The 1964 Utah gubernatorial election was held on November 3, 1964. Democratic nominee Cal Rampton defeated Republican nominee Mitchell Melich with 56.99% of the vote.

== Primary election ==
Primary elections were held on August 11, 1964.

=== Republican primary ===
==== Candidates ====
- D. James Cannon, former member of Utah House of Representatives
- Mitchell Melich, former member of Utah State Senate

==== Results ====
Republican primary results
Party	Candidate	Votes	%
Republican	Mitchell Melich	63,108	53.01%
Republican	D. James Cannon	55,938	46.99%
Total votes		119,046	100.00%

=== Democratic primary ===
==== Candidates ====
- Ernest Howard Dean, Speaker of Utah House of Representatives
- Cal Rampton, former Davis County attorney

==== Results ====
Democratic primary results
Party	Candidate	Votes	%
Democratic	Cal Rampton	57,848	62.66%
Democratic	Ernest H. Dean	34,470 (Note: The printed abstract contains a typo for Dean in San Juan County and thus his statewide total too. The correct figure in the county is 251 and this is listed on both the handwritten statewide abstract and the county return that gives the results by precinct.)	37.34%
Total votes		92,318	100.00%

== General election ==
=== Candidates ===
- Mitchell Melich, Republican
- Cal Rampton, Democratic

=== Results ===
1964 Utah gubernatorial election
Party	Candidate	Votes	%	±%
Democratic	Cal Rampton	226,956	56.99%	+9.65%
Republican	Mitchell Melich	171,300	43.01%	−9.65%
Total votes		398,256	100.00%	
Majority		55,656	13.97%	
Democratic gain from Republican		Swing	+19.30%	

=== Results by county ===
County	Cal Rampton Democratic		Mitchell Melich Republican		Margin		Total votes cast
County	#	%	#	%	#	%	Total votes cast
Beaver	1,159	58.68%	816	41.32%	343	17.37%	1,975
Box Elder	6,167	51.81%	5,735	48.19%	432	3.63%	11,902
Cache	7,840	48.98%	8,168	51.02%	-328	-2.05%	16,008
Carbon	5,161	66.65%	2,583	33.35%	2,578	33.29%	7,744
Daggett	155	55.76%	123	44.24%	32	11.51%	278
Davis	15,631	54.75%	12,917	45.25%	2,714	9.51%	28,548
Duchesne	1,307	51.42%	1,235	48.58%	72	2.83%	2,542
Emery	1,237	49.01%	1,287	50.99%	-50	-1.98%	2,524
Garfield	730	49.97%	731	50.03%	-1	-0.07%	1,461
Grand	639	28.21%	1,626	71.79%	-987	-43.58%	2,265
Iron	2,180	47.73%	2,387	52.27%	-207	-4.53%	4,567
Juab	1,271	56.97%	960	43.03%	311	13.94%	2,231
Kane	439	39.23%	680	60.77%	-241	-21.54%	1,119
Millard	1,506	44.00%	1,917	56.00%	-411	-12.01%	3,423
Morgan	814	57.98%	590	42.02%	224	15.95%	1,404
Piute	277	44.04%	352	55.96%	-75	-11.92%	629
Rich	357	47.22%	399	52.78%	-42	-5.56%	756
Salt Lake	105,947	58.58%	74,926	41.42%	31,021	17.15%	180,873
San Juan	919	40.20%	1,367	59.80%	-448	-19.60%	2,286
Sanpete	2,570	50.12%	2,558	49.88%	12	0.23%	5,128
Sevier	2,095	46.13%	2,447	53.87%	-352	-7.75%	4,542
Summit	1,515	53.72%	1,305	46.28%	210	7.45%	2,820
Tooele	5,245	68.23%	2,442	31.77%	2,803	36.46%	7,687
Uintah	2,099	46.28%	2,436	53.72%	-337	-7.43%	4,535
Utah	25,281	56.64%	19,350	43.36%	5,931	13.29%	44,631
Wasatch	1,422	55.31%	1,149	44.69%	273	10.62%	2,571
Washington	1,924	45.15%	2,337	54.85%	-413	-9.69%	4,261
Wayne	360	44.50%	449	55.50%	-89	-11.00%	809
Weber	30,709	63.01%	18,028	36.99%	12,681	26.02%	48,737
Total	226,956	56.99%	171,300	43.01%	55,656	13.97%	398,256

==== Counties that flipped from Republican to Democratic ====
- Box Elder
- Davis
- Duchesne
- Morgan
- Salt Lake
- Utah
- Wasatch
- Weber

==== Counties that flipped from Democratic to Republican ====
- Emery
- Garfield
- Millard
- Sevier
- Washington
- Wayne
