= George R. Hill III =

American chemist and religious leader

First Quorum of the Seventy
- April 4, 1987 (aged 65) – April 1, 1989 (aged 67)
- Called by: Ezra Taft Benson
- End reason: Transferred to Second Quorum of the Seventy

Second Quorum of the Seventy
- April 1, 1989 (aged 67) – October 2, 1992 (aged 70)
- Called by: Ezra Taft Benson
- End reason: Honorably released

Personal details
- Born: George Richard Hill III; November 24, 1921; Ogden, Utah, United States
- Died: April 22, 2001 (aged 79); Salt Lake City, Utah, United States

George Richard Hill III (November 24, 1921 – April 22, 2001) was an American chemist and a world authority on coal. Hill was also a general authority of the Church of Jesus Christ of Latter-day Saints (LDS Church) from 1987 to 1992.

== Early life ==
Hill was born in Ogden, Utah to George R. Hill Jr. and Elizabeth McKay. Both his parents were college deans at Utah State University. Hill's uncle was David O. McKay, ninth president of the LDS Church.

== Professional career ==
Hill earned a degree in chemistry from Brigham Young University (BYU) and went on to earn a doctorate at Cornell University in 1946. In 1951, the University of Utah invited Hill to start the school's Department of Fuels Engineering. From 1966 to 1972, Hill also served as the dean of the College of Mines and Mineral Industries at the University of Utah. In 1972, he was appointed the head of the Office of Coal Research in the United States Department of the Interior. Among other things while in this position Hill oversaw attempts to create plants converting coal into natural gas. His general focus was on trying to find alternative energy sources in the face of rising gas prices. In 1977, he returned to the University of Utah as the Envirotech Professor of Chemical Engineering. Hill published over one hundred papers in academic journals and was the recipient of the Henry H. Storch Award from by the American Chemical Society. He also received an honorary doctorate degree from BYU. Hill was a member of the National Academy of Engineering beginning in 1989.

== LDS Church service ==
In the LDS Church, prior to his call as a general authority, Hill was a bishop three times and a regional representative. From 1967 to 1971, Hill was a member of the general superintendency of the church's Young Men's Mutual Improvement Association, where he served under G. Carlos Smith and W. Jay Eldredge. In 1987, he became a member of the church's First Quorum of the Seventy. In 1989, he was transferred into the newly created Second Quorum of the Seventy, and held this position until he was released in 1992. During his tenure, Hill served in the presidencies of the church's Philippines/Micronesia and Utah South areas.

== Personal life ==
Hill had a lifelong involvement with the Boy Scouts of America and was awarded the Silver Buffalo Award from the Boy Scouts. He has also received the Silver Beaver and Silver Antelope awards.

Hill was married to Melba Parker and was the father of seven children. He died of cancer in Salt Lake City.

== See also ==
- Marvin J. Ashton
- George I. Cannon
