= Mitchell Melich =

American politician (1912–1999)

Mitchell Melich (1 February 1912 in Bingham Canyon, Salt Lake County, Utah – 12 June 1999) was Solicitor for the United States Department of the Interior under the first Richard Nixon administration.

== Biography ==
Melich was born in Bingham Canyon, Utah to parents who were immigrants from Serbia. In high school and college Melich worked as a copper miner in Bingham Canyon. He received a law degree from the University of Utah in 1934. That same year he moved to Moab, Utah. He worked as Moab attorney and also as Grand County, Utah attorney. He was elected to the Utah State Senate in 1942. He served in the state senate until 1950 and was the majority leader in 1949. In 1948 he ran unsuccessfully for United States Congress.

In 1952 he was involved with Charles Steen in founding Utex Exploration Co. He also was president of Uranium Reduction Co. from 1954 to 1962.

A lawyer and a member of the Republican Party, Melich ran for the Utah governorship in 1964, but lost to Democrat Cal Rampton.

While he was solicitor to the interior department Melich served for a short time as acting secretary of the interior after Walter J. Hickel was removed from office.

After his time with the interior department Melich moved to Salt Lake City where he worked as a lawyer with the law firm of Ray, Quinney and Nebeker.

Party political offices
Preceded by George Dewey Clyde	Republican nominee for Governor of Utah; 1964	Succeeded by Carl W. Buehner
