= Neil D. Schaerrer =

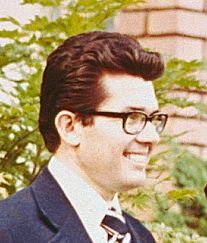
Neil D. Schaerrer as president of the Austria Vienna Mission of the Church of Jesus Christ of Latter-day Saints, June 1975

Neil Dean Schaerrer (April 12, 1930 – January 18, 1985) was the fourteenth general president of the Young Men organization of the Church of Jesus Christ of Latter-day Saints (LDS Church) from 1977 to 1979.

Born in Payson, Utah, Schaerrer served as a missionary for the church in Switzerland from 1950 to 1953. He was president of the church's Austria Vienna Mission from 1972 to 1975. In 1975, Schaerrer established the LDS Church as a legal entity in the Socialist Federal Republic of Yugoslavia.

In 1977, Schaerrer was called as the general president of the Young Men. There had not been a general president since Robert L. Backman was released in 1974 and the organization was placed under the direct supervision of the church's presiding bishopric. Schaerrer served for two years and was succeeded by Backman, who by then had become a church general authority, in 1979. Schaerrer was the last non-general authority to serve as president of the Young Men until Charles W. Dahlquist II was called in 2004. Schaerrer's counselors were Graham W. Doxey and Quinn G. McKay.

Schaerrer was married to Jane Coon and they were the parents of four children. He was an attorney by profession, and died in Salt Lake City at the age of 54.

The Church of Jesus Christ of Latter-day Saints titles
Vacant Organization under jurisdiction of the Presiding Bishopric Title last held by Robert L. Backman as President of the Aaronic Priesthood MIA Young Women	General President of the Young Men; 1977–1979	Succeeded by Robert L. Backman
