= George I. Cannon =

American religious leader

First Quorum of the Seventy
- April 6, 1986 – April 1, 1989
- Called by: Ezra Taft Benson
- End reason: Transferred to Second Quorum of the Seventy

Second Quorum of the Seventy
- April 1, 1989 – October 5, 1991
- Called by: Ezra Taft Benson
- End reason: Honorably released

Personal details
- Born: George Ivins Cannon; March 9, 1920; Salt Lake City, Utah, United States
- Died: August 4, 2009 (aged 89); Salt Lake City, Utah, United States

George Ivins Cannon (March 9, 1920 – August 4, 2009) was a general authority of the Church of Jesus Christ of Latter-day Saints (LDS Church) from 1986 to 1991.

Born in Salt Lake City, Utah, Cannon was the son of George J. Cannon and Lucy Grant Cannon, a leader of the youth in the LDS Church. His maternal grandfather was Heber J. Grant, the seventh president of the LDS Church. His paternal grandfather was Abraham H. Cannon, who was a member of the church's Quorum of the Twelve. Abraham was a son of George Q. Cannon, an early member of the church's First Presidency.

As a young man, Cannon served as a missionary in the church's Central States Mission. After his mission, he served in the United States Air Force during the Second World War. In 1946, he began attending Brigham Young University (BYU).

After graduating from BYU, Cannon became a vice president of Beneficial Life Insurance Company in Salt Lake City. He was active in the Boy Scouts of America and served in the organization's Great Salt Lake Council.

Prior to his call as a general authority, Cannon served in the church as a bishop, stake president, patriarch, temple sealer, and regional representative. He was also the president of the church's Central British Mission from 1966 to 1969. From 1969 to 1972, Cannon was an assistant and counselor to W. Jay Eldredge, the general superintendent of the Young Men's Mutual Improvement Association.

Cannon became a member of the First Quorum of the Seventy of the LDS Church in April 1986. In 1989, he was transferred to the newly created Second Quorum of the Seventy, where he served until being released as a general authority in 1991. Cannon later served as president of the Salt Lake Temple from 1993 to 1996.

Cannon was married to Isabel Hales and was the father of seven children. He died at his home in Salt Lake City at 89.

== See also ==
- George R. Hill III
- Robert L. Backman
