= Elbert R. Curtis =

American Mormon leader (1901–1975)

Elbert Raine Curtis (24 April 1901 – 20 May 1975) was the ninth general superintendent of the Young Men's Mutual Improvement Association of the Church of Jesus Christ of Latter-day Saints (LDS Church) from 1948 to 1958. He was succeeded in the leadership of the YMMIA by Joseph T. Bentley.

Born in Salt Lake City, Utah, Curtis was also a president of the Western States Mission of the LDS Church and a president of the Sugar House Stake of the church.

== Background ==
In 1971, Curtis was awarded the Silver Buffalo Award from the Boy Scouts of America for his efforts in integrating Scouting into the YMMIA of the LDS Church.

Curtis was married to Luceal Rockwood and was the father of three children. Curtis died in Salt Lake City.

== See also ==
- David S. King

The Church of Jesus Christ of Latter-day Saints titles
Preceded by George Q. Morris	Superintendent of the Young Men’s Mutual Improvement Association; 1948–1958	Succeeded by Joseph T. Bentley
