= George Q. Morris =

LDS Church figure

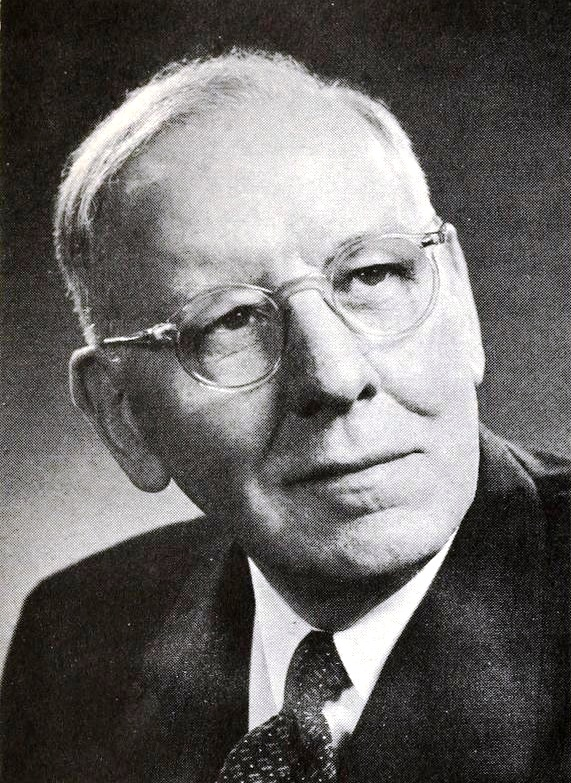

Quorum of the Twelve Apostles
- April 8, 1954 – April 23, 1962

LDS Church Apostle
- April 8, 1954 – April 23, 1962
- Reason: Death of Matthew Cowley
- Reorganization at end of term: N. Eldon Tanner ordained

Assistant to the Quorum of the Twelve Apostles
- October 6, 1951 – April 8, 1954
- End reason: Called to the Quorum of the Twelve Apostles

Personal details
- Born: George Quayle Morris; February 20, 1874; Salt Lake City, Utah Territory
- Died: April 23, 1962 (aged 88); Salt Lake City, Utah, U.S.
- Resting place: Salt Lake City Cemetery; 40°46′37.92″N 111°51′28.8″W
- Spouse(s): Emma Ramsey, 1905
- Children: Marian; Margery; Helen

George Quayle Morris (February 20, 1874 – April 23, 1962) was a member of the Quorum of the Twelve Apostles in the Church of Jesus Christ of Latter-day Saints (LDS Church) from 1954 until his death.

Morris was born in Salt Lake City, Utah Territory, to Elias Morris and Mary Lois Walker.

George Teasdale, a member of the Quorum of the Twelve Apostles, ordained George Q. Morris a Seventy on September 13, 1899. Morris was called on a mission to Great Britain in 1899, and served there until 1902. He was set apart as a president in the Second Quorum of Seventy August 19, 1904. He served as president of the Eastern States Mission from 1948 to 1951.

Morris married Emma Ramsey (1878–1964) on June 29, 1905; they had three daughters: Marian, Margery, and Helen.

Morris was a businessman. He was president of Elias Morris and Sons, a company involved in tile and gravestone production. He was president of Purdential Savings and Loan Association. He was heavily involved with the Boy Scouts as well.

From 1935 to 1937, Morris was the First Assistant to Albert E. Bowen, the Superintendent of the Young Men's Mutual Improvement Association (YMMIA). In 1937, when Bowen became a member of the Quorum of the Twelve Apostles, Morris succeeded him as YMMIA Superintendent. Morris held this position until 1948, when he was succeeded by Elbert R. Curtis.

Morris became a general authority of the LDS Church on October 6, 1951, when he was appointed an Assistant to the Quorum of the Twelve Apostles.

Morris was ordained an apostle and became a member of the Quorum of the Twelve Apostles on April 8, 1954, aged 80. He was selected and ordained by church president David O. McKay. Morris replaced Matthew Cowley in the Quorum, who had died the previous December. Morris was the oldest person in church history to become an apostle and a member of the Quorum of the Twelve.

Morris died on April 23, 1962, aged 88, in Salt Lake City. He was buried at Salt Lake City Cemetery. His vacancy in the Quorum of the Twelve was filled by N. Eldon Tanner.

Grave marker of George Q. Morris
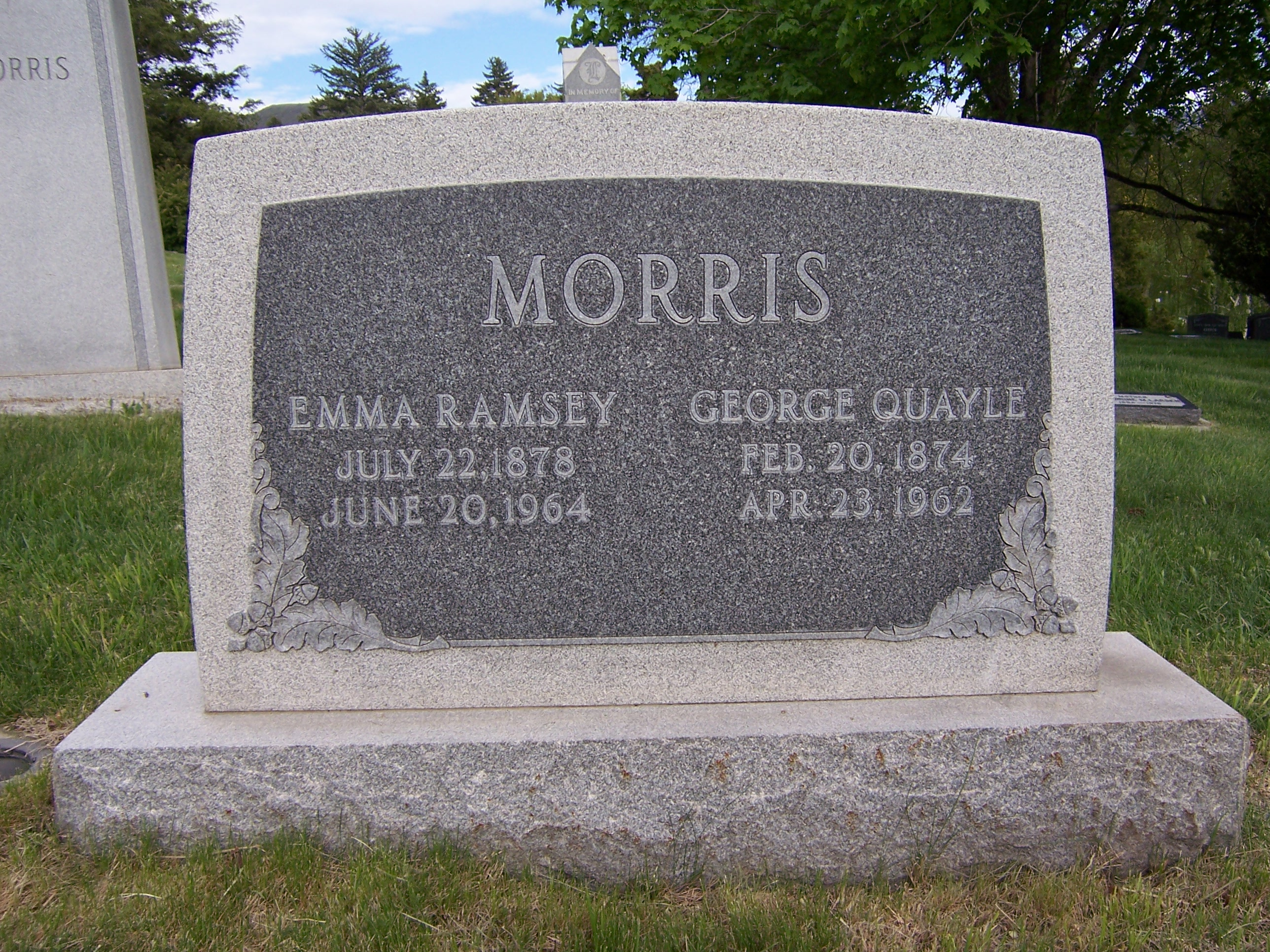
front side

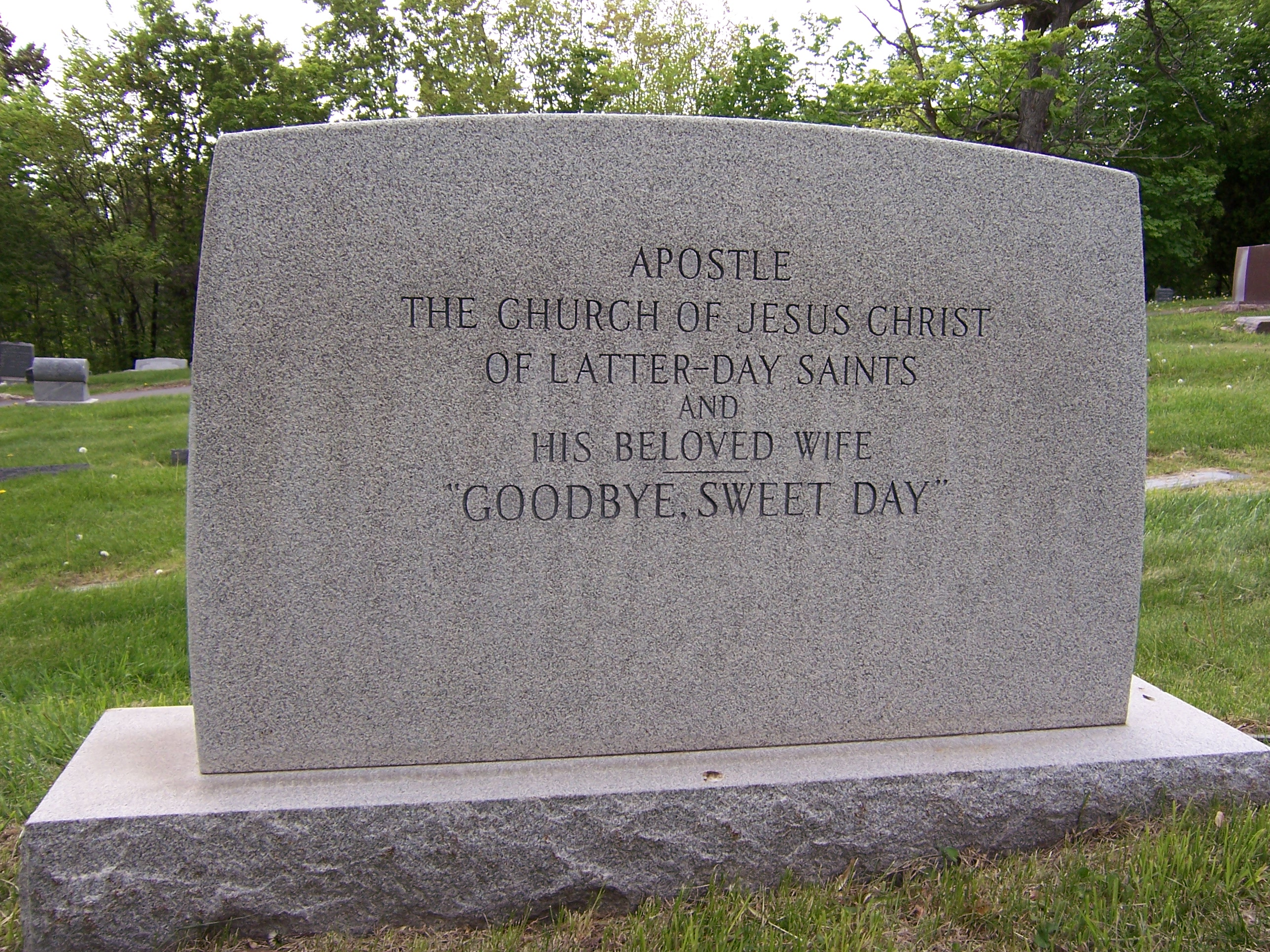
back side

The Church of Jesus Christ of Latter-day Saints titles
Preceded by Richard L. Evans	Quorum of the Twelve Apostles; April 8, 1954 – April 23, 1962	Succeeded by Hugh B. Brown
Preceded by Albert E. Bowen	Superintendent of the Young Men’s Mutual Improvement Association; 1937–1948	Succeeded by Elbert R. Curtis
