= Carl W. Buehner =

American Mormon leader (1898–1974)

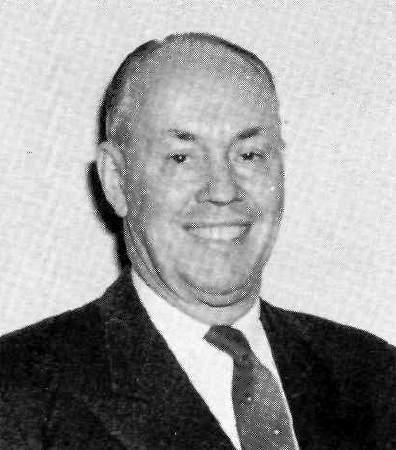

Second Assistant in the Young Men’s Mutual Improvement Association
- September 30, 1961 – 1967
- Called by: Joseph T. Bentley

Second Counselor in the Presiding Bishopric
- April 6, 1952 – September 30, 1961
- Called by: Joseph L. Wirthlin
- End reason: Honorable release of Joseph L. Withlin and his counselors

Personal details
- Born: Carl William Buehner; December 27, 1898; Stuttgart, Germany
- Died: November 11, 1974 (aged 75); Salt Lake City, Utah, United States
- Resting place: Wasatch Lawn Memorial Park; 40.698°N 111.842°W
- Spouse(s): Lucille Thurmon
- Children: 4
- Parents: Carl F. and Anna Buehner

Carl William Buehner (December 27, 1898 – November 11, 1974) was a German-American politician who was general authority of the Church of Jesus Christ of Latter-day Saints (LDS Church) from 1952 to 1961 and was the Republican Party candidate for governor of Utah in the 1968 election.

Buehner was born in Stuttgart, Germany. As a child, his family emigrated to Salt Lake City, Utah. Buehner was a graduate of the Illinois Institute of Technology in Chicago.

Prior to his call as a general authority, Buehner served in the LDS Church as a bishop and stake president and was a member of the Church Welfare Committee. In 1952, he was called as second counselor to the church's Presiding Bishop Joseph L. Wirthlin. He served in this capacity until 1961, when Wirthlin was succeeded by John H. Vandenburg.

Immediately following his release, Buehner was called as second assistant to Joseph T. Bentley in the general superintendency of the church's Young Men's Mutual Improvement Association. When Bentley was succeeded by G. Carlos Smith in 1962, Buehner again served as second assistant until 1967, when he was succeeded by George R. Hill III.

Buehner later served as a regional representative. He was also president of the Great Salt Lake Council of the Boy Scouts of America. He was awarded the Silver Beaver for his contribution to the Boy Scouts.

In 1968, Buehner was nominated by the Utah Republican Party as a candidate for the state governorship. Buehner was defeated easily by Democratic incumbent Cal Rampton.

Buehner died in Salt Lake City. He was married to Lucille Thurman and they were the parents of four children.

Buehner was quoted as saying, "They may forget what you said — but they will never forget how you made them feel." in Richard Evans' Quote Book, a 1971 compilation of quotations of prominent figures in the LDS church. This quote is often misattributed to many others including Maya Angelou.

== See also ==
- Thorpe B. Isaacson
- Marvin J. Ashton
- F. Enzio Busche

== Notes ==
Party political offices
Preceded by Mitchell Melich	Republican nominee for Governor of Utah; 1968	Succeeded by Nicholas L. Strike
The Church of Jesus Christ of Latter-day Saints titles
Preceded by Verl F. Scott	Second Assistant in the Young Men’s Mutual Improvement Association (Young Men); September 30, 1961 – 1967	Succeeded by George R. Hill III
Preceded by Thorpe B. Isaacson	Second Counselor in the Presiding Bishopric; April 6, 1952 – September 30, 1961	Succeeded by Victor L. Brown
