= 1956 Utah gubernatorial election =

- November 6, 1956
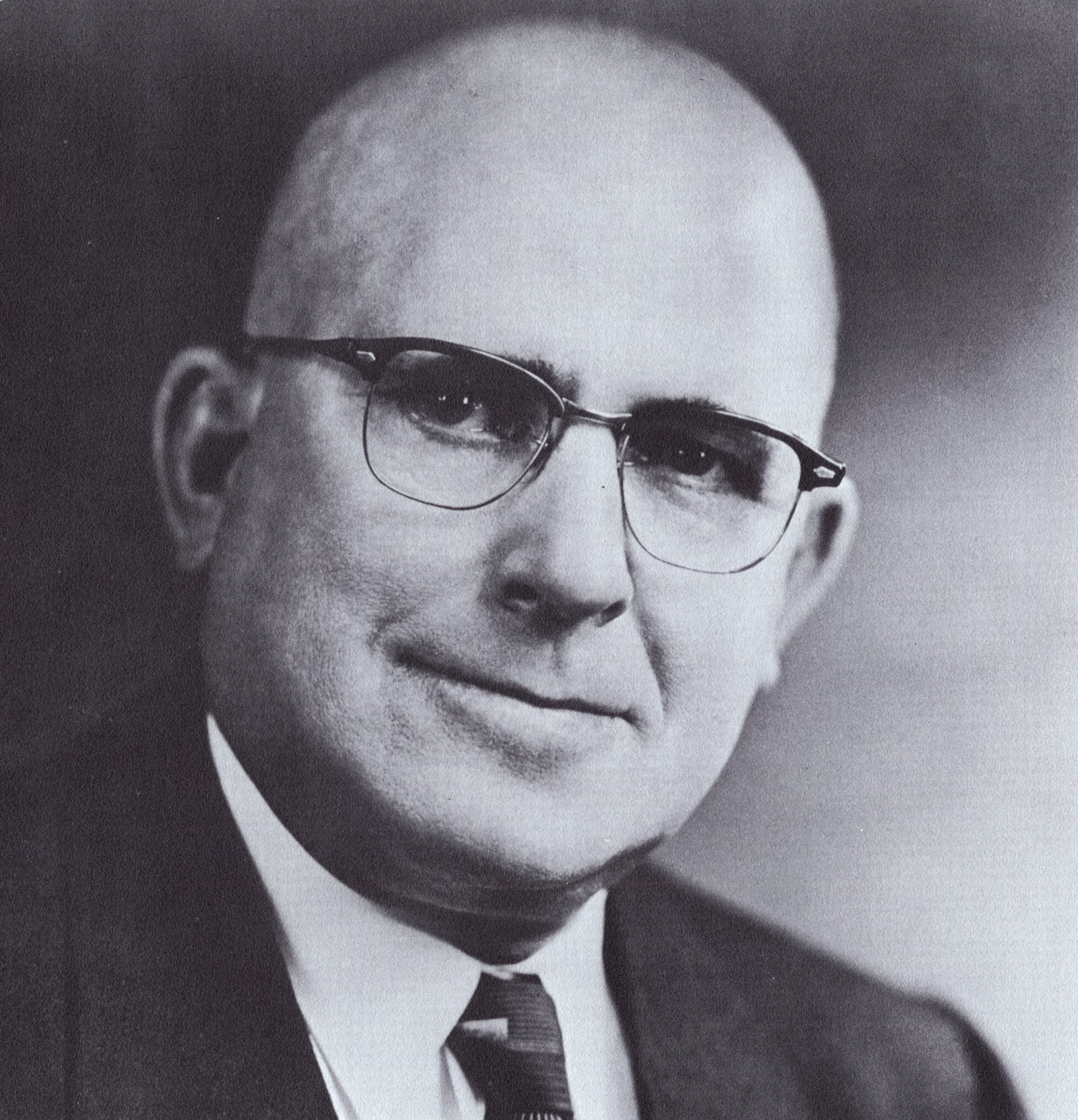

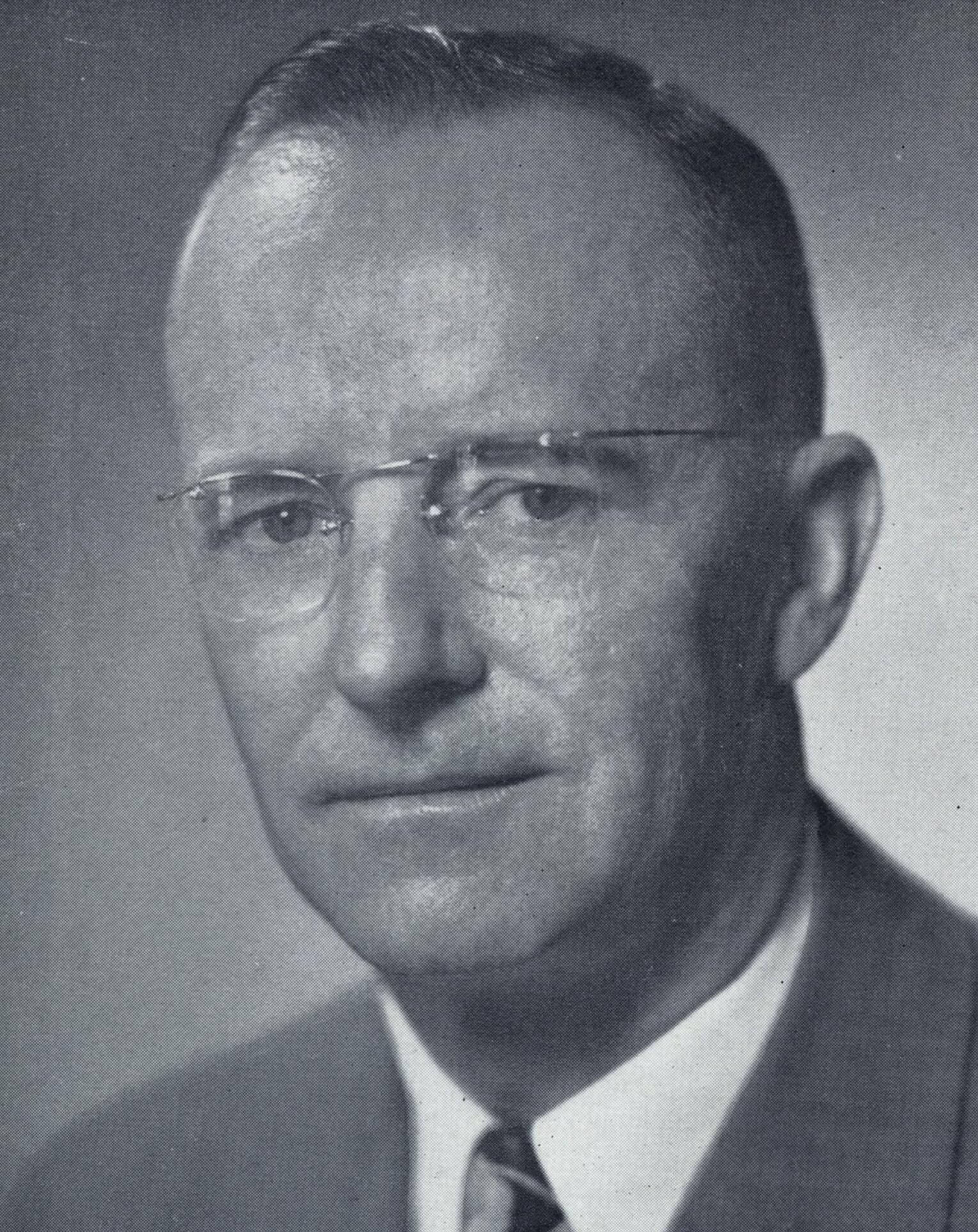
Nominee	George Dewey Clyde	L. C. Romney	J. Bracken Lee
Party	Republican	Democratic	Independent
Popular vote	127,164	111,297	94,428
Percentage	38.20%	33.43%	28.37%
- County results Clyde: 30–40% 40–50% 50–60% 60–70% 70–80% Romney: 30–40% 40–50% 50–60% Lee: 50–60%
Governor before election
J. Bracken Lee
Republican
Elected Governor
George Dewey Clyde
Republican

The 1956 Utah gubernatorial election was held on November 6, 1956. Republican nominee George Dewey Clyde defeated Democratic nominee L.C. "Rennie" Romney with 38.20% of the vote. As of 2026, this is the last time an incumbent Governor of Utah lost re-election.

== Primary election ==
Primary elections were held on September 11, 1956.

=== Republican primary ===
==== Candidates ====
- George Dewey Clyde, Director of the Utah Water and Power Board
- J. Bracken Lee, incumbent Governor

==== Results ====
Republican primary results
Party	Candidate	Votes	%
Republican	George Dewey Clyde	62,811	53.52%
Republican	J. Bracken Lee (inc.)	54,544	46.48%
Total votes		117,355	100.00%

=== Democratic primary ===
==== Candidates ====
- L. C. "Rennie" Romney, Salt Lake City Commissioner
- John S. Boyden

==== Results ====
Democratic primary results
Party	Candidate	Votes	%
Democratic	L. C. Romney	40,908	51.98%
Democratic	John S. Boyden	37,798	48.02%
Total votes		78,706	100.00%

== General election ==
=== Candidates ===
Major party candidates

- George Dewey Clyde, Republican
- L. C. "Rennie" Romney, Democratic

Other candidates

- J. Bracken Lee, Independent

=== Results ===
1956 Utah gubernatorial election
Party	Candidate	Votes	%	±%
Republican	George Dewey Clyde	127,164	38.20%	−16.88%
Democratic	L. C. Romney	111,297	33.43%	−11.48%
Independent	J. Bracken Lee (incumbent)	94,428	28.37%	
Total votes		332,889	100.00%	
Plurality		15,867	4.77%	
Republican hold		Swing	-5.40%	

=== Results by county ===
County	George Dewey Clyde Republican		L. C. Romney Democratic		J. Bracken Lee Independent		Margin		Total votes cast
County	#	%	#	%	#	%	#	%	Total votes cast
Beaver	702	31.69%	992	44.79%	521	23.52%	-290	-13.09%	2,215
Box Elder	3,603	42.49%	2,635	31.08%	2,241	26.43%	968	11.42%	8,479
Cache	8,028	57.35%	3,503	25.02%	2,468	17.63%	4,525	32.32%	13,999
Carbon	992	11.10%	4,397	49.21%	3,547	39.69%	-850 (Note: Romney's margin over Lee)	-9.51%	8,936
Daggett	63	32.81%	102	53.13%	27	14.06%	-39	-20.31%	192
Davis	7,527	41.75%	5,919	32.83%	4,583	25.42%	1,608	8.92%	18,029
Duchesne	1,156	42.88%	808	29.97%	732	27.15%	348	12.91%	2,696
Emery	779	29.63%	942	35.83%	908	34.54%	-34	-1.29%	2,629
Garfield	748	51.09%	456	31.15%	260	17.76%	292	19.95%	1,464
Grand	350	25.75%	260	19.13%	749	55.11%	-399	-29.36%	1,359
Iron	2,086	45.22%	1,255	27.21%	1,272	27.57%	814 (Note: Clyde's margin over Lee)	17.65%	4,613
Juab	1,025	40.34%	1,012	39.83%	504	19.83%	13	0.51%	2,541
Kane	748	72.69%	108	10.50%	173	16.81%	575	55.88%	1,029
Millard	1,645	42.76%	1,173	30.49%	1,029	26.75%	472	12.27%	3,847
Morgan	592	44.05%	461	34.30%	291	21.65%	131	9.75%	1,344
Piute	390	54.32%	194	27.02%	134	18.66%	196	27.30%	718
Rich	433	53.13%	206	25.28%	176	21.60%	227	27.85%	815
Salt Lake	51,199	34.67%	47,593	32.23%	48,872	33.10%	2,327	1.58%	147,664
San Juan	850	55.52%	469	30.63%	212	13.85%	381	24.89%	1,531
Sanpete	2,807	49.50%	1,713	30.21%	1,151	20.30%	1,094	19.29%	5,671
Sevier	2,185	44.78%	1,103	22.61%	1,591	32.61%	594	12.17%	4,879
Summit	1,168	40.19%	977	33.62%	761	26.19%	191	6.57%	2,906
Tooele	1,828	30.17%	2,490	41.09%	1,742	28.75%	-662	-10.92%	6,060
Uintah	1,875	51.22%	742	20.27%	1,044	28.52%	831	22.70%	3,661
Utah	17,115	44.93%	12,868	33.78%	8,107	21.28%	4,247	11.15%	38,090
Wasatch	1,112	42.98%	948	36.64%	527	20.37%	164	6.34%	2,587
Washington	2,436	60.58%	909	22.61%	676	16.81%	1,527	37.98%	4,021
Wayne	319	41.11%	296	38.14%	161	20.75%	23	2.96%	776
Weber	13,403	33.39%	16,766	41.77%	9,969	24.84%	-3,363	-8.38%	40,138
Total	127,164	38.20%	111,297	33.43%	94,428	28.37%	15,867	4.77%	332,889

==== Counties that flipped from Republican to Democratic ====
- Beaver
- Emery

==== Counties that flipped from Republican to Independent ====
- Grand
