= Robert L. Backman =

American religious leader and politician (1922–2022)

Emeritus General Authority
- October 3, 1992 – June 3, 2022

Presidency of the Seventy
- October 6, 1985 – August 15, 1992
- End reason: Honorably released

General President of the Young Men
- 1979 – October 6, 1985

First Quorum of the Seventy
- April 1, 1978 – October 3, 1992
- End reason: Granted general authority emeritus status

General President of the Aaronic Priesthood MIA Young Women
- November 1972 – 1974

Personal details
- Born: Robert LeGrand Backman; March 22, 1922; Salt Lake City, Utah, U.S.
- Died: June 3, 2022 (aged 100); Murray, Utah, U.S.
- Spouse(s): Virginia Pickett (m. 1941; died 1999); Janet Woodbury
- Children: 7

Robert LeGrand Backman (March 22, 1922 – June 3, 2022) was an American lawyer and politician in the state of Utah who was a general authority of the Church of Jesus Christ of Latter-day Saints (LDS Church) from 1978 until his death.

== Early life ==
Backman was born in Salt Lake City, Utah, but spent much of his youth in South Africa, where his father, LeGrand Backman, was president of the LDS Church's South African Mission. After returning to Utah for his last year of high school, Backman later served as a missionary in the church's Northern States Mission, headquartered in Chicago, Illinois. Backman served in the U.S. Army in the Philippines during the Second World War. Following the war, he enrolled at the law school at the University of Utah. He was a member of the Utah House of Representatives for two term as a Republican.

== LDS Church service ==
Before his call as a general authority, Backman served as president of the church's Northwestern States Mission, based in Portland, Oregon, as a temple sealer, and as a regional representative. In 1972, he was briefly the second assistant to W. Jay Eldredge, the general superintendent of the Young Men's Mutual Improvement Association (YMMIA). When the YMMIA was renamed the Aaronic Priesthood–MIA in 1972, Backman was called as its general president. He served in this calling until 1974, when the Aaronic Priesthood–MIA was placed under the direct supervision of the church's presiding bishopric. In 1978, Backman became a member of the church's First Quorum of the Seventy. In 1979, he succeeded Neil D. Schaerrer as the general president of the Young Men organization. Backman is the only man to serve two non-consecutive terms as the general president of the Young Men.

In 1985, Backman was released from the Young Men and became a member of the seven-man Presidency of the Seventy, with Vaughn J. Featherstone succeeding him as president of the Young Men. Backman served in the Presidency of the Seventy until August 1992; in October of that year, he was designated an emeritus general authority.

In 1986, Backman was awarded the Silver Buffalo Award from the Boy Scouts of America for his efforts in incorporating Scouting into the LDS Church's Young Men organization. From 2005 to 2008, Backman was president of the church's Jordan River Utah Temple.

== Personal life and death ==
Backman married Virginia Pickett on July 5, 1941 in the Salt Lake Temple and they had seven daughters; she died on June 4, 1999. He later married Janet Woodbury.

Backman turned 100 on March 22, 2022 and died on June 3 in Murray, Utah.

== See also ==
- George I. Cannon: a fellow counselor of Eldredge's at the time of Backman's service
- "Elder Jack H Goaslind, Elder Robert L. Backman of the Presidency of the First Quorum of the Seventy", Ensign, November 1985, p. 100

The Church of Jesus Christ of Latter-day Saints titles
Preceded by Neil D. Schaerrer	General President of the Young Men; 1979–October 6, 1985	Succeeded by Vaughn J Featherstone
Preceded by W. Jay Eldredge as Superintendent of the Young Men’s Mutual Improvement Association	General President of the Aaronic Priesthood MIA Young Women; November 1972–1974	Vacant Organization under jurisdiction of the Presiding Bishopric Title next held by Neil D. Schaerrer as General President of the Young Men
