= Joseph T. Bentley =

Joseph Taylor Bentley

Personal life
- Born: March 6, 1906 Colonia Juárez, Chihuahua, Mexico
- Died: June 16, 1993
- Spouse: Kathleen Bench (m. 1928)
- Education: Brigham Young University
- Occupation: Educator; LDS Church leader

Religious life
- Religion: Christianity
- Denomination: The Church of Jesus Christ of Latter-day Saints

Joseph Taylor Bentley (6 March 1906 – 16 June 1993) was the tenth general superintendent of the Young Men's Mutual Improvement Association of the Church of Jesus Christ of Latter-day Saints (LDS Church) from 1958 to 1962.

Born in Colonia Juárez, Chihuahua, Mexico, Bentley graduated from Brigham Young University and worked as a teacher and educational administrator in the U.S. state of Utah and Mexico. In 1953, he began teaching in the accounting department at BYU and eventually became an assistant to Ernest L. Wilkinson, the president of the university.

In 1956, Bentley became the first president of the Northern Mexican Mission of the LDS Church, which was created by dividing the Mexican Mission.

In 1958, Bentley succeeded Elbert R. Curtis and became general superintendent of the LDS Church's YMMIA. He served for four years, until he was succeeded in 1962 by his first assistant G. Carlos Smith. Bentley's other assistants during his tenure included Carl W. Buehner and future LDS Church apostles Alvin R. Dyer and Marvin J. Ashton.

In 1972, Bentley was appointed the president of the newly created Argentina East Mission, which was created by dividing Argentina into two missions. In 1976 Bentley was called as first counselor in the Provo Temple presidency.

Bentley married to Kathleen Bench in the Salt Lake Temple in 1928. Bench died in 1998, four years after Bentley.

== Notes ==
The Church of Jesus Christ of Latter-day Saints titles
Preceded by Elbert R. Curtis	Superintendent of the Young Men’s Mutual Improvement Association; 1958–1962	Succeeded by G. Carlos Smith
