= Matthew Cowley =

American religious leader and missionary (1897–1953)

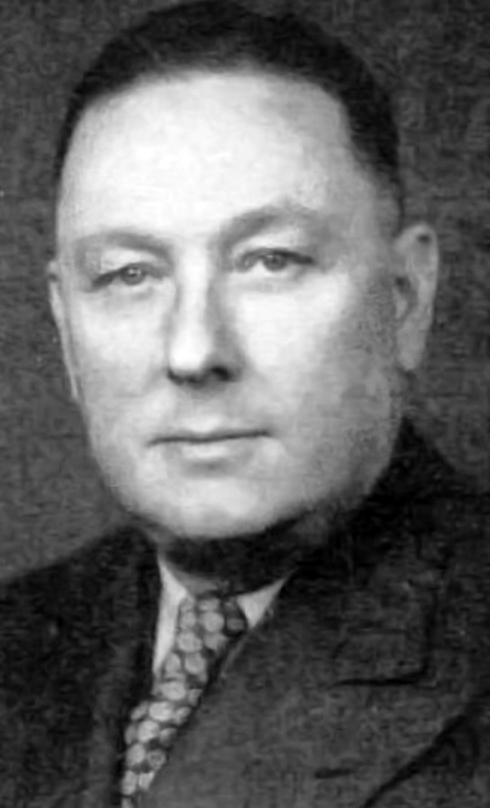

Quorum of the Twelve Apostles
- October 11, 1945 – December 13, 1953

Apostle
- October 11, 1945 – December 13, 1953
- Reason: Death of Heber J. Grant and reorganization of First Presidency
- Reorganization at end of term: George Q. Morris ordained

Personal details
- Born: August 2, 1897; Preston, Idaho, United States
- Died: December 13, 1953 (aged 56); Los Angeles, California, United States
- Resting place: Salt Lake City Cemetery; 40°46′37.92″N 111°51′28.8″W
- Spouse(s): Elva E. Taylor
- Children: Jewell C. Sheffield; Duncan Nopera Meha Cowley (Toni)
- Parents: Matthias F. Cowley; Abbie Hyde
- Relatives: Samuel P. Cowley (half-brother)

Matthew Cowley (August 2, 1897 – December 13, 1953) was an American missionary in New Zealand and then served as a member of the Quorum of the Twelve Apostles of the Church of Jesus Christ of Latter-day Saints (LDS Church) from 1945 until his death.

== Early life ==
Cowley was the son of Matthias F. Cowley and Abbie Hyde. He was also the half-brother of FBI agent Samuel P. Cowley. He was born August 2, 1897, in Preston, Idaho. That same year, Cowley's father was called to the Quorum of the Twelve Apostles and the family moved to Salt Lake City, Utah. Matthew spent his childhood going to school and working on farms in the summer. He had a good sense of humor and enjoyed joking around. When Matthew was eight years old, his father resigned from the Quorum of the Twelve Apostles.

Cowley attended Latter-day Saints University in Salt Lake City. He was called as a missionary during his sophomore year in 1914.

== Missionary service and career ==
In 1914, the 17-year-old Cowley became an LDS Church missionary. His original assignment was to serve in Hawaii, like his older brothers. However, his assignment was changed, and he went to New Zealand instead. There, he developed an unusual talent with the Māori language and a love of the Māori people. He revised the Māori translation of the Book of Mormon, which was then published in 1917. He also translated the Doctrine and Covenants and the Pearl of Great Price into Māori, with the assistance of Wiremu Duncan and Stuart Meha. The translated version of these scriptural texts was published in 1919. His mission was extended to five years to complete these tasks. He returned from his mission to Salt Lake City in 1919; however, he continued to write letters to the Māori people throughout his life, and would later return to New Zealand.

After returning from his mission, Cowley attended the University of Utah for 2 years. After graduating he went to George Washington University Law School in Washington D.C. Cowley stayed in Washington, D.C., for 4 years, where he worked as an assistant to United States Senator Reed Smoot. He married Elva Eleanor Taylor in the Salt Lake Temple on July 13, 1922. After their wedding, they returned together to Washington, D.C. They had one daughter, Jewell.

While in Washington, D.C., Cowley was appointed Sunday School Superintendent in the local congregation, but was forced to resign due to his rigorous studies. Upon graduation, he returned to Salt Lake City, where he gained admission to the Utah State Bar Association in 1925. Afterwards, Cowley started his own law practice in Salt Lake City. He gave up his practice for a brief time from 1926 to 1928, when he served as Assistant County Attorney.

In 1938, Cowley was called to serve as president of the church's New Zealand Mission. He directed the affairs of the missionaries in New Zealand and oversaw church proceedings in the area. The mission included around 60 missionaries and 9,000 church members at the time, and Cowley was able to visit with many of the people he had met on his first mission. As World War II began, the church called the missionaries serving overseas back home to the United States, but Cowley and his family remained in New Zealand throughout the war. He was affectionately called tumuaki, meaning president, by the Māori members of the church. During his service, he adopted a Māori baby boy, Duncan Nopera Meha Cowley (Toni). Cowley was known by both members and non-members alike for his dedication to the Māori people. He returned home in 1945.

== Apostle ==
Cowley was released as mission president in September 1945. In the church's general conference the following month, he was called to serve as an apostle and member of the Quorum of the Twelve Apostles, filling the vacancy caused by the death of church president Heber J. Grant. Cowley was ordained an apostle on October 11, 1945, by new church president George Albert Smith.

As an apostle, Cowley visited various church missions throughout the world, spoke in many conferences, and helped direct other church affairs. A few months later, in March 1946, he suffered a heart attack. Although he recovered enough to resume his church assignments, he was never as "robust in health" as before. In December 1946, Cowley was assigned as president of the church's Pacific Missions, a newly created position in which he oversaw several missions, including the Hawaiian, Central Pacific, Samoan, Tongan, Tahitian, Australian and New Zealand missions.

Cowley was known for being compassionate. He encouraged members of the church to openly welcome sinners rather than ostracize them. Cowley was also known for being an eloquent speaker and writer. A number of his sermons were compiled into Matthew Cowley Speaks, which was published after his death.

== Death ==
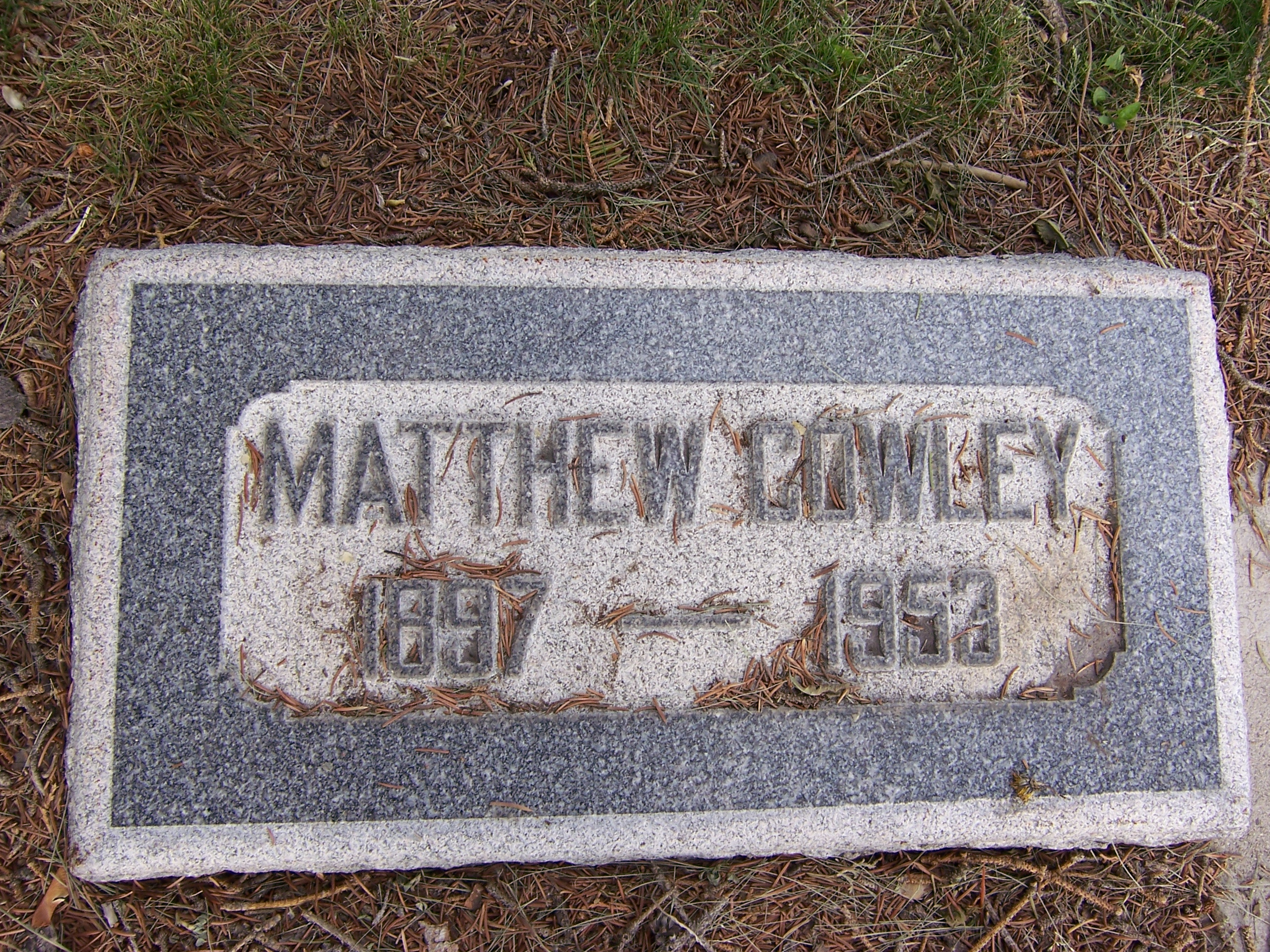
Matthew Cowley's Headstone

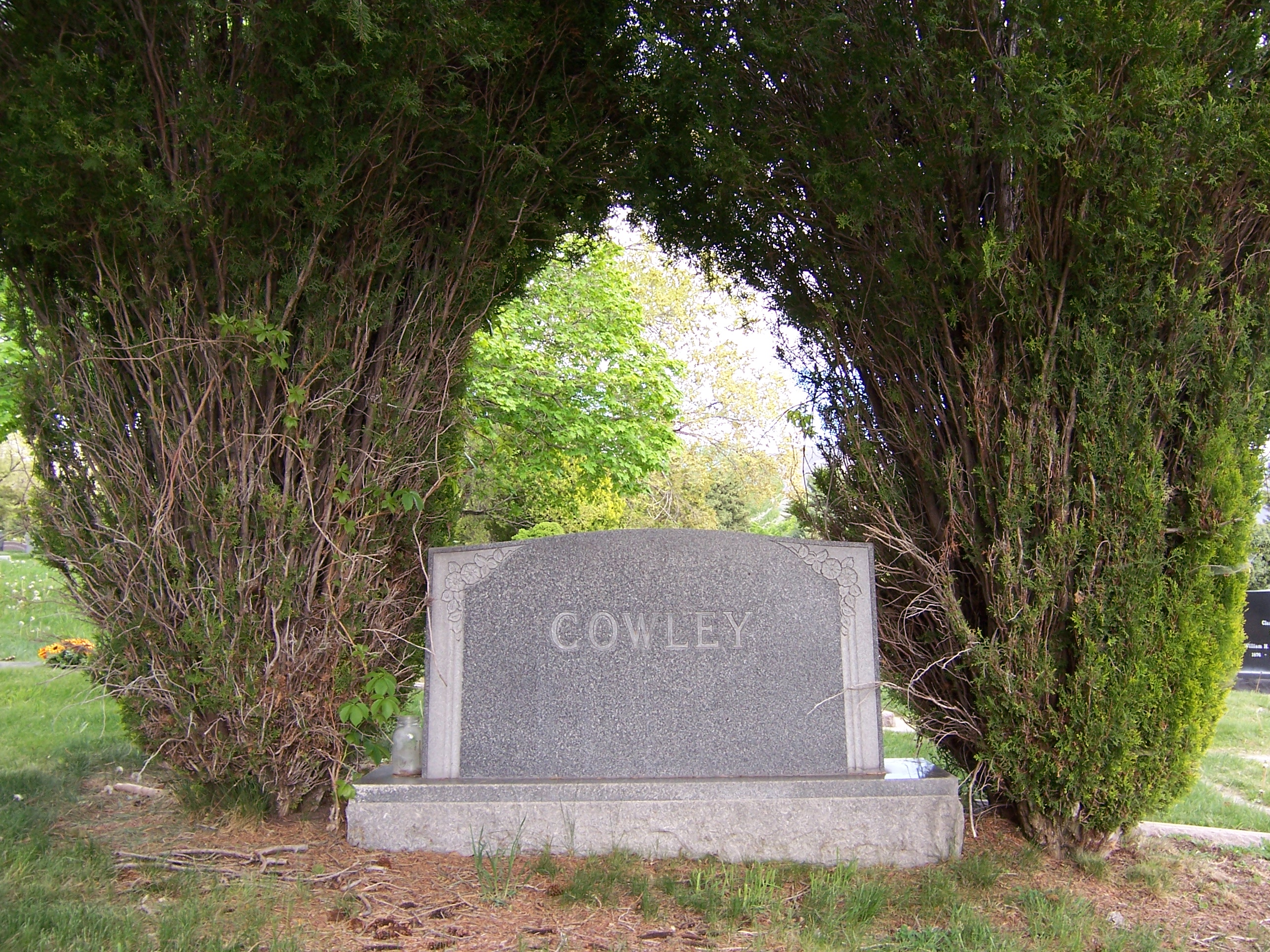
Cowley Family Monument

Cowley died unexpectedly in Los Angeles, California on December 13, 1953, while visiting to attend services for the newly built Los Angeles Temple. He was buried in the Salt Lake City Cemetery. George Q. Morris was called to fill the vacancy in the Quorum of the Twelve Apostles.

== Published works ==
- Cowley, Matthew (1954). Matthew Cowley speaks: Discourses of Elder Matthew Cowley of the Quorum of the Twelve of the Church of Jesus Christ of Latter-day Saints. Deseret Book Company.
- Cowley, Matthew (1946). Religion and moral reconstruction: Address delivered Sunday, January 6, 1946, at 9 p.m. over Radio station KSL. s.n. ISBN B0007J4GLS.

== Biography ==
- Smith, Henry A. (1954). Matthew Cowley Man of Faith. Bookcraft.

== See also ==
- Paora Te Potangaroa

== External resources ==
- Te Ara Encyclopedia of New Zealand Biography
- Collections related to Matthew and Elva T. Cowley in the L. Tom Perry Special Collections, Harold B. Lee Library, Brigham Young University

The Church of Jesus Christ of Latter-day Saints titles
Preceded by Mark E. Petersen	Quorum of the Twelve Apostles; October 11, 1945 – December 13, 1953	Succeeded by Henry D. Moyle
