= 1972 Utah gubernatorial election =

- November 7, 1972
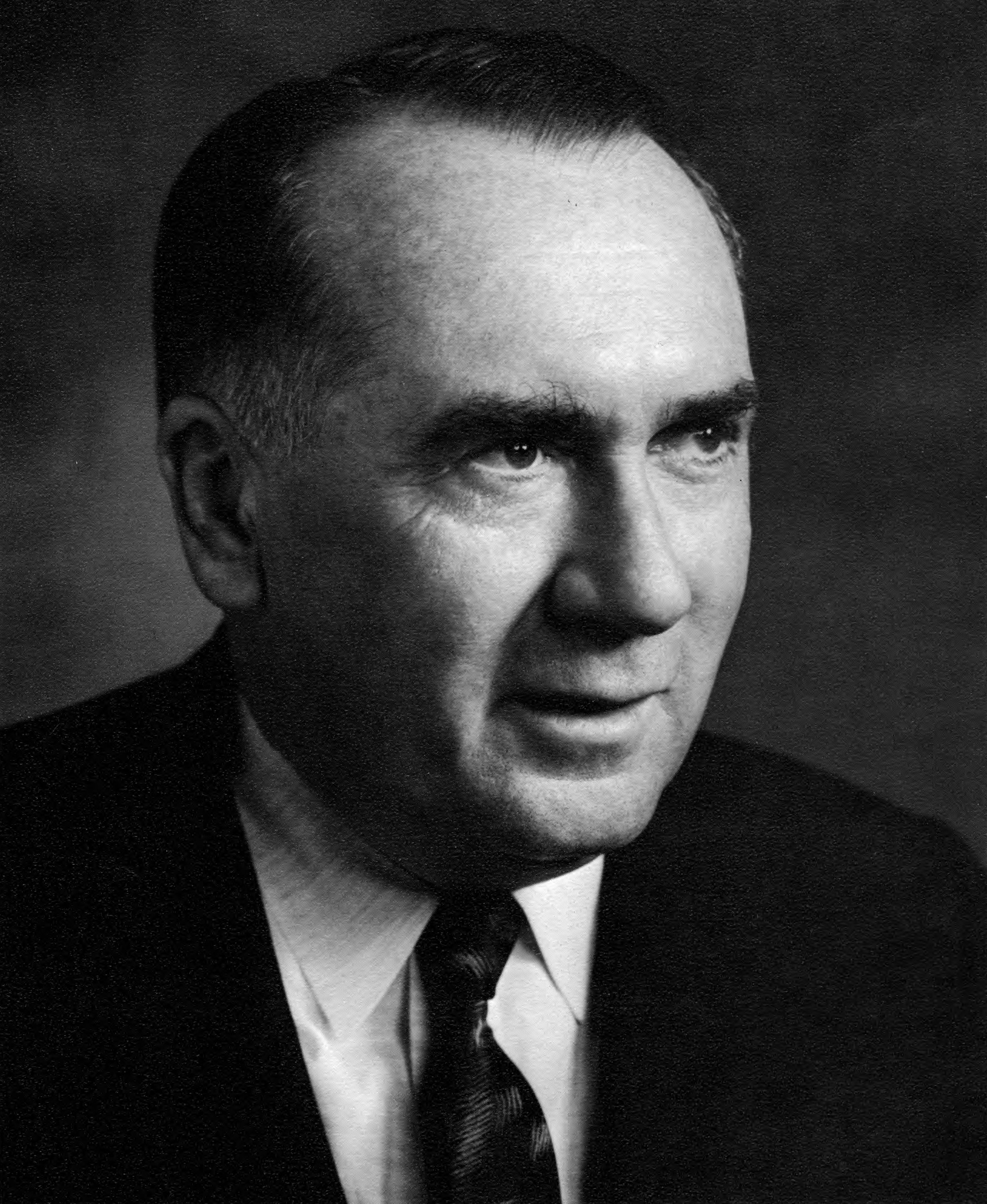

Nominee	Cal Rampton	Nicholas L. Strike
Party	Democratic	Republican
Popular vote	331,998	144,449
Percentage	69.68%	30.32%
- County results Rampton: 50–60% 60–70% 70–80% Strike: 50–60%
Governor before election
Cal Rampton
Democratic
Elected Governor
Cal Rampton
Democratic

The 1972 Utah gubernatorial election was held on November 7, 1972. Democratic incumbent Cal Rampton defeated Republican nominee Nicholas L. Strike with 69.68% of the vote. Rampton's victory was despite incumbent Republican president Richard Nixon winning the state with over 67% of the vote in the concurrent presidential election. The election made Rampton the first governor to serve three terms.

Rampton's vote share is the highest ever achieved by a Democratic gubernatorial candidate in Utah. It remained the highest share by a gubernatorial candidate from any party in the state until 1996. Rampton flipped Kane County, which had previously never voted Democratic for governor (though it had voted Democratic for president in 1916), but Strike managed to simultaneously flip Uintah County, preventing a statewide sweep by Rampton.

== Primary election ==
Primary elections were held on September 12, 1972.

=== Democratic primary ===
Incumbent governor Cal Rampton was renominated without opposition.

=== Republican primary ===
Nicholas L. Strike, a former Navy officer and president of the Utah Manufacturer's Association from 1968 to 1969, was nominated without opposition.

== Campaign ==
It was suggested that Rampton, as a moderate Democrat, was acceptable enough to Utah's Republican Party that in both the 1968 and 1972 elections, they put forward only token candidates. By October 1972, Rampton was seen as very likely to win, with his election appearing "assured" according to The New York Times.

== General election ==
=== Candidates ===
- Cal Rampton, Democratic
- Nicholas L. Strike, Republican

=== Results ===
1972 Utah gubernatorial election
Party	Candidate	Votes	%	±%
Democratic	Cal Rampton (incumbent)	331,998	69.68%	+0.97%
Republican	Nicholas L. Strike	144,449	30.32%	−0.97%
Total votes		476,447	100.00%	
Majority		187,549	39.36%	
Democratic hold		Swing	+1.94%	

=== Results by county ===
County	Cal Rampton "Democratic"		Nicholas L. Strike Republican		Margin		Total votes cast
County	#	%	#	%	#	%	Total votes cast
Beaver	1,365	65.78%	710	34.22%	655	31.57%	2,075
Box Elder	8,233	64.28%	4,575	35.72%	3,658	28.56%	12,808
Cache	13,306	62.04%	8,141	37.96%	5,165	24.08%	21,447
Carbon	5,789	77.32%	1,698	22.68%	4,091	54.64%	7,487
Daggett	164	58.36%	117	41.64%	47	16.73%	281
Davis	28,768	70.48%	12,048	29.52%	16,720	40.96%	40,816
Duchesne	1,779	57.55%	1,312	42.45%	467	15.11%	3,091
Emery	1,763	68.92%	795	31.08%	968	37.84%	2,558
Garfield	825	51.69%	771	48.31%	54	3.38%	1,596
Grand	1,576	61.78%	975	38.22%	601	23.56%	2,551
Iron	4,290	64.43%	2,368	35.57%	1,922	28.87%	6,658
Juab	1,558	64.12%	872	35.88%	686	28.23%	2,430
Kane	803	56.11%	628	43.89%	175	12.23%	1,431
Millard	2,318	60.74%	1,498	39.26%	820	21.49%	3,816
Morgan	1,300	63.82%	737	36.18%	563	27.64%	2,037
Piute	359	60.85%	231	39.15%	128	21.69%	590
Rich	408	53.19%	359	46.81%	49	6.39%	767
Salt Lake	154,197	73.48%	55,645	26.52%	98,552	46.96%	209,842
San Juan	1,524	59.84%	1,023	40.16%	501	19.67%	2,547
Sanpete	3,620	64.10%	2,027	35.90%	1,593	28.21%	5,647
Sevier	3,059	71.91%	1,195	28.09%	1,864	43.82%	4,254
Summit	2,009	63.64%	1,148	36.36%	861	27.27%	3,157
Tooele	6,769	78.51%	1,853	21.49%	4,916	57.02%	8,622
Uintah	2,352	48.15%	2,533	51.85%	-181	-3.71%	4,885
Utah	38,628	65.61%	20,243	34.39%	18,385	31.23%	58,871
Wasatch	1,853	63.39%	1,070	36.61%	783	26.79%	2,923
Washington	3,851	58.19%	2,767	41.81%	1,084	16.38%	6,618
Wayne	516	62.09%	315	37.91%	201	24.19%	831
Weber	39,016	69.91%	16,795	30.09%	22,221	39.81%	55,811
Total	331,998	69.68%	144,449	30.32%	187,549	39.36%	476,447

==== Counties that flipped from Republican to Democratic ====
- Kane

==== Counties that flipped from Democratic to Republican ====
- Uintah
