= Lucybeth Rampton =

American politician (1914–2004)

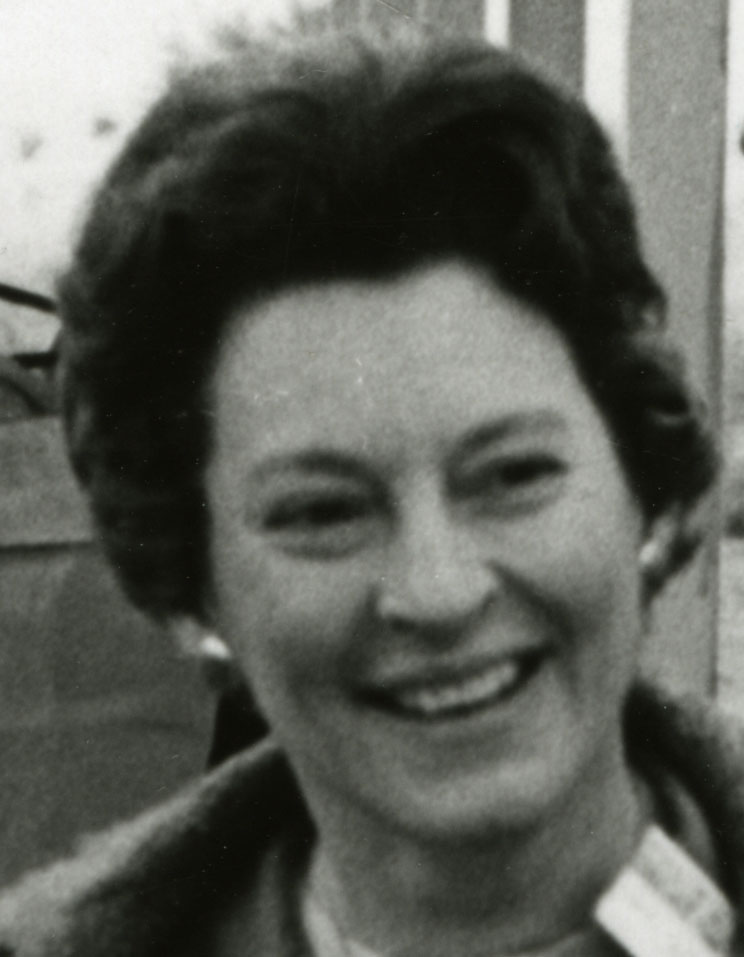
- Rampton in 1967

First Lady of Utah
- In role January 4, 1965 – January 3, 1977
- Governor: Cal Rampton
- Preceded by: Ora Packard
- Succeeded by: Norma Matheson

Personal details
- Born: Lucy Elizabeth Cardon; August 10, 1914 Washington, D.C., U.S.
- Died: January 23, 2004 (aged 89) Millcreek, Utah, U.S.
- Spouse: Cal Rampton (m. 1940)
- Relations: Anthony W. Ivins (grandfather); Erastus Snow (great-grandfather)
- Parent(s): Phillip Vincent Cardon; Leah Ivins

Lucy Elizabeth Cardon Rampton (August 10, 1914 – January 23, 2004) was an American educator and political figure. She served as the first lady of Utah from 1965 to 1977, as wife of Governor Cal Rampton. She was public about her own struggles with depression, and promoted mental health awareness.

== Early life and education ==
Rampton was born in Washington, D.C., the daughter of Phillip Vincent Cardon and Leah Ivins. Her father, an agricultural scientist, was at the time in the first of two extended stints with the US Department of Agriculture. In between, he also taught at Montana State University, was director of the Branch Agricultural College in Utah (predecessor of Southern Utah University), and at the end of his career became Director General of the Food and Agriculture Organization (FAO) of the United Nations. Rampton's maternal grandfather was Anthony W. Ivins, and her great-grandfather was Erastus Snow, both Mormon leaders.

Rampton attended school in Logan, Utah. She earned a bachelor's degree from Utah State University in Logan in 1936, and was active in the university's little theatre program. She earned a master's in anthropology at the University of Utah, with a 1962 master's thesis was titled "An examination of the Mississippian culture". Utah State University awarded her an honorary doctorate in 1973.

== Career ==
Rampton taught for two years at Westminster College in Salt Lake City. She was First Lady of Utah from 1965 to 1977. She reviewed books for the Utah Historical Quarterly. In 1968 she received the first Lifetime Achievement Award from the Utah Heritage Foundation; the award was named for her in 1994, and from Southern Utah State College in 1985. In the 1990s she spoke against homophobia in Utah.

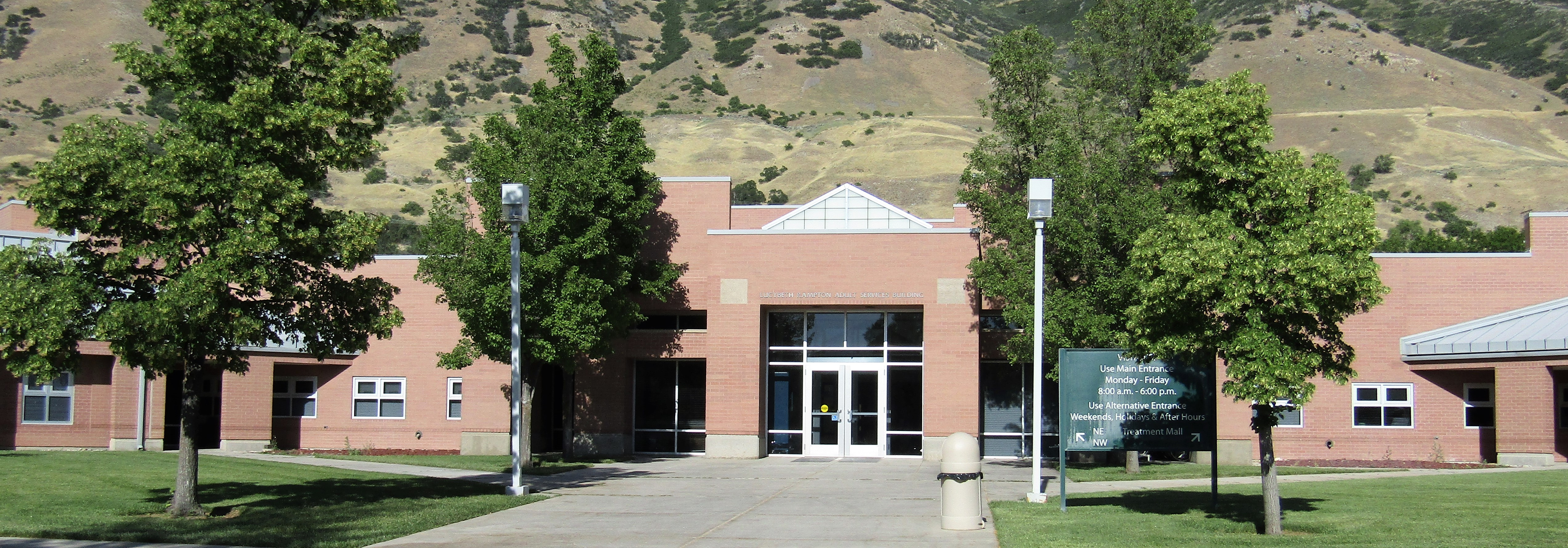
The Lucybeth Rampton Adult Services Building at Utah State Hospital

Rampton suffered from severe depression and, as First Lady, she spoke publicly about her experiences, including hospitalization, medication, and electroconvulsive therapy (ECT). She advocated for mental health awareness and improved services. In recognition of her efforts to raise awareness, a new residential building at the Utah State Hospital was named in her honor in 2003.

== Publications ==
- "Mother's Day, 1971" (1971, Dialogues)

== Personal life ==
Cardon met Calvin L. Rampton on a blind date in Washington, D.C. They married on March 10, 1940, and had four children. Their daughter Margaret died in 1986, from cancer. On January 21, 2004, she suffered a heart attack at her home, and died two days later at St. Mark's Hospital in Millcreek, Utah, aged 89.
