= 1968 Utah gubernatorial election =

- November 5, 1968
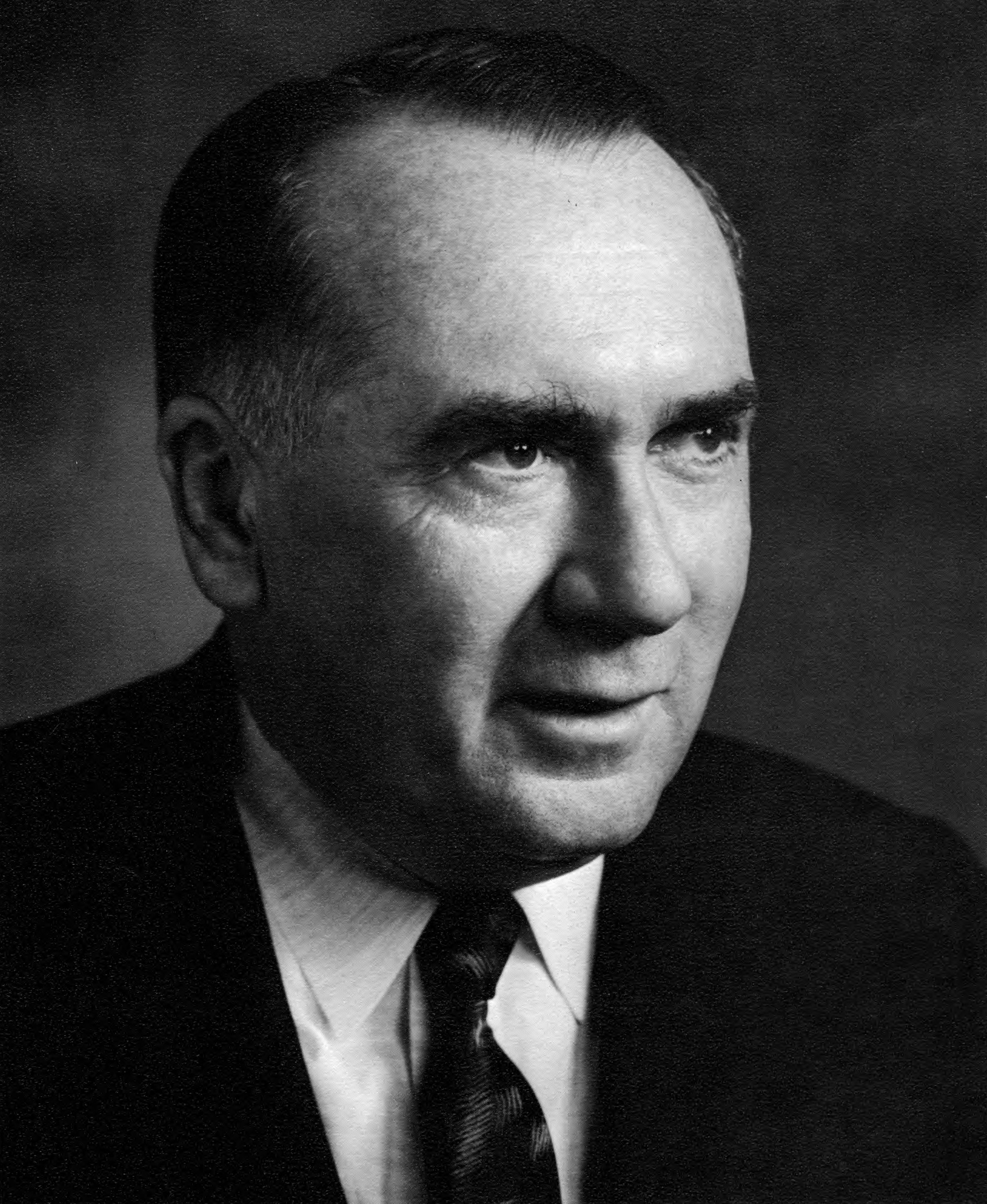

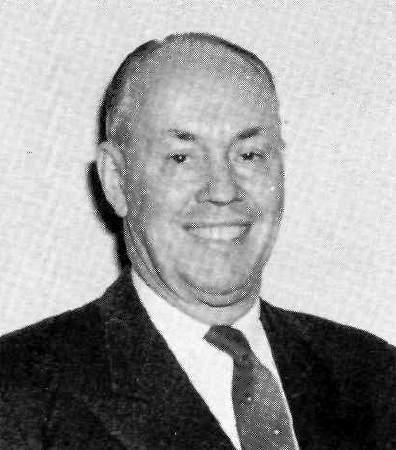
Nominee	Cal Rampton	Carl W. Buehner
Party	Democratic	Republican
Popular vote	289,283	131,729
Percentage	68.71%	31.29%
- County results Rampton: 50–60% 60–70% 70–80% 80–90% Buehner: 50–60%
Governor before election
Cal Rampton
Democratic
Elected Governor
Cal Rampton
Democratic

The 1968 Utah gubernatorial election was held on November 5, 1968. Democratic incumbent Cal Rampton defeated Republican nominee Carl W. Buehner with 68.71% of the vote. Rampton's victory was despite Republican candidate Richard Nixon winning the state with over 56% of the vote in the concurrent presidential election.

Rampton's share of the vote was the highest by any gubernatorial candidate in Utah to that point; Rampton would subsequently break his own record in the following election.

== Primary election ==
Primary elections were held on September 10, 1968.

=== Democratic primary ===
Incumbent governor Cal Rampton was renominated without opposition.

=== Republican primary ===
==== Candidates ====
- Carl W. Buehner, former general authority in the LDS Church
- LaMar A. Rawlings, former Salt Lake County auditor

==== Results ====
Republican primary results
Party	Candidate	Votes	%
Republican	Carl W. Buehner	93,635	70.12%
Republican	LaMar A. Rawlings	39,907	29.88%
Total votes		133,542	100.00%

== General election ==
=== Candidates ===
- Cal Rampton, Democratic
- Carl W. Buehner, Republican

=== Results ===
1968 Utah gubernatorial election
Party	Candidate	Votes	%	±%
Democratic	Cal Rampton (incumbent)	289,283	68.71%	+11.72%
Republican	Carl W. Buehner	131,729	31.29%	−11.72%
Total votes		421,012	100.00%	
Majority		157,554	37.42%	
Democratic hold		Swing	+23.45%	

=== Results by county ===
County	Cal Rampton Democratic		Carl W. Buehner Republican		Margin		Total votes cast
County	#	%	#	%	#	%	Total votes cast
Beaver	1,180	60.98%	755	39.02%	425	21.96%	1,935
Box Elder	7,095	60.88%	4,559	39.12%	2,536	21.76%	11,654
Cache	9,291	53.71%	8,008	46.29%	1,283	7.42%	17,299
Carbon	5,866	82.55%	1,240	17.45%	4,626	65.10%	7,106
Daggett	197	69.61%	86	30.39%	111	39.22%	283
Davis	23,193	67.94%	10,943	32.06%	12,250	35.89%	34,136
Duchesne	1,632	58.12%	1,176	41.88%	456	16.24%	2,808
Emery	1,576	65.86%	817	34.14%	759	31.72%	2,393
Garfield	751	50.50%	736	49.50%	15	1.01%	1,487
Grand	1,646	69.89%	709	30.11%	937	39.79%	2,355
Iron	2,720	54.32%	2,287	45.68%	433	8.65%	5,007
Juab	1,360	60.99%	870	39.01%	490	21.97%	2,230
Kane	515	45.82%	609	54.18%	-94	-8.36%	1,124
Millard	2,034	58.01%	1,472	41.99%	562	16.03%	3,506
Morgan	1,133	66.96%	559	33.04%	574	33.92%	1,692
Piute	363	57.62%	267	42.38%	96	15.24%	630
Rich	422	56.42%	326	43.58%	96	12.83%	748
Salt Lake	136,440	72.71%	51,209	27.29%	85,231	45.42%	187,649
San Juan	1,304	58.79%	914	41.21%	390	17.58%	2,218
Sanpete	2,979	56.11%	2,330	43.89%	649	12.22%	5,309
Sevier	2,632	55.72%	2,092	44.28%	540	11.43%	4,724
Summit	1,717	60.29%	1,131	39.71%	586	20.58%	2,848
Tooele	6,218	75.52%	2,016	24.48%	4,202	51.03%	8,234
Uintah	2,503	54.69%	2,074	45.31%	429	9.37%	4,577
Utah	31,906	64.55%	17,522	35.45%	14,384	29.10%	49,428
Wasatch	1,609	61.18%	1,021	38.82%	588	22.36%	2,630
Washington	2,697	54.17%	2,282	45.83%	415	8.34%	4,979
Wayne	524	64.37%	290	35.63%	234	28.75%	814
Weber	37,780	73.78%	13,429	26.22%	24,351	47.55%	51,209
Total	289,283	68.71%	131,729	31.29%	157,554	37.42%	421,012

==== Counties that flipped from Republican to Democratic ====
- Cache
- Emery
- Garfield
- Grand
- Iron
- Millard
- Piute
- Rich
- San Juan
- Sevier
- Uintah
- Washington
- Wayne
