= Abby Cox =

First Lady of Utah since 2021

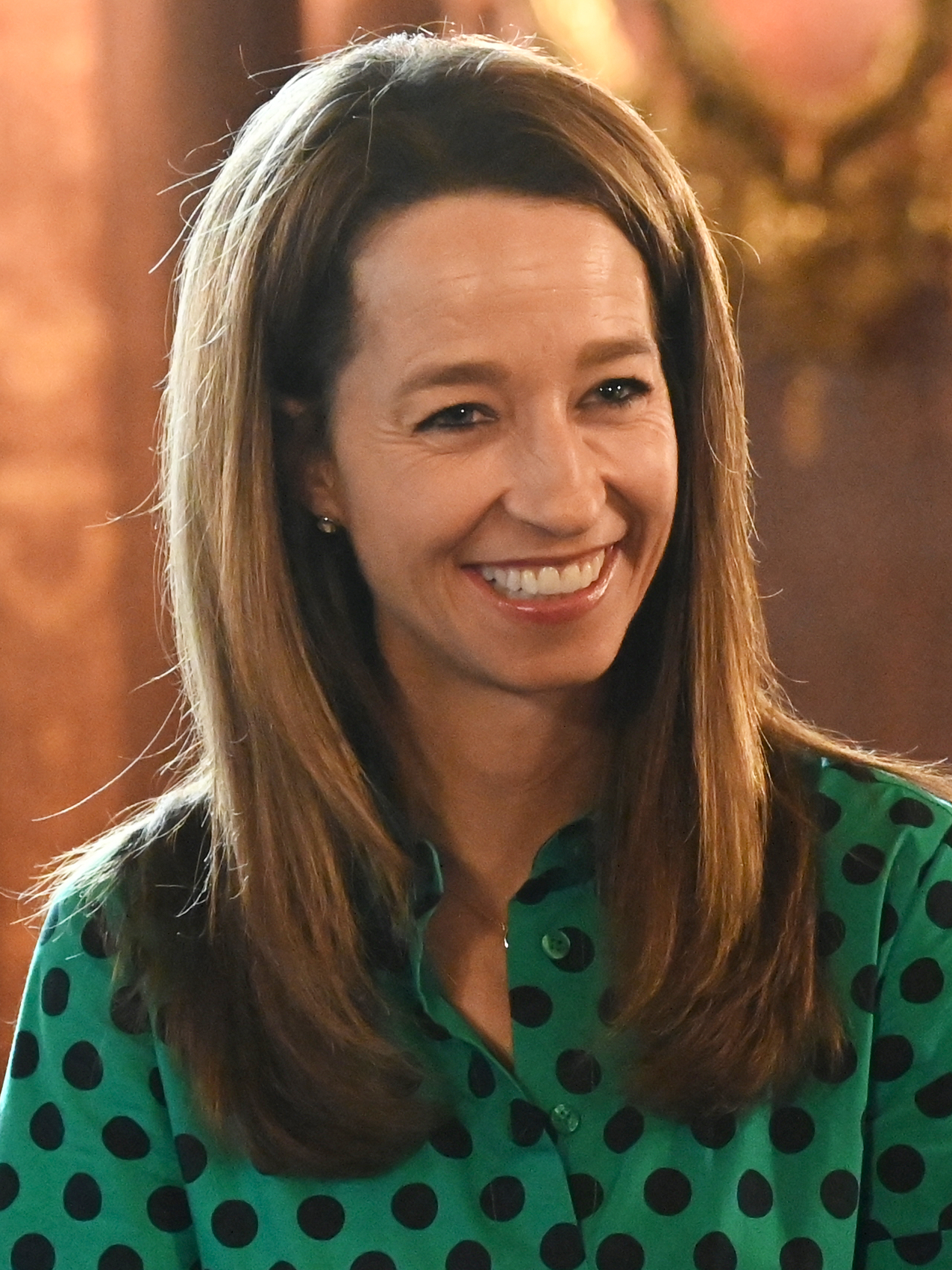
- Cox in 2024

First Lady of Utah
- Current
- Assumed role January 4, 2021
- Governor: Spencer Cox
- Preceded by: Jeanette Herbert

Second Lady of Utah
- In role October 16, 2013 – January 4, 2021
- Lieutenant Governor: Spencer Cox
- Preceded by: JoLynn Bell
- Succeeded by: Gabe Henderson (as second gentleman)

Personal details
- Born: Abby Palmer
- Party: Republican
- Spouse: Spencer Cox (m. 1996)
- Children: 4
- Parent(s): Ken Palmer; Charlene Palmer
- Education: Snow College; Utah State University (BA)

Abby Palmer Cox (née Palmer) is an American educator and mental health worker who has served as the first lady of Utah since 2021. The wife of the Utah governor Spencer Cox, she is the founder of Show Up, a statewide initiative supporting social and emotional learning, foster care, Unified Sports, and volunteerism.

== Early life and education ==
Cox was born in Mount Pleasant, Utah, and raised on her family's ranch as the fifth of ten children of Ken and Charlene Palmer. Growing up amid economic challenges and her father’s health issues, she began managing much of the ranch, at the age of 14, overseeing operations.

Cox attended North Sanpete High School and went on to graduate from Snow College. She later completed a bachelor's degree (BA) in special education at Utah State University, with a dual emphasis in early childhood and severe disabilities.

Before becoming first lady, Cox went on to work as an educator and took part in civic and charitable efforts, including PTA leadership, church youth programs, and services for people experiencing homelessness. She also continued to manage her family’s ranch, while supporting her husband’s business ventures and political activities, and raised their four children.

== First Lady of Utah (2021–present) ==
Cox became first lady on January 4, 2021, where her husband, Spencer Cox, was sworn in as governor of Utah.

=== Show Up initiative ===
In 2021, Cox launched Show Up, a statewide initiative supporting educator and student mental wellness, foster care families, Unified Sports, and volunteerism. Under her leadership, the program expanded Unified Sports from 30 to over 200 schools and organized more than 75 service projects by 2023.

Responding to feedback from educators, Cox introduced the Show Up for Teachers conference in 2022, offering free mental-health resources, professional development sessions, and opportunities for educators to share concerns with policymakers.

Cox also hosts the First Lady and Friends podcast and recognizes outstanding educators through events such as the annual Show Up for Teachers — Honors in Education Gala.

=== Medical leave ===
In April 2024, Cox underwent surgery to remove degenerative disc in her neck at University of Utah Hospital. The surgery prompted Governor Spencer Cox to miss several public events, including a meeting with the International Olympic Committee and a ceremonial bill signing.

== Awards ==
In October 2025, Cox received the Distinguished Service Award from Utah State University’s Emma Eccles Jones College of Education and Human Services for her work supporting educator wellness, foster youth, and access to Special Olympics programs, as well as promoting community engagement through her Show Up initiative.

== Personal life ==
Cox and her husband Spencer married in the late 1990s. The couple has four children: Gavin, Kaleb, Adam, and Emma Kate. They lived for years in Fairview, Utah, during Spencer’s tenure as lieutenant governor, commuting to Salt Lake City, and now primarily reside at the Utah Governor's Mansion.

Cox volunteered as a gestational carrier for her sister-in-law.

== See also ==
- First ladies and gentlemen of Utah
