= Marvin J. Ashton =

American religious leader

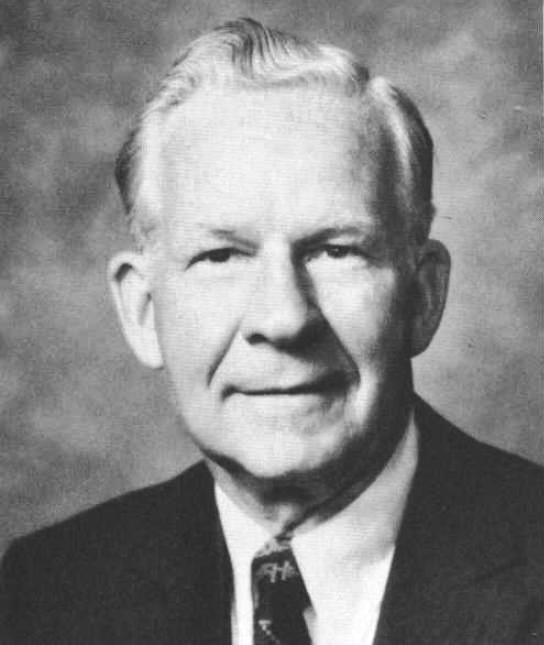

Quorum of the Twelve Apostles
- December 2, 1971 – February 25, 1994
- Called by: Joseph Fielding Smith

LDS Church Apostle
- December 2, 1971 – February 25, 1994
- Called by: Joseph Fielding Smith
- Reason: Death of Richard L. Evans
- Reorganization at end of term: Robert D. Hales ordained

Assistant to the Quorum of the Twelve Apostles
- October 3, 1969 – December 2, 1971
- Called by: David O. McKay
- End reason: Called to the Quorum of the Twelve Apostles

Personal details
- Born: Marvin Jeremy Ashton; May 6, 1915; Salt Lake City, Utah, United States
- Died: February 25, 1994 (aged 78); Salt Lake City, Utah, United States
- Resting place: Larkin Sunset Lawn Cemetery; 40°44′27.96″N 111°49′22.08″W

Marvin Jeremy Ashton (May 6, 1915 – February 25, 1994) was a Utah politician and a member of the Quorum of the Twelve Apostles of the Church of Jesus Christ of Latter-day Saints (LDS Church) from 1971 until his death in 1994.

== Early life ==
Ashton was born to Marvin O. Ashton and Rachel Grace Jeremy in Salt Lake City, Utah. His father was a local LDS leader and later became a church general authority. Ashton worked in the lumber business as a youth. He graduated from the University of Utah School of Business. He worked as managing director of LDS Social Services. Ashton served as a member of the Utah State Senate from 1957 to 1961 as a Republican. He was also president of Deseret Book and involved in other business ventures including a lumber company.

== LDS Church service ==
Ashton served a mission in Great Britain from 1937 to 1939 during which time he edited the Millennial Star. His mission president was Hugh B. Brown. From 1958 to 1969, Ashton was an assistant to the general superintendent of the church's Young Men's Mutual Improvement Association. He served as an assistant to superintendents Joseph T. Bentley and G. Carlos Smith.

He was named managing director of the then-newly formed Church Social Services Department in September 1969. A month later he was named an Assistant to the Quorum of the Twelve Apostles.

Ashton was ordained an apostle on December 2, 1971, after the death of Richard L. Evans. Among his assignments, he was president of the Polynesian Cultural Center and a member of the board of trustees of Brigham Young University–Hawaii.

Ashton died on February 25, 1994, and at the time of his death was serving as chairman of the church's Leadership Training Committee and was also a member of both the Correlation Executive and the General Welfare Services committees. The vacancy created in the Quorum of the Twelve was filled by Robert D. Hales.

== Personal life ==
Ashton married Norma Berntson in the Salt Lake Temple on August 22, 1940, and they were the parents of four children. They won the mixed doubles championship in the all-church tennis tournament in 1954. Ashton was involved with the Boy Scouts of America most of his life and earned Eagle Scout as an adult in 1963. As an adult he was a recipient of the Distinguished Eagle Scout Award, the Silver Beaver Award, and the Silver Antelope Award.

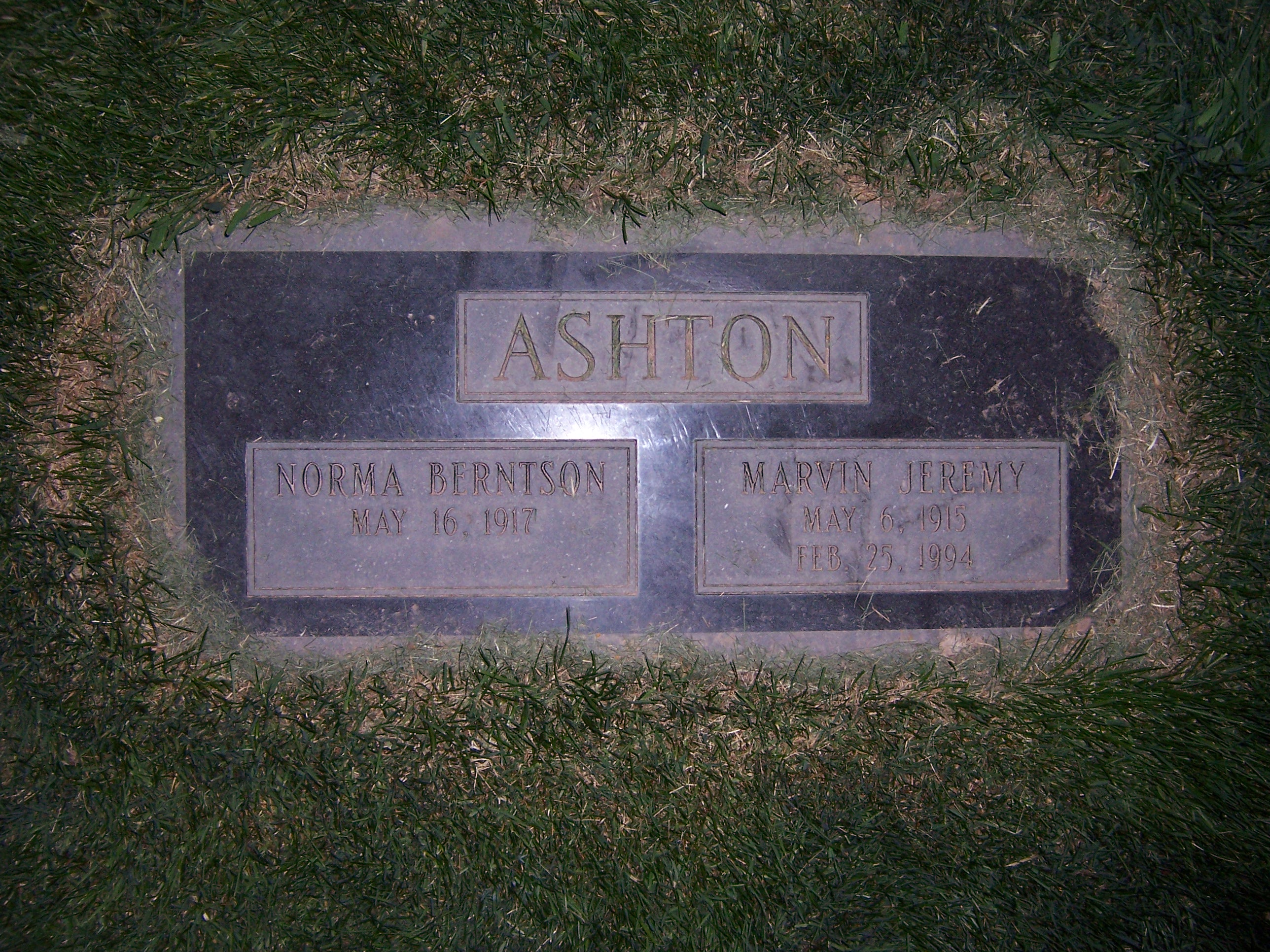
Marvin J. Ashton's grave marker

== Bibliography ==
- Ashton, Marvin J. (1978). What Is Your Destination?. Deseret Book Company. ISBN 0-87747-719-1.
- —— (1982). Ye Are My Friends. Deseret Book Company. ISBN 0-87747-934-8.
- —— (1987). Be of Good Cheer. Deseret Book Company. ISBN 0-87579-106-9.
- —— (1990). One for the Money. The Church of Jesus Christ of Latter-day Saints. ISBN 0-87579-417-3.
- —— (1991). The Measure of Our Hearts. Deseret Book Company. ISBN 0-87579-564-1.
- —— (1998). Classic Talks. Deseret Book Company. ISBN 0-87579-983-3.

== See also ==
- Carl W. Buehner
- George R. Hill III
- Hartshorn, Leon R. (1972). Outstanding Stories by General Authorities, Vol. 2. Salt Lake City: Deseret Book. p. 11.

The Church of Jesus Christ of Latter-day Saints titles
Preceded by Boyd K. Packer	Quorum of the Twelve Apostles; December 2, 1971 – February 25, 1994	Succeeded by Bruce R. McConkie
