= Quinn G. McKay =

American academic and Mormon leader (1926–2026)

Quinn Gunn McKay (October 30, 1926 – May 16, 2026) was an American academic, writer and a leader in The Church of Jesus Christ of Latter-day Saints (LDS Church).

== Life and career ==
Born on October 30, 1926, McKay was raised in Huntsville, Utah. Quinn McKay's father, James Gunn McKay, was a cousin to LDS Church president David O. McKay. McKay's brothers are K. Gunn McKay, Monroe G. McKay, and Barrie G. McKay.

McKay served in the United States Marine Corps during the last year of World War II. From 1948 to 1950 he was a Mormon missionary in England. After returning from England, McKay attended Weber State College and Brigham Young University (BYU). At BYU, he was the student body president; he graduated from BYU in 1954 with a degree in accounting. McKay then attended Harvard Business School, where he received an MBA in 1956.

After graduating from Harvard, McKay participated in a Ford Foundation program by becoming a visiting professor at Rangoon University. He received a DBA from Harvard in 1958 and took a job teaching business at BYU. McKay spent two years in Nigeria establishing a campus for the University of Pittsburgh, after which he became the dean of the business school at Weber State College. Later, he moved to Texas Christian University, and after his retirement, he was an adjunct professor at the University of Utah. In 2001, McKay became the president of the BYU Emeritus Association. Later in his career, McKay worked as a vice president of Skaggs Companies.

In the LDS Church, McKay was the second counselor to Neil D. Schaerrer in the general presidency of the Young Men organization from 1977 to 1979. From 1980 to 1983, McKay was the president of the England Coventry Mission of the church. He has also been a bishop in the church.

He the author of Money Matters In Your Marriage (1971); The Bottom Line on Integrity (1994); and Is Lying Sometimes the Right Thing for an Honest Person to Do?: How Self-Interest and the Competitive Business World Distort Our Moral Values and What We Should Do About It (1997).

McKay died on May 16, 2026, at the age of 99.

== Sources ==
- John A. Forster, "World of experience taught him love", Church News, 1977-06-18.
- Charlene R. Winters, "From Ethics to Emeriti", BYU Magazine, Summer 2001.
