= Mary Kaye Huntsman =

American activist

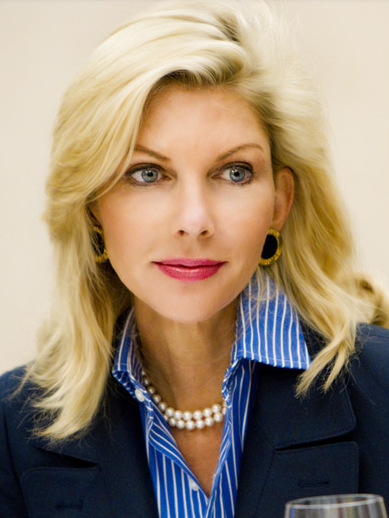
- Huntsman in 2011

First Lady of Utah
- In role January 3, 2005 – August 11, 2009
- Governor: Jon Huntsman Jr.
- Preceded by: Myron Walker
- Succeeded by: Jeanette Herbert

Personal details
- Born: Mary Kaye Cooper; September 10, 1961 (age 65) Orlando, Florida, U.S.
- Party: Republican
- Spouse: Jon Huntsman Jr. (m. 1983)
- Children: 7, including Abby
- Education: University of Utah; Arizona State University
- Occupation: Activist, philanthropist
- Known for: Wife of U.S. presidential candidate and former governor Jon Huntsman Jr.

Mary Kaye Huntsman (née Cooper; September 10, 1961) is an American activist who served as first lady of Utah from 2005 to 2009 as wife of Governor Jon Huntsman Jr. She launched and developed Bag of Hope and Power in You, programs that help children and teenagers deal with the emotional side of adversity with peer-to-peer and grownup support.

Time described Huntsman as having significant political gifts and being a major asset to her husband's political endeavors.

== Early life ==
Mary Kaye Cooper was born September 10, 1961, in Orlando, Florida, to an Episcopalian family. She is one of three daughters born to Mary Anne (Galloway) and Charles Floyd Cooper. When she was 14, in ninth grade, her family moved to Salt Lake City, Utah. She attended Highland High School in Salt Lake City where she met Jon Huntsman Jr. They were both active in student government. They started dating when they worked together at a Salt Lake City Marie Callender's Pie Shop.

While enrolled at the University of Utah, she worked as a dental assistant. She then transferred to Arizona State University, where she majored in family and consumer studies. Raised Episcopalian, she is a convert to the Church of Jesus Christ of Latter-day Saints.

== Marriage and children ==
While working in Washington, D.C., Cooper ran into Jon Huntsman, Jr., who was part of Ronald Reagan's 1980 presidential campaign, and the couple began dating seriously. They married in 1983 and have seven children: Mary Anne (b. 1985), Abigail (b. 1986), Elizabeth "Liddy" (b. 1988), Jon III (b. 1990), William (b. 1993), Gracie Mei (b. 1999; adopted from China), and Asha Bharati (b. 2006; adopted from India). Her two sons, Jon III and William, are currently active duty Naval Officers.

== First Lady of Utah (2005–2009) ==
Huntsman served as first lady of the state of Utah from 2005 to 2009. According to Judith George, Director of the Office of the First Lady Governor's Mansion of Utah, "The way people treat their staff is a telling point and Mrs. Huntsman was never out of sorts... She just treated her staff with great courtesy and respect."

== Philanthropy ==
Huntsman currently serves as the co-chair of National Cathedral School's Library Council, supporting the school's effort to build a state-of-the-art library. She previously served as Honorary Chair of the Literacy Commission and the Utah Coalition Against Sexual Assault. She twice co-chaired the annual "Speaking of Women's Health" conference. She also spoke out about the youth problem of cyberbullying.

Huntsman is known in Utah for her dedication to children's issues and her passion for getting others involved. While serving as Utah's First Lady, Huntsman built on her experience with Bag of Hope, and started a program called Power in You, a mentoring program for teens to help them cope with a variety of adversities, cyber bullying and drug addiction, among other things.

In 1997, Huntsman and her daughter Liddy, who at age eight was diagnosed with type 1 diabetes, initiated the Bag of Hope program in Salt Lake City to help children and their families cope with juvenile diabetes. The program helps provide emotional support to newly-diagnosed children, and provides them with gift bags containing things like diabetes-safe snacks and helpful information about the condition. Bag of Hope has grown to become a national program headed by the Juvenile Diabetes Research Foundation, and was later expanded to include cancer patients as well.

Huntsman is on the Board of Selectors of Jefferson Awards for Public Service.

== Wife of United States Ambassador ==
=== Wife of U.S. Ambassador to Singapore ===
Huntsman lived in Singapore from 1992 to 1993, while husband Jon Huntsman Jr. served as United States Ambassador to Singapore.

=== Wife of U.S. Ambassador to China ===
From 2009 to 2011, she lived in China. Huntsman described her role as tending "to the well-being and morale of all the other embassy families".

Huntsman engaged in an attack against cigarette advertising in China. She shared with the Chinese her personal loss: her sister died of acute lung cancer at the age of 34. Noting that one-fourth of the population in China smokes – 66% of men and 10% of women – Huntsman implored the Chinese women to not succumb to the media campaign that was trying to seduce them to smoke.

=== Wife of U.S. Ambassador to Russia ===
Huntsman lived in Moscow from 2017 to 2019 while husband Jon Huntsman Jr. served as United States Ambassador to Russia, during one of the most tumultuous periods between the United States and Russia. She spent many of her days with diplomatic families, helping rebuild morale during a distinctly challenging time.

== 2012 presidential campaign ==
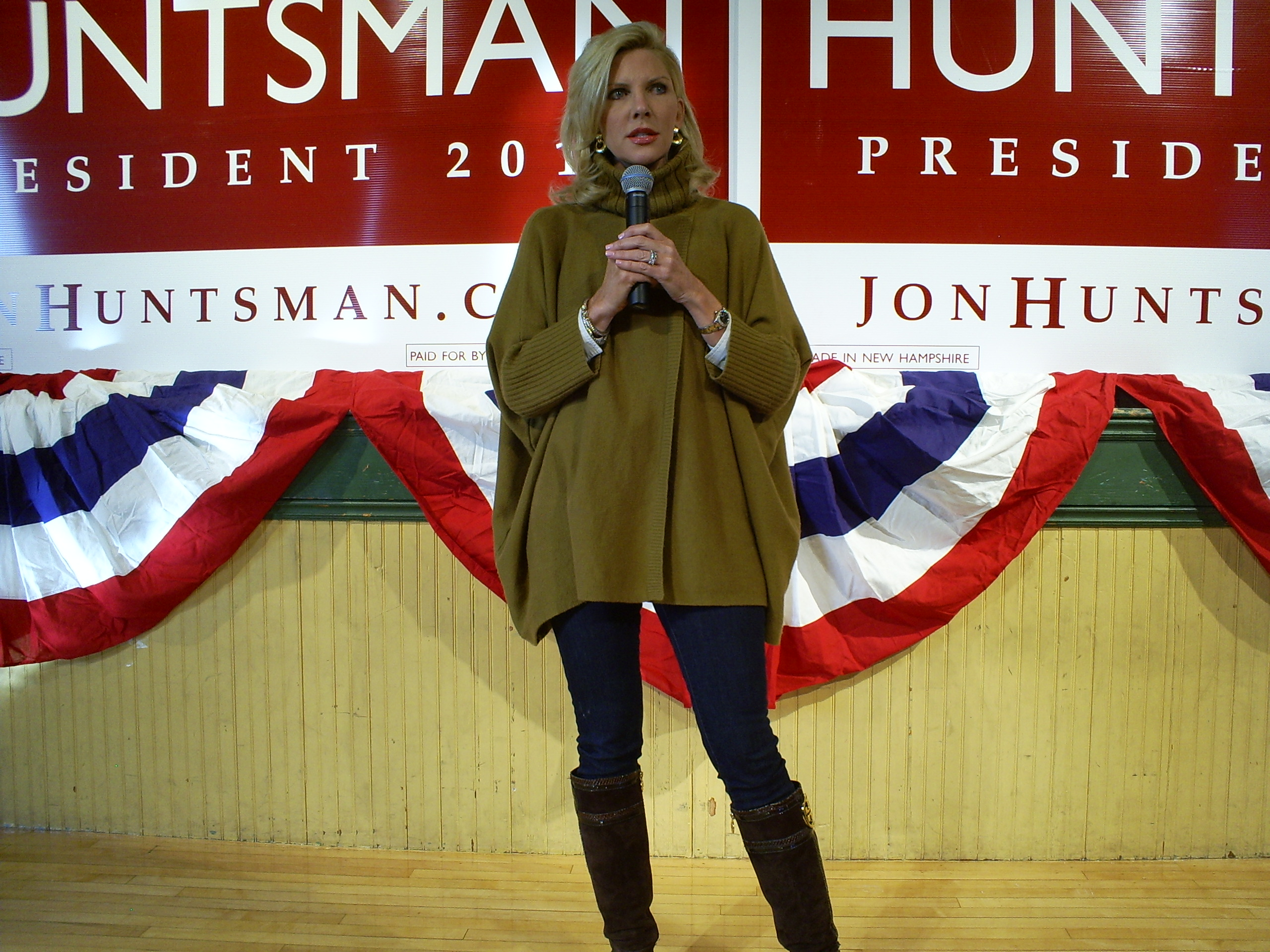
In New Hampshire, 2012

Regarding her husband running for office in the 2012 presidential election, Huntsman said, "I am very comfortable. I feel very much at peace about it. At the end of the day it's his decision, and he knows we are 100 percent behind him. I believe in him." She was instrumental in making the strategic decision to headquarter her husband's 2012 Presidential Campaign in Orlando, Florida. She lived in Orlando until she was 14, and her parents and some extended family live there now. Mark Halperin of Time magazine says, "she has political gifts that rival her husband's and a Southern/Sunshine State upbringing that will be a major asset."
