= G. Carlos Smith =

George Carlos Smith Jr. (23 August 1910 – 29 March 1987) was the eleventh general superintendent of the Young Men's Mutual Improvement Association (YMMIA) of the Church of Jesus Christ of Latter-day Saints (LDS Church) from 1962 to 1969.

== Biography ==
Smith was born in Salt Lake City, Utah, to George Carlos and Lillian Emery Smith. He became the president of the LDS Church's Big Cottonwood Utah Stake in 1949. In 1956, he became the president of the Holladay Utah Stake. In 1958, Smith became the first assistant to Joseph T. Bentley, the general superintendent of the YMMIA. He was released in June 1961, but in October 1962 Smith was asked to succeed Bentley and become the YMMIA superintendent. During his tenure, Smith had three different assistants: Carl W. Buehner, George R. Hill, and future LDS Church apostle Marvin J. Ashton. In 1969 Smith was released; his successor was W. Jay Eldredge.

In 1969, Smith became the first president of the church's Southeast Asia Mission, which was headquartered in Singapore and had stewardship for Indonesia, India, and most of the countries in Southeast Asia. This included supervising church members in South Vietnam. Some of the church's servicemen who were in Vietnam were called to serve as part-time missionaries. Both other American servicemen and native Vietnamese were baptized as a result of these efforts. Smith had previously presided over the Central States Mission of the church.

Smith married P. Lavon Petersen and was the father of five children. He was the grandson of LDS Church president Joseph F. Smith. He died in Salt Lake City at age 76.

The Church of Jesus Christ of Latter-day Saints titles
Preceded by Joseph T. Bentley	Superintendent of the Young Men’s Mutual Improvement Association; 1962–1969	Succeeded by W. Jay Eldredge
