= W. Jay Eldredge =

Walter Joshua "Jay" Eldredge Jr. (27 April 1913 – 27 April 2002) was the thirteenth general superintendent of the Young Men's Mutual Improvement Association of the Church of Jesus Christ of Latter-day Saints (LDS Church) from 1969 to 1972.

== Biography ==
In 1969, he succeeded G. Carlos Smith as the leader of the YMMIA. In November 1972, Eldredge became the first general superintendent of that organization to be called the general president of the YMMIA. Just weeks after this change in terminology, Eldredge was released and was succeeded by his second counselor, Robert L. Backman.

Prior to his service in the YMMIA, Eldredge had been a church mission president in the eastern United States and was the first president of the Parley's Stake of the church.

Eldredge was born in Salt Lake City, Utah, to Walter Joshua and Lutie S. Nicholson Eldredge. He married Marjory Ormsby Hyde, a great-granddaughter of LDS Church apostle Orson Hyde. Together they had five children. He died in Salt Lake City on his 89th birthday.

== See also ==
- George I. Cannon
- George R. Hill

The Church of Jesus Christ of Latter-day Saints titles
Preceded by G. Carlos Smith	Superintendent of the Young Men’s Mutual Improvement Association; 1969–November 1972	Succeeded by Robert L. Backman as President of the Aaronic Priesthood MIA Young Women
