= Cal Rampton =

American politician (1913–2007)

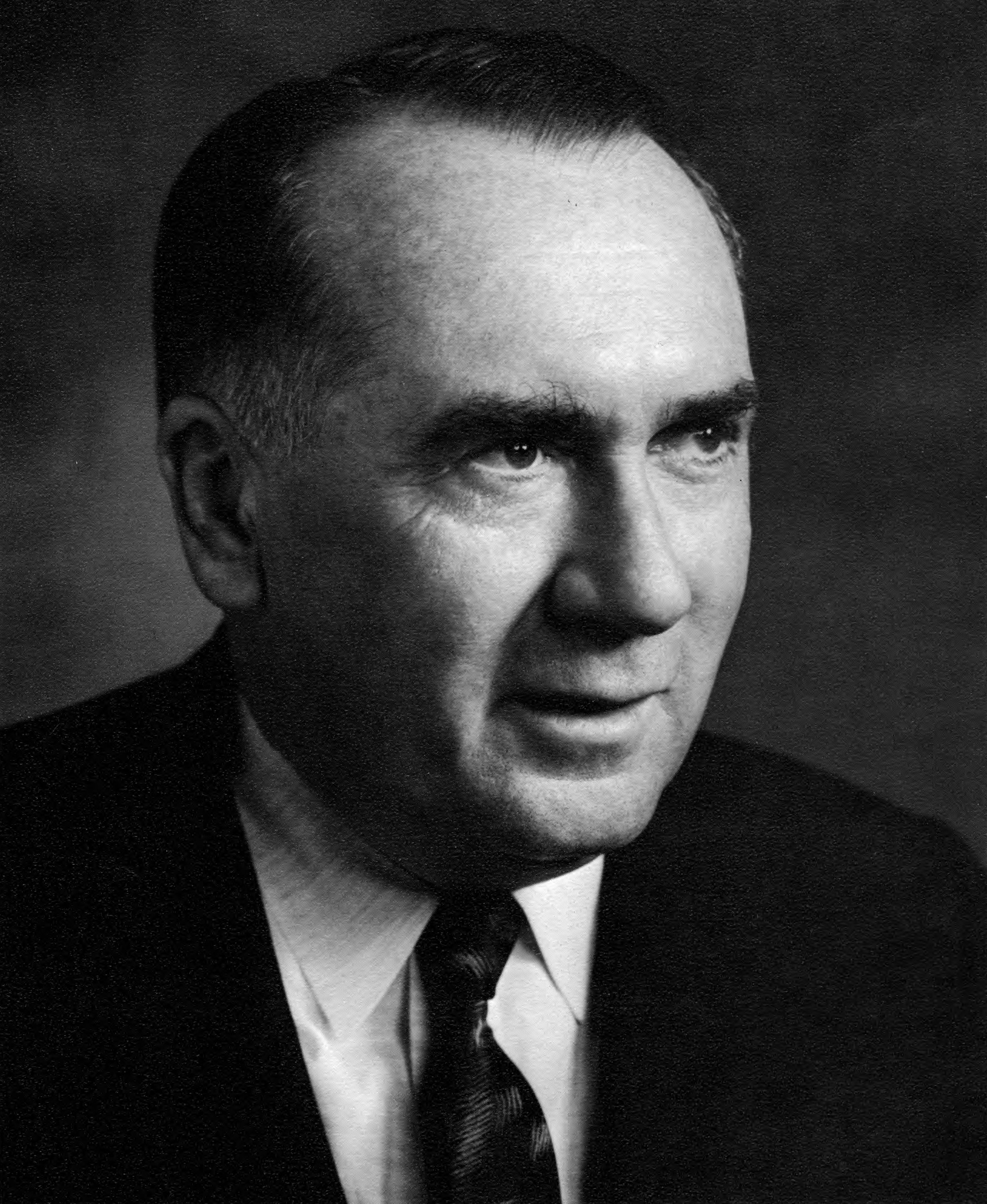

11th Governor of Utah
- In office January 4, 1965 – January 3, 1977
- Lieutenant: None (1965–1975); Clyde L. Miller (1975–1977)
- Preceded by: George Clyde
- Succeeded by: Scott Matheson

Chair of the National Governors Association
- In office June 2, 1974 – June 8, 1975
- Preceded by: Daniel J. Evans
- Succeeded by: Robert D. Ray

Personal details
- Born: Calvin Lewellyn Rampton; November 6, 1913 Bountiful, Utah, U.S.
- Died: September 16, 2007 (aged 93) Holladay, Utah, U.S.
- Resting place: Salt Lake City Cemetery
- Party: Democratic
- Spouse: Lucybeth Cardon (m. 1940; died 2004)
- Children: 4
- Education: University of Utah (BA); George Washington University (LLB)

Military service
- Allegiance: United States
- Branch/service: United States Army
- Battles/wars: World War II

Calvin Lewellyn Rampton (November 6, 1913 – September 16, 2007) was an American attorney and politician who served as the 11th governor of Utah from 1965 to 1977.

With a tenure spanning for 12 years, he is both the longest serving governor of Utah, and the only Democrat to have served more than two terms.

== Early life and education ==
He was born on November 6, 1913 to Llewellyn Smith Rampton and Janet Campbell in Bountiful, Utah. Following his graduation from Davis High School in 1931, Rampton took over his family's automobile business, due to his father's death that same year. He sold the business in 1933 and entered the University of Utah, graduating in 1936. He also studied at the George Washington University Law School while working as administrative assistant to Congressman J. W. Robinson.

== Career ==
Rampton served as Davis County Attorney from 1938 to 1940, the only other public office he would be elected to until becoming governor in 1965.

Rampton served in Europe during World War II as Chief of the Army Claims Commission in Paris; he attained the rank of major and received the Bronze Star Medal. Rampton continued to serve in the Army Reserve and attained the rank of colonel before retiring. After the war he pursued a career as an attorney and his success in civil trial practice earned him a fellowship with the International Academy of Trial Lawyers. He was a Democratic candidate for the Utah State Senate in 1954 and United States Senate in 1962.

He was elected Governor of Utah in 1964, winning just under 57% of the vote over Republican Mitchell Melich. He would be re-elected in 1968 with over 68% of the vote and re-elected to a third term in 1972 with over 69% of the vote. In 1968, he would win every county in the state except for Kane, which would go for his Republican opponent Carl W. Buehner. In 1972, Rampton would flip Kane, but lose Uintah County to his Republican opponent Nicholas L. Strike, meaning that twice he won every county in the state except for one. He is the only governor of Utah to serve three full consecutive terms, and was one of the most popular governors in the country.

During his governorship, he successfully advocated for increased education spending, civil rights legislation, and allocating federal funds for urban renewal. He was a supporter of the Equal Rights Amendment to the U.S. Constitution, and advocated successfully for state construction projects, including Salt Lake City’s Symphony Hall (now Abravanel Hall) and the Salt Lake Arts Center (now Utah Museum of Contemporary Art).

After leaving office, Rampton practiced law until he retired at the age of 75.

== Personal life ==
Rampton married Lucybeth Cardon (1914–2004) on March 10, 1940; they had four children.

On September 16, 2007, Rampton died of a stroke and organ failure in Holladay, Utah. Earlier reports said that he had cancer, but his family denied it. He was 93 years old. Shortly after his death, the Salt Palace Convention Center in Salt Lake City was also named in his honor. The Calvin L. Rampton Complex in Taylorsville, which houses the Utah Department of Transportation and the Utah Department of Public Safety, is also named in his honor.

== Sources ==
- Cal Rampton: Former three-term governor dies at 93
- Utah History Research Center
- An Interview with Former Gov. Rampton

Party political offices
Preceded by William Barlocker	Democratic nominee for Governor of Utah; 1964, 1968, 1972	Succeeded by Scott Matheson
Political offices
Preceded by George Clyde	Governor of Utah; 1965–1977	Succeeded by Scott Matheson
Preceded by Daniel J. Evans	Chair of the National Governors Association; 1974–1975	Succeeded by Robert D. Ray
