= George Dewey Clyde =

American politician

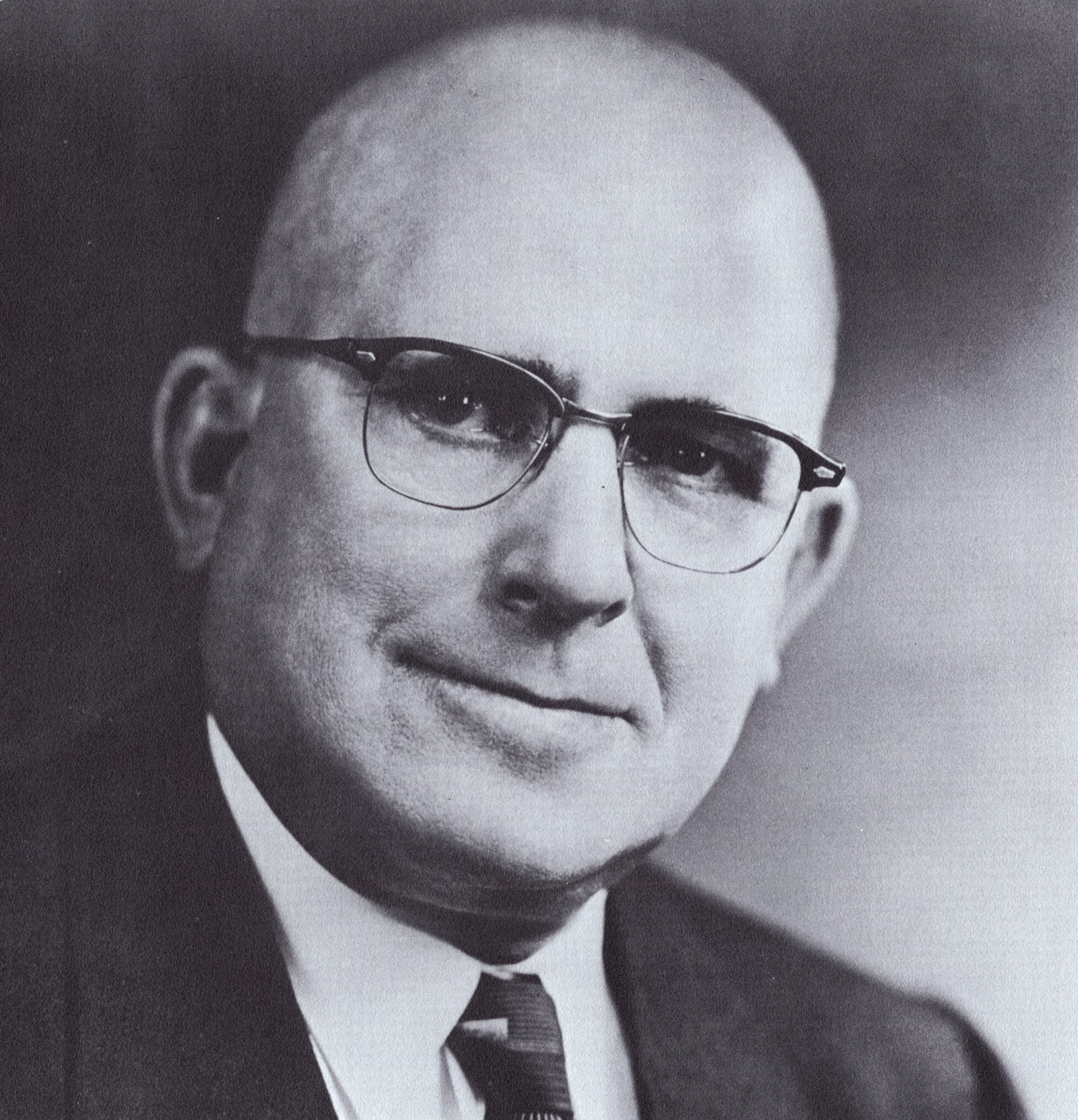

10th Governor of Utah
- In office January 7, 1957 – January 4, 1965
- Preceded by: J. Bracken Lee
- Succeeded by: Cal Rampton

Personal details
- Born: July 21, 1898 Springville, Utah, U.S.
- Died: April 2, 1972 (aged 73)
- Party: Republican
- Spouse: Ora Packard
- Children: 5
- Education: Utah State University (BS); University of California, Berkeley (MS)

George Dewey Clyde (July 21, 1898 – April 2, 1972) was an American politician and the tenth governor of Utah, serving two terms from 1957 until 1965 as a Republican.

Although Clyde was on the faculty of Utah State University for twenty-two years, serving as Dean of the agricultural college's College of Engineering and Technology, he is best known for an eight-year battle with Utah school teachers that eventually resulted in the first statewide teachers strike in United States history during May 1964. He was also involved in the creation of Canyonlands National Park. He came from a prominent Latter-day Saint family in Springville, south of Provo, Utah. Clyde was the younger brother of W. W. Clyde, wealthy philanthropist and founder of W.W. Clyde Company and Geneva Rock.

Clyde received his bachelor's degree from Utah State University and a master's degree from the University of California, Berkeley. Clyde was the last Republican to serve as Governor of Utah until 1985, when Norman H. Bangerter became the state’s 13th Governor.

== Public service ==
In 1934, Clyde was appointed as a Utah state water conservator during a period of drought and was later appointed to the advisory board of the Utah Department of Industrial Development Water Resource Division. He also was elected director and later the vice-president of the Utah Water Users Association. In 1945, Clyde was appointed chief of the Division of Irrigation Engineering and Water Conservation and Research for the U. S. Soil Conservation Service. In 1953, he became the director of the Utah Water and Power Board.

In 1956, Clyde defeated incumbent J. Bracken Lee, running as an Independent, and Democrat L.C. Romney in the gubernatorial race.

During Clyde's first term as governor, he succeeded in increasing state aid to education and teacher salaries. During these first years as governor, highway construction increased by 500 percent, state personnel practices and wages improved, and new programs for public welfare, state parks, and libraries were initiated. As a fiscal conservative, however, he refused to bond the state for the increasing building needs of higher education.

During Clyde's second term he again came into conflict with educators. His administration's spending increases for education fell short of perceived needs and a two-day classroom walk-out was staged. The National Education Association voted sanctions against Utah. Clyde finally approved a large state building bill that included education but did not require bonding.

The creation of Canyonlands National Park also created publicity and conflict during the governor's second term. Utah's Senator Frank E. Moss proposed the national park but Clyde felt the park was too large and tied up much of Utah's natural resources. After a public political battle, a reluctant compromise led to the creation of a smaller national park.

Other events during Clyde's terms included breaking ground for the new interstate highway and the construction of the University of Utah's Medical School. Clyde also vetoed a Sunday closing bill in favor of minorities. Clyde chose not to run for a third term.

Clyde suffered a stroke soon after retirement and died from effects of the stroke on April 2, 1972.

Party political offices
Preceded by J. Bracken Lee	Republican nominee for Governor of Utah; 1956, 1960	Succeeded by Carl W. Buehner
Political offices
Preceded by J. Bracken Lee	Governor of Utah; 1957–1965	Succeeded by Cal Rampton
