= Lake Bellevue =

Lake in Bellevue, Washington, United States

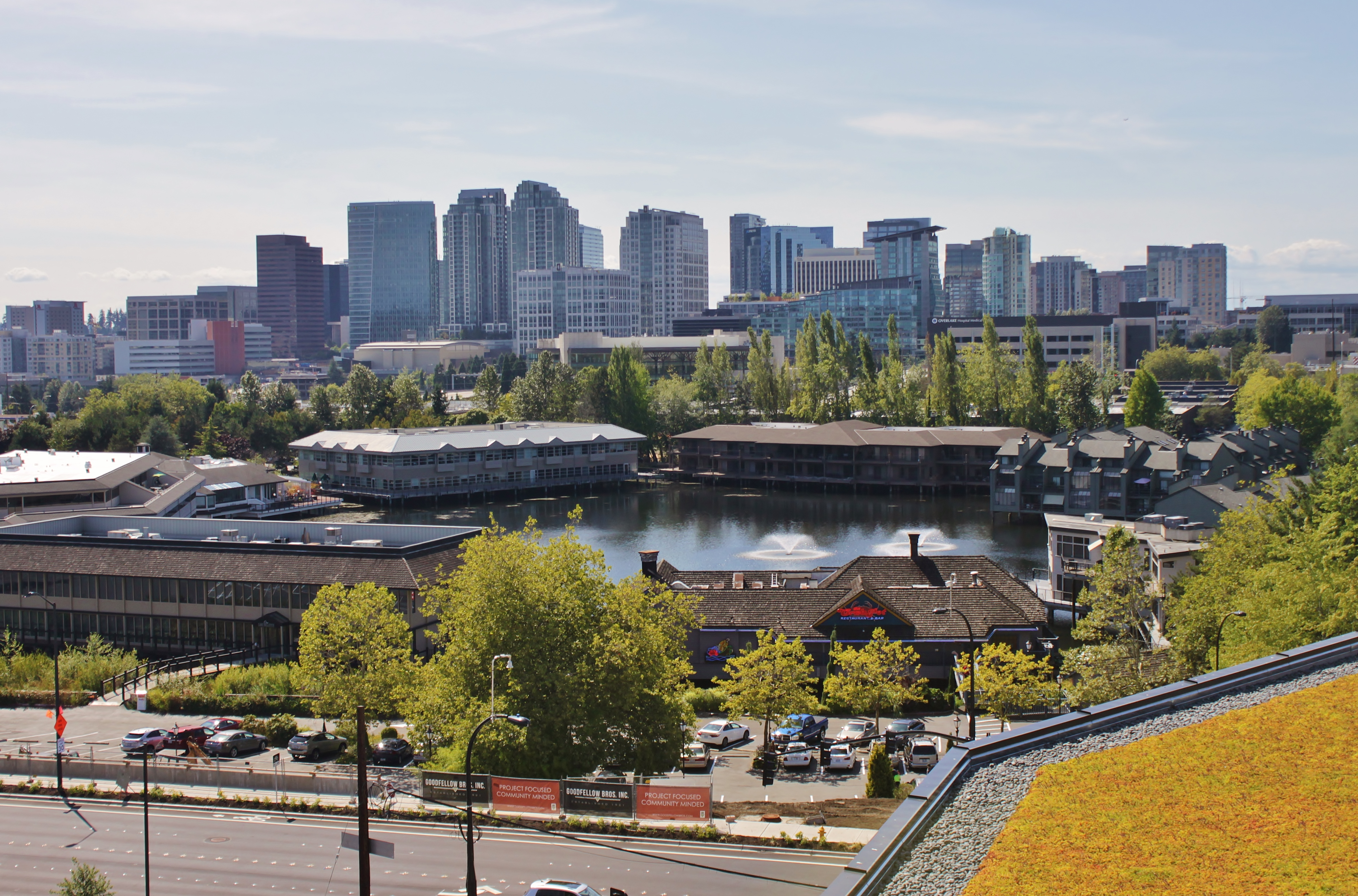
- Lake Bellevue and the Downtown Bellevue skyline, seen from the east

- Location within Washington (state) Location within the United States
- Location: Bellevue, Washington
- Coordinates: 47°37′12″N 122°10′54″W
- Basin countries: United States
- Surface area: 10 acres (4.0 ha)
- Surface elevation: 141 ft (43 m)

Lake Bellevue, also called Lake Sturtevant, is a small lake inside the city limits of Bellevue, Washington. Along with Phantom Lake and Larsen Lake, it is one of three small lakes inside the city, which also borders Lake Washington and Lake Sammamish. Sturtevant Creek, a tributary of Kelsey Creek, has its origin at Lake Bellevue and contains Chinook (an endangered species), Sockeye and Coho salmon. In the 773-acre (313 ha) creek basin, 71% of the land has an impervious surface (roads and parking lots).

The lake is named for settler Clark Merrill Sturtevant, a United States Civil War veteran who homesteaded there in 1872.

Tracks for the Northern Pacific Railroad passing near the lake were laid in 1904. Sound Transit acquired part of the railroad's right of way for East Link Extension, a light rail project. Construction of the Wilburton station, near the west side of the lake, began in 2017. The Spring District development and its separate light rail station are near the northeastern shore of the lake, about one half mile (one kilometer) away.

== See also ==
- Forbes Creek (Washington) § Forbes Lake, a lake in the adjacent city of Kirkland, with similar surface area and geology, also homesteaded by a Civil War veteran
