= Columbia River Washington Temple =

Temple of the LDS Church

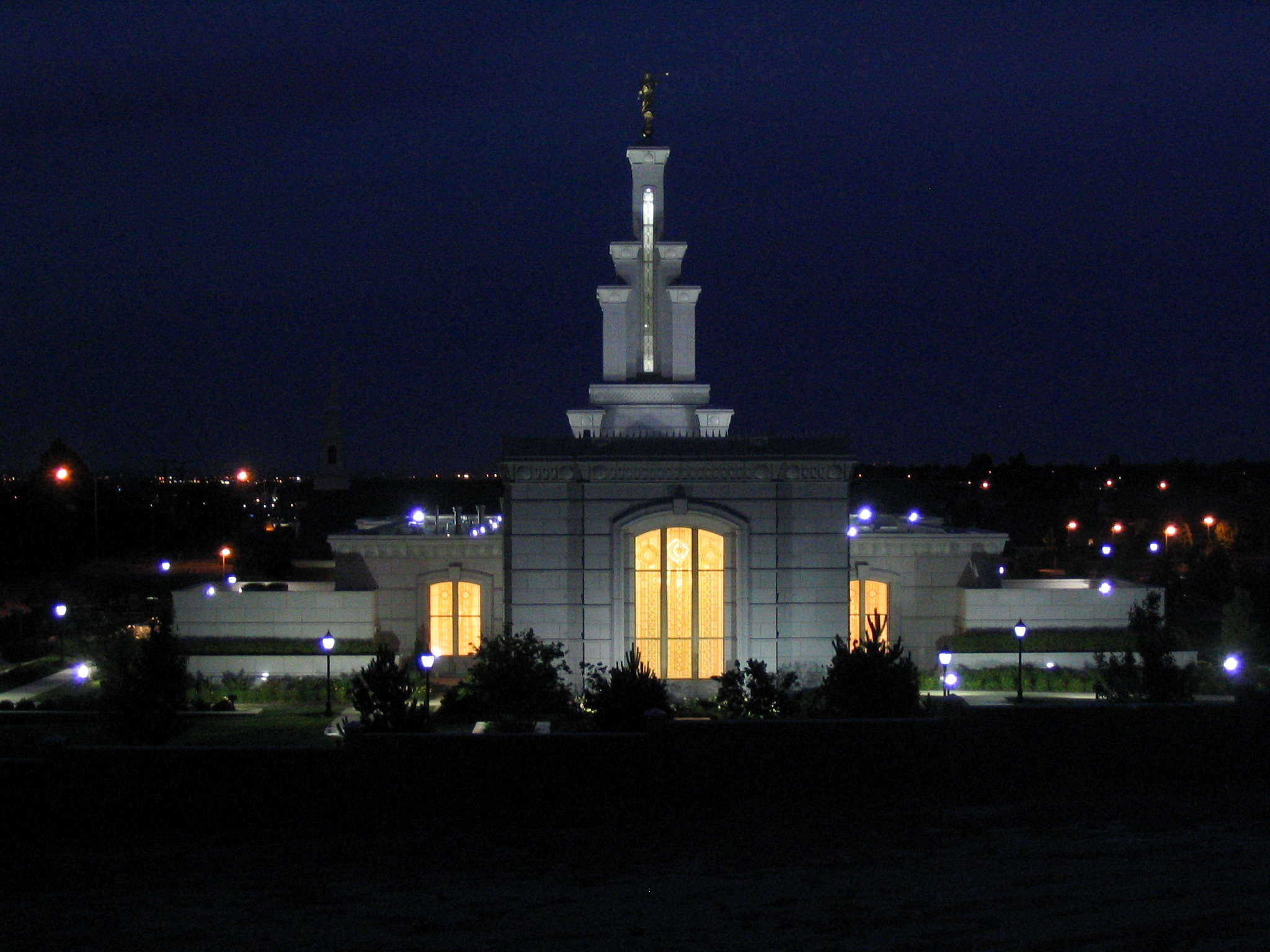
- Interactive map of Columbia River Washington Temple
- Number: 107
- Dedication: November 18, 2001, by Gordon B. Hinckley
- Site: 2.88 acres (1.17 ha)
- Floor area: 16,880 ft^{2} (1,568 m^{2})
- Official website • News & images

Church chronology
← Perth Australia Temple	Columbia River Washington Temple	→ Snowflake Arizona Temple

Additional information
- Announced: April 2, 2000, by Gordon B. Hinckley
- Groundbreaking: October 28, 2000, by Stephen A. West
- Open house: October 27 – November 10, 2001
- Current president: Kelly W. Brown
- Designed by: A & E Services, Joseph E. Marty Architect
- Location: Richland, Washington, United States
- Coordinates: 46°13′36.23880″N 119°16′29.61480″W
- Exterior finish: Bethel white granite from Vermont and Italy
- Design: Classic modern, single-spire design
- Baptistries: 1
- Ordinance rooms: 2 (two-stage progressive)
- Sealing rooms: 2

The Columbia River Washington Temple is the 107th operating temple of the Church of Jesus Christ of Latter-day Saints (LDS Church). The intent to build the temple was announced on April 2, 2000, by church president Gordon B. Hinckley, during general conference. The temple, located in Richland near Badger Mountain, is the third in the state of Washington, following the Seattle Washington and Spokane Washington temples.

The temple has a single attached central spire with a statue of the angel Moroni. It was designed by the church’s temple design group, using a traditional architectural style. A groundbreaking ceremony, to signify the beginning of construction, was held on October 28, 2000, conducted by Stephen A. West of the Seventy.

== History ==
Church membership in Washington grew from 67,000 members in 1970 to nearly 230,000 in 2001. With this growth, church leaders felt another temple should be built in the state and it serves members in eastern Washington and northern Oregon.

Some parts of the temple foundation includes 2-inch river rock used as fill in concrete forms. During construction, people were allowed access to open bins of this river rock at the edge of the site. Many people wrote names of children, loved ones, etc. on the rocks that were later incorporated into the building.

The temple was announced in April 2000 and groundbreaking ceremonies followed that year, with Stephen A. West, a general authority who served as a missionary in the area many years before, presiding.

Before the temple was dedicated it was open to the public from October 27-November 10, 2001. Nearly 65,000 people visited during the open house period. LDS Church president Gordon B. Hinckley dedicated the temple on November 18, 2001.

This temple included a return to the use of murals to decorate the ordinance rooms used in the endowment. Murals had been a standard feature of the church's temples, from those first constructed in Utah through the Los Angeles California Temple, which was dedicated in 1956. The Columbia River Washington Temple has a first room decorated with murals which leads into a second room without murals. This pattern has been followed in most temples dedicated since.

In 2020, like all the church's others, the Columbia River Washington Temple was closed for a time in response to the COVID-19 pandemic.

== Design and architecture ==
The building has a traditional architectural style and was designed by the church’s architectural and temple construction department to reflect both the cultural heritage of the region and its spiritual significance to the church.

The temple is on a 2.88-acre plot, with surrounding landscaping including a fountain. The structure is 106 feet tall, constructed with Bethel white granite, providing a “shimmering granite exterior.”

The interior has German art-glass windows and hand-painted murals. The temple includes two ordinance rooms, two sealing rooms, and a baptistry, each designed for ceremonial use.

The design uses elements representing Latter-day Saint symbolism, to provide deeper spiritual meaning to its appearance and function. Symbolism is important to church members and includes angel Moroni statue on top of the spire, which represents “the restoration of the gospel of Jesus Christ.”

== Temple presidents ==
The church's temples are directed by a temple president and matron, each serving for a term of three years. The president and matron oversee the administration of temple operations and provide guidance and training for both temple patrons and staff.

Serving from 2001 to 2004, Allan D. Alder was the first president, with Roma L. Alder serving as matron. As of 2025, Kelly W. Brown is the president, with Sharon G. Brown being the matron.

== Admittance ==
Following completion of construction, the church held a public open house from October 27-November 10, 2001 (excluding Sundays), with 64,362 visitors. The temple was dedicated by Gordon B. Hinckley on November 18, 2001, in four sessions.

Like all the church's temples, it is not used for Sunday worship services. To members of the church, temples are regarded as sacred houses of the Lord. Once dedicated, only church members with a current temple recommend can enter for worship.

== See also ==
Temples in and near Washington ()

Temples in Washington or with districts
extending into Washington
= Operating
= Under construction
= Announced
= Temporarily Closed

- The Church of Jesus Christ of Latter-day Saints in Washington
- Comparison of temples of The Church of Jesus Christ of Latter-day Saints
- List of temples of The Church of Jesus Christ of Latter-day Saints
- List of temples of The Church of Jesus Christ of Latter-day Saints by geographic region
- Temple architecture (Latter-day Saints)
