= Nancy Skinner Nordhoff =

American philanthropist (1932–2026)

- Born: Nancy Skinner; 1932; Seattle, Washington, U.S.
- Died: January 7, 2026 (aged 93)
- Occupations: Philanthropist, environmentalist

Nancy Skinner Nordhoff (1932 – January 7, 2026) was an American philanthropist and environmentalist. Nordhoff's work is primarily focused in the Seattle and Langley, Washington regions, where she worked to empower women, support rural communities and promote environmentalism of Washington's flora and fauna. In 2006, she was designated a Women's History Month Honoree by the National Women's History Project.

== Background ==
Nordhoff was raised in the Laurelhurst neighborhood of Seattle, Washington by her parents, Winifred and Gilbert Skinner. She was the youngest daughter of three children. Her family are historically philanthropists. Her grandmother, Jeannette C. Skinner was one of the founders of the Seattle Children's Hospital, and her grandfather, Edward Skinner, was intricate in Alaska's economy. Her brother, D.E. Ned Skinner helped to improve Seattle life during the 20th-century and helped create the 1962 Seattle World's Fair and would help fund the restoration of the 5th Avenue Theatre.

She described her home life as "broken." Her parents were divorced by the time she was five. She grew up living with her mother, who was a career volunteer. She attended St. Nicholas School, an independent, private all girls school, now part of Lakeside in Seattle and played volleyball in school. She was awarded a Lakeside Distinguished Alumni Award in 1981. In 1954, she graduated from Mount Holyoke College with a degree in chemistry. After school she would go on to get her pilot's license and would fly a single engine Piper Tripacer across the country during her early days of philanthropy, between 1955 and 1957. In 1957, she met Arthur Nordhoff, the son of the founder of Bellevue Airfield. They would be married and have three children.

At the age of 50, Nordhoff quit all volunteer projects and bought a van and traveled the country, which served as her mid-life crisis. Through her travels she sought to find herself and explore her place in the world. This time would provide the inspiration for the Hedgebrook Retreat Center. Still an active philanthropist, Nordhoff lived in Langley, Washington with her spouse Lynn Hays.

Nordhoff died on January 7, 2026, at the age of 93.

== Philanthropic career ==
Nordhoff generously puts her money, time, and energy into visionary projects. Her sense of achievement comes not only from funding and building, but from having an idea and taking action to make it happen.
The National Women's History Project, 2006

After graduating school she dove into philanthropy. She worked with the United Way and the Skinner Family Foundation. In 1976, she served on the founding board of the Pacific Northwest Grantmakers Forum, later renamed Philanthropy Northwest. In 1985, after her mid-life crisis, Nordhoff built and founded the Hedgebrook Writer's Retreat. In 2006, Gloria Steinem spent three weeks at the retreat center.

Nordhoff also supported environmental causes. She donated the funds to build a downtown park to the city of Langley, Washington. In Langley she also funded the restoration of an old farmhouse for the conference facility of the Whidbey Institute and donated 24 acres of wetlands for salmon conservation. In order to support her philanthropic work in the area, she founded the Goosefoot Community Fund, which supports environmental, development, housing and rural economic support on Whidbey Island. The Fund has renovated historical areas of the island, including the Bayview Corner and Greenbank Farm. Nordhoff has also financed projects through the National Women's History Project. For over 25 years, she has served as a funder and advisor for the Women's Funding Alliance of Seattle.

In 2009, Nordhoff was awarded the National Philanthropy Day award for "Outstanding Philanthropist".
