= Blueberry Lake =

Blueberry Lake most often refers to:

- Larsen Lake, Washington state
- Blueberry Lake, Nova Scotia
