= The Church of Jesus Christ of Latter-day Saints in Washington (state) =

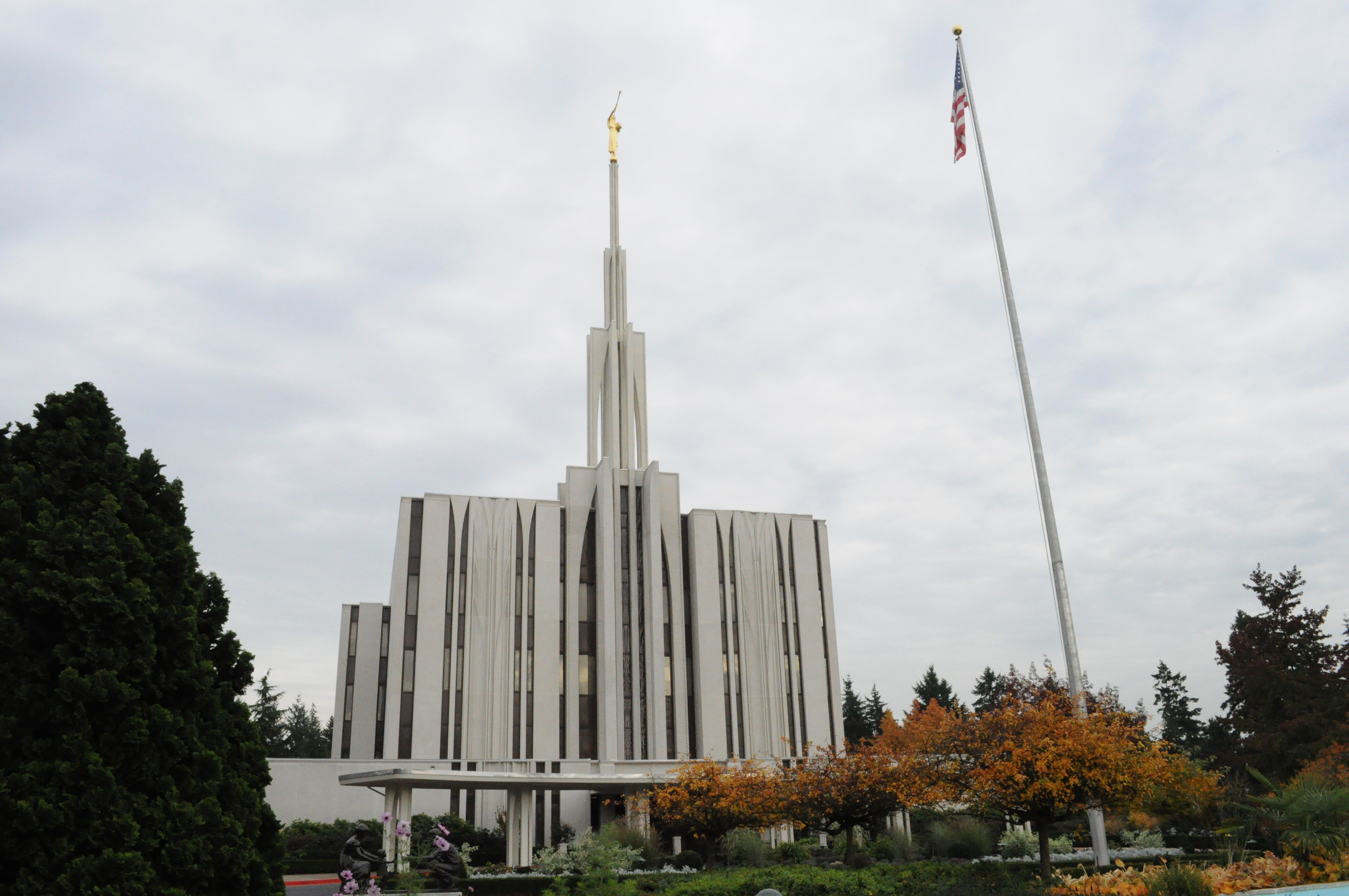
- The Seattle Washington Temple
- Area: US West
- Members: 278,576 (2025)
- Stakes: 62
- Wards: 412
- Branches: 44
- Total Congregations: 456
- Missions: 7
- Temples: 4 operating 1 under construction 2 announced 7 total
- FamilySearch Centers: 97

The U.S. state of Washington has the sixth most members of The Church of Jesus Christ of Latter-day Saints in the United States. The LDS Church is the 2nd largest denomination in Washington, behind the Roman Catholic Church.

== History ==
Membership in Washington
Year	Membership
1920	1,199
1930	3,443
1940	5,113
1950	11,551
1960	35,701
1970	67,203
1980*	138,000
1990*	189,000
1999	226,411
2009	257,710
2019	289,479
2025	278,576
*Membership was published as a rounded number. Source: Windall J. Ashton; Jim M. Wall, Deseret News, various years, Church Almanac Country Information: Washington

The first branch in Washington was created at Tacoma near the end of 1899, with its first stake being created at Seattle in 1938. Washington's first temple was built in Bellevue in 1980. There are now also temples in Spokane, Richland, and Moses Lake. Temples have been announced in Tacoma and Vancouver.

=== Early membership ===
The first known member of the Church moved to Washington in 1852, with missionaries arriving in Washington Territory from California as early as 1854. Enough converts were baptized along the Lewis River in the southwest portion of the state that a congregation was created in that area. Tensions escalated to the death of one member in 1911, who was given a secret burial at night.

Members of the Church helped construct the Oregon Short Line Railroad in the 1880s. By 1930, nearly two thousand members lived within the state with chapels located in the Puget Sound Region and in Spokane.

In the 1920s and 1930s, local members participated in annual caravans, traveling to attend the Cardston Alberta Temple in Canada, which was the closest temple to the region at the time. Some caravan participants would travel more than 1,600 mi (2,600 km). With the completion of the Idaho Falls Idaho Temple in 1945 temple attendance shifted that direction until the temple near Seattle was dedicated in 1980.

=== Central Washington development ===
Irrigation projects by the United States Bureau of Reclamation in Central Washington saw many members move to the state. Initially, these members settled in the Yakima Valley with branches forming in Yakima and Toppenish drawn by a new Utah-Idaho Sugar Company factory. A branch in Walla Walla was part of the Stake in Union, Oregon.

In 1940, a Spokane businessman and church member was called to be the leader of the Northwestern States Mission. Scattered missionary work had occurred in the region prior to this, but more concentrated missionary activity didn't begin until closer to this time.

As part of the development around the White Bluffs area, a local real estate agent traveled to the Cache Valley in Utah to sell plots of farmland. Some Cache Valley residents had been interested in moving out of the area to farm because farming plots had become too small or scarce to be economically productive. About 15 families moved to White Bluffs and formed a branch there around 1940.

Shortly after settling, church members and others around White Bluffs were forcibly relocated when the U.S. Government confiscated the land to build the Hanford Site as part of the Manhattan Project. Many of the relocated residents moved to nearby farming communities. Meanwhile, construction and wartime activity at Hanford became another means to bring Latter-day Saints into the state.

A large branch formed in Richland and after the war was over, the church was granted a lease from the U.S. Government to build a church building within the city. This church building, located near the city center, was the first non-government construction in Richland since the start of the Hanford Project in 1943. Groundbreaking was in 1949 and the Richland Stake formed as the third stake in Washington a few years later.

After World War II, the Columbia Basin Project resumed to bring water from the Columbia River to the arid land north of Pasco. Many Latter-day Saints from Idaho and Utah settled on this land as new irrigated tracts were opened from the 1950s to the 1980s. Church members were particularly successful because many had prior experience farming in states where they came from, which are also fairly arid. A stake was organized in Moses Lake in 1954 to accommodate this increased membership and Adams County continued to hold the highest rate of church membership in Washington in 2010.

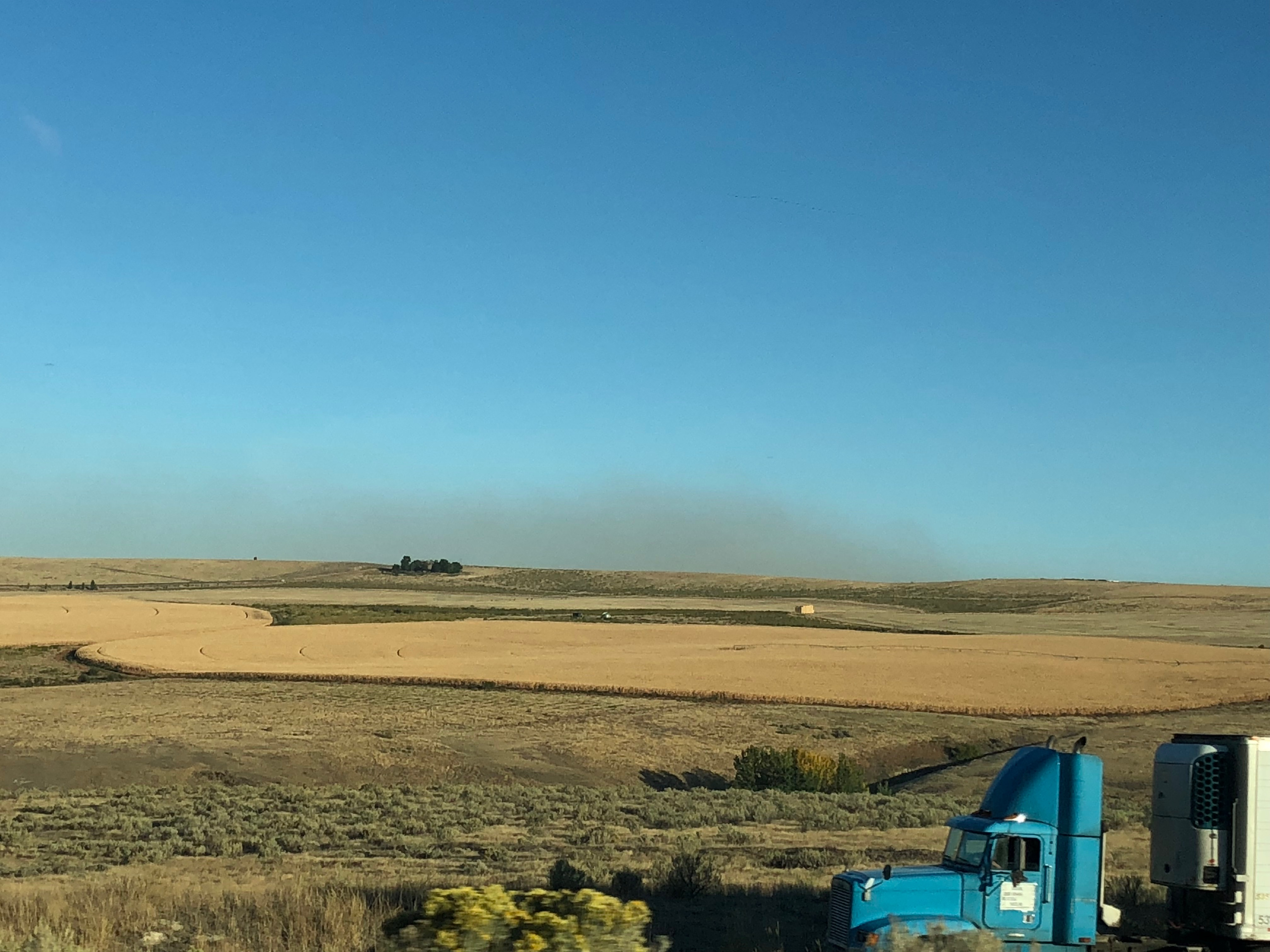
A portion of the church-owned AgriNorthwest farm in the Horse Heaven Hills.

=== Church owned farmland ===
In the 1960s the church-owned Utah and Idaho Sugar Company worked with local investors to acquire and build irrigation infrastructure for farmland in Walla Walla County. This enterprise expanded Benton County in the 1970s and came to be known as AgriNorthwest in 1986 and is an investment property of the church as well as a contributor to the Church Welfare System and other philanthropic activity. AgriNorthwest expanded in the 21st Century by buying more properties in Washington and Oregon.

== County statistics ==
List of LDS Church adherents in each county as of 2010 according to the Association of Religion Data Archives: Note: Each county adherent count reflects meetinghouse location of congregation and not by location of residence. Census count reflects location of residence which may skew percent of population where adherents reside in a different county as their congregational meetinghouse.

County	Congregations	Adherents	% of Population
Adams	9	2,245	11.99
Asotin	2	1,457	6.74
Benton	31	14,294	8.16
Chelan	7	2,777	3.83
Clallam	7	3,102	4.34
Clark	37	20,793	4.89
Columbia	1	286	7.01
Cowlitz	7	4,513	4.41
Douglas	3	797	2.07
Ferry	1	296	3.92
Franklin	19	7,338	9.39
Garfield	0		
Grant	19	7,562	8.49
Grays Harbor	6	3,254	4.47
Island	4	2,335	2.97
Jefferson	2	876	2.93
King	110	56,985	2.95
Kitsap	19	11,093	4.42
Kittitas	5	1,702	4.16
Klickitat	2	945	4.65
Lewis	7	4,304	5.70
Lincoln	1	215	2.03
Mason	4	2,587	4.26
Okanogan	4	1,153	2.80
Pacific	2	806	3.85
Pend Oreille	1	112	0.86
Pierce	52	33,152	4.17
San Juan	1	323	2.05
Skagit	6	3,870	3.31
Skamania	1	409	3.70
Snohomish	41	22,684	3.18
Spokane	48	24,246	5.15
Stevens	4	1,829	4.20
Thurston	18	10,774	4.27
Wahkiakum	1	212	5.33
Walla Walla	6	2,468	4.20
Whatcom	10	5,438	2.70
Whitman	5	1,792	4.00
Yakima	17	8,243	3.39

== Stakes ==
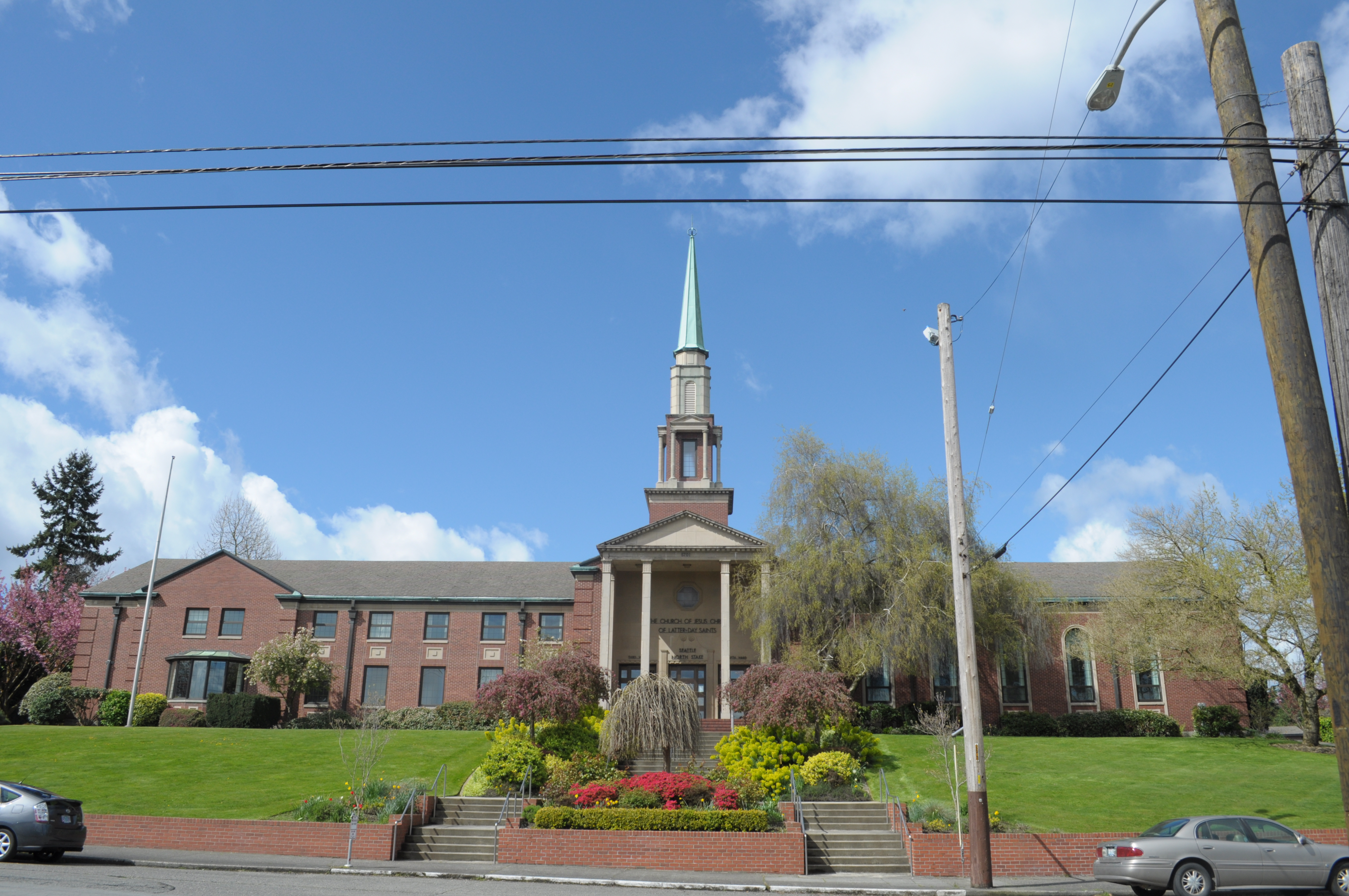
Seattle North Stake meetinghouse of The Church of Jesus Christ of Latter-day Saints

As of January 2026, Washington had the following stakes:

Stake	Organized	Mission	Temple
Arlington Washington	24 Oct 2010	Washington Everett	Seattle Washington
Auburn Washington	28 Nov 1982	Washington Seattle	Seattle Washington
Bellevue Washington South	15 Mar 1981	Washington Seattle	Seattle Washington
Bellevue Washington	1 Dec 1963	Washington Seattle	Seattle Washington
Bellingham Washington	10 May 1981	Washington Everett	Vancouver British Columbia
Bothell Washington	22 Nov 1981	Washington Seattle	Seattle Washington
Bremerton Washington	19 Jun 1960	Washington Tacoma	Seattle Washington
Centralia Washington	10 Sep 1978	Washington Vancouver	Portland Oregon
Colville Washington	18 Oct 1981	Washington Spokane	Spokane Washington
Elma Washington	28 Aug 1983	Washington Vancouver	Seattle Washington
Enumclaw Washington	13 Mar 2016	Washington Seattle	Seattle Washington
Ephrata Washington	15 Jun 1980	Washington Yakima	Moses Lake Washington
Everett Washington	25 Oct 1970	Washington Everett	Seattle Washington
Federal Way Washington	20 Nov 1977	Washington Seattle	Seattle Washington
Gig Harbor Washington	28 Sep 1952	Washington Tacoma	Seattle Washington
Graham Washington	18 May 2003	Washington Tacoma	Seattle Washington
Kennewick Washington East	31 Oct 1982	Washington Kennewick	Columbia River Washington
Kennewick Washington	24 Oct 1976	Washington Kennewick	Columbia River Washington
Kent Washington	14 Oct 1984	Washington Seattle	Seattle Washington
Lacey Washington	14 Sep 1997	Washington Tacoma	Seattle Washington
Lakewood Washington	20 Oct 1985	Washington Tacoma	Seattle Washington
Lewiston Idaho North (Note: Stake located outside Washington with congregation(s) meeting in Washington)	19 Oct 1958	Idaho Coeur d'Alene	Spokane Washington
Longview Washington	4 Feb 1973	Washington Vancouver	Portland Oregon
Lynnwood Washington	14 May 1978	Washington Everett	Seattle Washington
Maple Valley Washington	22 Mar 1998	Washington Seattle	Seattle Washington
Marysville Washington	29 Mar 1981	Washington Everett	Seattle Washington
Moses Lake Washington East	1 Jun 2025	Washington Yakima	Moses Lake Washington
Moses Lake Washington	18 Apr 1954	Washington Yakima	Moses Lake Washington
Mount Vernon Washington	30 Jun 1963	Washington Everett	Seattle Washington
Oak Harbor Washington	23 Apr 2017	Washington Everett	Seattle Washington
Olympia Washington	27 Aug 1967	Washington Tacoma	Seattle Washington
Othello Washington	12 Aug 1979	Washington Yakima	Moses Lake Washington
Pasco Washington North	20 Feb 2011	Washington Kennewick	Columbia River Washington
Pasco Washington	21 May 1967	Washington Kennewick	Columbia River Washington
Port Angeles Washington	23 Feb 1992	Washington Tacoma	Seattle Washington
Pullman Washington	29 Sep 2024	Washington Spokane	Spokane Washington
Rainier Oregon	8 Mar 1992	Washington Vancouver	Portland Oregon
Renton Washington	3 May 1970	Washington Seattle	Seattle Washington
Richland Washington South	26 Feb 2023	Washington Kennewick	Columbia River Washington
Richland Washington	25 Jun 1950	Washington Kennewick	Columbia River Washington
Ridgefield Washington	24 Jan 2016	Washington Vancouver	Portland Oregon
Sammamish Valley Washington	29 May 1977	Washington Seattle	Seattle Washington
Seattle Washington North	19 May 1957	Washington Everett	Seattle Washington
Seattle Washington	31 Jul 1938	Washington Seattle	Seattle Washington
Selah Washington	29 Apr 1979	Washington Yakima	Moses Lake Washington
Silverdale Washington	26 Aug 1979	Washington Tacoma	Seattle Washington
Snohomish Washington	28 Jun 1992	Washington Everett	Seattle Washington
South Hill Washington	28 Nov 1982	Washington Tacoma	Seattle Washington
Spokane Washington East	17 Oct 1971	Washington Spokane	Spokane Washington
Spokane Washington Mount Spokane	18 Jun 2016	Washington Spokane	Spokane Washington
Spokane Washington North	7 Jan 1979	Washington Spokane	Spokane Washington
Spokane Washington	29 Jun 1947	Washington Spokane	Spokane Washington
Spokane Washington Valley	3 Jun 2001	Washington Spokane	Spokane Washington
Spokane Washington West	12 Jan 1992	Washington Spokane	Spokane Washington
Sumner Washington	17 Jan 1971	Washington Tacoma	Seattle Washington
Tacoma Washington	19 Aug 1979	Washington Tacoma	Seattle Washington
The Dalles Oregon	26 Jun 1977	Washington Yakima	Portland Oregon
Vancouver Washington	1 Dec 1963	Washington Vancouver	Portland Oregon
Vancouver Washington East	17 May 1998	Washington Vancouver	Portland Oregon
Vancouver Washington North	3 Nov 1985	Washington Vancouver	Portland Oregon
Vancouver Washington West	5 Nov 1978	Washington Vancouver	Portland Oregon
Walla Walla Washington	11 Mar 1979	Washington Kennewick	Columbia River Washington
Wenatchee Washington	29 Jan 1967	Washington Yakima	Moses Lake Washington
West Richland Washington	4 Nov 2012	Washington Kennewick	Columbia River Washington
Yakima Washington	24 May 1959	Washington Yakima	Columbia River Washington

== Missions ==
On July 26, 1897, the Northwestern States Mission was organized to search out Latter-day Saints who had moved to Washington, Oregon, and Montana. On January 1, 1968, The Pacific Northwest Mission was created with Joe E. Whitesides as president. On June 10, 1970, its name changed to the Washington Mission and ultimately the Washington Seattle Mission on June 20, 1974. As of 2023, Washington is home to seven missions, three of which are east of the Cascade Mountains, and four are on the west side.

Mission	Organized
Washington Everett Mission	July 1, 2001
Washington Kennewick Mission	July 1, 2002
Washington Seattle Mission	January 1, 1968
Washington Spokane Mission	July 1, 1978
Washington Tacoma Mission	July 1, 1990
Washington Vancouver Mission	July 1, 2013
Washington Yakima Mission	July 1, 2015

== Temples ==
Temples in and near Washington ()

Temples in Washington or with districts
extending into Washington
= Operating
= Under construction
= Announced
= Temporarily Closed

Washington currently has four temples in operation. A fifth temple, the Tacoma Washington Temple, was announced by President Russell M. Nelson in his concluding talk of the Sunday afternoon session of the October 2022 General Conference on Sunday, October 2, 2022, to be built in Tacoma, Washington. A sixth temple, the Vancouver Washington Temple, was announced October 1, 2023. In addition, members in the Bellingham Washington Stake are served by the Vancouver British Columbia Temple and members in and around Vancouver, Washington are served by the Portland Oregon Temple.

19. Seattle Washington Temple; Official website; News & images	
Location: Announced: Groundbreaking: Dedicated: Size:	Bellevue, Washington, United States; November 15, 1975 by Spencer W. Kimball; May 27, 1978 by Marion G. Romney; November 17, 1980 by Spencer W. Kimball; 110,000 sq ft (10,000 m^{2}) on a 23.5-acre (9.5 ha) site - designed by Emil B. Fetzer
59. Spokane Washington Temple; Official website; News & images	
Location: Announced: Groundbreaking: Dedicated: Size: Style:	Spokane Valley, Washington, United States; August 13, 1998 by Gordon B. Hinckley; October 10, 1998 by F. Melvin Hammond; August 21, 1999 by Gordon B. Hinckley; 10,700 sq ft (990 m^{2}) on a 2-acre (0.81 ha) site Classic modern, single-spire design
107. Columbia River Washington Temple; Official website; News & images	
Location: Announced: Groundbreaking: Dedicated: Size: Style:	Richland, Washington, United States; April 2, 2000 by Gordon B. Hinckley; October 28, 2000 by Stephen A. West; November 18, 2001 by Gordon B. Hinckley; 16,880 sq ft (1,568 m^{2}) on a 2.88-acre (1.17 ha) site Classic modern, single-spire design - designed by A & E Services, Joseph E. Marty Architect
182. Moses Lake Washington Temple; Official website; News & images	
Location: Announced: Groundbreaking: Dedicated: Size:	Moses Lake, Washington, United States; 7 April 2019 by Russell M. Nelson; 10 October 2020 by David L. Stapleton; 17 September 2023 by Quentin L. Cook; 28,933 sq ft (2,688.0 m^{2}) on a 17.2-acre (7.0 ha) site
268. Vancouver Washington Temple (Under construction); Official website; News & images	
Location: Announced: Groundbreaking: Size:	Camas, Washington, United States; 1 October 2023 by Russell M. Nelson; 23 August 2025 by Mark A. Bragg; 43,000 sq ft (4,000 m^{2}) on a 15.11-acre (6.11 ha) site
313. Tacoma Washington Temple (Site announced); Official website; News & images	
Location: Announced: Size:	Federal Way, Washington; 2 October 2022 by Russell M. Nelson; 45,000 sq ft (4,200 m^{2}) on a 11.6-acre (4.7 ha) site
384. Marysville Washington Temple (Announced); Official website; News & images	
Location: Announced:	Marysville, Washington; 19 April 2026 by Dallin H. Oaks

== See also ==
- Religion in Washington (state)
- The Church of Jesus Christ of Latter-day Saints membership statistics (United States)
