= Vancouver Temple =

The Vancouver Temple may refer to one of the following temples of the Church of Jesus Christ of Latter-day Saints

- Vancouver British Columbia Temple in Canada
- Vancouver Washington Temple in the United States
