= Kelsey Creek (Washington) =

Creek in Bellevue, Washington, United States

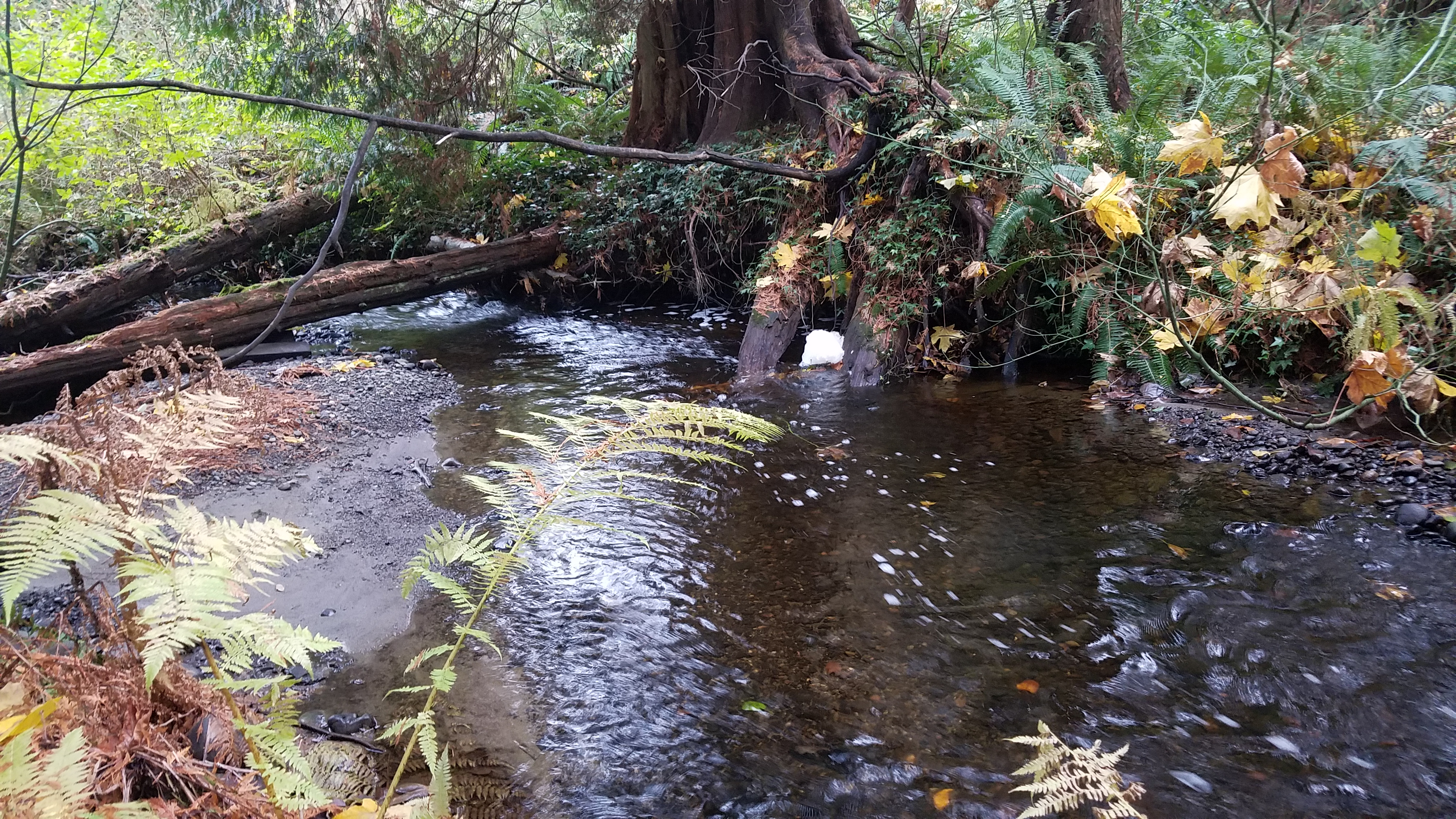
- Kelsey Creek in Bellevue's Crossroads neighborhood

- Location of the mouth of Kelsey Creek in Washington Kelsey Creek (Washington) (the United States)

Location
- Country: United States
- State: Washington
- Region: King County

Physical characteristics
- Source: Lake Hills Greenbelt
  - location: Bellevue, Washington
- Mouth
  - location: Lake Washington
  - coordinates: 47°36′01″N 122°09′58″W
  - elevation: 16 ft (4.9 m)
- Basin size: 17.0 sq mi (44 km^{2})
- Discharge
  - average: 22.5 cu ft/s (0.64 m^{3}/s)
  - minimum: 1.9 cu ft/s (0.054 m^{3}/s)
  - maximum: 832 cu ft/s (23.6 m^{3}/s)

Kelsey Creek is a creek in Bellevue, Washington on Seattle's Eastside. Originating in the wetlands in the Lake Hills greenbelt between Phantom Lake and Larsen Lake, it flows north and west through the Crossroads neighborhood and then south to Kelsey Creek Park where it turns west and becomes the Mercer Slough just west of Interstate 405. The centerpiece of the largest wetland adjacent to Lake Washington at 367 acres (149 ha), the slough empties into the East Channel of Lake Washington at Interstate 90.

== Drainage basin ==
The Kelsey Creek drainage basin is about 10,870 acres (4,400 ha), including about 75% of the city of Bellevue in addition to a portion of Redmond. Tributaries include Valley Creek, Goff Creek, the West Tributary, Sturtevant Creek, Richards Creek, East Creek, and Sunset Creek. Kelsey Creek flows into the head of the Mercer Slough through a large concrete culvert which has been built to allow salmon to ascend easily via a few short drops of the creek.

== History ==
The Duwamish, whose main settlements were located in what is present day Renton and Seattle, maintained a small outpost settlement called Satskal along the Mercer Slough.

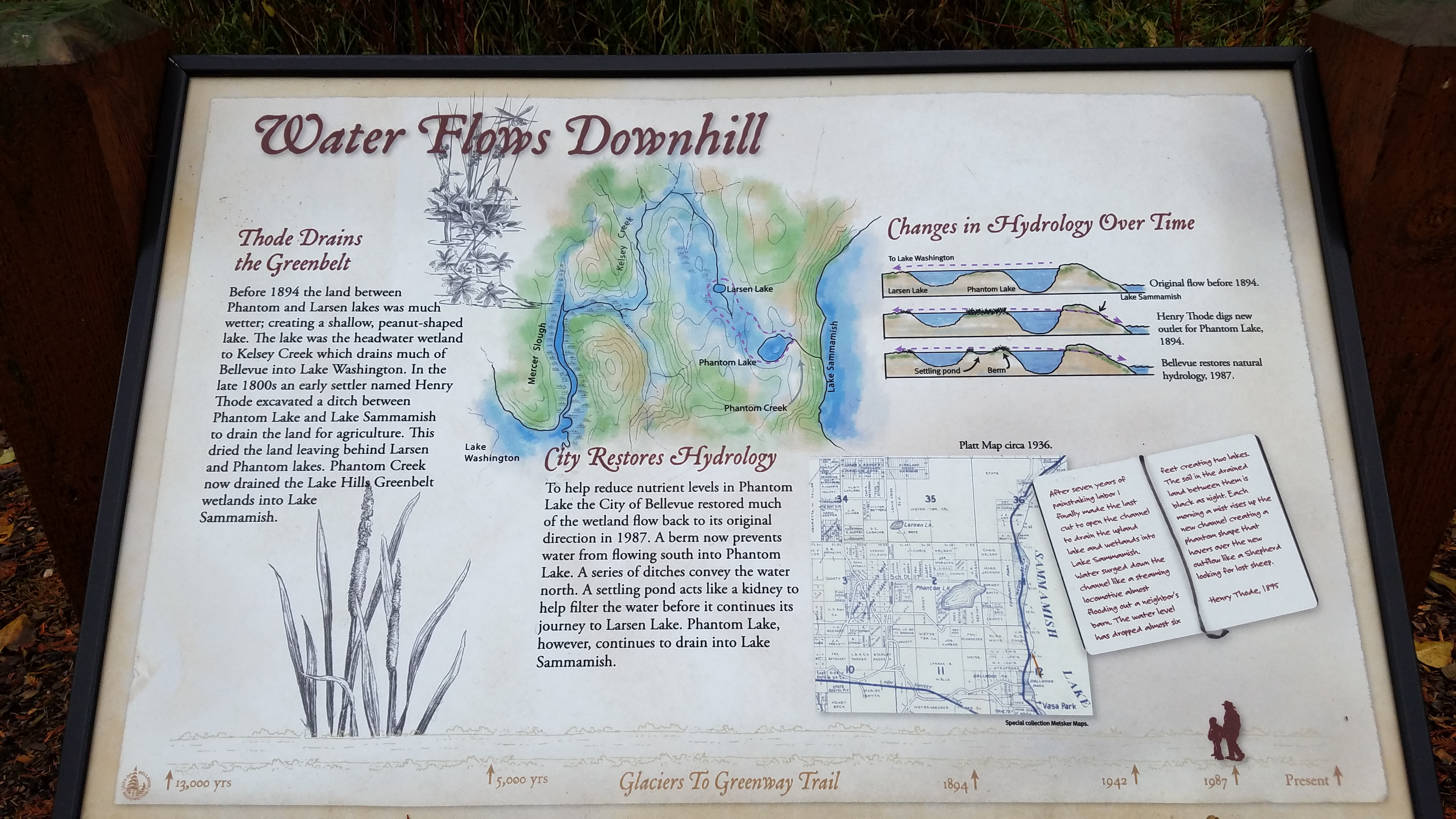
An informational placard describing the recent hydrologic history of the Lake Hills greenbelt and its effect on Kelsey Creek

Originally the Kelsey Creek drainage basin included what is now Phantom Lake. In the late 1800s, however, farmer Henry Thode redirected the Phantom Lake outlet to Lake Sammamish, resulting in reduced water flow to Kelsey Creek.

For centuries, the Mercer Slough wetlands had been a swamp, marsh, and shallow water area, with the Mercer Slough itself being effectively a shallow inlet of Lake Washington. In 1894, a small sawmill operated at the upper end of the slough and both logs and processed timber would be floated down the slough to Lake Washington. At the time, the slough was both wide enough and deep enough to accommodate log rafts, launches, tugs, small steamers, and stern-wheelers.

Following the completion of the Lake Washington Ship Canal and Hiram M. Chittenden Locks in 1917, the water level of Lake Washington was lowered 8.8 feet (2.7 m) exposing the lake bed along the course of the present-day slough. The Mercer Slough was partially dredged in the 1920s to make it navigable to small watercraft. Today, canoes can be rented to explore the lower waterway.

The King County government and City of Bellevue began acquiring parcels in the Mercer Slough in 1957 for preservation of the wetlands and surrounding natural areas. By 1990, 311 acres (126 ha) had been purchased.

Kelsey Creek gallery
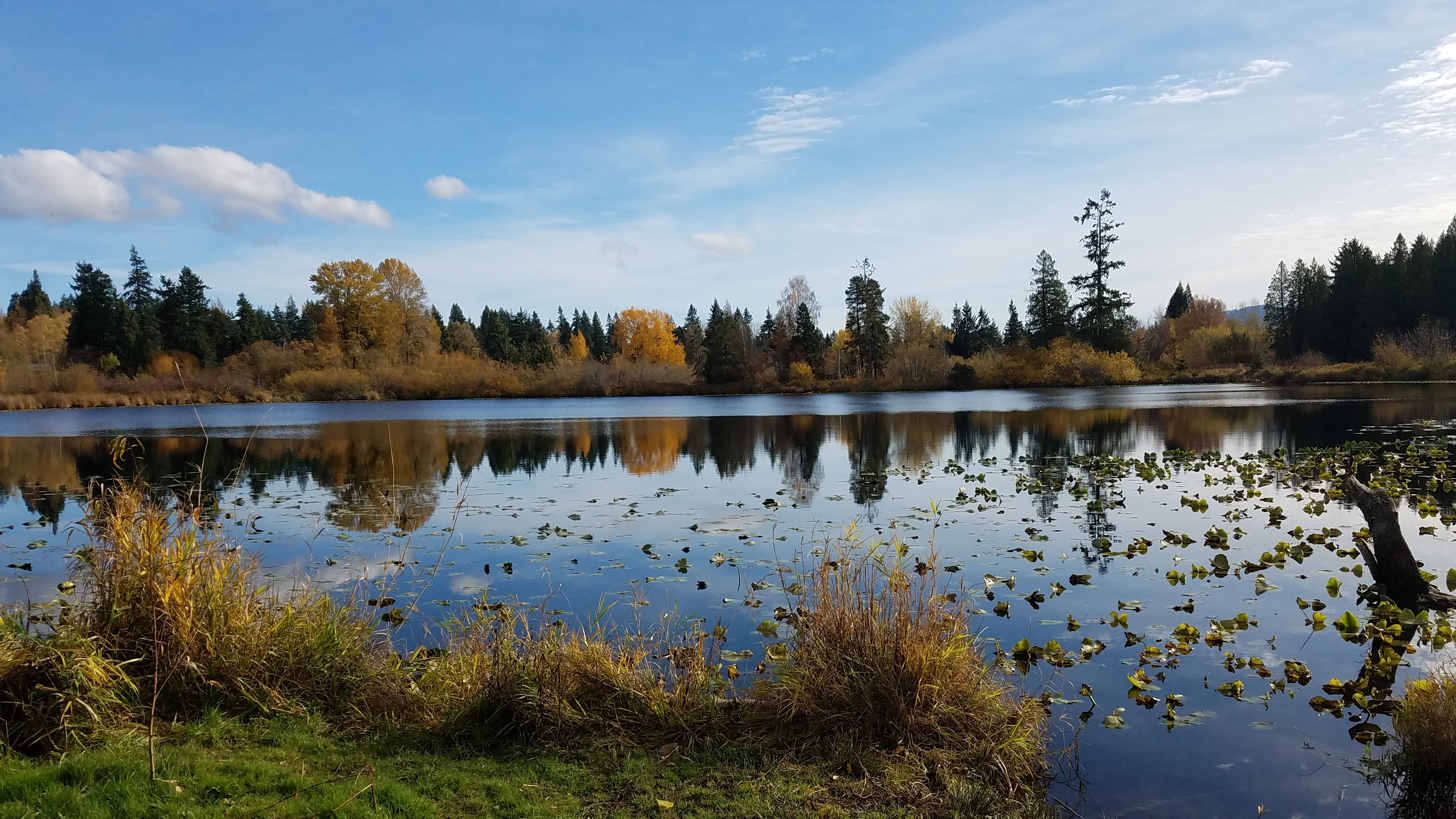
Larsen Lake, near the Kelsey Creek source and a part of the Kelsey Creek drainage basin

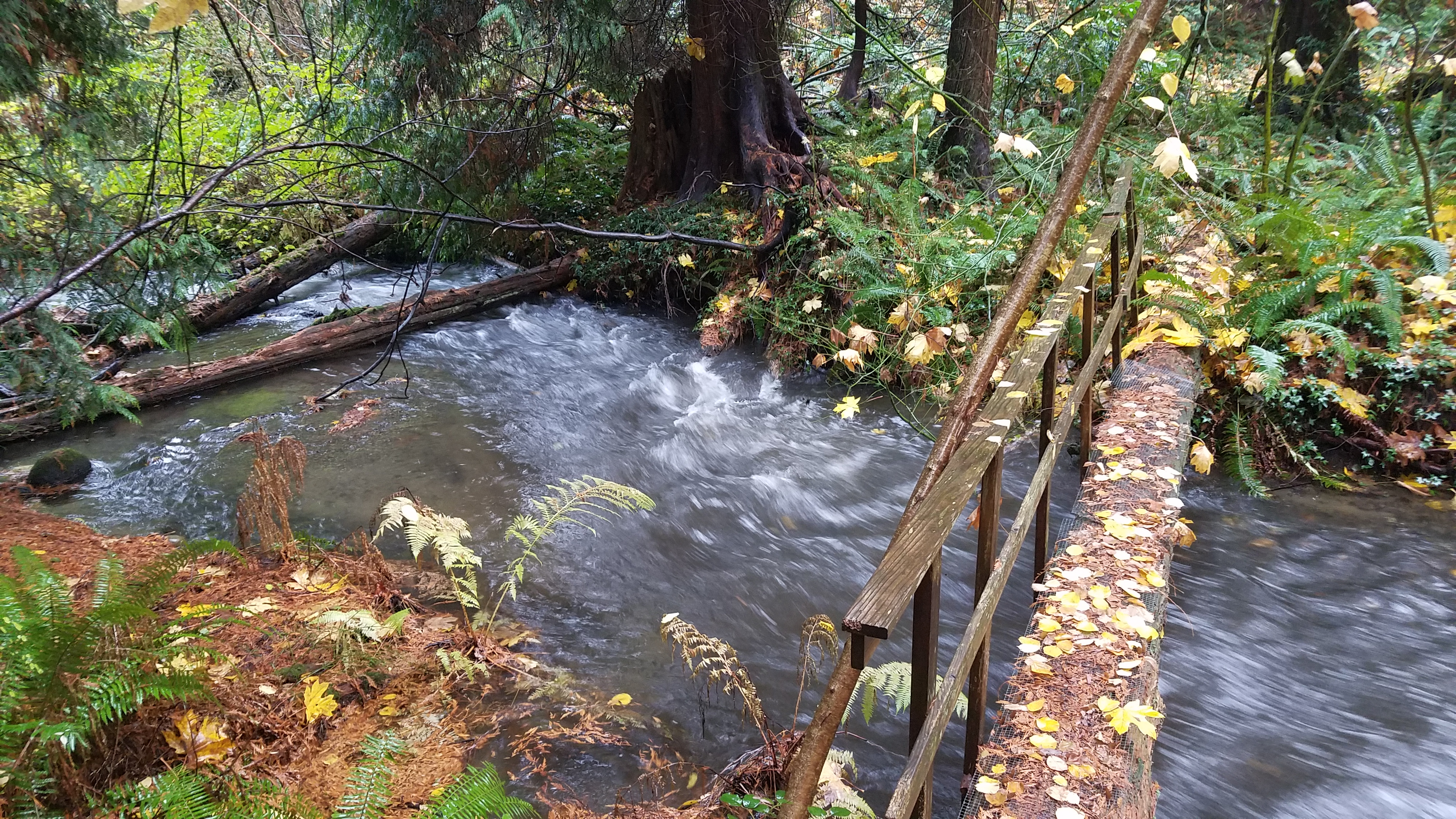
Kelsey Creek in the Crossroads area following a fall rain storm

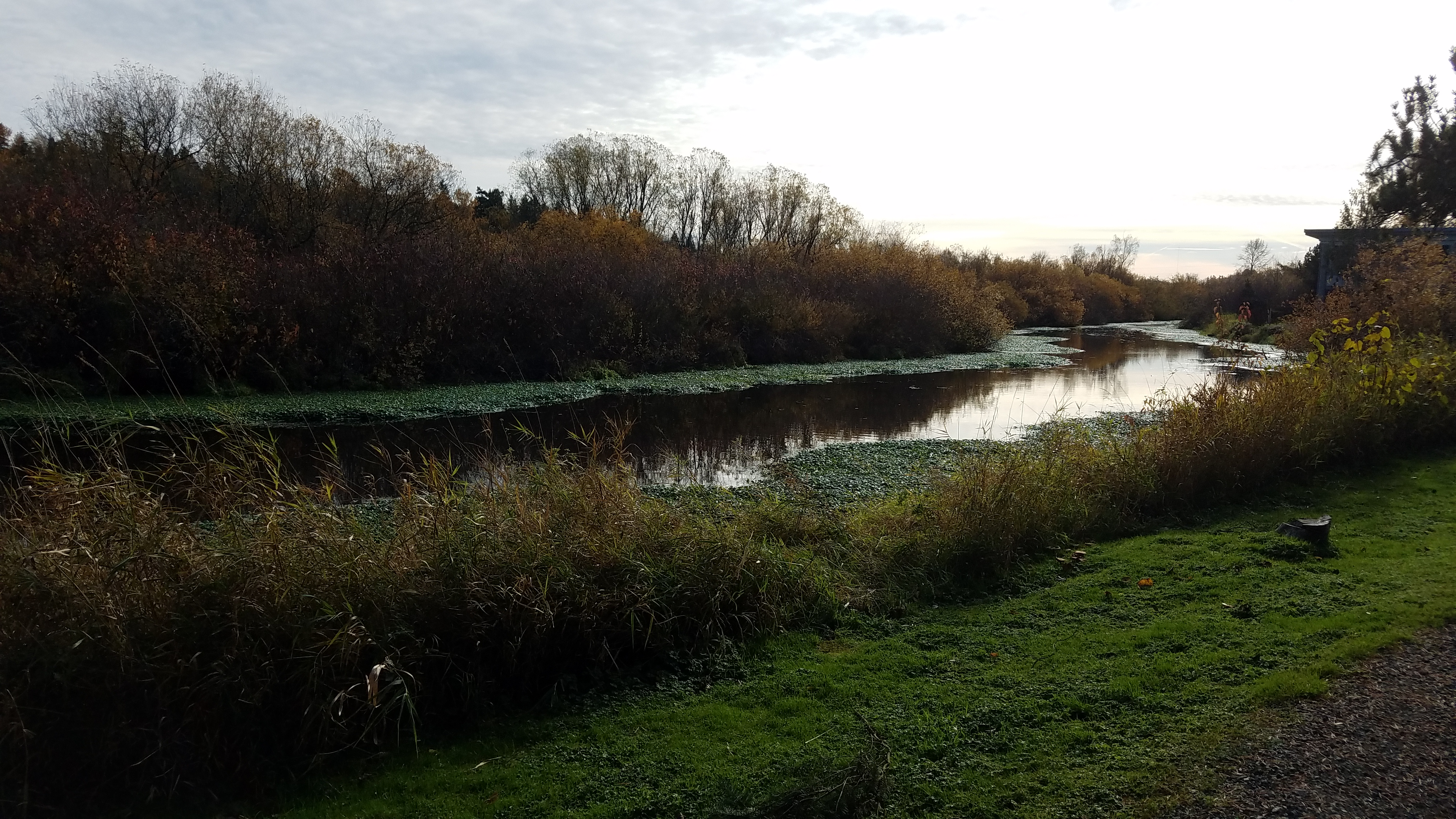
The Mercer Slough, about 1 mile (1.6 kilometres) upstream from its terminus at Lake Washington

== See also ==
- List of rivers of Washington (state)
