= Lake Hills, Bellevue =

Neighborhood in Bellevue, Washington, United States

Coordinates: 47°36′12″N 122°07′51″W

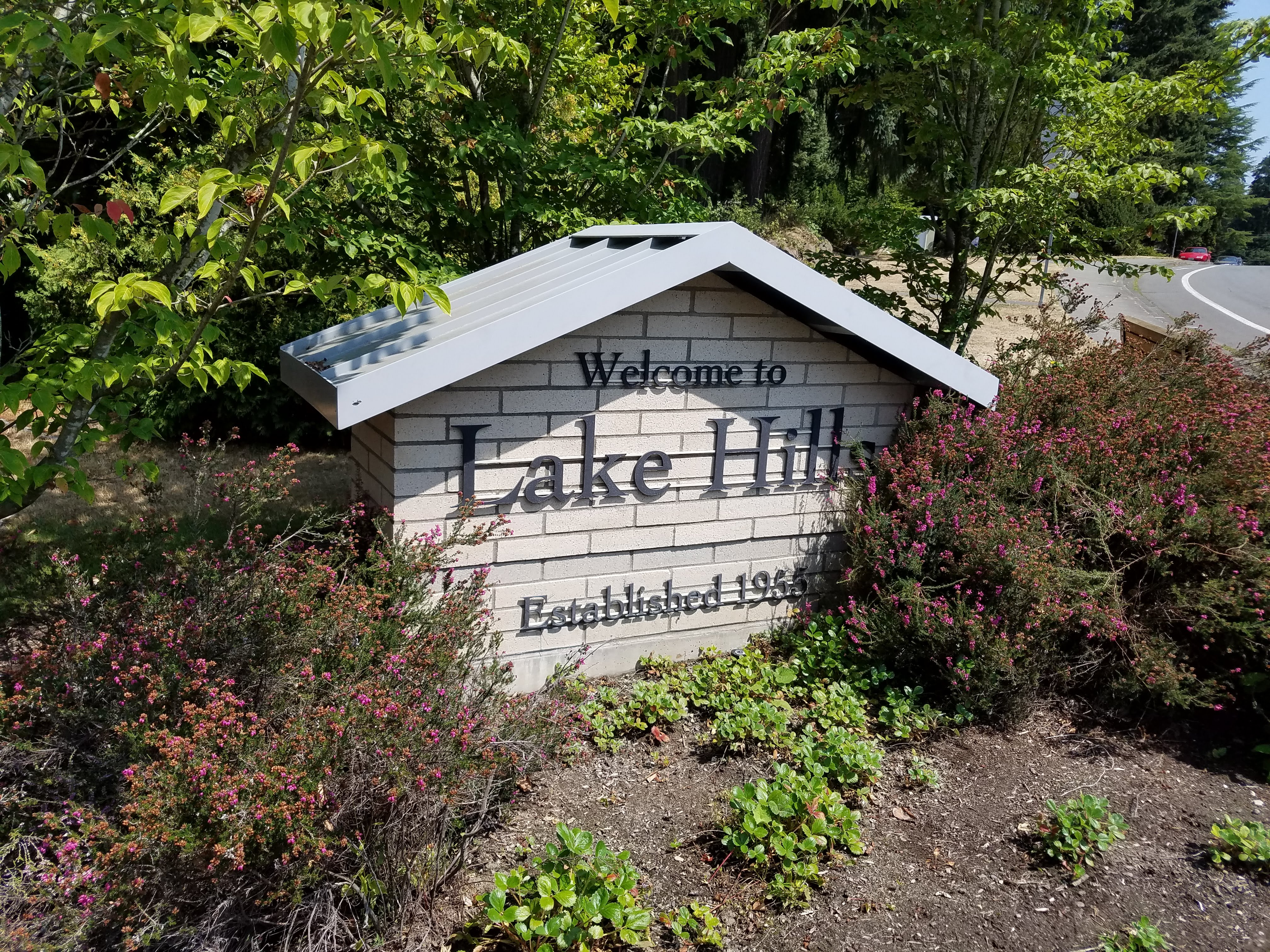
Lake Hills neighborhood sign on the western end of Lake Hills Boulevard.

Lake Hills is a neighborhood in Bellevue, Washington. It lies to the south of the Crossroads and north of the Eastgate neighborhoods.

In the early 1900s, Japanese immigrants farmed the part of Lake Hills between present day Larsen Lake and Phantom Lake. This agricultural activity was abruptly curtailed following the Japanese American Internment in 1942, and was eventually replaced by suburban housing. Lake Hills was annexed into Bellevue in 1969.

Today the Lake Hills neighborhood contains Bellevue College, the Lake Hills Greenbelt Urban Demonstration Garden (also known as the Bellevue Demonstration Garden), and Larsen Lake.

Landscape and vistas
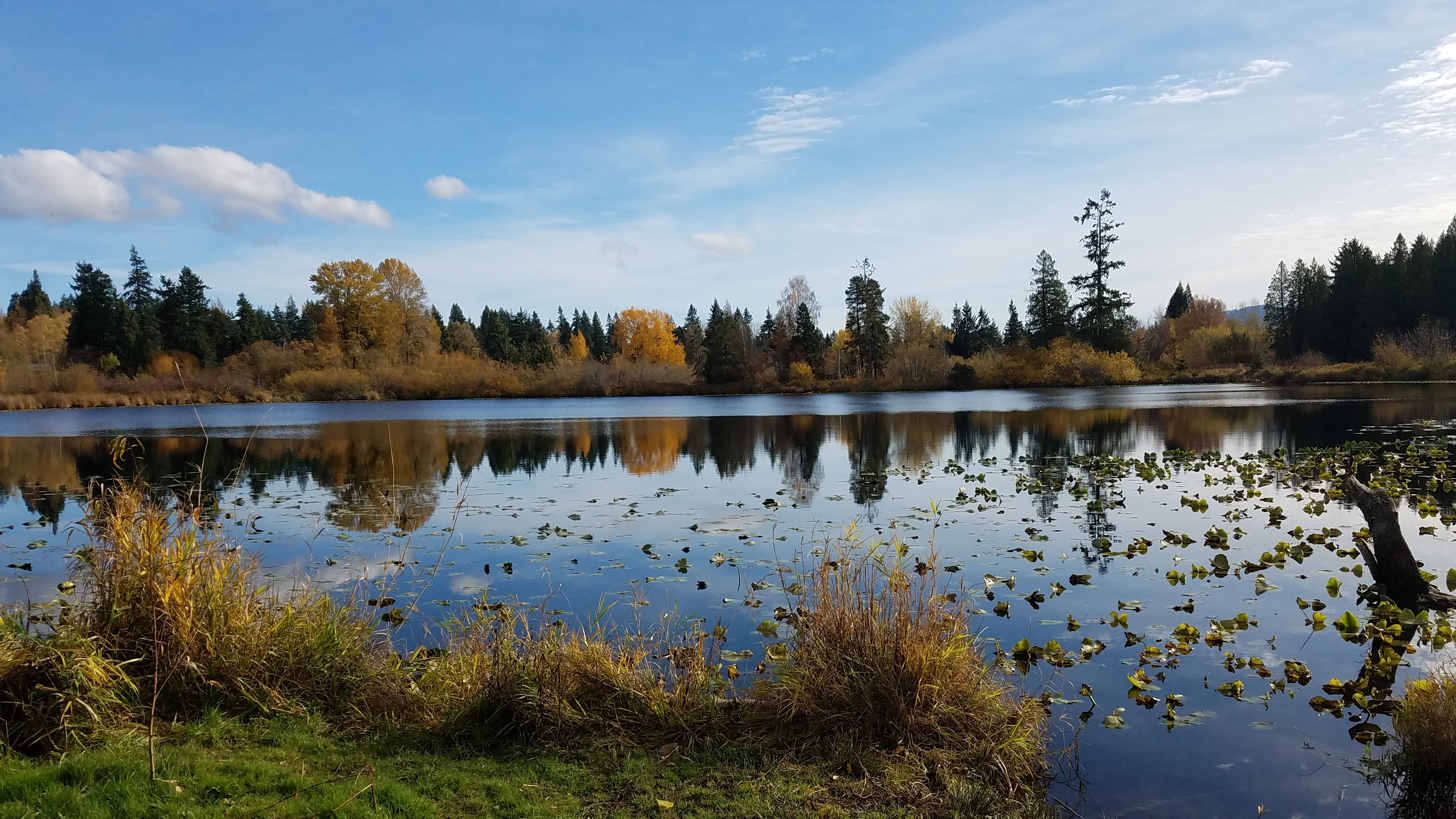
Larsen Lake in the Lake Hills neighborhood of Bellevue, Washington

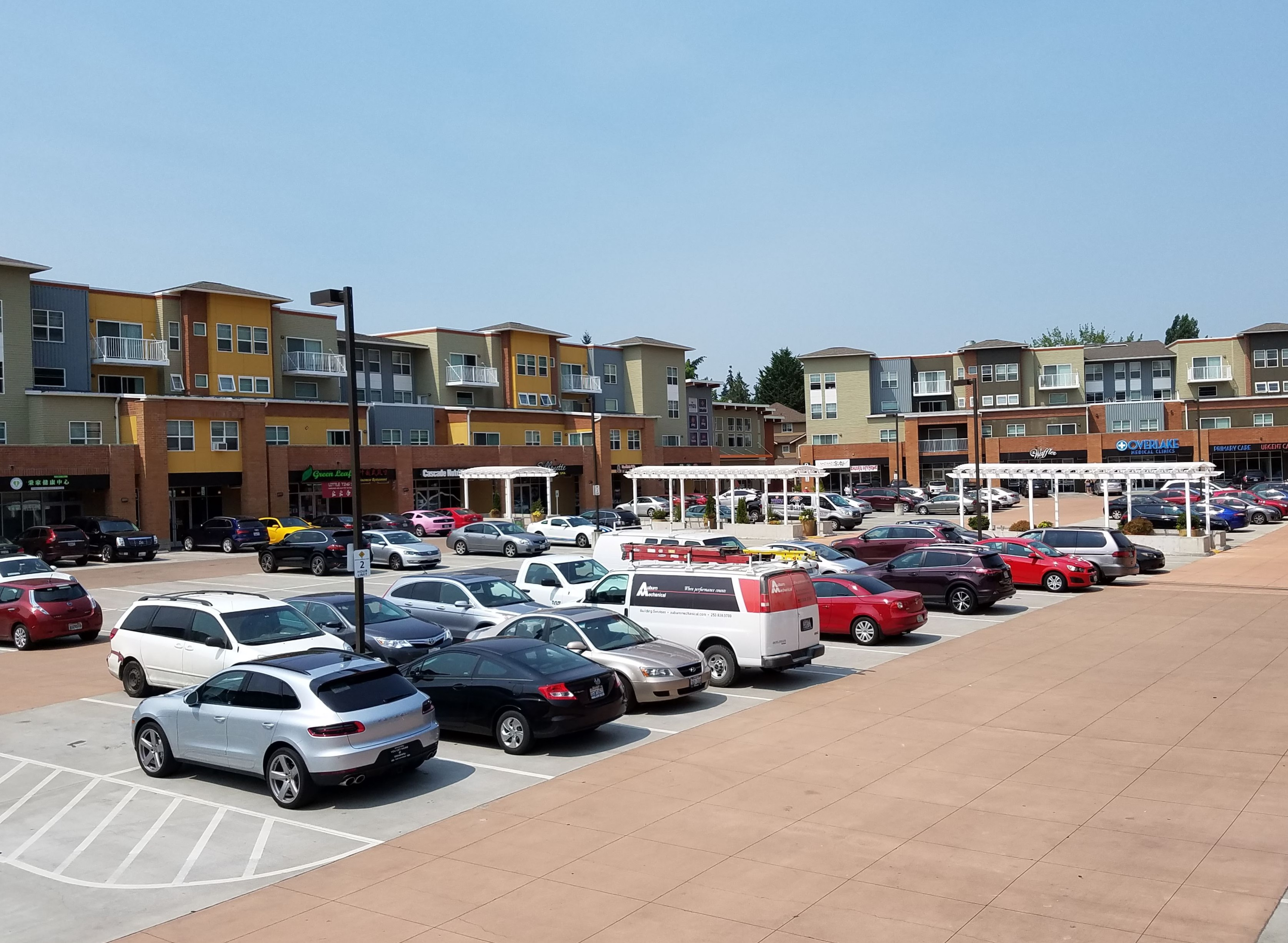
Bellevue's Lake Hills Village in 2018
