= Greenbank Farm =

Community farm in Washington, United States

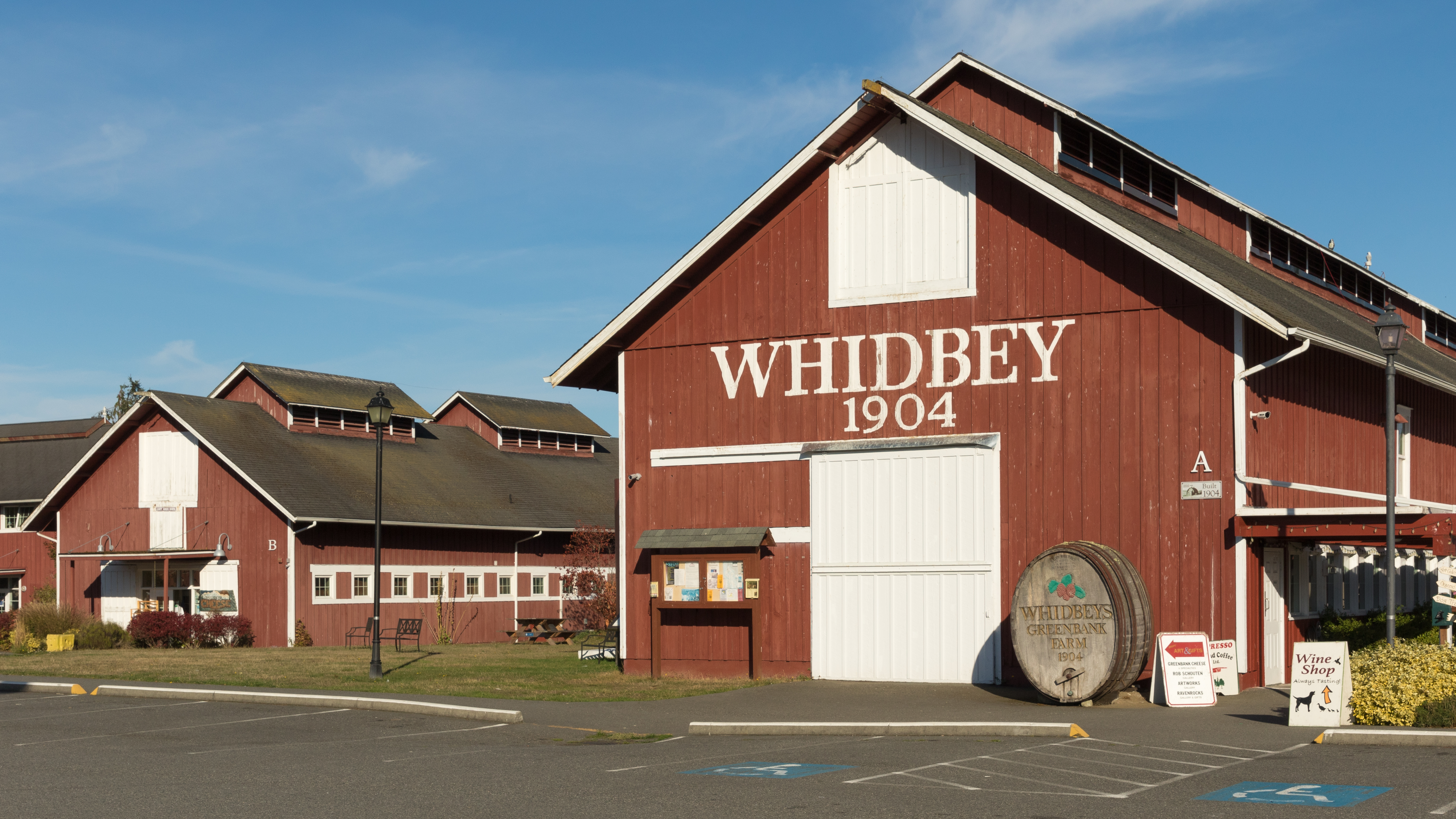
- The front of the main barn
- Town/City: Greenbank, Washington
- Coordinates: 48°06′25″N 122°34′26″W
- Owner: Port of Coupeville

Greenbank Farm is a tourist attraction and community farm in the area of Greenbank on Whidbey Island, run by the Port of Coupeville. Founded in 1904 the farm developed until 1940 when it was sold to a loganberry farmer. By 1970 the farm was the largest Loganberry farm in the United States. In 1977, the farm was sold to community governments to save it from being developed for residential use.

Today, the farm leases land to local farmers, is a history tourist attraction, serves as an Island meeting place and produces several special events. Greenbank Farm also hosts several small businesses and offers educational gardens that are maintained by volunteers from the Island County Master Gardeners Foundation. Its location is on one of the thinnest parts of Whidbey, offers a unique vantage point from its walking trails. To Whidbey residents, it is the divider between the North and South Whidbey.

== History ==
Greenbank Farm was founded in 1904 by Calvin Philips and his family as a model dairy farm with to goal of bringing commerce to Whidbey Island. The now iconic barn was built the same year. In 1906, 125 acres of land was cleared along what is currently Highway 525 to make room for the expanding cattle herd. In the early 1930s the farm suffered a tragic loss when the cattle herd was struck by tuberculosis. The entire herd was destroyed. The farm limped along until it was sold in the 1940s. At this point it consisted of several buildings and 522 acres of land.

The new owner John Molz decided to grow loganberries, a hybrid between blackberries and raspberries. Greenbank farm became the largest loganberry producer in the United States with 125 acres if berry bushes. Molz started to produce Loganberry wine. Molz was a founder of a winery in Seattle named Pommerelle. He sold his Logan berry wine under this label. Molz ran the farm until 1984. The parent company Pommerelle was sold, which included the farm. Pommerelle’s name was changed to Ste. Michelle Vintners. In 1987, the farm underwent a revitalization under the new management. They added a new visitor center and increased the rate of production. This effort fell short and the farm was in trouble by 1995. The company planned to sell the entire lot for development. The local community rallied against this proposal.

In 1997, the farm was bought in a joint effort between Island County, the Port of Coupeville https://portoc.org, and The Nature Conservancy. The Port of Coupeville acquired the 151 acres of farmland, while the County and Conservancy acquired the woodlands.

== Today ==
According to the 2009 Master plan by the Port of Coupeville, Greenbank farm “is a special place that should be preserved for generations to come.” The farm represents the residents of Whidbey Island and their values “such as conservation and historic presentation”. The plan calls for the plan to move into the future as a model for community supported agriculture, and a gathering place to find a connection with the community.

== Tourism ==
Greenbank Farm hosts several activities for visitors. The farm has several trails running through and around the open fields. The large historic, “Whidbey 1904 Barn” is a venue for weddings, social gatherings and events. The most notable events are the Tour de Whidbey, the Harvest Faire, and the Holiday Market. The farm also hosts several weddings and smaller events each year. The Shops at Greenbank Farm, independent tenants of the Port of Coupeville, feature Old Spots Bistro, Fire of the Heart Gallery, Greenbank Farm Wine Shop, Greenbank Cheese Shop, Pup Stop, Island Antiques & Collectibles, and Whidbey Camano Land Trust.

== Geography ==
Greenbank Farm sits prominently in Greenbank, 13 minutes south of Coupeville and 10 minutes north of Freeland on one of the thinnest parts of Whidbey Island. This gives the farm the unique view of Puget Sound on both sides of the Island. While only a third of the way up the island, it is considered by many residents to be the dividing landmark between North and South Whidbey.

== Solar Farm ==
In 2011, with the help of Puget Sound Energy (with their green power grant) and local citizens and investors, the farm installed the infrastructure for a large solar array. At the time, they could not afford to fill the entire array with solar panels but built the infrastructure with expansion in mind. They produced a max of 25.1 kilowatt hours. As of 2019, the solar farm is owned by 36 investors from 4 different groups and generates a max of 152 kilowatt hours.
