= Vancouver Washington Temple =

- Under construction
- Aerial view of the temple under construction in October 2026
- Interactive map of Vancouver Washington Temple
- Number: 268
- Site: 15.11 acres (6.11 ha)
- Floor area: 43,000 ft^{2} (4,000 m^{2})
- Official website • News & images

Additional information
- Announced: 1 October 2023, by Russell M. Nelson
- Groundbreaking: 23 August 2025, by Mark A. Bragg
- Location: Camas, Washington, United States
- Coordinates: 45.6075°N 122.4695°W

Temples in and near Washington
- = Operating
- = Under construction
- = Announced
- = Temporarily Closed

The Vancouver Washington Temple is a temple of the Church of Jesus Christ of Latter-day Saints under construction on the border of Vancouver and Camas, Washington. Church president Russell M. Nelson announced the intent to construct the temple on October 1, 2023, during general conference. When completed, it will be Clark County's first temple, the state of Washington's sixth, and the Portland metropolitan area's second. The planned structure will be three stories and reach 267 feet in total height, with a spire of 66 feet. On August 23, 2025, Mark A. Bragg, a church general authority, presided over groundbreaking ceremonies.

== History ==
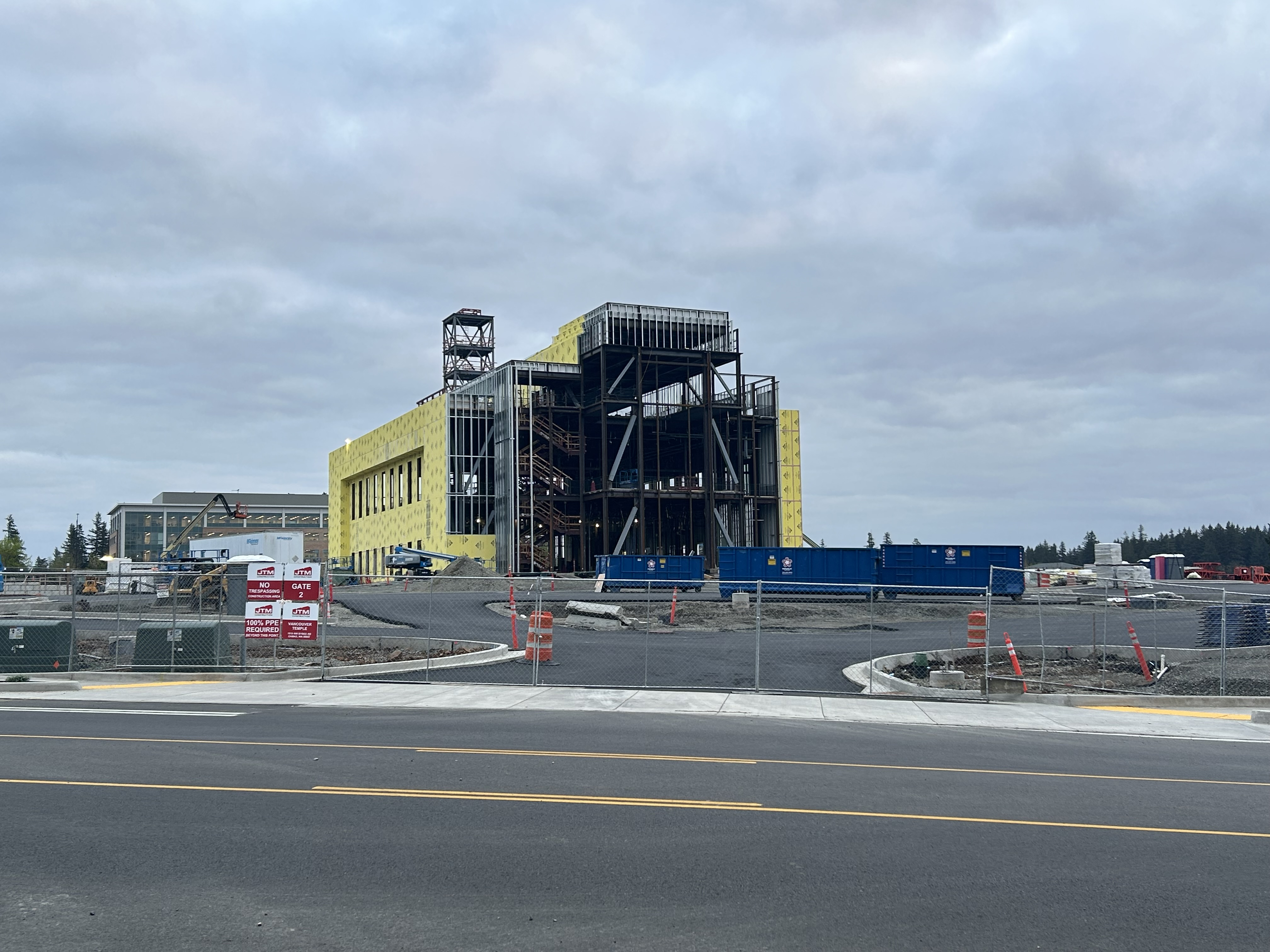
The temple under construction in April 2026.

The church's presence in Washington originated in 1854 when missionaries then working in California received assignments to the Washington and Oregon territories. The missionaries had sufficient converts to establish a congregation north of present-day Vancouver beside the Lewis River, which flows into the Columbia River. During the 1880s, numerous church members contributed labor to Northern Pacific Oregon Short Line railroad construction projects throughout Washington. By 1930, Washington's church membership reached 1,900, distributed among eight congregations in Seattle, Spokane, Olympia, and Everett. The 1940s completion of the Grand Coulee Dam along the Columbia River brought additional members to the state. Before the Portland Oregon Temple began operations in Lake Oswego, Oregon, in 1989, Clark County members undertook 600-mile trips to the Oakland California Temple.

The intent to construct a temple in the Vancouver area was announced by church president Russell M. Nelson on October 1, 2023, during general conference. It was one of twenty new temple locations announced at the conference. Washington's church membership at that time was approximately 280,000, in 489 congregations.

The church announced the temple's location on February 26, 2024, a 15.11-acre parcel at the northwest corner where Southeast 20th Street meets Southeast Bybee Road in Camas. Initial designs indicated a multistory building of roughly 43,000 square feet. While the temple has Vancouver in its name, the property sits within the city boundaries of Camas. Property records show the church acquired the commercially-zoned land for $8.25 million in May 2023.

An architectural rendering of the temple's exterior was announced on September 3, 2024. During January 2025, several residents addressed the Camas city council expressing concerns about possible effects on bird migration routes along the Pacific Flyway. The city of Camas issued its environmental assessment on January 20, 2025, concluding the project would not harm the environment or local wildlife populations, including deer, songbirds, and waterfowl. City officials also confirmed no threatened or endangered species inhabit the site. An archaeological predetermination survey conducted in 2024 had found no evidence of pre-contact or historic-period archaeological deposits on the site. The site consists of Pleistocene glacial outburst sand and silt deposits.

Approval for preliminary construction activities came on March 10, 2025, when the church announced it had secured the necessary permits. The authorization covered land clearing, utility installation, and Southeast Bybee Road realignment. Area seventy Gordon L. Treadway stated the work's commencement represented a significant step forward in establishing the temple in the Vancouver vicinity. Initial site preparation and clearing operations got underway in April 2025.

On May 27, 2025, the church announced that groundbreaking ceremonies would take place on August 23, 2025. General Authority Seventy Mark A. Bragg, the president of the church's North America West Area, presided at the ceremony. His wife, Yvonne Bragg, a Vancouver native, joined in the ceremony. During his address, Bragg characterized temples as symbols of faith and hope, drawing an analogy to the 1980 Mount St. Helens volcanic eruption located roughly 40 miles northeast of the temple site. He described how prairie lupine plants pioneered growth in volcanic pumice deposits, subsequently enabling other plant species to establish themselves. The Vancouver ceremony occurred simultaneously with groundbreakings for temples in Tampa, Florida, and Brazzaville, Republic of the Congo—the fifth occasion in Church history when three temple groundbreakings happened on a single day.

== Design and architecture ==
The temple design is for a three-story brick building reaching approximately 267 feet at its highest point, including a 66-foot spire. The building will be roughly 43,000 square feet. Seattle-based JTM Construction has the construction contract, with work projected to require approximately three years.

The temple occupies a 15.11-acre site at the northwest corner where Southeast 20th Street intersects Southeast Bybee Road. Construction necessitated rerouting Southeast Bybee Road, which originally cut through the temple property. The road realignment work commenced in early August 2025 and was completed on October 9, 2025. A detention pond was constructed at the property's northern end to manage stormwater runoff. Plans call for landscaping incorporating gardens, trees, and water features throughout the grounds.

Brick forms the primary construction material. The architectural rendering displays an off-white exterior featuring tall rectangular windows with a prominent arched window at the building's front. A tower with rectangular window openings is above the main entrance. Lighting fixtures will be mounted along the building's edges, with shielding designed to prevent light from dispersing beyond the property boundaries.

The interior will include four instruction rooms, three sealing rooms, and a baptistry. Ordinances such as the initiatory, endowment, and sealings will be performed in the temple.

== Temple leadership and admittance ==
The church's temples are directed by a temple president and matron, each typically serving for a term of three years. The president and matron oversee the administration of temple operations and provide guidance and training for both temple patrons and staff. With construction continuing, no temple leadership appointments have been announced.

=== Admittance ===
Like all the church's temples, it is not used for Sunday worship services. To members of the church, temples are regarded as sacred houses of the Lord. Once dedicated, only church members with a current temple recommend can enter for worship.

== See also ==
- Comparison of temples (LDS Church)
- List of temples (LDS Church)
- List of temples by geographic region (LDS Church)
- Temple architecture (LDS Church)
- Architecture of the LDS Church
- The Church of Jesus Christ of Latter-day Saints in Washington
- The Church of Jesus Christ of Latter-day Saints in Oregon
