= Mark A. Bragg =

Mark Allyn Bragg is an American religious leader who has served as a general authority of the Church of Jesus Christ of Latter-day Saints (LDS Church) since 2016.

== Early life, education, and career ==
Bragg was born in Santa Monica, California on April 16, 1962, to Donald Edward Bragg and Helen Diane Sims. Bragg converted to the LDS Church when he was 14 after being introduced by friends on his Little League team.

Bragg graduated from the University of Utah with degrees in marketing and Spanish, and took courses at the University of California, Los Angeles and the University of Michigan. From 1988 to 1996, he served as a vice president at Great Western Bank. He was a senior vice president for Aames from 1996 to 2007 and Residential Credit Solutions from 2007 to 2012. He also worked as a senior vice president of complaint resolution and government relations at Bank of America.

== LDS Church service ==
Bragg served as a missionary in the Monterrey, Mexico area. Among other callings, he later served as a bishop, high councilor, temple ordinance worker, stake president, and area seventy. On April 2, 2016, he was called as a general authority. His assignments have included serving in the presidencies of the church's South America South and North America West areas.

Bragg visited areas is Hawaii affected by the 2023 Hawaii wildfires. He helped set up local meetinghouses as shelters and met with Lieutenant Governor Sylvia Luke. In response to the January 2025 Southern California wildfires, Bragg released the church's official response, highlighting the "light of Christ working through these organizations, families, friends, and even complete strangers" who responded to the wildfires.

On June 18, 2022, he presided over the groundbreaking of the Yorba Linda California Temple, and also presided at the groundbreaking of the Vancouver Washington Temple on August 23, 2025.

== Personal life ==
Bragg married Yvonne King, a daughter of his mission president, on March 17, 1984, in the Los Angeles California Temple. They have four children.

On January 29, 2001, the day after he was sustained as a bishop, Bragg's mother was killed in a kidnapping attempt at the South Bay Galleria Mall.
