= Seattle Washington Temple =

Temple of the Church of Jesus Christ of Latter-day Saints in Bellevue, Washington

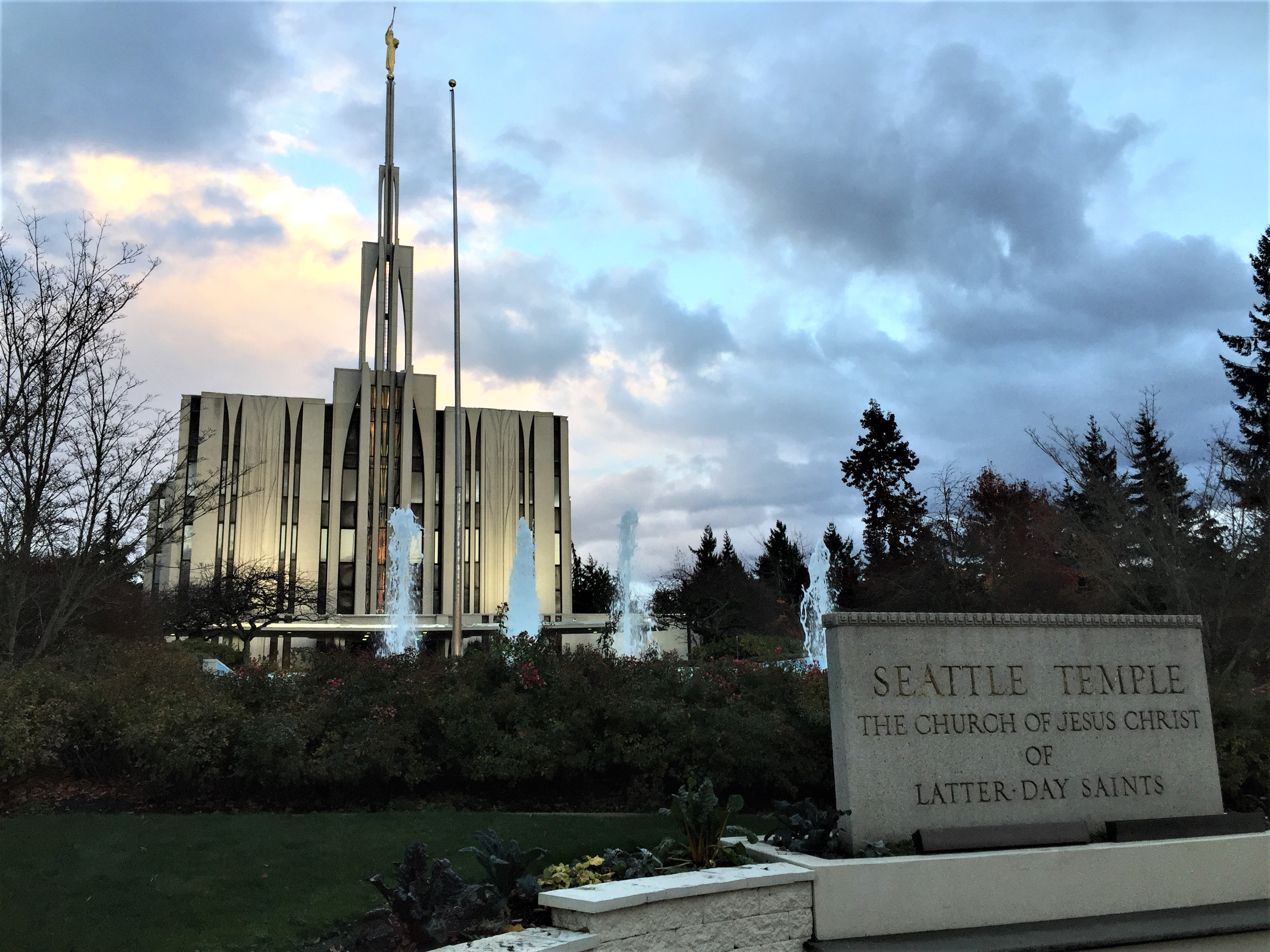
- Interactive map of Seattle Washington Temple
- Number: 19
- Dedication: November 17, 1980, by Spencer W. Kimball
- Site: 23.5 acres (9.5 ha)
- Floor area: 110,000 ft^{2} (10,000 m^{2})
- Height: 179 ft (55 m)
- Official website • News & images

Church chronology
← Tokyo Japan Temple	Seattle Washington Temple	→ Jordan River Utah Temple

Additional information
- Announced: November 15, 1975, by Spencer W. Kimball
- Groundbreaking: May 27, 1978, by Marion G. Romney
- Open house: October 7 – November 8, 1980
- Designed by: Emil B. Fetzer
- Location: Bellevue, Washington, United States
- Coordinates: 47°35′2.651999″N 122°8′27.15360″W
- Exterior finish: Reinforced concrete faced with white marble aggregate and cast stone
- Baptistries: 1
- Ordinance rooms: 4 (stationary)
- Sealing rooms: 13
- Clothing rental: Yes

The Seattle Washington Temple (formerly the Seattle Temple) is the 21st constructed and 19th operating temple of the Church of Jesus Christ of Latter-day Saints (LDS Church). Located in the city of Bellevue, east of Seattle, it was the first to be built in the state of Washington. The temple has a modern single-spire design. The intent to build the temple was announced on November 15, 1975.

Due to its proximity to the Bellevue Airfield, the proposed height of the spire was reduced, and a red strobe warning light was installed at the base of the angel Moroni statue. The airfield closed in 1983, and the light was shut off.

== History ==
The intent to construct the temple was announced on November 15, 1975, and it was dedicated five years later on November 17, 1980, by church president Spencer W. Kimball. The temple was built on 23.5 acres (9.5 ha), has four ordinance rooms and 12 sealing rooms, and a total floor area of 110,000 square feet (10,000 m^{2}).

A groundbreaking ceremony, marking the commencement of construction, took place on May 27, 1978, The ceremony was presided over by Marion G. Romney and attended by approximately 1,200 church members.

To support the temple's construction, church members from across the temple district, including Alaska, British Columbia, Washington, Oregon, and Idaho, raised funds. They donated over $3.2 million to aid in the building of the temple.

In 2020, like all the church's other temples, the Seattle Washington Temple was closed for a time in response to the coronavirus pandemic.

== Design and architecture ==
The building has a modern design style, coupled with a traditional Latter-day Saint temple design. The architectural work was designed by Emil B. Fetzer. The temple's architecture reflects both the cultural heritage of the Seattle region and the spiritual significance to the church.

=== Site ===
The temple sits on an 18.5-acre plot, and the landscaping around the temple features a recreation of Dennis Smith’s statue “In the Family Circle.” These elements are designed to provide a tranquil setting to enhance the sacred atmosphere of the site.

=== Exterior ===
The structure stands five stories tall, constructed with reinforced concrete faced with white aggregate and cast stone. The exterior is characterized by a single spire topped with a statue of the angel Moroni, each chosen for their symbolic significance and alignment with temple traditions. The design incorporates elements that are reflective of both the local culture and the broader church symbolism.

=== Interior ===
The interior features Czechoslovak chandeliers throughout the temple. Additionally, the temple’s “window and wall designs frequently incorporate reverse Gothic arches with lines that bend out like tree branches.” The focal point of the temple is the celestial room, which is designed to foster a spiritually uplifting environment. One journalist who visited during the open house described the celestial room as being “the most beautiful of all the areas…Carpeted in the palest gold, beautifully furnished and lighted by the most magnificent chandelier known to man, this place must be as close to heaven as any place on Earth.”

=== Symbols ===
The design uses elements representing Latter-day Saint symbols, which provide deeper spiritual meaning to the temple's appearance and function. Symbolism is an important subject to church members. One example in the temple is the carpets, which begin as a dark brown color and slowly become lighter as one travels upward through the temple, until they are eventually a white color. This represents the spiritual journey of faithful church members. Another example of symbolism in the temple is the tree branch-like wall designs, which were intended as an homage to the Northwestern region of the United States where the temple is located.

=== Cultural and community impact ===
The temple plays a role in both educating and spiritually uplifting the community of church members in Washington. The Seattle Family Discovery Center, which is located in a meetinghouse west of the temple grounds, acts as a comprehensive educational resource, providing both members and non-members with an in-depth understanding of the importance of family history and genealogical research.

=== Temple presidents ===
The church's temples are directed by a temple president and matron, each generally serving for a term of three years. The president and matron oversee the administration of temple operations and provide guidance and training for both temple patrons and staff.

The first president of the Seattle Washington Temple was F. Arthur Kay, with the matron being Eunice N. Kay. They served from 1980 to 1984. As of 2024, Frank L. Pitcher is the president, with Sandra S. Pitcher serving as matron.

=== Admittance ===
Following the completion of the temple, the church announced that a public open house would be held from October 7-November 8, 1980. (excluding Sundays). The temple was dedicated by Spencer W. Kimball in 13 sessions from November 17-21, 1980. Like all temples of the church, it is not used for Sunday worship services. To members of the church, temples are regarded as sacred houses of the Lord. Once dedicated, only church members with a current temple recommend can enter for worship.

== See also ==
Temples in and near Washington
- = Operating
- = Under construction
- = Announced
- = Temporarily Closed

- The Church of Jesus Christ of Latter-day Saints in Washington
- Royden G. Derrick, a former temple president
- Comparison of temples of The Church of Jesus Christ of Latter-day Saints
- List of temples of The Church of Jesus Christ of Latter-day Saints
- List of temples of The Church of Jesus Christ of Latter-day Saints by geographic region
- Temple architecture (Latter-day Saints)
