= Spokane Washington Temple =

Temple of the LDS Church

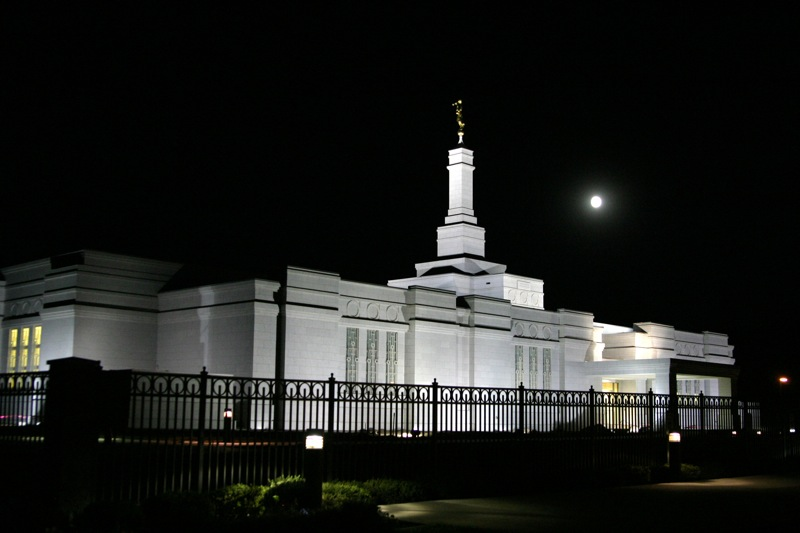
- Interactive map of Spokane Washington Temple
- Number: 59
- Dedication: August 21, 1999, by Gordon B. Hinckley
- Site: 2 acres (0.81 ha)
- Floor area: 10,700 ft^{2} (990 m^{2})
- Height: 71 ft (22 m)
- Official website • News & images

Church chronology
| ← Guayaquil Ecuador Temple | Spokane Washington Temple | → Columbus Ohio Temple |

Additional information
- Announced: August 13, 1998, by Gordon B. Hinckley
- Groundbreaking: October 10, 1998, by F. Melvin Hammond
- Open house: August 6–14, 1999
- Location: Spokane Valley, Washington, United States
- Coordinates: 47°37′12.58679″N 117°13′14.48400″W
- Exterior finish: Granite
- Design: Classic modern, single-spire design
- Baptistries: 1
- Ordinance rooms: 2 (two-stage progressive)
- Sealing rooms: 2

The Spokane Washington Temple is the 59th operating temple of the Church of Jesus Christ of Latter-day Saints and is located in Spokane County, Washington. Announced on August 13, 1998 by the church's First Presidency, it became the second temple in Washington state. At the time of its construction, it served about 50,000 church members in eastern Washington, northern Idaho, and western Montana.

It has a single spire with a statue of the angel Moroni at its top and followed the standardized smaller temple design introduced by the church in the late 1990s. A groundbreaking ceremony was held on October 10, 1998, with F. Melvin Hammond of the Seventy, presiding. Constructed on a 2-acre site, the building includes a granite exterior and landscaped grounds. The structure is 10,700 square feet and has two ordinance rooms, two sealing rooms, and a baptistry. During a public open house held from August 6 to August 14, 1999, approximately 52,000 visitors toured the temple. The temple was dedicated by church president Gordon B. Hinckley from August 21–23, 1999, in 11 sessions attended by more than 16,000 church members. In March 2009, a new angel Moroni statue was installed on the temple’s spire, replacing the original and aligning it to face west to match the temple’s orientation.

== History ==
The Spokane Washington Temple was announced by the First Presidency on August 13, 1998. On October 10, 1998, the church announced that the temple would be constructed on a 4.2-acre property located at 13710 East 40th Avenue in Spokane, Washington. Preliminary plans called for a one-story structure of approximately 10,700 square feet. A groundbreaking ceremony took place on October 10, 1998, marking the commencement of construction. This ceremony was presided over by F. Melvin Hammond, a general authority, and was attended by local church members and community leaders. Its groundbreaking occurred on the same day as the one for the Detroit Michigan Temple, marking the first time that groundbreaking ceremonies were held on the same day for two temples.

Following the completion of the temple, a public open house was take place from August 6 to August 14, 1999. During the open house, approximately 51,950 people visited the temple, including government, civic, and religious leaders who attended VIP tours on August 5. Spokane Mayor John Talbott remarked, “You could almost sense the spiritual component of the progression [through the temple]”.

The temple was dedicated on August 21, 1999, by Hinckley, with 11 dedicatory sessions across three days, and attended by more than 16,000 church members. In March 2009, a new angel Moroni statue was placed on the spire. Unlike the original, which faced east, the new statue was positioned facing west—the same orientation as the temple itself.

In 2020, along with all the church's others, the Spokane Washington Temple was closed for a time in response to the COVID-19 pandemic.

== Design and architecture ==
The building uses a modern interpretation of traditional Latter-day Saint temple design, emphasizing simplicity and reverence in its architectural expression. The temple was designed by the church's architectural department. It is on a 4.2-acre plot in the suburb of Opportunity, Spokane, Washington. The site was previously used as a softball field on church recreational property before being repurposed for the temple. The landscaping includes lawns and native trees.

The temple is one-story, measuring 144 feet by 77 feet, with a total floor area of 10,700 square feet. The exterior of the building has a granite finish.

The temple interior includes a baptistry, two ordinance rooms, and two sealing rooms. Like most church temples, the baptismal font is placed upon twelve oxen, representing the Twelve Tribes of Israel.

== Temple presidents ==
The church's temples are directed by a temple president and matron, each typically serving for a term of three years. The president and matron oversee the administration of temple operations and provide guidance and training for both temple patrons and staff. Serving from 1999 to 2004, Frank E. Wagstaff the first president, with Jane D. Wagstaff serving as matron. As of 2025, Orson N. Daines is the president, with Donna M. Daines serving as matron.

== Admittance ==
On July 10, 1999, the church announced the public open house that was held from August 6 to August 14, 1999 (excluding Sunday). The temple was dedicated by Gordon B. Hinckley from August 21 to August 23, 1999, in 11 sessions.

Like all the church's temples, it is not used for Sunday worship services. To members of the church, temples are regarded as sacred houses of the Lord. Once dedicated, only church members with a current temple recommend can enter for worship.

== See also ==
- The Church of Jesus Christ of Latter-day Saints in Washington
- Comparison of temples of The Church of Jesus Christ of Latter-day Saints
- List of temples of The Church of Jesus Christ of Latter-day Saints
- List of temples of The Church of Jesus Christ of Latter-day Saints by geographic region
- Temple architecture (Latter-day Saints)

== Additional reading ==
- "Weather clears as 1,000 watch groundbreaking in Spokane", Church News, October 24, 1998
- "11,000 attend first two days of temple open house", Church News, August 14, 1999
- Dockstader, Julie (August 28, 1999), "'Wonderful way' to make temple blessings possible", Church News
- Dockstader, Julie (August 28, 1999), "Cover Story: Amid rays of sunshine, 59th temple dedicated", Church News
