= Bellevue Airfield =

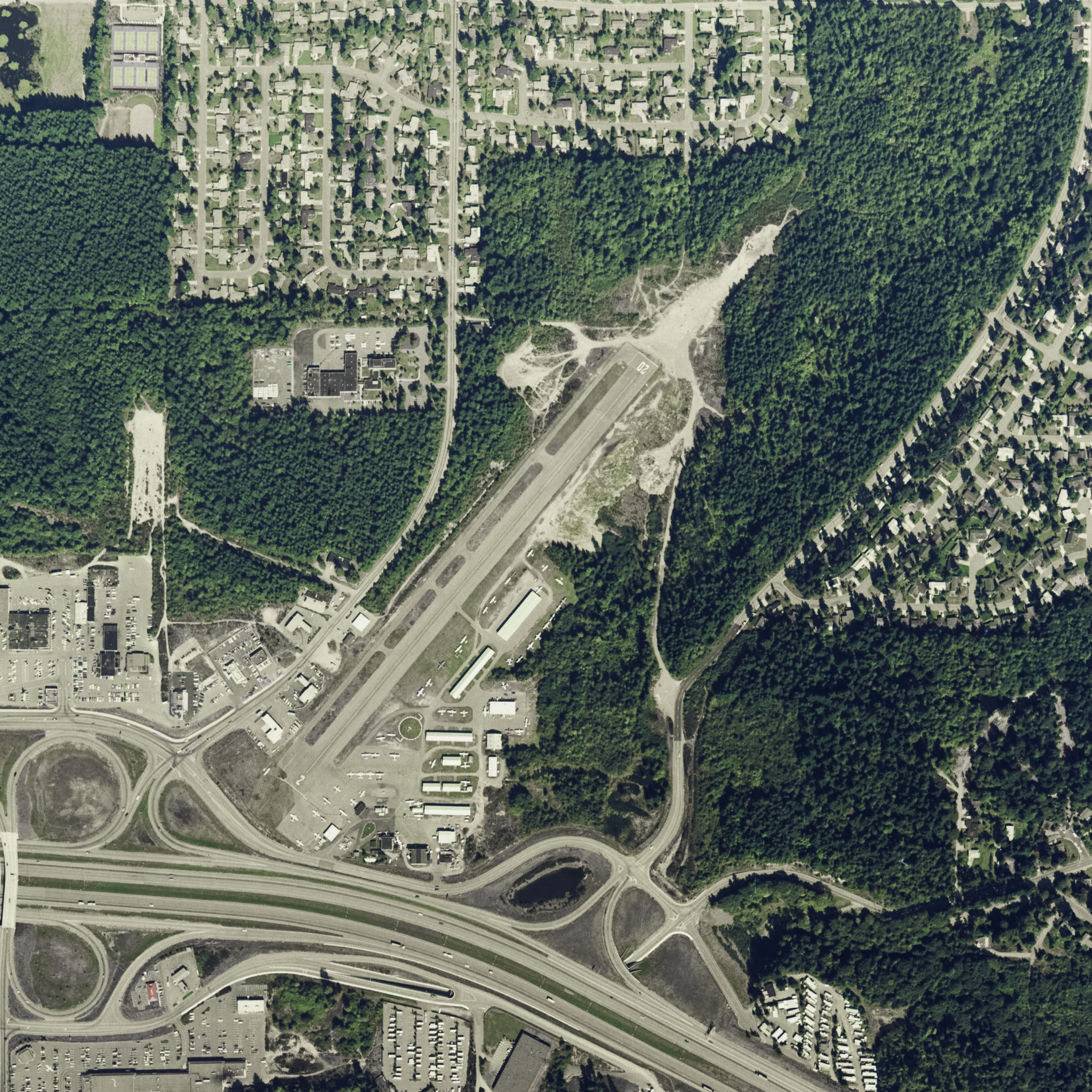
- Bellevue Airfield in 1977
- IATA: none; ICAO: none

Summary
- Location: Bellevue, Washington, U.S.
- Opened: c. 1945
- Closed: 1983; 43 years ago
- Time zone: Pacific (UTC−8)
  - Summer (DST): (UTC−7)
- Elevation AMSL: 345 ft (105 m)
- Coordinates: 47.583°N 122.131°W

Map
- Location within Washington (state) Location within the United States

Runways
Direction	Length		Surface
Direction	ft	m	Surface
2/20	2,300	701	Asphalt

Bellevue Airfield (BVU) was a private airfield in Bellevue, Washington, United States. It was situated east of 156th Avenue SE and north of Interstate 90 near Phantom Lake in the Eastgate neighborhood. The 2,300-foot (700 m) asphalt runway's elevation was at 345 feet (105 m) above sea level, and ran southwest to northeast (marked 2/20). Part of the airport's land was used as a landfill from 1951 till 1964, and featured a landfill gas venting system. Closed in 1983, today the area is an office park.

When the LDS Seattle Washington Temple opened in 1980, the airfield was still in operation and the temple spire included a strobe light.

Sometime after the airport closed, a new heliport was added at the north end of runway named Bellevue Business Park Boeing Company Services Headquarters Heliport with the designation of 71WA. It was reportedly used as a private heliport for the nearby Boeing Eastgate campus. The heliport was closed and the final visible remnants of the north end of the old runway were removed during construction of the Advanta Office Commons buildings leased by Microsoft. The disused heliport is still visible and is occasionally used as a basketball court.

The remaining 27 acres north of the Advanta Office Commons was sold to City of Bellevue from Boeing who plans on developing it into Bellevue Airfield Park. However, design and construction is expected to take some time as renovation of the landfill gas system is required. Boeing sold the remainder of its Eastgate Office Park in 2021 and is expected to leave the campus entirely by 2023.

The only remnants still visible is the heliport and the red and white lamp posts with two red strobe lights on top situated on the nearby overpasses to the south.
