= Phantom Lake =

Lake in Bellevue, Washington, USA

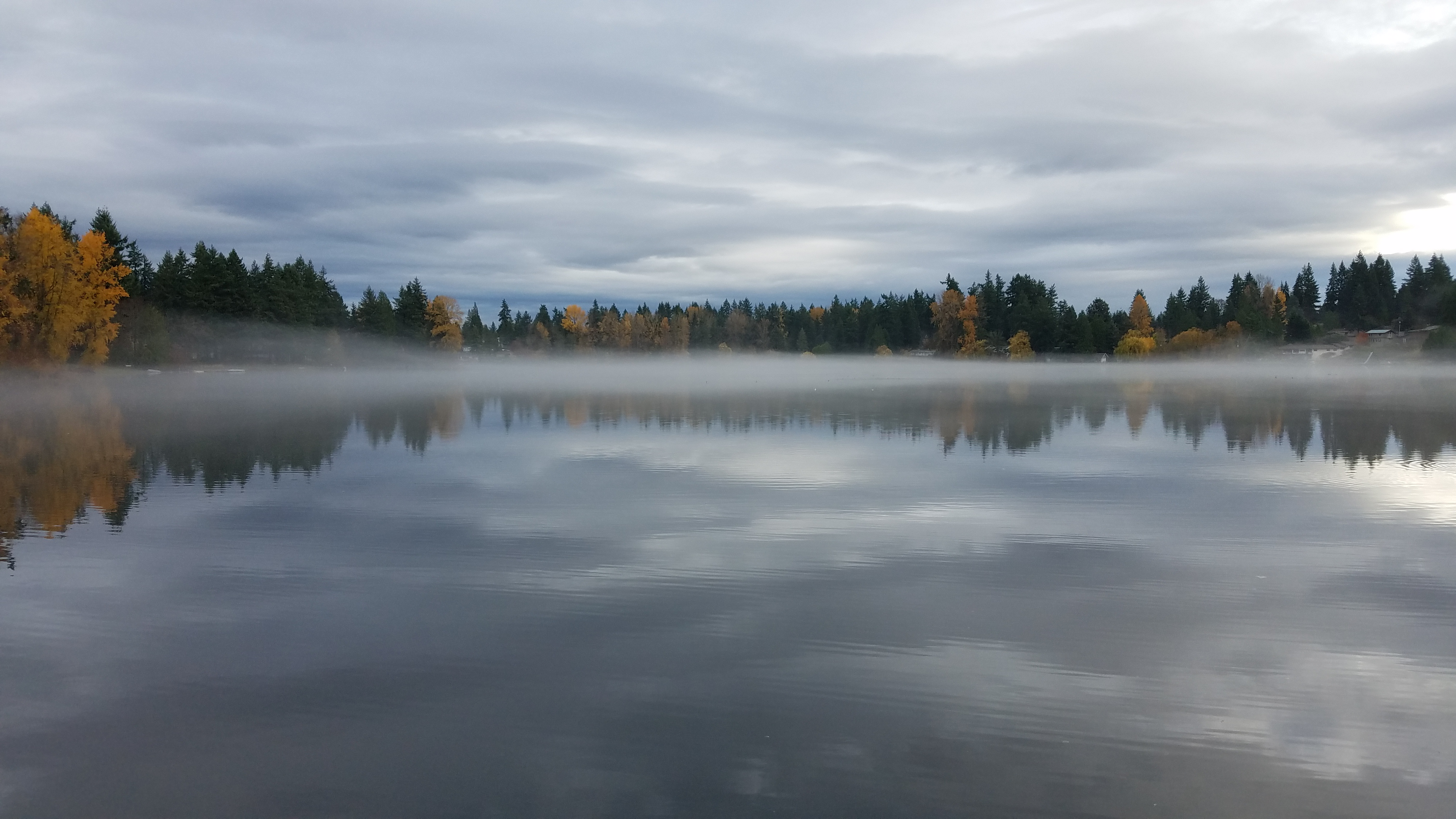
- View east from Phantom Lake Park in 2017

- Location within Washington (state) Location within the United States
- Location: Bellevue, Washington
- Coordinates: 47°35′36″N 122°07′30″W
- Basin countries: United States
- Surface area: 63 acres (25 ha)
- Max. depth: 45 ft (14 m)
- Shore length^{1}: 2.6 miles (4.2 km)
- Surface elevation: 250 ft (76 m)
- ^{1} Shore length is not a well-defined measure.

Phantom Lake is a small lake inside the city limits of Bellevue, Washington, east of Seattle. A 2.6-mile (4.2 km) pedestrian trail circles the lake, and according to the city government, Bellevue's oldest and largest trees are there. Located about a mile (1.6 km) north of Interstate 90 and west of nearby Lake Sammamish, its surface elevation is approximately 250 feet (76 m) above sea level.

Historically, Phantom Lake once drained to the north through Larsen Lake and the Kelsey Creek basin. Nineteenth-century farmer Henry Thode redirected the Phantom Lake outlet to Lake Sammamish, creating Weowna Creek in the process. Today, Phantom Lake has a surface area of 63 acres (0.25 km^{2}) and a maximum depth of 45 feet (14 m).

Bellevue Airfield, closed in 1983, was nearby to the southwest; the approach to runway 20 was along the lake's southeastern shore.
