= Larsen Lake =

Lake in Bellevue, Washington

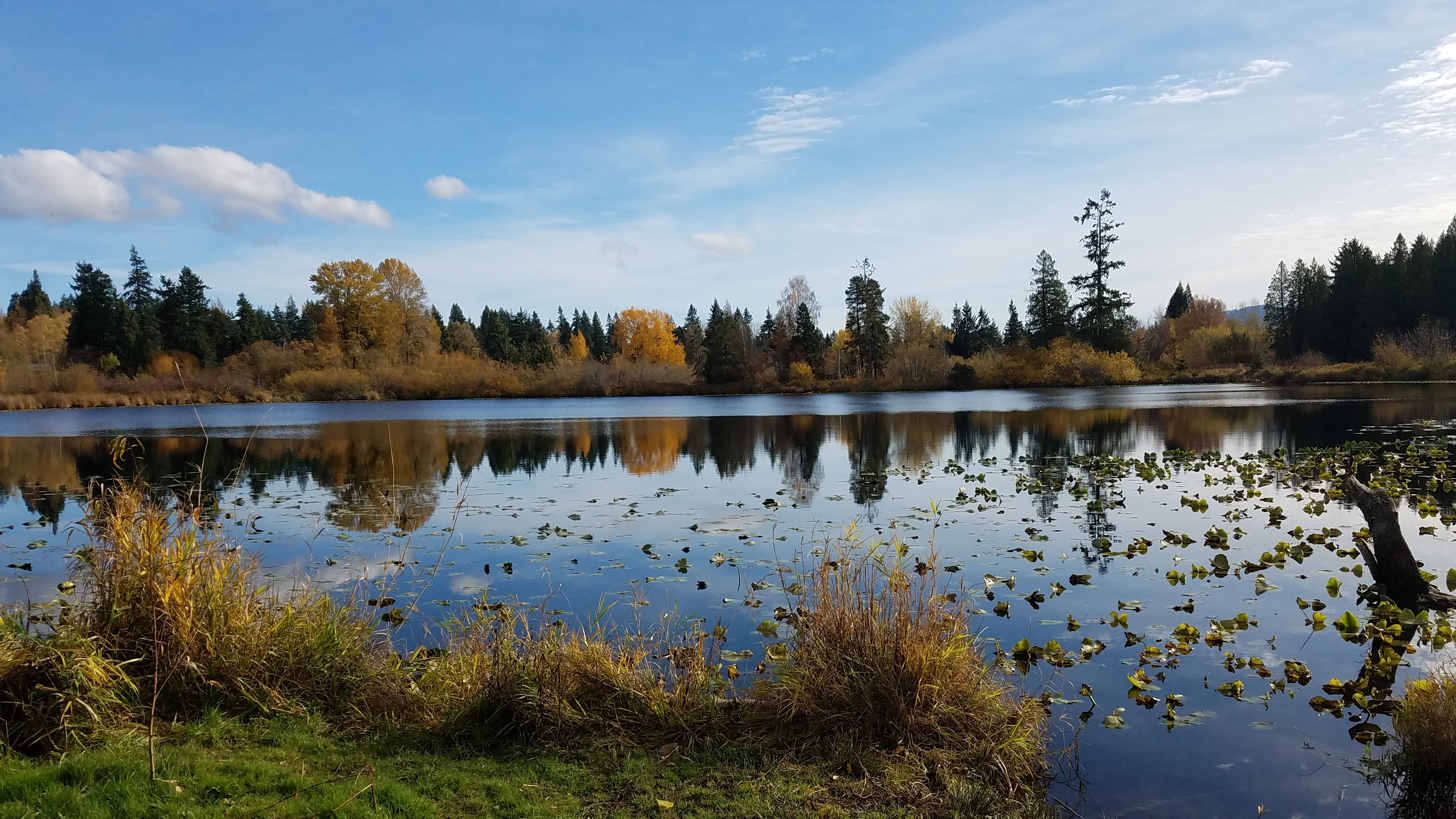
- Larsen Lake and surroundings

- Location within Washington (state) Location within the United States
- Location: Bellevue, Washington
- Coordinates: 47.605062°N 122.140302°W
- Basin countries: United States
- Surface area: 9.80 acres (3.97 ha)
- Surface elevation: 253 ft (77 m)

Larsen Lake, also known as Blueberry Lake, is a small lake inside the city limits of Bellevue, Washington, east of Seattle. A blueberry farm surrounds the lake. Larsen Lake is the headwaters of Kelsey Creek.

== History ==
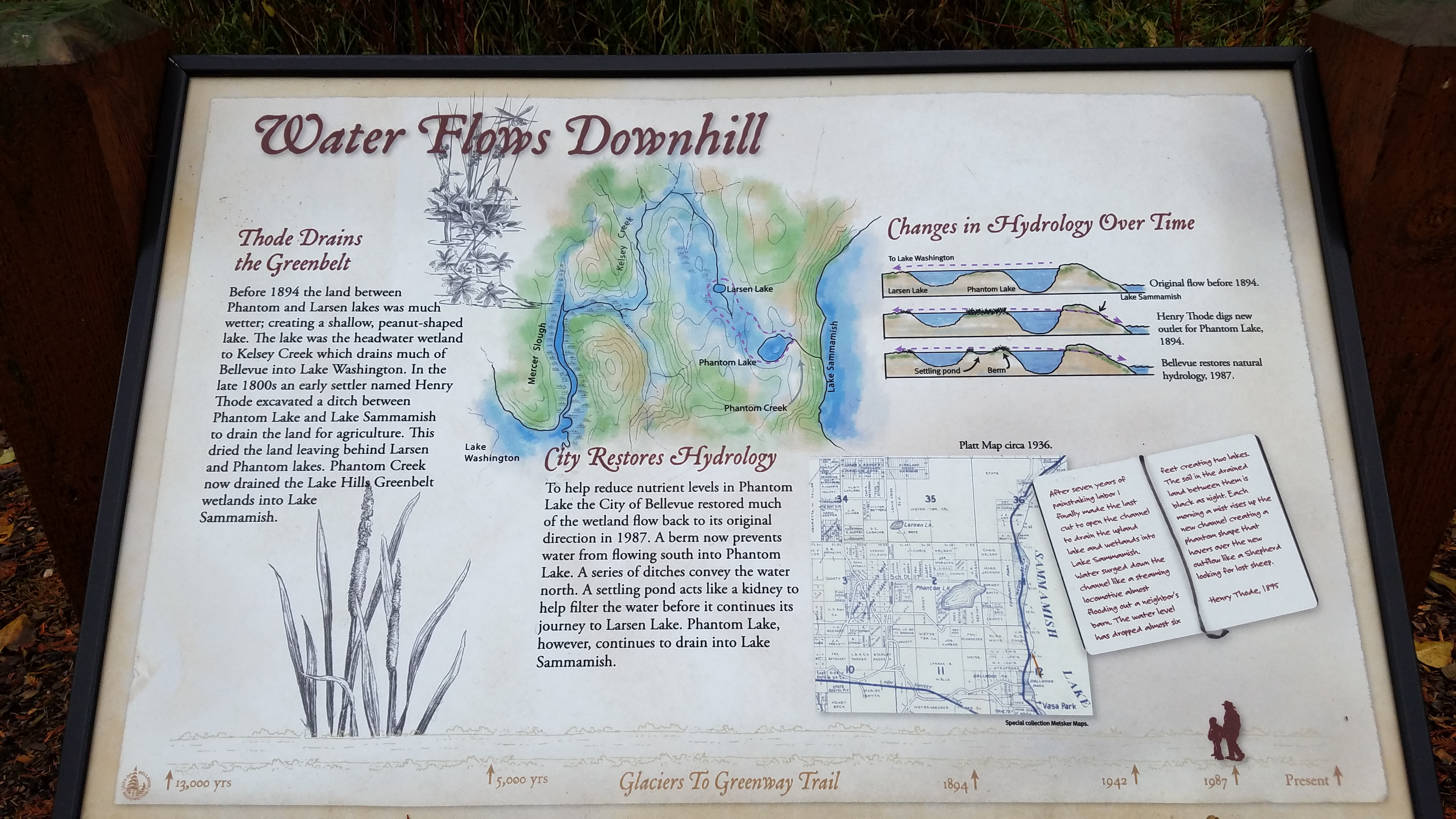
History of the drainage of Larsen Lake, Phantom Lake, and Kelsey Creek

Historically, Phantom Lake drained into Larsen Lake through the marshy, low-lying region between them. This watershed then drained into Kelsey Creek and Lake Washington. In the 1880s, settlers redirected the outflow of Phantom Lake into nearby Lake Sammamish through what is now Weowna Creek. This drained the area for agriculture. In 1987, some water was allowed to flow back through the original wetland to restore the habitat.

The lake is named for Ove Peter and Mary Larsen, immigrants from Denmark who homesteaded the surrounding land in 1889. In 1913, the Aries brothers purchased the land from the Larsens and established a farm. The blueberry farm was created by Louis Weinzirl in 1944.

== Description ==
Larsen Lake is located in the Lake Hills neighborhood of Bellevue, and is connected to nearby Phantom Lake by the Lake Hills Greenbelt, a trail and wetland. The lake is popular for fishing, and there is a public fishing dock. Much of stormwater runoff from the area drains into Larsen Lake and Kelsey Creek.

The farm at Larsen Lake is popular with residents and tourists, and includes U-pick blueberries. In 1995, the blueberry farm suffered from a devastating fungal outbreak. The use of fungicide to stop the outbreak led to controversy since the farm lost its organic status.

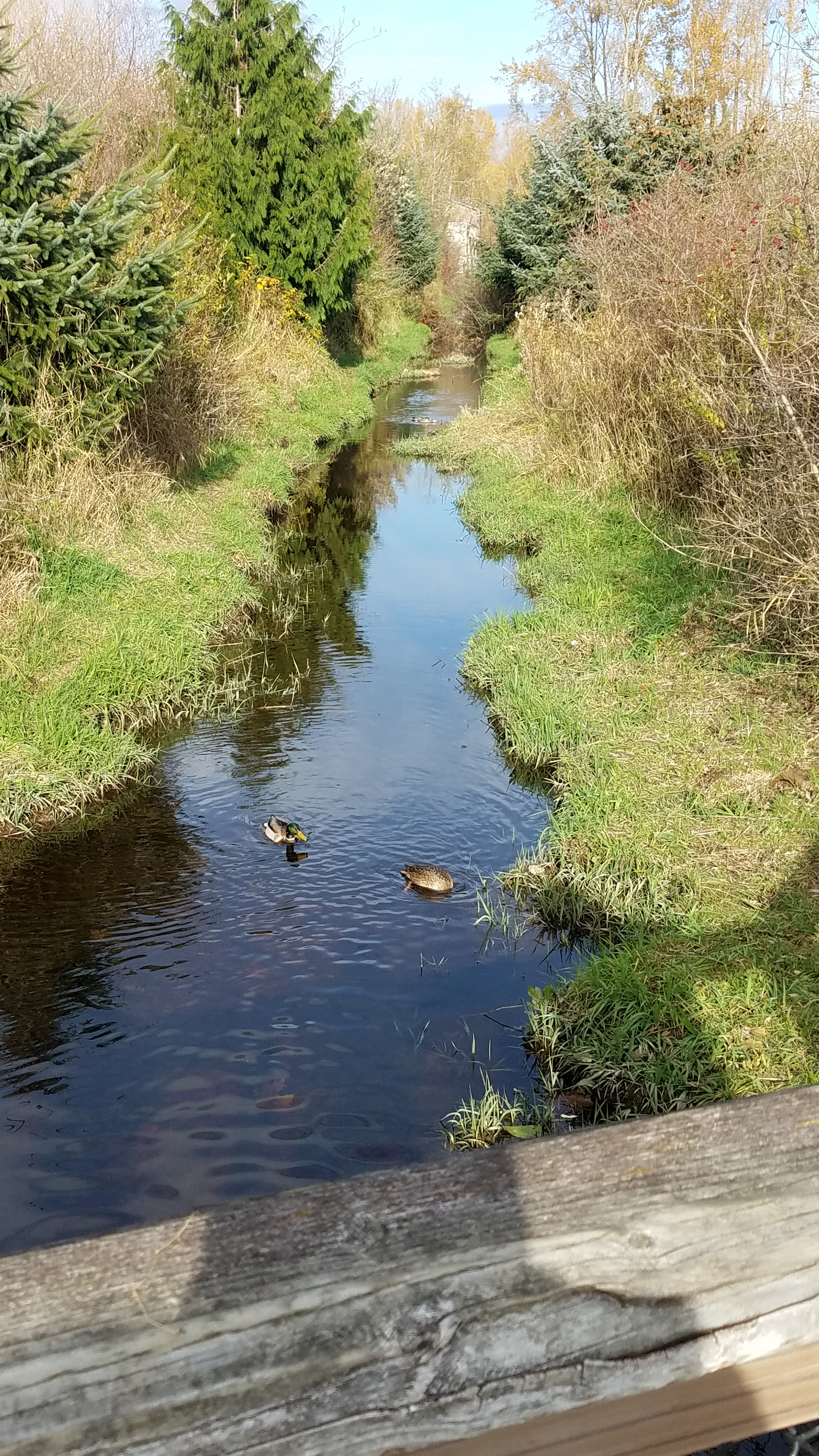
The beginning of Kelsey Creek, at the north end of the lake

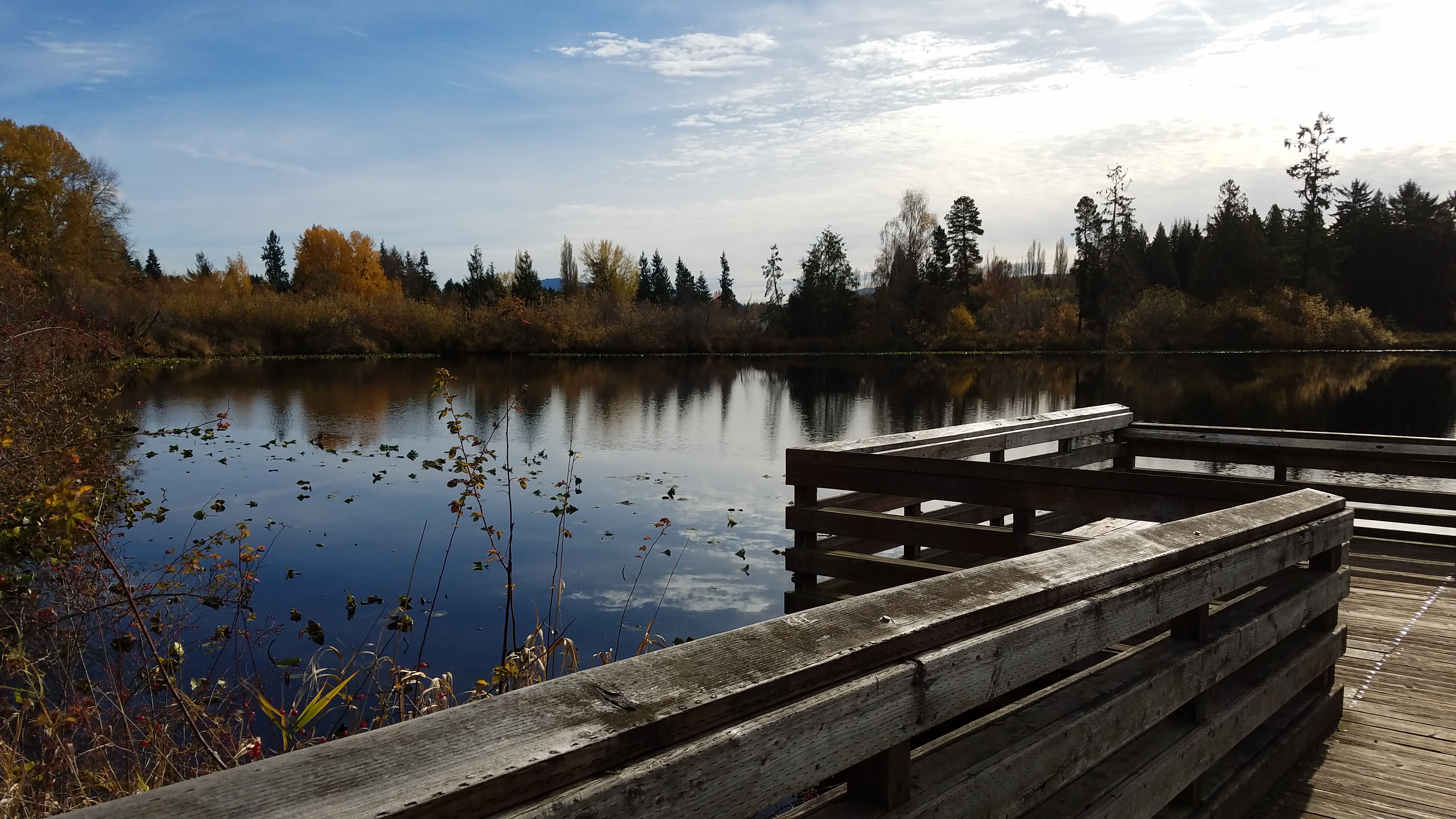
The fishing dock
