= Jami Porter Lara =

American artist

Jami Porter Lara (born 1969 in Spokane, Washington) is an artist living in Albuquerque, New Mexico, known primarily for her black vessel-like conceptual sculptures created using millennia-old ceramics techniques indigenous to the Chihuahuan Desert. Porter Lara's work is in public and private collections nationwide, and has been featured in Art 21 Magazine, CFile, Hyperallergic, and on PBS. In 2017, Artsy named her one of the artists shaping the future of ceramics. She is represented by form & concept in Santa Fe, and Simon Breitbard Fine Arts in San Francisco.

== Education ==
Porter Lara moved to Albuquerque, New Mexico as a young child in 1980, and later attended the University of New Mexico, where she earned a Bachelor of Fine Arts in 2013. Porter Lara also learned pottery techniques from Graciela and Hector Gallegos in the village of Mata Ortiz in the northern state of Chihuahua, Mexico. In the 1970s, a Pueblo pottery revival took place in Mata Ortiz. People there started making ceramic pots that bore stylistic relation to ancient pot sherds and artifacts found in that vicinity, from the Casas Grandes and Mimbres cultures. They locally sourced their materials and discovered how to make ceramic vessels using 2,000 year old techniques. Porter Lara says “they showed us how to soak the clay and filter it and then let it dry. They also taught us how to build out of coils and how to burnish with a stone.” In this way the forms and meaning of Porter Lara’s art are distinctly contemporary, but her materials and techniques connect her work to the Southwest and to people who preceded her in the region.

== Work ==
=== Ceramics ===
Porter Lara uses techniques based on those that Mata Ortiz potters have used to create vessels in the region over 2,000 years ago. She harvests raw clay from the earth, then processes it, by slaking, filtering, and drying it to a workable state. She builds the vessels with clay coils, burnishes the pieces with a polishing stone, then uses the reduction firing process in a backyard pit, covered with a galvanized aluminum tub. During the reduction process, the pottery is kept away from flames and oxygen. Carbon released by sawdust and newspaper surrounding the work bonds with the clay and turns the vessels black.

Her inspiration for the black burnished vessels appeared on a trip with the Land Arts of the American West program to southeastern Arizona and northern Mexico. The group spent a week camping in the high desert grasslands of Coronado National Forest. There she recognized many discarded articles of immigrants who had crossed the border, including 2-liter plastic bottles, sometimes in burlap slings. In the same places she found water bottles, it is also possible to find potsherds and other artifacts left by people thousands of years before. When Porter Lara returned to New Mexico, she kept on reflecting on the idea of how the plastic bottle and the potsherd are essentially the same thing. Both constitute precious objects, vessels, with the ability of sustaining life. She "began to think about them as evidence of an ancient and unbroken flow -- of people, culture, plants and animals-- that continues in spite of attempts to sever it." Her work reflects on the necessity of water for human life and a concept that Porter Lara calls "reverse archeology." The reverse archaeological process refers to her digging into issues of the present and the future by applying tools of the past.

Porter Lara's work also engages with the industrialized mass production that characterizes modern consumer culture, while recognizing the harmful impact of this on society, she also states "Saying that humans are only pollutants is a failure of imagination. Yes, we’re destructive, but we’re also creative. . . . I want to create the possibility that we can see things differently and contribute to the world. My work is my refusal to say that the earth would be better without me, and the determination to become equal to that claim.

=== Conceptual art ===
==== Witness Whiteness, 2017 ====
In response to the 2016 Presidential election of Donald Trump, Porter Lara developed a new body of work about whiteness. She says "In a time when the baroque racism of Trump and his supporters had made it easier than ever for progressives whites to claim racial innocence, it felt urgently important to interrogate whiteness not as something that described them -- the stereotyped white working-class Trump voter -- but as something that described me." The artist made a big white neon sign that flashes between W_IT_NESS and WHITENESS. For Porter Lara the sign is as literal as it seems, she wanted a giant flashing neon sign prompting her to see it - see it - see it. But whiteness is plainly manifest to all who don’t inhabit it. For people of color, the structures of whiteness are as evident as a giant flashing neon sign.

==== She's a Good Person, 2018 ====
In 2018, Porter Lara redesigned a vintage flour sack label, replacing “All-Purpose White Flour” with “All-Purpose White Fear”, which she printed onto muslin, and sewed into a set of girls dresses. The artist wanted the work to address mothering and home as spaces supposedly innocent of ideology, but where white mothers and grandmothers are engaged in the very political work of transmitting the values of white dominance to children. Porter Lara is interested "in how white mothers who are portrayed as innocent, defenseless, and incapable of violence - perform the critical foundational work of perpetuating racism, sexism, and homophobia through the education and policing of children." This work was greatly informed by Elizabeth Gillespie McRae's Mothers of Massive Resistance. The book shows that American white supremacy is a system that was co-created by the work of white women, who, using the constructed political identity of “mother”, expanded the domestic sphere far beyond the home into schools, policy, and politics. Years before the Civil Rights Act of 1964, segregationist women were developing and using color-blind rhetoric, constructing a new conservative political language that disguised white supremacist values in the language of property rights, states' rights, parental rights, and constitutional intent.

== Selected exhibitions ==
Porter Lara's work was exhibited at the New Mexico Museum of Art in Santa Fe, New Mexico, as part of Alcoves 16/17. Peters Projects, a Santa Fe, NMgallery, presented a solo exhibition, In Situ, in 2017. She was represented by Peter Projects.

Porter Lara also had a solo exhibition in 2017 at the National Museum of Women in the Arts called Border Crossing. Twenty-five pieces of Porter Lara's work were featured in the show with much of the work inspired by the plastic bottles and ancient pottery remnants (shards). The show explores questions about what classifies relics as well as the human tendency to catalog and classify. Some of her vessels look like the disposable plastic bottles they reference. Other resemble classical urns, Pueblo pottery, or modernist sculpture. Some evoke organic associations, such as gourds, organs and birds. Each of the work's titles includes a series of numbers and letters that further identifies where Porter Lara sourced the clay and when she fired each piece.

In 2019, Porter Lara was commissioned by the U.S. State Department Art in Embassies Program to create an installation of her sculptures for the Matamoros Consulate.
