= Spencer MacCallum =

American anthropologist (1931–2020)

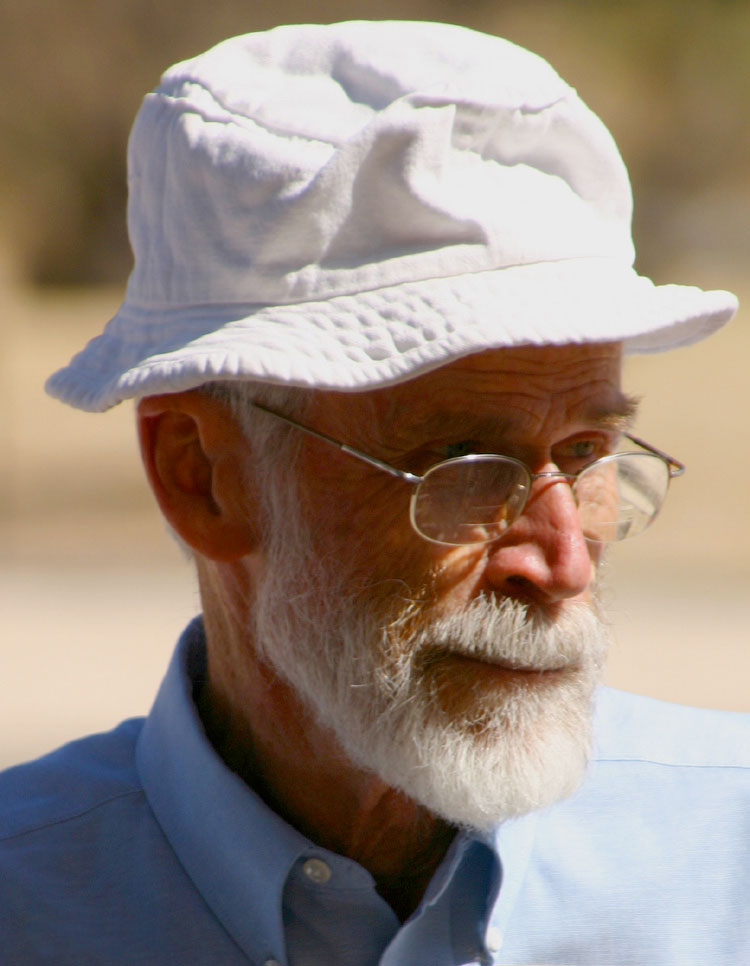
- MacCallum at the Amerind Foundation in Dragoon, Arizona, April 8, 2006, lecturing on the origins of Mata Ortiz pottery.
- Born: December 21, 1931; United States
- Died: December 17, 2020 (aged 88); Casas Grandes, Mexico
- Education: Princeton University; University of Washington
- Known for: Work on Mata Ortiz pottery
- Scientific career
- Fields: Anthropology

Spencer Heath McCallum (December 21, 1931 – December 17, 2020), commonly known as Spencer MacCallum, was an American anthropologist, business consultant and author. He was especially noted for his discovery of the pottery of the town of Mata Ortiz, Chihuahua, Mexico.

== Personal life ==
MacCallum graduated from Princeton University with a Bachelors in art history and received a Masters of Arts in social anthropology from the University of Washington. He specialized in studying the life, culture and stateless society of Northwest Coast Indians.

MacCallum was the grandson of Spencer Heath, inventor and dissenter from mainstream Georgism.

== Career ==
In 1956, MacCallum and his grandfather founded the Science of Society Foundation, which published a number of works, including Heath's book Citadel, Market and Altar. MacCallum was for many years an active researcher and lecturer for academic and business clients. He was a Research Fellow at the Independent Institute.

MacCallum shared his grandfather's interest in multi-tenant properties where developers lease properties and are responsible for providing community services, thereby replacing the functions traditionally provided by the state. He details these ideas in his 1970 booklet The Art of Community, as well as his 2003 articles "The Enterprise of Community: Market Competition, Land, and Environment" and "Looking Back and Forward" (which describes the influence of his grandfather); and his 2005 article on stateless social organization "From Upstate New York to the Horn of Africa."

In 1971, Werner Stiefel of Stiefel Laboratories commissioned MacCallum to write a master lease form for Operation Atlantis, a project designed to create a new voluntary nation in international waters. Stiefel's vision aligned with the ideas introduced by Spencer Heath, so MacCallum was the ideal person to help him develop the "constitution" for the new form of governance.

Although Operation Atlantis was defeated by disasters both natural and man-made, the lease form took on a life of its own as the master lease for "Orbis," an imaginary settlement in outer space. This fiction was due to Stiefel's concern about calling attention to his plan for a new form of governance on the ocean.

In 2005, MacCallum also edited and published The Law of the Somalis by Michael van Notten. The book deals with the foundations of the Somali customary law (Xeer).

Through his grandfather, MacCallum met alternative currency theorist E. C. Riegel. After Riegel's death, MacCallum obtained all Riegel's papers, which now reside with the Heather Foundation, of which MacCallum was the director. During the 1970s, MacCallum re-published Riegel's books The New Approach to Freedom and Private Enterprise Money and collected his papers into a new book called Flight from Inflation: The Monetary Alternative.

In 1976, MacCallum discovered artisan Juan Quezada, who soon became the leader of the now-thriving pottery movement located in Mata Ortiz, a small town near the ancient Paquime (or Casas Grandes) ruins in the Mexican state of Chihuahua. McCallum was the author of many articles on Mata Ortiz and an introduction to the book, Portraits of Clay: Potters of Mata Ortiz. His efforts helped the pottery win acceptance as a contemporary art form and a legitimate folk art.

MacCallum lived in nearby Casas Grandes and played a key role in Mata Ortiz affairs. Additionally, MacCallum had assisted archaeological investigations in the region by providing a compound to serve as quarters and lab space. He also hosted writers and artists at his properties in Casas Grandes.

== Proprietary communities ==
MacCallum developed the idea of proprietary communities. In The Art of Community, MacCallum defines community as follows:

"A community is an occupation by two or more persons of a place divided into private and common areas according to a system of relations which defines and allocates responsibility for the performance of all activities that might be required for its continuity." (p. 3)
"A proprietary community is a community administered as a proprietary enterprise in which the relations of every member of the community are formed directly with the proprietary authority." (p. 5)

Proprietary communities are thus distinguished from other types of community such as private communities, voluntary communities, and intentional communities by the fact that none of these latter types of community are necessarily organized on a proprietary basis. For example, residential communes, Amish communities, and Israeli kibbutzim are voluntary, but not proprietary. Importantly, proprietary communities are also distinguished from private communities such as home owners' associations, which operate on political principles (democratic voting by the multiple owners), not on proprietary principles (which require a single owner who leases units to multiple tenants). Examples of proprietary communities include hotels, marinas, office buildings, industrial parks, entertainment complexes, and ever-larger and more complex combinations of these.

In The Art of Community MacCallum argues that the property relations in a community fundamentally determine the physical structure and dynamics of the community. He writes that proprietary leasehold communities provide an optimal incentive system for communities by internalizing externalities and solving many of the coordination and cooperation problems that plague contemporary societies.

== Selected bibliography ==
- MacCallum, Spencer H. (January 2008). "E. C. RIEGEL ON MONEY / About E.C. Reigel / MacCallumOnRiegelJanuary2008.doc / AboutRiegel.pdf" (PDF). newapproachtofreedom.info. Academia.edu 3499094. Archived (PDF) from the original on September 17, 2024.
- Spencer H. Macallum: "Suburban Democracy vs. Residential Community". Critical Review, Vol 17, Nos. 3–4, 2006.
  - Possible match: MacCallum, Spencer H. (Summer 2005). "Residential politics: How democracy erodes community". Critical Review. 17 (3–4): 393–425. doi:10.1080/08913810508443646. eISSN 1933-8007. ISSN 0891-3811. ProQuest 217272390.
- MacCallum, Spencer (May 2005). "(Utopia Watch): (Searching for Utopia) From Upstate New York to the Horn of Africa". Features. Liberty. Vol. 19, no. 5. R.W. Bradford / Liberty Foundation. pp. 30ff. Archived from the original on October 18, 2005.
- Spencer H. MacCallum (2003). "The Enterprise of Community; Market Competition, Land, and Environment" (PDF). Journal of Libertarian Studies. 17 (4). Mises Institute: 1–15. ISSN 1086-1653. (revised 2007).
- MacCallum, Spencer Heath (December 19, 2003). "Looking Back and Forward". Walter Block's Autobiography Archive. LewRockwell.com. Archived from the original on September 27, 2012.
- Spencer H. MacCallum (Fall 1997). "The Quickening of Social Evolution" (PDF). Independent Review. 2 (2): 287–302. ISSN 1086-1653. (Version revised by the author, 2004).
- Spencer H. MacCallum; Jan Bell; Scott H. Ryerson; and Michael A. Williams: "The Pottery and Potters of Mata Ortiz, Chihuahua, Kiva," Volume 60, Number 1, Arizona Archeological & Historical Soc., 1994.
- Spencer H. MacCallum: The Art of Community, Institute for Humane Studies, 1970. ASIN B001TC0TGS; The Art of Community, via the Internet Archive
- Mac Callum, Spencer (Winter 1964). "The Social Nature of Ownership". Modern Age. 9 (1). Chicago, Ill.: Foundation for Foreign Affairs / Intercollegiate Studies Institute: 49–61. ISSN 0026-7457. ProQuest 1301751701.
