= Casas Grandes Municipality =

Municipality in Chihuahua state, Mexico

Casas Grandes
- Municipality
- Municipio de Casas Grandes
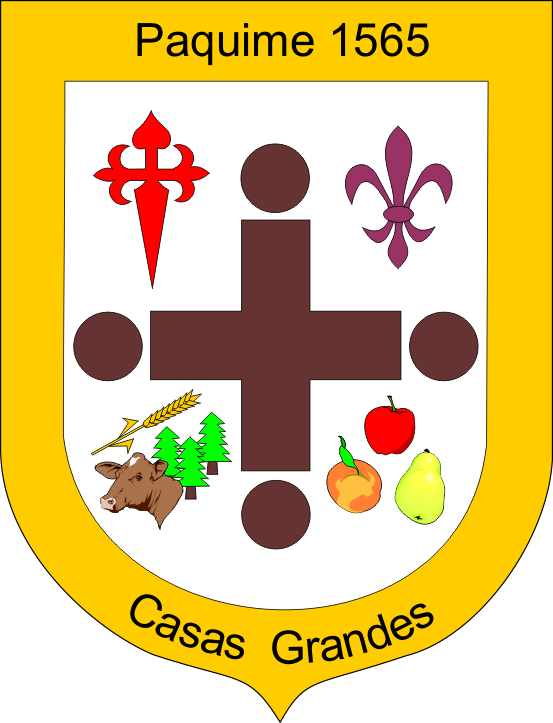
- Coat of arms

- location within the state of Chihuahua

- location of cabecera municipal within Mexico
- Coordinates (municipal seat): 30°22′31″N 107°56′54″W
- Country: Mexico
- State: Chihuahua
- Settlement founded: 1661
- Municipality created: 1820
- Founder: Captain Andrés Gracia
- Cabecera municipal (Municipal seat): Casas Grandes
- localidades (localities): Principal localities (2005 population): Pueblo de Casas Grandes (3,433); Colonia Juárez (1,357); Juan Mata Ortiz (949); Colonia Enríquez (598); Ejido Guadalupe Victoria (414)

Government election held July 1, 2007
  - Type: H. Ayuntamiento Municipal (municipal government)
  - Presidente Municipal: Dagoberto Quintana Cano (PAN)

Area
  - Municipality: 3,719 km^{2} (1,436 sq mi)
  - Urban: 3.82 km^{2} (1.47 sq mi)
- Elevation: 1,480 m (4,860 ft)

Population (2010)
  - Municipality: 10,587
  - Density: 2.847/km^{2} (7.373/sq mi)
- Time zone: UTC-6 (Central Standard Time)
- códigos postales (postal codes): 31850 through to 31863
- Area code: 636
- INEGI state code: 08
- INEGI municipality code: 013

Casas Grandes Municipality is located in the northern Mexican state of Chihuahua. The municipal seat is the town of Casas Grandes, Chihuahua.

The pre-Columbian archaeological zone Casas Grandes and its central site, after which the municipality is named, is located within the municipality's territory. The site of Casas Grandes, alternatively known as Paquimé, is one of the most significant pre-Columbian cultural and archaeological sites in the region of northwestern Mexico and the southwestern United States known in some archaeological contexts as the Oasisamerica culture area.

== Geography ==
The municipality of Casas Grandes is situated in the northwestern sector of Chihuahua state, the largest state of Mexico by area. (Pueblo de) Casas Grandes, the municipal capital and its most populous localidad (locality or settlement), is approximately 359 kilometres (223 mi) to the northwest of the state's capital, the city of Chihuahua. Casas Grandes is bounded by the Chihuahuan municipalities of Janos to the north, Galeana, Nuevo Casas Grandes and Madera to the east, and Ignacio Zaragoza to the south. On its western flank, Casas Grandes adjoins municipalities within the state of Sonora.

=== Demographics ===
As of 2010, the municipality had a total population of 10,587, up from 8,413 as of 2005.

As of 2010, the town of Casas Grandes had a population of 5,256. Other than the town of Casas Grandes, the municipality had 296 localities, the largest of which (with 2010 populations in parentheses) were: Juan Mata Ortíz (Pearson) (1,182) and Colonia Juárez (1,035), classified as rural.
