= Juan Quezada Celado =

Mexican potter (1940-2022)

Juan Quezada Celado (6 May 1940 - 1 December 2022) was a Mexican potter known for the re-interpretation of Casas Grandes pottery known as Mata Ortiz pottery. Quezada is from a poor rural town in Chihuahua, who discovered and studied pre Hispanic pottery of the Mimbres and Casas Grandes cultures. He eventually worked out how the pots were made with no help from ceramicists or specialists in these cultures. Initial attempts to sell the pots in his area failed, but he did have success with border merchants. These brought the pottery to shops on the U.S. side of the border, where they were discovered by Spencer MacCallum, an anthropologist who tracked Quezada down and helped him break into the larger U.S. market. Quezada’s success in pottery sparked interest in the activity by others in the town and he responded by teaching family and friends. Today there are over 300 families who earn all or part of their income from the pottery. Quezada’s work has been displayed in museums in various countries and in 1999 he was awarded the Premio Nacional de Ciencias y Artes. Despite this, his work was relatively unknown in Mexico during his lifetime.

== Early life and discovery of pottery ==
Juan Quezada Celado was born in the town of Tutuaca, in the municipality of Belisario Domínguez, Chihuahua. He moved to the town of Mata Ortíz when he was a baby, and grew up with little schooling, which he did not like. At that time, Mata Ortíz was only three blocks wide, and had been in decline economically since the Mexican Revolution.

Since childhood, he liked to work with his hands, trying to paint and sculpt with the few tools he had at age seven. He experimented with painting all kinds of surfaces such as wood, paper and even the walls of his house, filling those until his mother would make him clean them to start over again. This was noticed by the local government, which offered to send him to art school, but he refused. He believes that was a good decision.

When he was younger, he also boxed, with his friend Pino Molina as manager. Although he says he never lost a fight, he gave it up because his mother was worried.

As a teenager, he quit school to start earning money to help his family. At age fourteen, he began to collect firewood in the mountains and then worked for the railroad and collected maguey cactus. These jobs had him spend long stretches in the surrounding mountains, where he found pre Hispanic pots and pot shards from the Mimbres and Casas Grandes cultures in caves and other places. He collected these to examine, impressed by their artistic quality.

Casas Grandes pottery flourished between 1175 and 1400 and is closely related to the larger Pueblo family. However, since then the tradition died out for about 600 years. No one in the Mata Ortiz area did pottery and there were no experts on the cultures to consult. Quezada did not even know the word in Spanish for a potter (alfarero) . In the early 1970s, he began experimenting with ways to duplicate the pots he found and studied, but progress took several years since he had no ceramics experience. One of his first discoveries was the need to add sand or other temper to keep the clay from cracking. Then he worked out that the pots were shaped by a disk of clay at the bottom, with the sides built up by the coil method. He experimented with various local minerals until he figured out to use rust for red, manganese for black and white from the clay itself. He experimented with the hair of various animals and even maguey cactus fiber before discovering that brushes of human hair produced the clean lines of the original pottery.

== Career ==
After perfecting his technique, Quezada found that he could not sell his wares and gave a number of his first pieces away as gifts. He tried selling in the city of Casas Grandes but without success. He decided to head to the United States with a friend to work and he brought a few of his pots to see if he could sell them there. He walked to a town called Palomas, on the border of New Mexico, where he found a shopkeeper who liked his work so much, he bought all Quezada had. This money convinced Juan to return home with his friend with an agreement that he would make the pot and the friend could bring them to the border to sell. It turned out to be better and better-paying work for both. Pieces of his work found their way across the border, where they sold far more easily.

It was in the border town of Deming, New Mexico where an American anthropologist named Spencer MacCallum found one of Quezada’s pots in 1976. The shop owner did not know who the artist was, so MacCallum went looking for other pots, following leads until he came to Mata Ortiz. Quezada was surprised at MacCallum’s interest. The American wanted more pots, but Quezada told him they took time and to return in two months. MacCallum kept his promise which began an eight-year business relationship between the two men. MacCallum wanted Quezada to continue developing his artistry, so he offered a stipend. With this support, Juan went beyond copying pre Hispanic pottery to modernizing the designs and forms. MacCallum provided contacts, sales experience and more to gain access to markets by showing pieces to museum curators, academics, gallery owners and others. These efforts allowed Quezada to exhibit at prestigious galleries in Arizona, New Mexico and California in 1979 and 1980 under the name of Juan Quezada and the New Tradition, establishing Mata Ortiz pottery as a legitimate art movement. This collection was kept intact and eventually donated in its entirety to the San Diego Museum of Man in 1997.

During this time Quezada developed other business contacts, returning to his former boxing manager, Pino, to help develop his business. Pino would wind up helping most of Mata Ortiz’s potters with their businesses as well.

Success in sales led to offers to demonstrate and present in the United States. However, the first time he went to the US to demonstrate his pottery technique, he was very nervous with people watching him, enough to go to the hospital. He eventually was able to adjust.

Quezada’s works now sell for hundreds and even thousands of dollars in the United States, and is regularly exhibited in Arizona, California and New Mexico. Success in Mexico came later in the 1990s, first in Nuevo León then in Chihuahua. He exhibited at the prestigious Franz Mayer Museum in Mexico City in 1999. He continues to give occasional classes in the United States and has received offers of long term employment there, but has declined to move away from his hometown.

His work has been covered in various books, doctoral thesis and periodicals and can be found in major museums in the United States, Europe and Japan. In 1998, the state of Chihuahua recognized his work with a plaque, which was followed in 1999 by the Premio Nacional de Ciencias y Artes. His work has also received recognition from the Congress of the United States. However, despite this, he still remains relatively unknown in his native Mexico.

Despite his international fame, he still lives a basic rural life in modest surroundings. The father of eight children, his manner and dress are typical of Mexican northerners, with cowboy boots, hat and distinctive accent. He has moved from his original home in the town of Mata Ortiz to a ranch on a rocky riverbank of the Palanganas River overlooking the town. The property is called Rancho Barro Blanco (White Clay Ranch) in honor of the pottery. The ranch house lacks the pots he is known for but his house in Mata Ortiz property is filled with them along with his awards and photographs documenting his career.

== Artistry ==
Quezada makes his pieces with simple tools. The pots are initially built using the coil method, then they are scraped with a hacksaw blade to their final shape. He fires the pots in small groups in an inverted flower pot saggar, covered in cottonwood bark or cow manure which is set on fire. Originally Juan covered pieces in a clay slip before painting. In the early 1980s he devised a new way to make a smoother surface for paintings by sanding the surface with a stone or deer bone then covering liberally with oil and polishing. This allows for a greater refinement in the painted designs. The fineness of these paintings has greatly enhanced the value of the wares. The pots are painted with clay slips and mineral pigments. Brushes can be as slim as a few strands of human hair.

Quezada states that every pot he makes “speaks to him differently.” Although Juan considers the Mimbres tradition as part of his heritage, which pottery work follows that of Casas Grandes. Quezada’s pottery takes on a variety of forms, including low, open bowls he called cazuelas. A taller version of this is called cajetes. Big-bellied pots are called panzoncitos. Taller, narrower containers are called cantaros and all the forms are collectively called ollas (Spanish for pot) . One major break in Quezada’s work with the past is the loss of the horizontal banding in the design system, instead taking advantage of the three-dimensional medium by having overlapping design, often on a diagonal axis. This innovation suggests movement.

== The Mata Ortiz movement ==
With his initial success in selling the pottery, his friends and family took an interest in making the wares. Quezada decided to share the techniques he developed, with his first student being his sister Lydia Quezada, followed by Taurina Baca and other family and friends. A number of his brothers and sisters have become master potters in their own right such as Nicholas, Reynaldo and Lydia, along with Consolación, Reynalda, Rosa, Jesús and Genoveva. This family and number of close neighbors become the core of the Mata Ortiz movement.

This movement grew as the popularity of the pottery grew, especially in the United States in the 1980s and 1990s. Juan’s work has resulted in about 300 families who earn all or part of their income from pottery, making it the main economic activity of the town, making Mata Ortiz one of the main ceramics center of the northern Mexico/southwest U.S. region.

These potters develop their own styles, but all reflect Quezada’s original interpretation of Casas Grandes pottery. The range of styles varies from almost faithful reproduction of the old designs to stylized realism or purely geometric motifs. One reason for the continued success of Mata Ortiz pottery is that from the beginning Quezada emphasized quality and artistry, which are still important to all the potters that follow.
