= Nuevo Casas Grandes =

City in the Mexican state of Chihuahua

Coordinates: 30°25′N 107°55′W

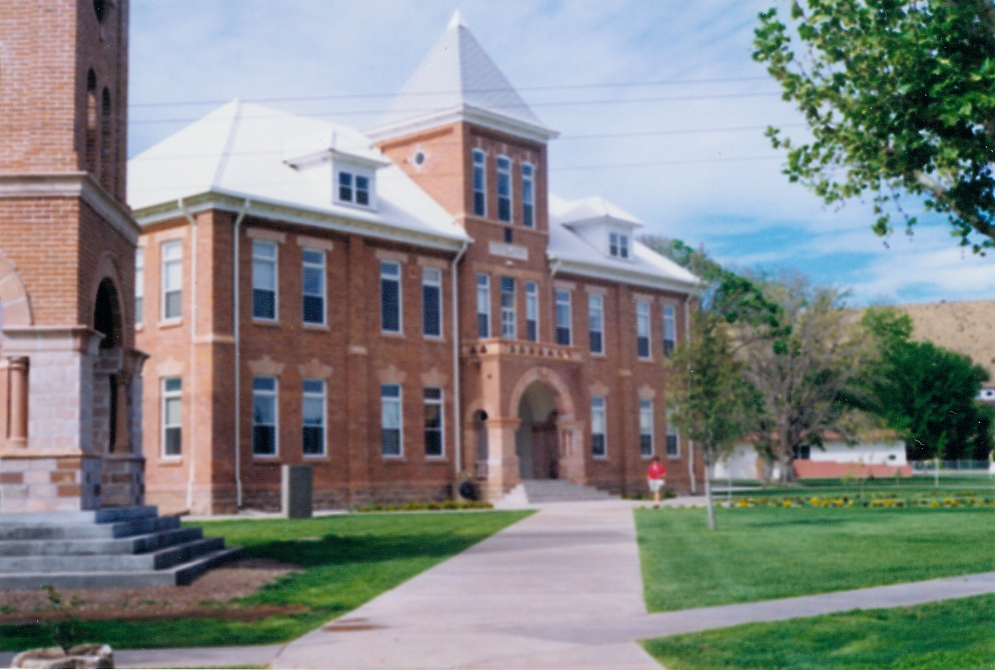
- Academia Juárez, part of the Mormon community from Colonia Juárez.

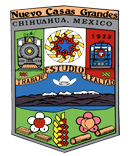
- Coat of arms

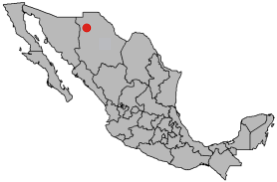
- Country: Mexico
- State: Chihuahua

Government
  - Mayor: Edith Escarcega PT Morena
- Elevation: 1,457 m (4,780 ft)

Population (2010)
  - Total: 55,553

Nuevo Casas Grandes is a city and the seat of the Nuevo Casas Grandes Municipality in northern Mexico. It is located in the northwestern part of the state of Chihuahua, on the Casas Grandes or San Miguel river, situated in a wide, fertile valley on the 4,000-foot Mesa del Norte of the Plateau of Mexico. Nearby is the Sierra Madre Occidental.

== Population ==
As of 2010, the city of Nuevo Casas Grandes had a population of 55,553, up from 50,863 as of 2005. The city was founded in the 1870s. Nuevo Casas Grandes got its name from another town about a mile away called Casas Grandes. A train station was built in that area and soon people migrated near it. Many of the region's inhabitants were of Native American ethnic groups closely related to those of the American Southwest.

== History ==
The area around Nuevo Casas Grandes is noted for its great historical and archaeological heritage. Five miles southwest of Nuevo Casas Grandes is the most important archaeological site in northern Mexico, the Casas Grandes or Paquimé Archaeological Zone highlighted by the new Paquimé (which, translated to Spanish, means "Big Houses" or Casas Grandes) Museum. Nuevo Casas Grandes is also world-famous for the nearby "potter village" of Mata Ortiz an ejido and its revival of pottery in the ancient Paquimé tradition.

== Geography ==
=== Climate ===
Nuevo Casas Grandes has a semi-arid climate with hot summers, mild winters and warm transition seasons. The location gets quite high summer rainfall and frequent air frosts in winter.

Climate data for Nuevo Casas Grandes (1951–2010)
Month	Jan	Feb	Mar	Apr	May	Jun	Jul	Aug	Sep	Oct	Nov	Dec	Year
Record high °C (°F)	31.5 (88.7)	33.0 (91.4)	33.5 (92.3)	36.5 (97.7)	40.5 (104.9)	43.5 (110.3)	41.5 (106.7)	39.5 (103.1)	41.0 (105.8)	39.5 (103.1)	33.5 (92.3)	27.5 (81.5)	43.5 (110.3)
Mean daily maximum °C (°F)	16.2 (61.2)	18.5 (65.3)	21.7 (71.1)	26.0 (78.8)	30.4 (86.7)	34.4 (93.9)	33.0 (91.4)	31.6 (88.9)	30.1 (86.2)	26.2 (79.2)	20.3 (68.5)	16.3 (61.3)	25.4 (77.7)
Daily mean °C (°F)	7.6 (45.7)	9.5 (49.1)	12.6 (54.7)	16.7 (62.1)	20.8 (69.4)	25.3 (77.5)	25.5 (77.9)	24.2 (75.6)	22.0 (71.6)	17.3 (63.1)	11.3 (52.3)	7.7 (45.9)	17.0 (62.6)
Mean daily minimum °C (°F)	−1.0 (30.2)	0.6 (33.1)	3.6 (38.5)	7.4 (45.3)	11.3 (52.3)	16.2 (61.2)	17.9 (64.2)	16.8 (62.2)	14.0 (57.2)	8.4 (47.1)	2.4 (36.3)	−0.8 (30.6)	8.1 (46.6)
Record low °C (°F)	−21.5 (−6.7)	−18.7 (−1.7)	−8.0 (17.6)	−5.0 (23.0)	−0.5 (31.1)	5.0 (41.0)	9.0 (48.2)	7.0 (44.6)	3.3 (37.9)	−6.0 (21.2)	−11.0 (12.2)	−15.0 (5.0)	−21.5 (−6.7)
Average precipitation mm (inches)	13.1 (0.52)	10.8 (0.43)	8.0 (0.31)	5.9 (0.23)	6.7 (0.26)	15.7 (0.62)	83.9 (3.30)	79.1 (3.11)	40.2 (1.58)	24.8 (0.98)	21.2 (0.83)	16.7 (0.66)	326.1 (12.84)
Average precipitation days (≥ 0.1 mm)	3.7	2.9	2.9	1.5	2.0	3.9	14.6	13.4	7.4	4.3	3.4	3.9	63.9
Average relative humidity (%)	51	47	41	36	35	40	55	62	59	55	51	57	49
Mean monthly sunshine hours	232	234	290	308	329	306	270	262	260	280	251	232	3,254
Source 1: Servicio Meteorológico Nacional (humidity 1981–2000)
Source 2: Ogimet (sun 1981–2010)

== Culture ==
The city is the see city of the Roman Catholic Diocese of Nuevo Casas Grandes. Nearby Nuevo Casas Grandes are Mennonite and Mormon communities. Both of those groups are bilingual with Spanish as their second language. However most of the Mormons in the region are of Mexican descent and speak Spanish as their mother tongue. The Mennonites are Old Colony Mennonites (not to be confused with Old Order Mennonites who live in Canada, the United States and Belize) and speak a German dialect called Plautdietsch as their primary language in addition to Standard German and Spanish, while those in the Mormon community are of American descent and speak English.

As Nuevo Casas Grandes has grown in the last few decades, it now meets on the north side with the Mormon colony, Colonia Dublán. Many who reside near Nuevo Casas Grandes endeavor to maintain orchards which grow a variety fruits, including peaches, apples, pears, and pecans. Shade and street trees include ash, cypress, deodar, eucalyptus, mulberry, pine, and sycamore. There is also significant activity in wheat and cattle.

== Transportation ==
The city is served by the Nuevo Casas Grandes Municipal Airport (IATA: NCG, ICAO: MMCG).

== Sister cities ==
Nuevo Casas Grandes has two sister cities:

- (United States) Colorado Springs, Colorado
- (United States) Fallon, Nevada

== See also ==
- Casas Grandes
