= Colonia Juárez =

Colonia Juárez may refer to:

- Colonia Juárez, Mexico City
- Colonia Juárez, Chihuahua
