= John Hatch =

John Hatch may refer to:

- John Hatch (development specialist), American economic development expert
- John Hatch (basketball, born 1947), Mexican basketball player
- John Hatch (basketball, born 1962), Canadian basketball player
- John Porter Hatch (1822–1901), American Civil War general
- John Hatch, Baron Hatch of Lusby, British author, broadcaster, lecturer and politician
