= Brigham Young University Museum of Peoples and Cultures =

Coordinates: 40°15′47.2″N 111°39′27.9″W

- Location: Provo, Utah, United States
- Type: University museum
- Website: mpc.byu.edu

The Brigham Young University Museum of Peoples and Cultures, located in Provo, Utah, is the university's museum of archaeology and ethnology. The Museum of Peoples and Cultures has a wide variety of collections containing over a million objects. Most of the 7,000 collections come from the regions of South America, Mesoamerica, Central America, the American Southwest, the Great Basin and Polynesia. However, there are many objects from other parts of the world which are available for study and research.

== History ==
From about 1980 until 2014 the museum was located in BYU's Allen Hall. In 2014 a new facility was opened at 2201 N. Canyon Road a few blocks north of the BYU football stadium.

== Collections and archives ==
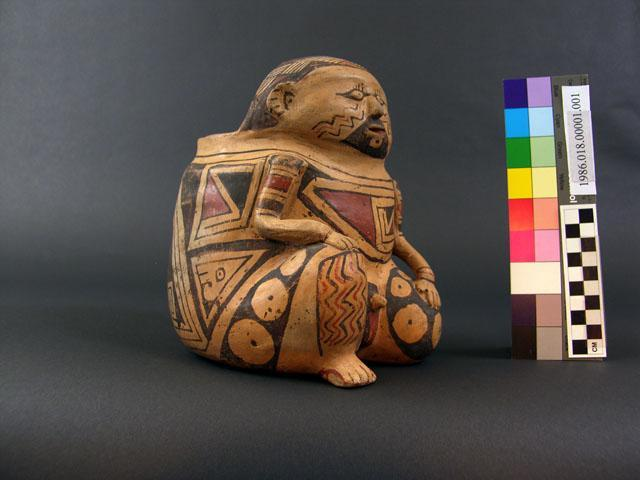
Human Effigy Jar from Casas Grandes

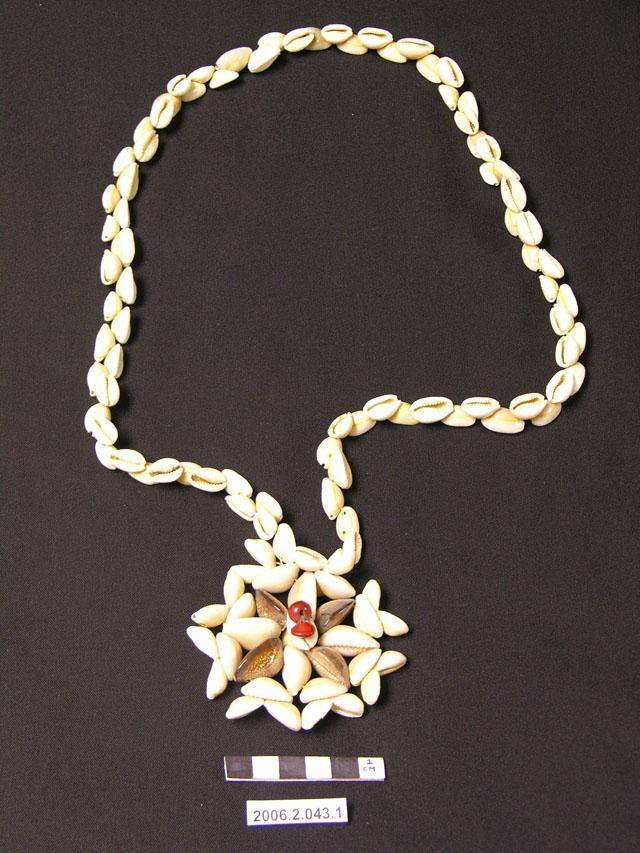
Shell Necklace from Polynesia

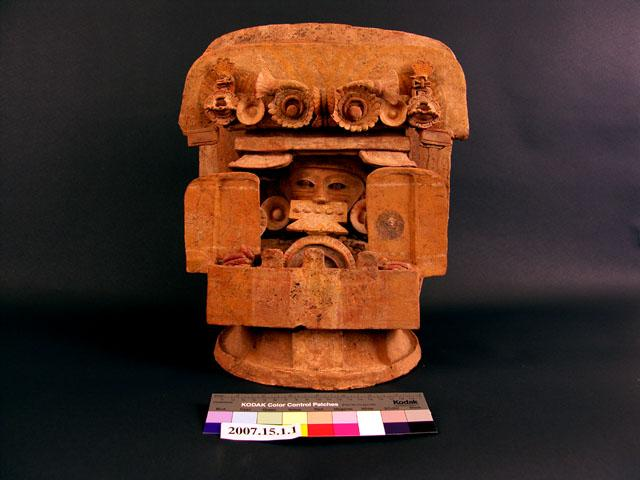
Incense Burner from Mesoamerica

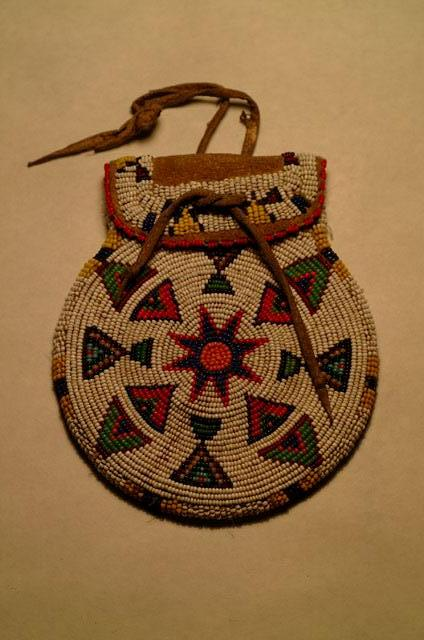
Ute Leather Pouch

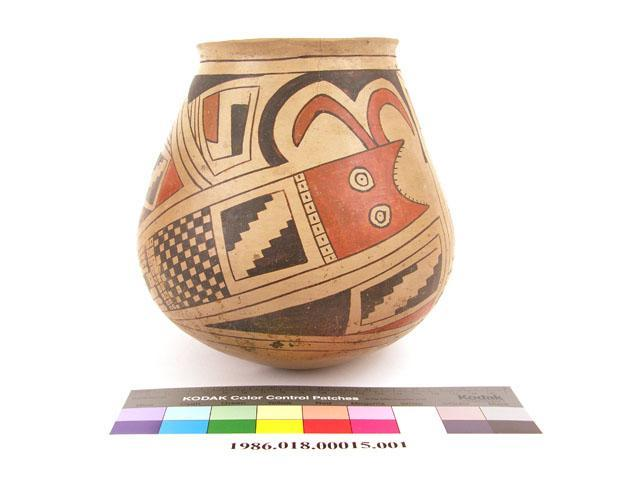
Pot from Casas Grandes

=== South America ===
Many of the Museum’s accessions come from the South American continent. One of the notable collections of the MPC is the ancient Andean textiles. The Spoerl Collection and the Cheesman Collection account for the majority of these textiles. The Spoerl Collection contains mostly textiles and textile production tools but the Cheesman Collection contains other ancient and modern artifacts from South America. The majority of the textiles from both collections date from the prehistoric period in Peru. There is a current exhibit, "Greater than Gold: Textiles of the Ancient Andes", displaying many of these textiles that will run through late 2016.

- The Spoerl Collection contains 581 items and includes: Ancient Andean textiles, textile fragments, cordage fragments, textile tools.
- The Cheesman Collection contains 759 items and includes: Ancient Andean textiles, textile fragments, textile tools, pottery (bowls, jars, effigies, figurines), projectile points.

=== Mesoamerica and Central America ===
The Museum also has many accessions from Mesoamerica and Central America. Four select collections that contain a variety of artifacts from ancient and modern cultures of this region are the Cluff, Barlow, Bowen, and Krenusz Collections. The Barlow Collection is specifically from Costa Rica and Nicaragua and contains mostly ancient pottery. However, there are other artifacts such as axe heads and projectile points within the collection. The Birrell Collection contains ethnographic textiles from Mesoamerica and South America. Many of the pieces within this collection are women’s clothing such as skirts, sashes, hair wraps and huipils. The collection also contains a variety of woven blankets, rugs, and bags. However, the MPC ethnographic textile collection is not limited to Mesoamerica and South America but contains examples from other parts of the world. The Bowen Collection contains fine examples of ancient Mesoamerican pottery. The Krenusz Collection contains little pottery but has other important pieces like metal axe heads, blades and projectile points. The jade figurines and jewelry are also a highlight of this collection. Some of the most unusual objects from the Krenusz Collection are the ancient Mexican stamps which display a variety of animal and geometric designs. The Cluff Collection contains unusual black pottery which was acquired on an expedition by Benjamin Cluff to the American Southwest and Mesoamerica in the early 20th century.

- The Barlow Collection contains 270 items and includes: Ancient Costa Rican and Nicaraguan pottery (jars, bowls, effigies, figurines, sherds), axe heads, projectile points.
- The Birrell Collection contains 355 items and includes: Ethnographic textiles from South America and Mesoamerica, women’s clothing (skirts, sashes, hair warps, huipils), blankets, rugs, bags and purses.
- The Bowen Collection contains 98 items and includes: Ancient pottery (jars, bowls, figurines), manos, metates, cord sandals, projectile points, lithics.
- The Cluff Collection contains 182 items and includes: Early 20th century black glazed pottery (jars, effigies, bowls, figurines, ladles, spoons).
- The Krenusz Collection contains 692 items and includes: Ancient metal axe heads, blades, scrapers, projectile points, stamps, ear spools, jade figurines and jewelry.

=== The American Southwest and Great Basin ===
The American Southwest and the Great Basin is another region that accounts for a large portion of the Museum’s collections. One select collection from this area is the Dillman Collection. This collection contains a variety of Ute objects made in the 1930s on Native American reservations in eastern Utah. This collection contains mostly baskets and leather pieces but there are some archeological objects as well. The leather pieces in particular exhibit the superb craftsmanship of the Ute artists and show how their beliefs influenced their work. Part of this collection was on display in the early 1990s.

The recently acquired Reidhead Collection from the site of Fourmile Ruin in Arizona is another impressive holding of the Museum. Altogether this collection contains 8,712 items including 1,000 whole vessels and 2,000 arrowheads. The pottery is the main highlight of this collection and displays a variety of Hopi Yellow Ware and White Mountain Red Ware. Additionally, there are a variety of other artifacts which reveal more about the Native American civilization at Fourmile Ruin. Some of the objects from this collection are part of the Museum's current exhibit New Lives: Building Community at Fourmile Ruin.

The Turley Collection contains objects from Casas Grandes. Most of the collection contains pottery styles such as Ramos Black, Madera Black-on-Red and Villa Ahumada. Although the majority of the pottery in this collection is in the form of pots and bowls, there are also impressive examples of effigy jars. The pottery displays a variety of geometric designs and patterns and is frequently intermixed with representative drawings of animals and plants.

- The Dillman Collection contains 709 items and includes: Ancient and ca. 1930s Ute baskets, leather pieces (moccasins, belts, purses, pouches, gloves), game pieces, manos, metates, some pottery.
- The Reidhead Collection contains 8,712 items and includes: Ancient pottery from Fourmile Ruin (bowls, jars, ladles, effigies, canteens), pottery sherds, projectile points, shell beads, jewelry, blankets, and sandals.
- The Turley Collection contains 683 items and includes : Casas Grandes pottery (bowls, jars, effigies, figurines), projectile points, bone awls, metates and manos, necklaces, pendants, game pieces, bells, grinders, and scrapers.

=== Polynesia ===
Polynesia is another important area of collections. Two select collections that contribute to the Polynesian collection are the Snow Collection and the Clark Collection. Both of these contain a number of tapa cloths and mats. The Snow Collection also displays many examples of jewelry and fans and the Dacosta Clark Collection contains spears, blades and clothing. Other Polynesian collections contain a variety of baskets, carved figurines and totems, and ceremonial clothing. These objects provide a deeper understanding of the cultures of Fiji, Hawaii, Samoa, Tonga and Australia.

- The Snow Collection contains 211 items and includes; tapa cloths and mats, jewelry, fans, purses, fishing tools, spears, and daggers.
- The Dacosta Clark Collection contains 105 items and includes: tapa cloths and mats, jewelry, fans, blades, spears, shells, baskets, women’s skirts.

=== Brigham Young University Department of Anthropology Excavations ===
The Museum also has extensive excavated collections from the Department of Anthropology. There are over 100,000 lots which contain over 1 million individual artifacts of sherds, lithics, projectile points and soil samples. The artifacts come from various archaeological sites across Utah with an emphasis in the areas of Utah Valley and southeastern and central Utah. Along with the Excavated Collections, the Museum also holds a large collection of photographs and notes that document archeological sites and artifacts researched by the BYU Anthropology Department. There are over 30,000 photographs that document the various sites and artifacts found in Southern Mexico and Utah. Field notes from expeditions and digs conducted by the BYU Anthropology Department are also available from as early as the 1930s.

- Excavated Collections contains over 100,000 lots (over 1 million individual artifacts) and includes:excavated sherds, lithics, projectile points, and soil samples etc. from Utah archaeological sites.
- Archaeological Archives contains 30,000 items and includes: photographs (including slides and negatives) and notes documenting archeological sites and artifacts from Mexico and Utah dating from ca. 1930 to the present.

== Public programs ==
The Museum offers a wide variety of programs, events, and activities including: semi-monthly family home evenings, monthly date nights, summer programs for children, weekly story time for toddlers and preschool age children, annual participation in Utah Prehistory Week and national Celebrate Your Museum Day. Additionally, docent led tours are available during regular Museum hours. Visiting Boy Scouts can complete a worksheet related to the exhibits to earn a scout activity patch.

== In the news ==
The Museum of Peoples and Cultures has been featured in several articles in a variety of publications including the BYU Daily Universe, The Salt Lake Tribune, The Daily Herald and Deseret News related to faculty, exhibitions, activities and events. The Museum also has a monthly newsletter which keeps the community updated about upcoming exhibitions and events at the Museum.
