= Nuevo Casas Grandes Municipal Airport =

Airport in Nuevo Casas Grandes, Chihuahua, Mexico

Nuevo Casas Grandes National Airport Aeropuerto Nacional de Nuevo Casas Grandes
- IATA: NCG; ICAO: MMCG

Summary
- Airport type: Public
- Serves: Nuevo Casas Grandes, Chihuahua, Mexico
- Time zone: MST (UTC−07:00)
- Elevation AMSL: 1,465 m / 4,806 ft
- Coordinates: 30°23′51″N 107°52′30″W

Map
- Location of the airport in Chihuahua NCG (Mexico)

Runways
| Direction | Length | | Surface |
| Direction | m | ft | Surface |
|---|---|---|---|
| 13/31 | 1,852 | 6,076 | Asphalt |
| ~~04/22~~ (closed) | ~~716~~ | ~~2,350~~ | ~~Soil~~ |

Statistics (2023)
- Total Passengers: N/A
- Source: Agencia Federal de Aviación Civil

Nuevo Casas Grandes National Airport (IATA: NCG, ICAO: MMCG) is a small airport located in Nuevo Casas Grandes, Chihuahua, Mexico. It serves domestic air traffic for Nuevo Casas Grandes, supporting general aviation activities. It does not provide scheduled passenger public flights. The nearest airport that serves commercial flights is Ciudad Juárez International Airport.

Situated at an elevation of 1,465 metres (4,806 ft) above mean sea level, the airport features a single asphalt runway, designated as 13/31, measuring 1,852 by 20 metres (6,076 by 66 ft). Adjacent facilities include several hangars, an abandoned passenger terminal, and an apron with parking positions for small aircraft.

== See also ==
- List of the busiest airports in Mexico
- List of airports in Mexico
- List of airports by ICAO code: M
- List of busiest airports in North America
- List of the busiest airports in Latin America
- Transportation in Mexico
- Tourism in Mexico
- Ciudad Juárez International Airport
