= Mata Ortiz pottery =

Type of Mexican pottery based on ancient Mogollon pottery

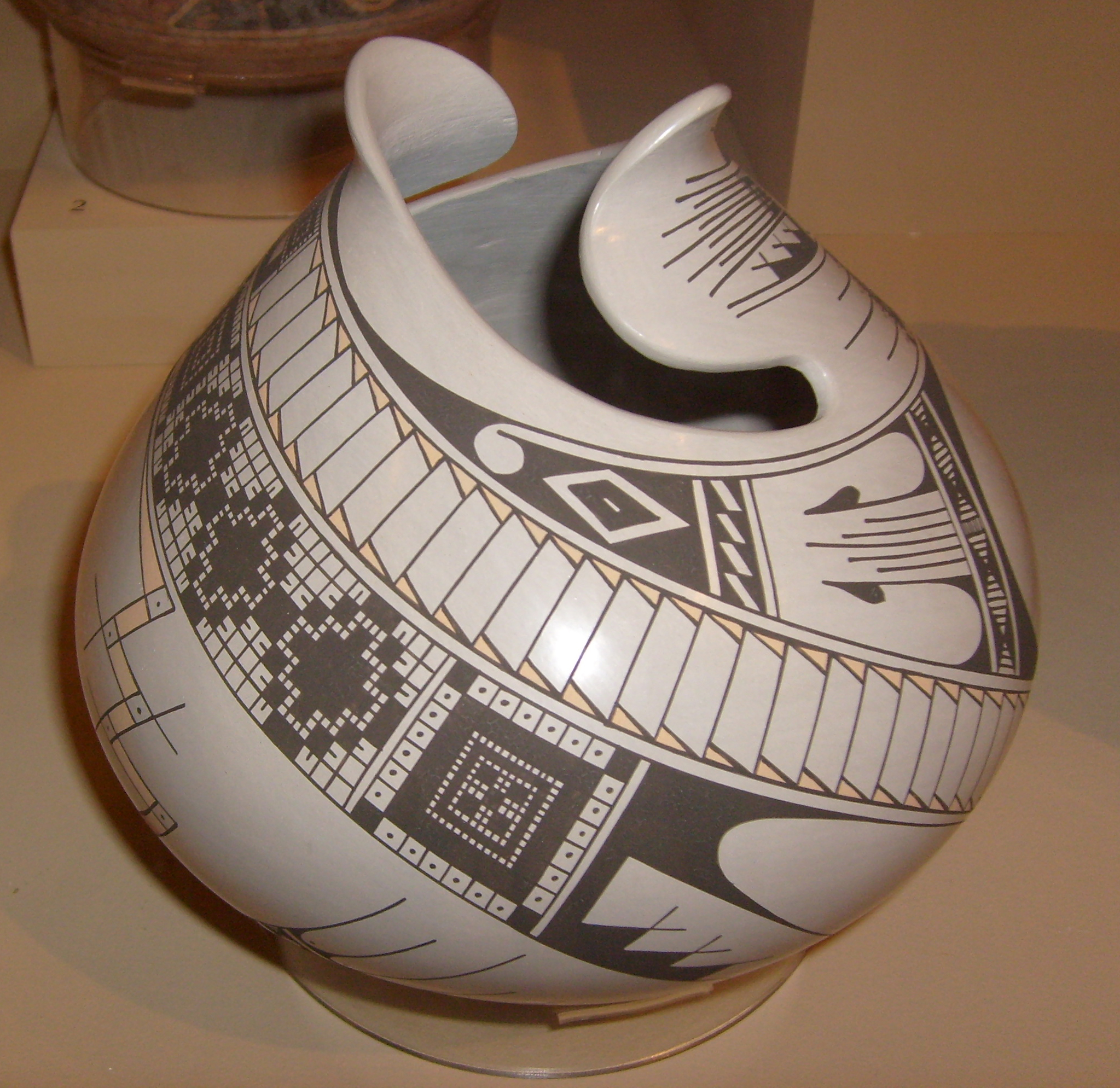
Mata Ortiz pottery jar by Jorge Quintana, 2002. Displayed at Museum of Man, San Diego.

Mata Ortiz pottery is a recreation of the Mogollon pottery found in and around the archeological site of Casas Grandes (Paquimé) in the Mexican state of Chihuahua. Named after the modern town of Mata Ortiz, which is near the archeological site, the style was propagated by Juan Quezada Celado. Quezada learned on his own to recreate this ancient pottery and then went on to update it. By the mid 1970s, Quezada was selling his pottery and teaching family and friends to make it and the pottery was able to penetrate the U.S. markets thanks to efforts by Spencer MacCallum and later Walt Parks along with Mexican traders. By the 1990s, the pottery was being shown in museums and other cultural institutions and sold in fine galleries. The success of the pottery, which is sold for its aesthetic rather than its utilitarian value, has brought the town of Mata Ortiz out of poverty, with most of its population earning income from the industry, directly or indirectly.

== The town ==
Mata Ortiz is located the Mexican state of Chihuahua about 4.5 hours south and west of El Paso, Texas, United States. It is a small town with adobe dwellings at the foothills of the Sierra Madre Occidental, along the banks of the Palanganas River.

Despite Mata Ortiz’s success the creation of pottery has not spread to surrounding towns.

== History of the ceramic ==
=== Paquimé archeological site ===
One critical element to the development of ceramics in Mata Ortiz is its proximity to the Paquimé or Casa Grandes archeological site. Paquimé is one of the most important archeological sites in northwest Mexico/southwest U.S. region and center of the Mogollon culture . This culture reached its peak around 1400, with evidence of its influence hundreds of kilometers from its center in present-day Chihuahua state. Excavations of Paquimé were undertaken between 1958 and 1961 by archeologist Charles C. Di Peso, which sparked local interest in the site. However, by the time the pottery revival began in Mata Ortiz, Paquimé had not been studied as well as other desert cultures in the region and there was little expert knowledge about its pottery. Since then, the Museo de las Culturas del Norte was opened at Paquimé in 1997 and it was declared a UNESCO World Heritage Site in 1998.

Paquimé pottery is closely related to the larger family of Pueblo pottery, showing influence from Arizona, New Mexico and central Mexico along with elements which are distinctive to the area. Various colors appear in the works including a nearly white ivory, a reddish color and black. Paquimé pottery was traded throughout North America.

=== Juan Quezada ===
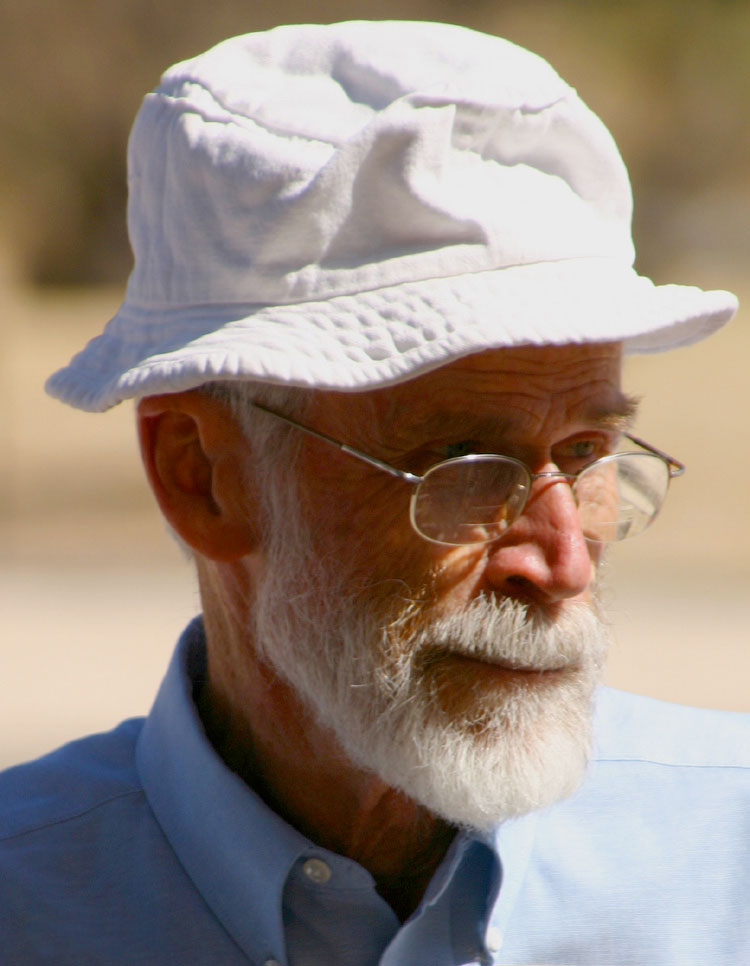
Spencer MacCallum

The pre Hispanic pottery tradition had been completely lost, but clay was still abundant in the area. Juan Quezada is credited for the revival and development of pottery making in the area. In the early 1960s, he was a very poor farmer who also collected firewood in the area of the Paquimé archeological site. He found fragments of Paquimé pottery and the even older Mimbres style, characterized by bold black-on-white zoomorphic designs. He also found local clay deposits and began experiments to determine how the ancient pottery was made. Unlike pottery revivals in Arizona and New Mexico, which depended on the help of experts, Quezada revived Paquimé pottery all on his own. For example, he found that vessels of pure clay were too brittle and after studying the edges of the broken old pottery, he discovered the use of sand and other coarse material as a temper. He also discovered that dried cow dung made an excellent, inexpensive firing fuel. By 1971 he had perfected a kind of polychrome pottery. Despite never receiving formal instruction, he succeeded in turning out high-quality vessels. His experiments have gone beyond recreated old style pottery. For example, one of his goals was to find a rich source of white clay, hard to find since it is untainted by other minerals. He finally found it when he looked at an anthill and noticed that the ants were bringing up small balls of white clay. This deposit happened to be on Quezada’s property but despite this, he allows other pottery to take advantage of it. However, the main innovations have been with the design and decoration of the pots, rather than the materials or the crafting process. He created new vessel shapes and modified the traditional painted designs to create a more fluid look. He also painted the entire vessel to give the designs a sense of movement.

Quezada gave his early pottery to family members and friends as gifts. By the mid 1970s, his wares began to be sold commercially and by the 1980s, he works were found in the best galleries of Arizona, New Mexico and California. At first traders wanted to pass off his work as ancient but soon his inventive designs were selling and soon after that began signing his works. Although Quezada had some sales to the United States, his work was introduced to a wide audience in the country by Spencer MacCallum. MacCallum found Quezada’s work at a second-hand store in Deming, New Mexico. He traveled through northern Mexico, showing photos of the pots and asking if anyone could tell him who had made them. The two men finally met in 1976, as Quezada was working on an order for 250 pots for a store in El Paso. Impressed with Quezada’s talent, MacCallum offered patronage to the potter, promising to buy and all pots made in exchange for Quezada’s continued experimentation and development of his craft. For nearly eight years, MacCallum provided financial support for Quezada, serving as mentor and agent. This agreement allowed Quezada to develop into a world class potter. MacCallum was largely responsible for bringing the pottery to the attention of museums and other art institutions. The first major exhibition of Quezada’s work was at the Arizona State Museum .

Soon after Quezada began selling his wares, he also began to teach the craft to his immediate family. They in turn taught other family members and friends. From the beginning, women were not excluded from this activity, even though work was scarce for men.

Today, Juan Quezada is acknowledged as the master potter of Mata Ortiz. In 1999, Quezada received the prestigious Premio Nacional de Ciencias y Artes award (handcraft and folk art category) from Mexican president Ernesto Zedillo .

=== Innovation and marketing ===
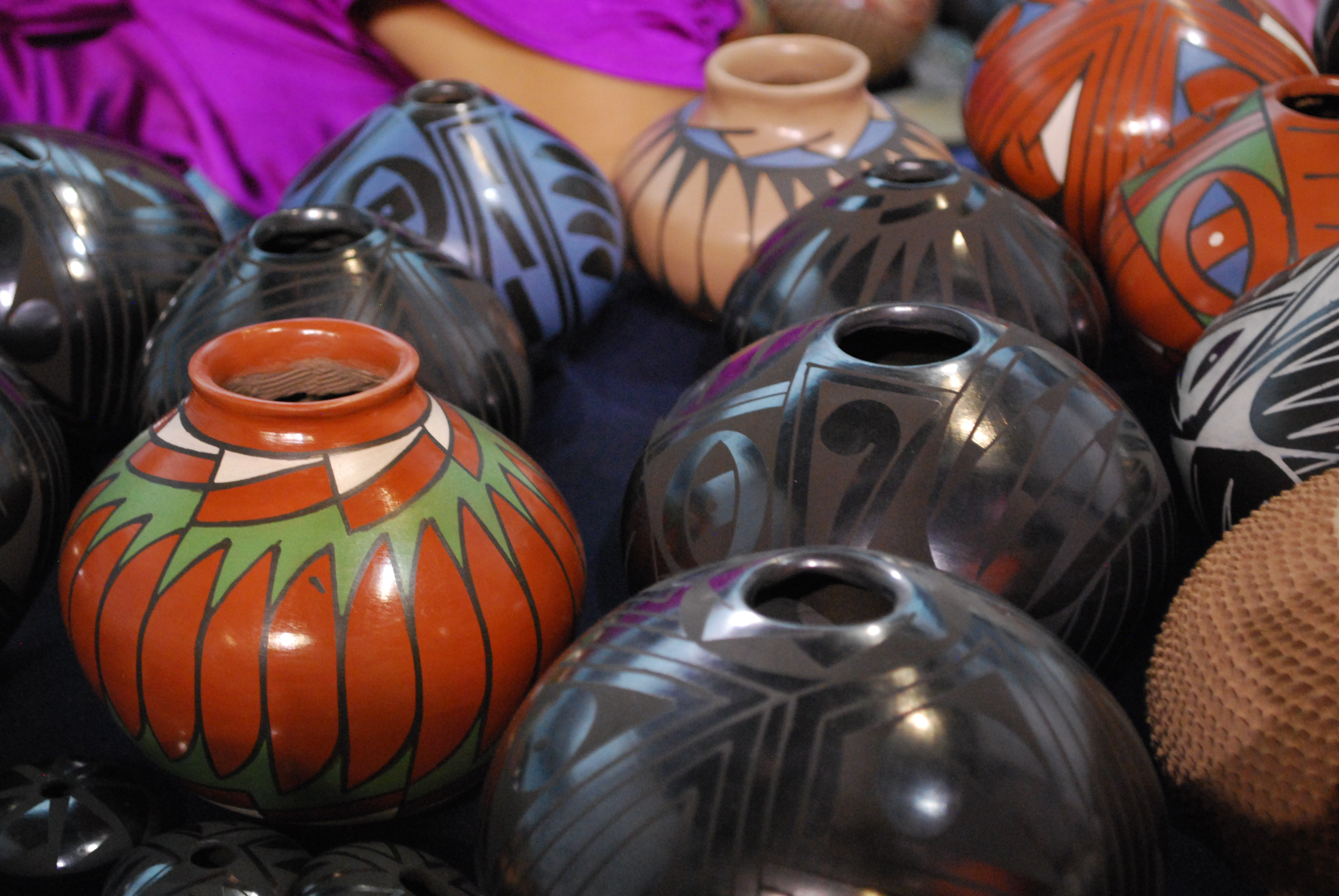
Mata Ortiz ceramics at a FONART exhibition in Mexico City

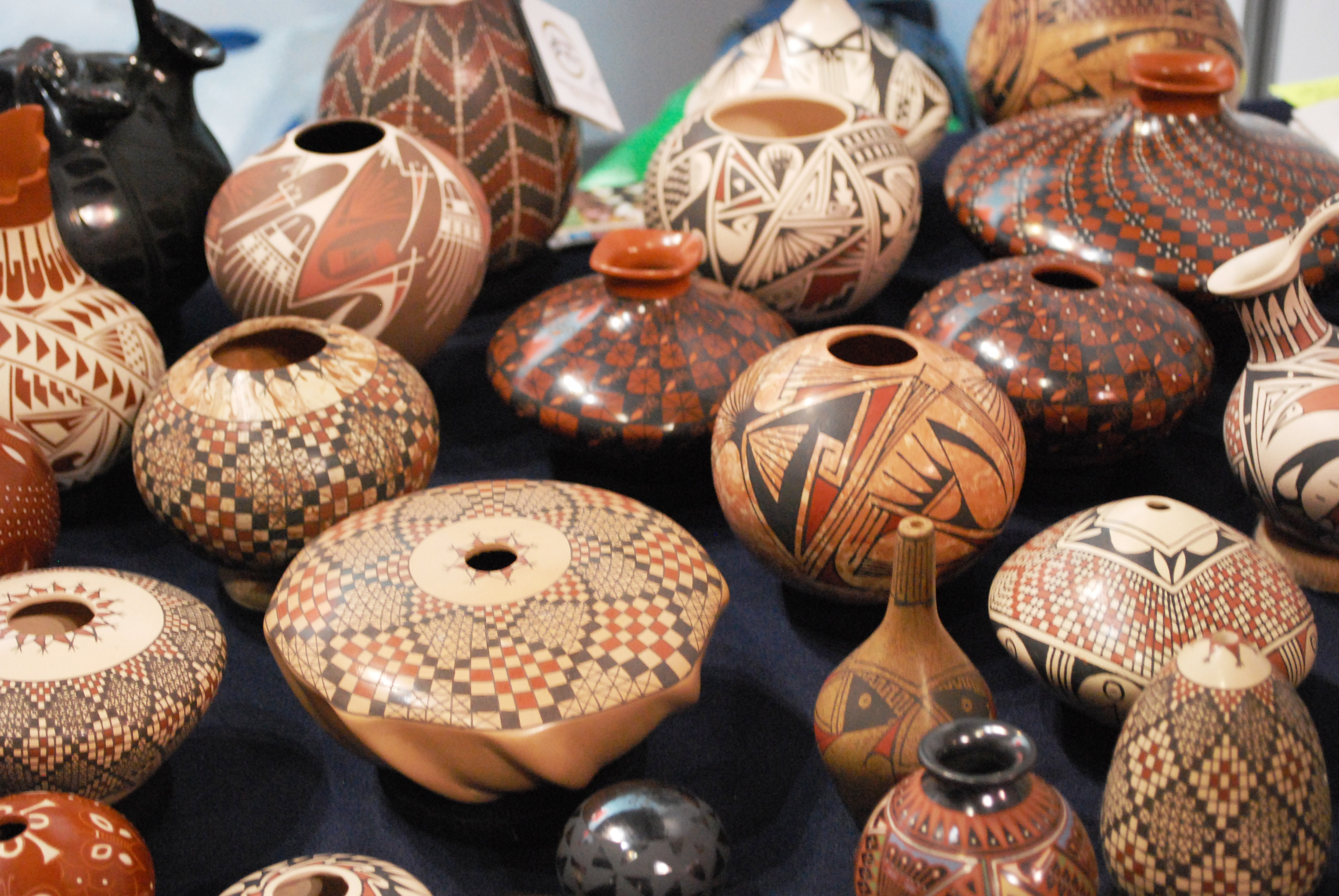
Mata Ortiz ceramics at a FONART exhibition in Mexico City

By the mid 1970s, Mata Ortiz pots by Juan Quezada were selling for several dollars apiece including to traders from El Paso, prompting him to teach the craft to his brothers and sisters. This includes Mata Ortiz’s most prominent female potter, sister Lydia Quezada Celado de Talavera, who is the first to have gained international prominence.

They taught it to the next generation and then to friends and neighbors. Following Quezada's lead, other potters moved quickly from copying designs from prehistoric potsherds to creating original motifs. While Quezada was interested in making all pottery from Mata Ortiz have a certain level of quality not all agreed. The Felix Ortiz family was the first to work on simpler pots of lesser quality but would still sell. They also created different designs and formed a new hub of pottery making in the El Porvenir neighborhood which then produced various other potters of various skill levels. In the 1980s, others began to learn pottery without the help of either the Quezada or Ortiz families. A number of husband-wife teams developed who formed their own signature styles. Quezada's departure from original ancient styles and with a large number of people now working on the pottery, further innovations have occurred. Quezada’s brother Reynaldo is credited with introducing mixed clays, giving a marbled effect. His sister Lydia began to paint bright colors on the popular black-on-black ceramics. Around 1982, Macario Ortiz began to apply graphite to the surface, which after firing becomes a smooth shiny surface. Younger potters learn from their elders but as they gain experience, develop their own individual style, but for young and old, what determines if a style remains is if it sells.

Mata Ortiz’s main success has been in the United States, especially from the 1980s to the 1990s. The first to do large scale promotion of the pottery in the country was amateur anthropologist Spencer MacCallum, who helped get Quezada his first museum showings. Another important figure in the marketing of the pottery has been Walt Parks, a business consultant, involved since 1984. He brings pots into the United States to sell, arranges exhibitions and classes and even offers free services as translator and financial advisor. Parks considers the pottery as a new art movement. While not the only American to promote the pottery, he has been the most dedicated, publishing a book about it in 1993 called The Miracle of Mata Ortiz and regularly writes and lectures on the subject. One phenomenon that helped Mata Ortiz was the revival of Southwest U.S. pottery styles, which had been occurring about the same time. Other early major exhibitions of Mata Ortiz ware were at the Heard Museum in Phoenix (1977), the Arizona State Museum (1977), Chaffey College (1979) and the Maxwell Museum of Anthropology (1979), which allowed the pottery to gain international attention. An exhibit called “Juan Quezada and the New Tradition” traveled to five venues in the United States and brought unprecedented attention to Mata Ortiz and expanded the market for their wares exponentially. However, there were no major exhibitions of the pottery in Mexico until 1999, when one opened at the Franz Mayer Museum in Mexico City . Today we can find Mata Ortiz Pottery in some galleries and museums of Mexico, a good example is Arte Marakame, as they have a permanent exhibition of the finest Mata Ortiz Pottery from several artists and techniques.

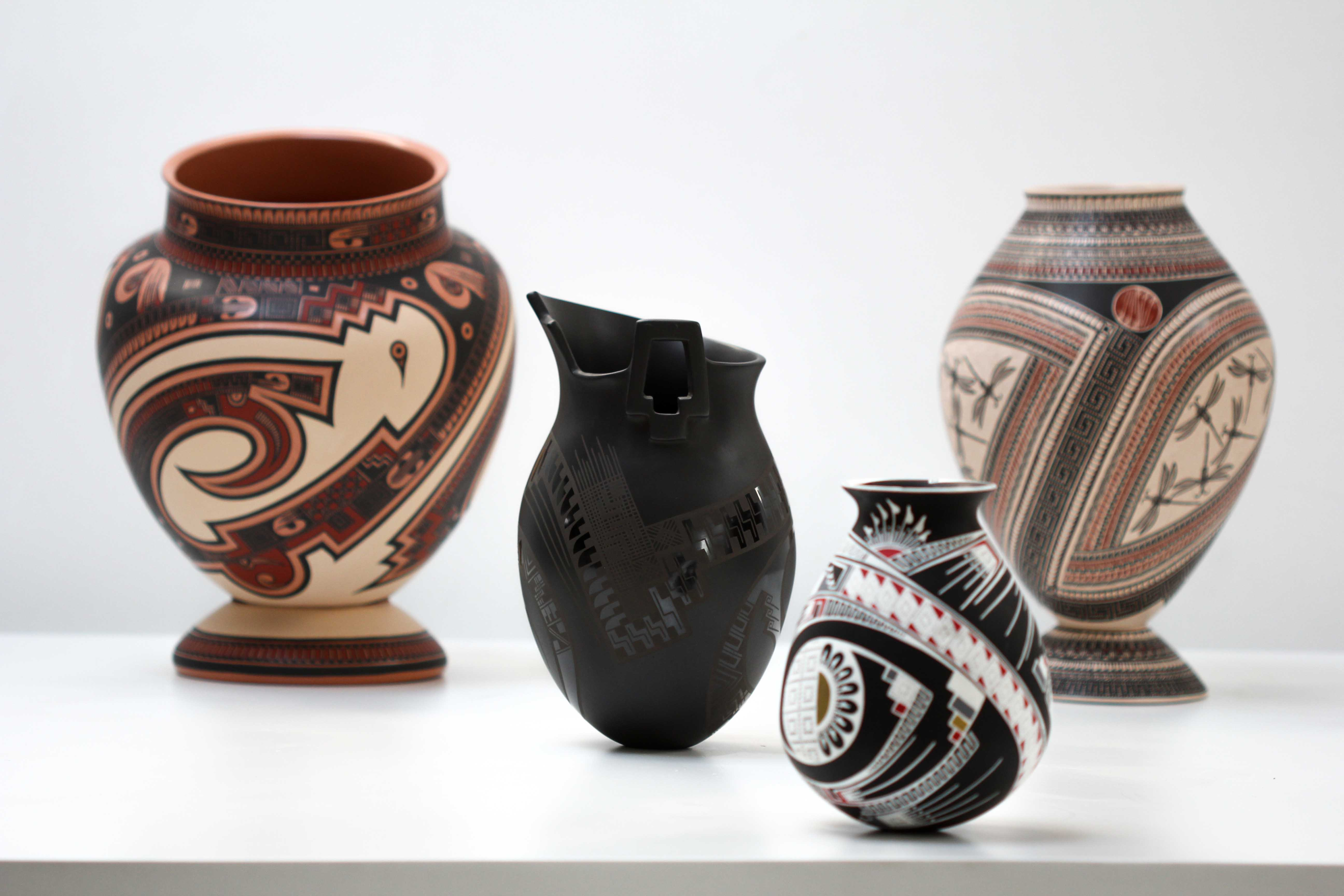
Mata Ortiz ceramics from different artists and techniques of the Arte Marakame collection.

By the 1990s, the success of the pottery was bringing prosperity to the town, with pottery family able to buy trucks, add rooms, bathrooms and kitchens to their houses. During this time about three out of four households tried making the pottery for the economic benefits. During this decade, demand constantly increased for wares, especially from accomplished potters, causing prices to rise, especially as demand developed from Mexico, Asia and Europe. The fame of the pottery began to bring buyers to the town of Mata Ortiz, looking for specific potters. The emphasis on foreign and high end markets has meant an emphasis on quality over quantity, although a demand for cheaper wares also meant niches for lower quality work as well. However, this does not fully explain how a rural community has been able to produce a large number of highly skilled artisans in such a short period of time. These potters do not consider themselves to be the direct descendants of the Pakimé culture and rarely are pieces not sold, meaning the impetus of the craft is economic, not cultural.

The 1990s and 2000s has attracted the attention of government handcraft agencies to the town, particularly FONART, which sponsors an annual ceramics competition to help new potters gain recognition. This intervention has also included training in ceramics and in marketing. One marketing innovation has been creation of a women’s micro-enterprise group called Grupo Pearson, followed shortly thereafter by Grupo Pakimé. The aim of these groups are to provide reliable income to members by sharing production and marketing tasks in order to be as self-sufficient as possible. Today, the younger generations have been around pottery all their lives, giving them a savvy in both the marketing and making of the craft that the older generations do not. They associate the craft with money and status, prompting many to become craftsmen full-time.

Mata Ortiz remains highly popular especially in the southwest United States and some other parts of the country. The best pieces now sell for thousands of dollars although good work can still be had for as little as five. Medium-sized vessels can bring up to $2,500 USD. Most pieces are priced in dollars because most of the production goes to the United States. The finest pieces are those made with white clay and those made by Quezada run considerably more. Collectors of the pottery include Sandra Day O'Connor, and Laura Bush.

== Process and final product ==
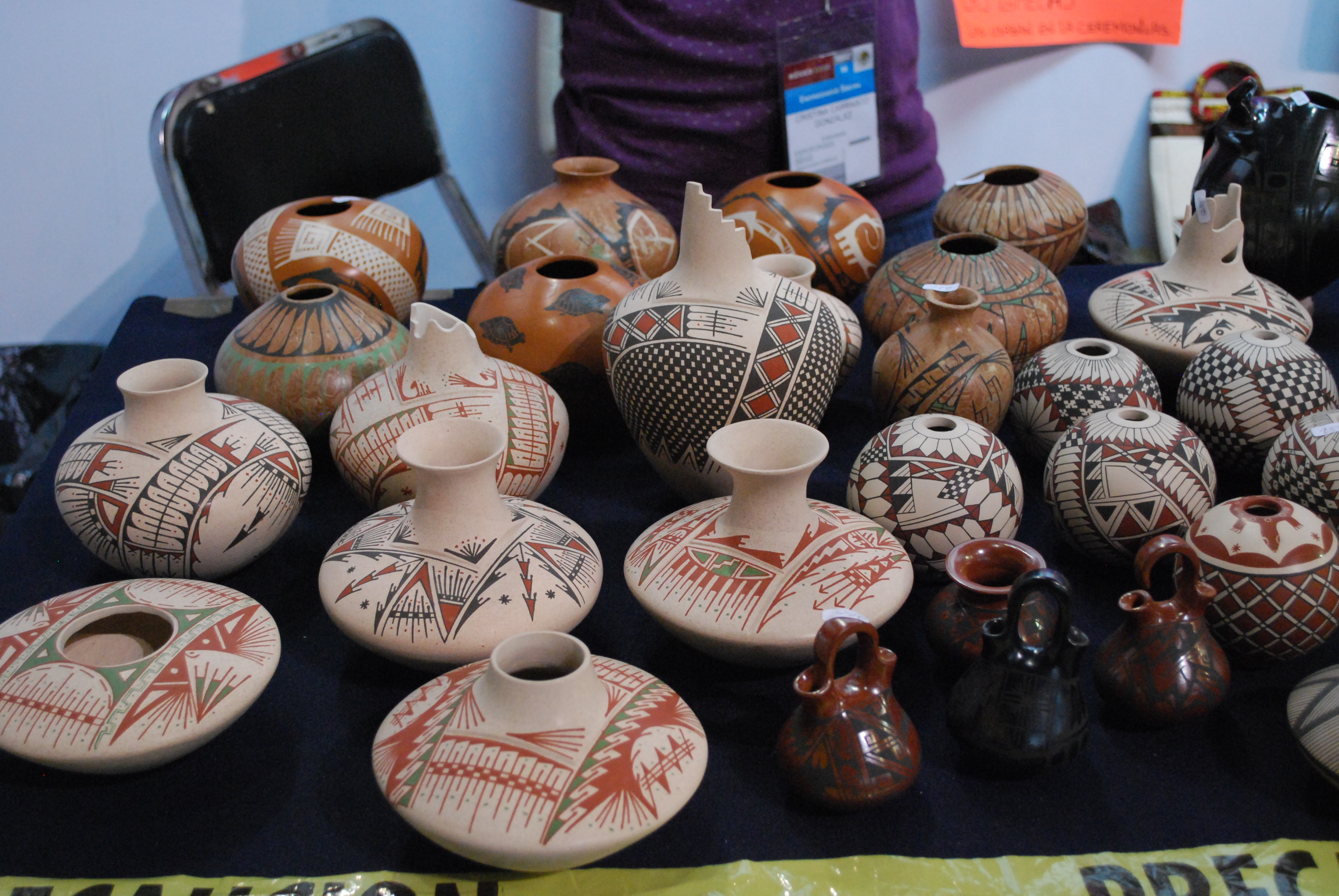
Mata Ortiz pottery at a FONART exhibition in Mexico City

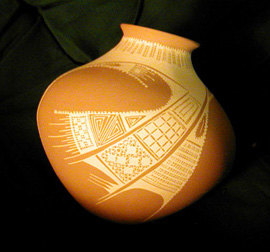
Mata Ortiz pot photographed by Richard Culatta of Ortiz Pots

Mata Ortiz potters generally work in their homes, with bedrooms often doubling as studios. The work space generally consists of just a table, with simple tools such as a hacksaw blade, a butter knife, broken spoons, sandpaper, a small stone and paintbrushes generally made from clippings of children’s hair, sometimes just four or five strands tied on a stick. The shaping of the clay is relatively faithful to the original Paquimé techniques, but each potter has their own variation in how they make their pots. However, they are generally based on Quesada’s single-coil method, using the gray, yellow, orange, red and white clays from the area just as those in Paquimé did. The paints are made from clay or from crushed minerals such as manganese, also mined locally.

The formation of the vessel is done without a potter’s wheel; instead it is a kind of wheel throwing making them essentially pinch pots. To begin, a ball of clay is pressed into a round flat shape, which is called a “tortilla.” This tortilla is pressed into a bowl to help it keep its shape as the bottom of the vessel. More clay is added as a coil which is pressed into the top edge of the tortilla, then upon itself to form the walls of the vessel as the bowl is turned, which helps keep the shape and thickness even. The walls are then scraped smooth and thin (for finer vessels) with a hacksaw blade, a process called segueteando. If there is to be a lip, an extra coil is added and integrated. Then the pot is set aside and once completely dry, it is sanded smooth using a stone or deer bone with a little vegetable oil as lubricant.

After painting, the pots are fired on open ground or in pit ovens. Two or three small pots may be fired together, but larger ones are fired individually. They are set on a pile of dried cow dung and wood and if fired on open ground, covered with a large overturned pot called a “saggar.” For polychrome pots, air is allowed to circulate inside the firing chamber. If the pots are to be turned black, the chamber is sealed to keep smoke in and air out. Lydia Quezada is credited for the black variation. She says she learned how to do it when she accidentally sealed the chamber for a polychrome pot, creating black clouds. The effect prompted her to experiment.

Mata Ortiz pottery pieces are made for their aesthetic value and use pre Hispanic pottery only as inspiration, not as a means of continuing a folk-art tradition. The painted designed is where the artistic variation is most evident and skill levels vary greatly. Some potters stick to geometric patterns and colors very similar to those on original Pakimé pottery with the oval shaped vessel considered “classic” . Others have develop shapes and styles using new colors such as green, yellow, even purpose, sweeping lines and extremely thin lines. Newer painted designs include zoomorphic shapes such as lizards, snakes, fish, birds and others, almost always related to the desert environment. The most common decoration is burnishing to give a soft shine and fine lines in black and ochre. Another form of decoration adds decorative elements in clay over the walls of the vessel and sgraffito is usually done with only one color such as black on black. A relatively rare form of decoration for the pottery is the incision of the clay vessel while the clay is still moist.

Emphasis is generally on quality rather than quantity, differing from pottery production in central Mexico. Most pottery that is produced is of lesser quality with thicker walls and less-artistic painting. There is a middle group that makes good quality and an elite number who can make truly artistic wares. These top artists include members of Quezada's family (Lydia, Nicolas, Noe, and Damian Quezada), the Ortiz family (Felix, Nicolas, and Macario), Taurina Baca, and Hector and Graciella Gallegos, among others. Nicolas Ortiz is best known for creating sculptural pieces. From the last category come some of the best handmade pottery in the world.
