= Colonia Juárez, Chihuahua =

Mormon colony in Mexico

Colonia Juárez
- Town
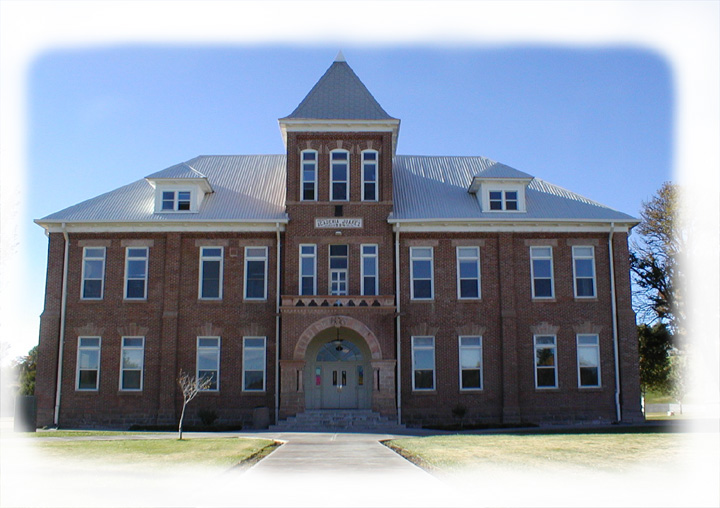
- Academia Juarez, a school owned by the Church of Jesus Christ of Latter-day Saints

- Location within Mexico
- Coordinates: 30°18′32.4″N 108°4′33.6″W
- Country: Mexico
- State: Chihuahua
- Municipality: Casas Grandes
- Established: 1886

Population (2010)
  - Total: 1,035

Colonia Juárez is a small town in the northwestern part of the Mexican state of Chihuahua. Colonia Juárez is located in the valley of the Piedras Verdes River on the western edge of the Chihuahuan Desert and beneath the eastern front of the Sierra Madre Occidental. It is roughly 9 miles (14 km) north of Mata Ortiz and 12 miles (19 km) southwest of Nuevo Casas Grandes. The town had a population of 1,035 in 2010.

Established in 1886, the colony was named for the Mexican national hero Benito Juárez. The colony was one of many colonies in Mexico settled by Mormon pioneers, or members of the Church of Jesus Christ of Latter-day Saints (LDS Church). This colonization was part of the church's larger campaign to establish the State of Deseret while evading the anti-polygamy Edmunds Act of 1882. Although the town was planned before the end of polygamy, much of its growth in the late 19th century was due to Mormon immigrants leaving Utah and other parts of the U.S. due to their practice of polygamy. In addition, Mormon colonies outside of the U.S. proved financially important to the LDS Church during this time when the U.S. Federal government had confiscated much of the church's holdings. There are many descendants of these colonies that have attained prominence in both countries, including Mitt Romney. In addition, many church leaders have roots in these colonies.

By the beginning of the 20th century, Chihuahua and other Mexican states were home to hundreds of thousands of Mormons and were almost a majority of the state of Sonora. The Mexican Revolution resulted in the exodus of many colonists from the region; some left permanently while others returned after a few years. Many families of all backgrounds sent women and children to the United States or Europe during the Revolution; others left completely. One of the last battles of the final phase of the Revolution was fought just outside Casas Grandes; several colonists participated in rescuing the wounded and caring for them at the old hacienda known in the histories as "El Refugio," earning the gratitude of the Revolutionary Government.

Many of the colonies survived for several generations after the Revolution. The mountain colonies, such as Pacheco, García, and Chuichupa, slowly lost the colonist population due mainly to economic pressures, so that by the 1960s most Mormon colonists lived either in Colonia Juárez or Colonia Dublán, where to this day a sizable part of the population descend from the original colonists.

Colonia Juárez is known for its peach and apple orchards as well as cattle ranches. It is also known for the many graduates from its renowned academy. Residents typically work as farmers, ranchers or in the local schools.

Colonia Juárez is the home of the Academia Juárez (Juarez Stake Academy), a private high school owned by the LDS Church.

Colonia Juárez is home to one of the LDS Church's temples. It was dedicated on March 6, 1999, by church president Gordon B. Hinckley. The Colonia Juárez Chihuahua Mexico Temple was one of the first of the smaller, standardized temples the LDS Church began constructing in the late 1990s, and is currently the smallest temple it operates.

== Notable people from the colony ==
- Joseph T. Bentley
- Carl F. Eyring
- Greer Skousen
- Henry Eyring (chemist)
- Henry Eyring (Mormon pioneer)
- Franklin S. Harris
- John Hatch (basketball, born 1947)
- Jorge A. Rojas
- Marion G. Romney
- William R. R. Stowell
- O. Meredith Wilson
