= Nuevo Casas Grandes Municipality =

Municipality in the Mexican state of Chihuahua

Coordinates: 30°25′N 107°54′W

Nuevo Casas Grandes
- Municipality
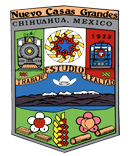
- Coat of arms

- Location in Mexico
- Country: Mexico
- State: Chihuahua
- Municipal seat: Nuevo Casas Grandes

Location of Casas Grandes Municipality in Chihuahua.

Nuevo Casas Grandes is a Mexican municipality, located in the state of Chihuahua, northwestern Mexico. The capital and seat of the municipality is the city of Nuevo Casas Grandes, which has the same name as the surrounding municipality.

As of 2010, the municipality had a total population of 59,337.

As of 2010, the city of Nuevo Casas Grandes had a population of 55,553. Other than the city of Nuevo Casas Grandes, the municipality had 158 localities, none of which had a population over 1,000.

It has only one airport and is seven hours behind the Greenwich Meridian.

As of March 2, 2021, Nuevo Casas Grandes reported 696 confirmed cases and 72 deaths from the COVID-19 pandemic in Mexico.

Yuriel Armando González Lara (PRI), candidate for municipal president, was assassinated on March 4, 2021.
