= John Hatch (basketball, born 1947) =

Mexican basketball player (born 1947)

John Hatch (born 4 January 1947 in Colonia Juárez, Chihuahua) is a Mexican former basketball player who competed in the 1968 Summer Olympics. He is the nephew of Gayle Bluth, who represented Mexico at the 1960 Summer Olympics in basketball.
