= Charles C. Di Peso =

American archaeologist

Charles Corradino Di Peso (October 20, 1920, in St. Louis, Missouri, U.S. – November 20, 1982, in Tucson, Arizona) was an American archaeologist. He is known for his research in Northern Mexico and the American Southwest.

== Biography ==
Di Peso's first field experience was at Ackmen, Colorado in 1937. In 1941 Di Peso returned to the field to conduct work in New Mexico. Both of these were headed by the Field Museum in Chicago. Di Peso earned a B.A in anthropology and a B.S. in geology from Beloit College in 1942.

After graduation Di Peso joined the U.S. Air Force and was a pilot during World War II and was discharged in 1946. During his time in the Air Force Di Peso was stationed in Phoenix, Arizona, where he lived after the war, becoming the archaeologist for the city.

In 1947 Di Peso received a B.F.T. from the American Institute of Foreign Trade. He received his M.A. from the University of Arizona in 1950 and earned his PhD from there in 1953 becoming the first student at that institution to earn that degree in anthropology. There, he was a student of the famous Southwest archaeologist Emil Haury who influenced him greatly throughout his career.

Di Peso first worked for the Amerind Foundation in 1948 and in 1954 became the director which he held until his death in 1982. Di Peso is best known for his excavation, analysis, and interpretation of archaeological materials from Paquimé, also known as Casas Grandes, beginning in 1959. According to Di Peso, Paquimé was established by Mesoamerican merchants in order to control trade between Mesoamerica and the Southwest. While this assertion continues to be controversial, Di Peso's work at Paquimé had the effect of drawing archaeologists' attention to a long-ignored part of North America.

== Writings ==
- Di Peso, Charles C., 1974, Casas Grandes: A Fallen Trading Center of the Gran Chichimeca (Vols. 1–3). Amerind Foundation Publication No. 9. Northland Press, Flagstaff, Arizona.
- Di Peso, Charles C., John B. Rinaldo, and Gloria J. Fenner, 1974, Casas Grandes: A Fallen Trading Center of the Gran Chichimeca (Vols. 4–8). Amerind Foundation Publication No. 9. Northland Press, Flagstaff, Arizona.
