= Casas Grandes, Chihuahua =

Town in the Mexican state of Chihuahua

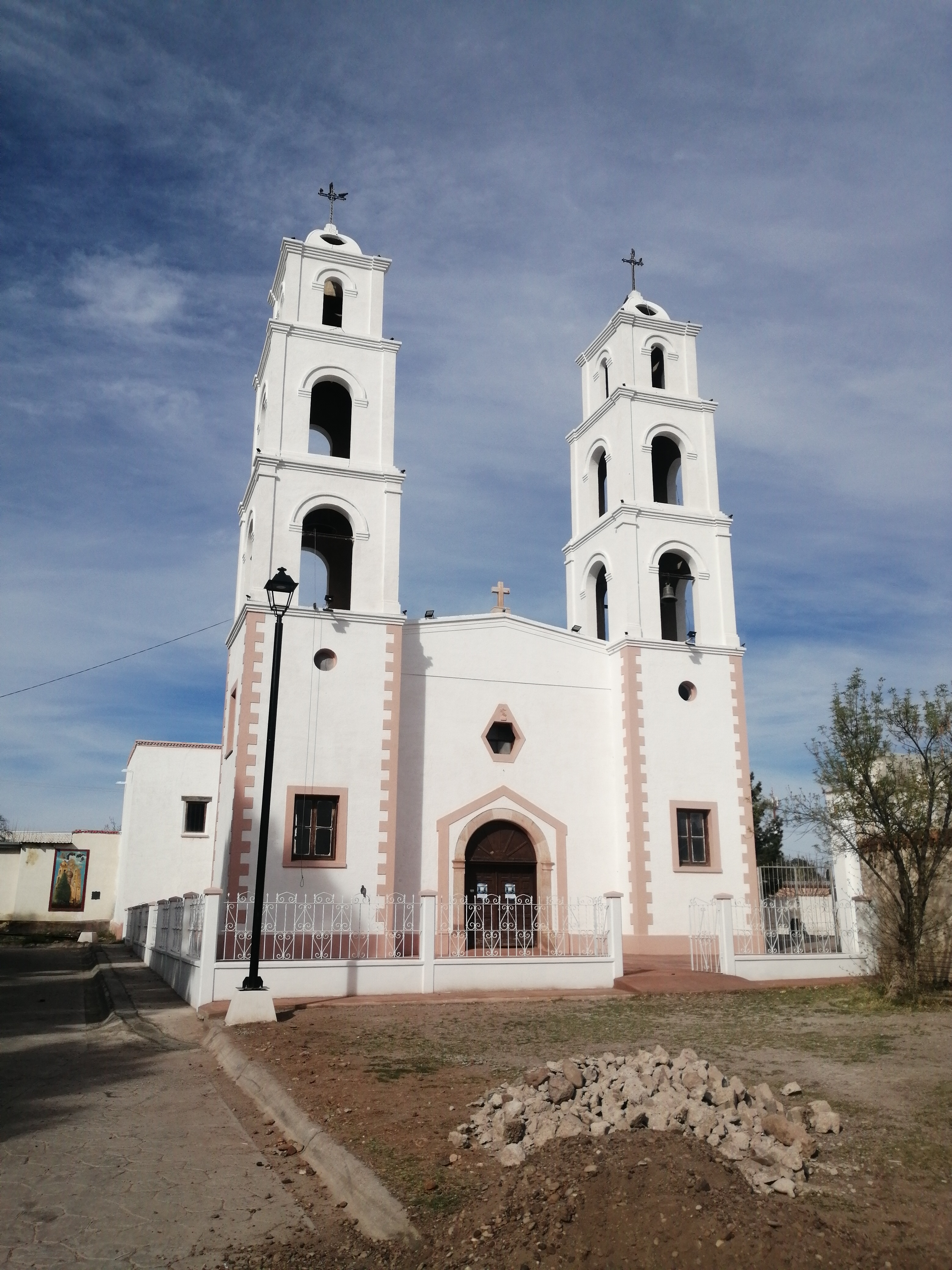
San Antonio de Padua church at the downtown.

Casas Grandes is a town located in the northern Mexican state of Chihuahua. It serves as the municipal seat of government for the surrounding Casas Grandes Municipality of the same name.

As of 2010, the town of Casas Grandes had a population of 5,256.
