= Mata Ortiz =

Village in the state of Chihuahua, Mexico

- Village
- Location within Mexico
- Coordinates: 30.179°N 108.021°W
- Country: Mexico
- State: Chihuahua
- Municipio libre (municipality): Casas Grandes

Population (2010)
  - Total: 1,182

Mata Ortiz is a small village in the state of Chihuahua, Mexico, less than 100 miles (160 km) from the US-Mexico border. The community is one of the designated localidades (localities) in the municipio libre (municipality) of Casas Grandes, one of several such pueblos in a wide, fertile valley long inhabited by indigenous people. Mata Ortiz is located at the base of a mountain known as El Indio and on the west bank of the Rio Palanganas, a tributary of the Rio Casas Grandes. The ancient ruins of Casas Grandes are located nearby. As of 2010, Mata Ortiz had a population of 1,182.

== History ==
The town was originally established as “Pearson” during the Porfirio Díaz presidency in the late 19th century with its economy based on agriculture, timber, cattle and the nearby railroad. After the Mexican Revolution the town’s name was changed, to honor Juan Mata Ortiz, a local hero who fought against the Apaches in the 19th century. After the Revolution was in influx of people and land was redistributed under the ejido system, but many residents still relied on seasonal labor and work with the railroad to get by. Rail work ended in the 1960s when the repair yard was relocated to Nuevo Casas Grandes, leading to the town’s decline, which continued until the 1980s.

== Ceramics ==
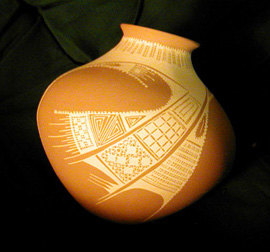
Mata Ortiz olla

The making of pottery in the town began in the 1980s, and now about 300 of the 2,000 inhabitants in the town make a living from making ceramics, with about two-thirds of the population having employment indirectly related to the craft, either providing fuel for kilns or offering guest rooms to traders and tourists. The handicraft has raised living standards considerably in the municipality from the poverty of the early 1980s. Before ceramics, there was only seasonal agricultural jobs for men and for women there was nothing. Pottery has allowed residents to provide things like electricity, plumbing, vehicles and more to families. The movement to create the pottery has included women as well as men since its beginning, and today women of all talent and expertise levels are found in the town.

The town is known for its ceramics which are a revival of the Paquimé tradition, conserving much of its style, decoration and color. The air is often filled with gray tendrils of smoke from the many kilns. The town has hosted a ceramics competition called the Concurso de Cerámica since 2008, now supported by FONART, and is a major handcrafts event in Mexico. Other support for artisans comes from other federal and state agency for supplies and training.

Mata Ortiz has recently seen a revival of an recontact Oasisamerica pottery tradition. Inspired by pottery from the ancient city of Paquimé, which traded as far north as New Mexico and Arizona and throughout northern Mexico, contemporary potters are producing work for national and international sale. This new artistic movement is due to the efforts of Juan Quezada Celado, the self-taught originator of modern Mata Ortiz pottery, his extended family and neighbors.

== Books ==
- Bezy, John V., & Scott, Stuart D. The Artistry and History of Mata Ortiz. ISBN 978-1-4507-2067-0
- Cahill, Rick. The Story of Casas Grandes Pottery. Bodjum Books, 1991, ISBN 0-9630853-0-1
- Lowell, Hills, Quintana, et al., The Many Faces of Mata Ortiz, Rio Nuevo Publishers, Tucson, AZ, 1999; ISBN 1-887896-08-2 - an overview of many of the Mata Ortiz potters and their individual styles.
- Parks, Walter, The Miracle of Mata Ortiz, The Courier Press, Riverside, CA, 1994; ISBN 0-9637655-0-7 - outlining the history of Mata Ortiz pottery.
