= Voluntary society =

Libertarian conception of a society entirely of private/cooperative ownership

A voluntary society, voluntary community or voluntary city is a term used in right-libertarianism to describe an entity in which all property (including streets, parks, etc.) and all services (including courts, police, etc.) are provided through what the proponents of the term call "voluntary means" and in which they include private or cooperative ownership.

In a "voluntary society", as described by David Beito, Peter Gordon and Alexander Tabarrok, the notion of something being "privately" or "cooperatively" owned would be "radically different" from "monopolistic privatization with state subsidies", or "monopolistic control of public resources by the state", respectively. Instead, courts might be replaced with dispute resolution organizations; police with volunteer-based community defense organizations or private security agencies and crime insurers; transportation authorities with community road associations and rail counterparts; etc. These services were the subject of the book, The Voluntary City, which dealt with them chapter-by-chapter.

Anarcho-capitalists view "voluntary societies" as the solution to the conflict between those who favor government allowing behaviors and arrangements such as non-violent drug use, free stores, sexual liberation, voluntary communal sharing, etc., and those who favor government restrictions on such activities. Those who want to live under a certain code of conduct can move to a community that supports and protects it. Anarcho-capitalists such as Stefan Molyneux believe that in a "voluntary society", dispute resolution organizations and pollution insurance companies would prevent problems such as pollution.

== See also ==
- Seasteading
- Voluntaryism
