= Casas Grandes =

Prehistoric archaeological site in Mexico

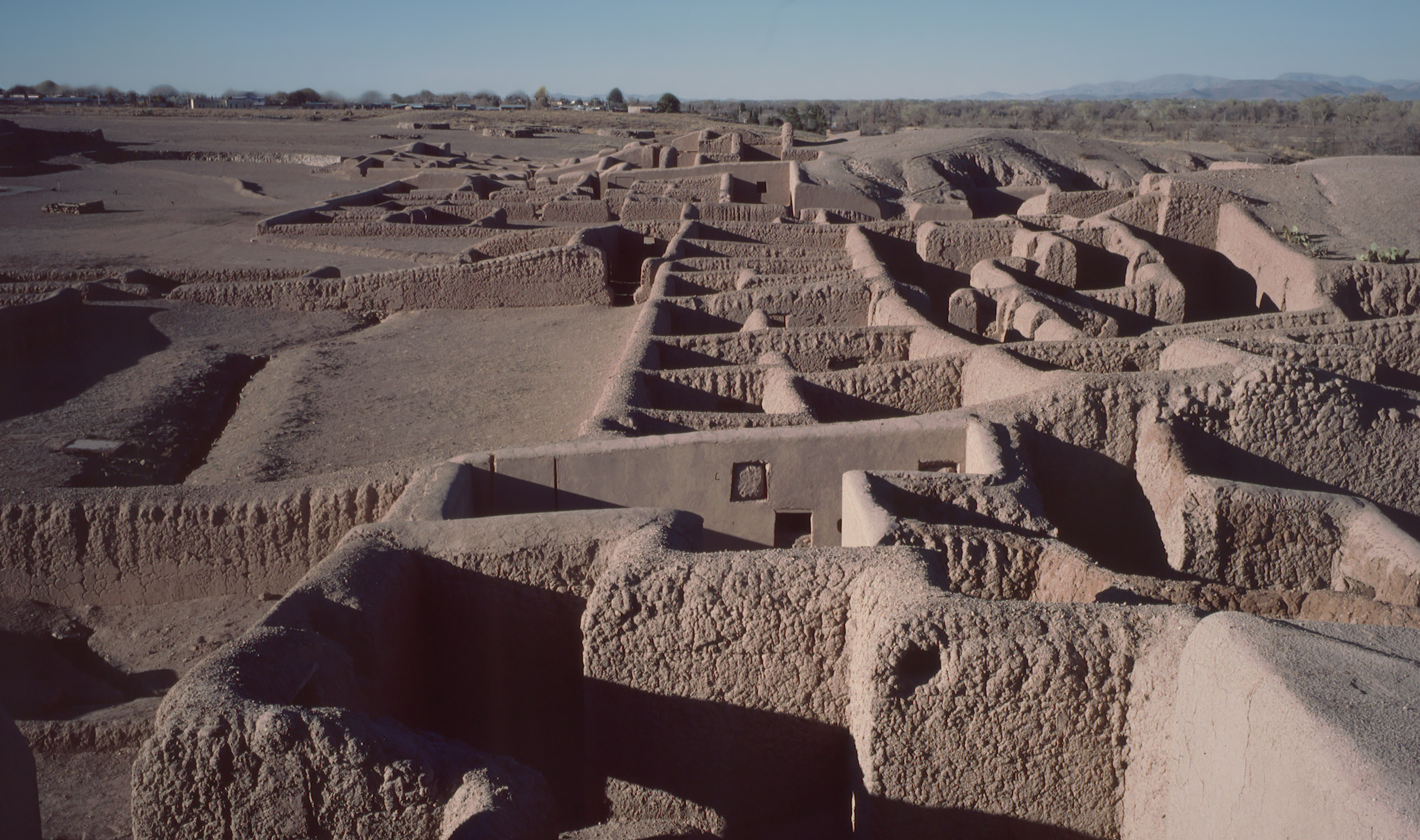
- View of a section in Paquimé, Casas Grandes

- Location within Mexico
- 30°21′59″N 107°56′51″W
- Location: Chihuahua, Mexico

History
- Built: 1130 CE
- Rebuilt: 1350 CE

UNESCO World Heritage Site
- Official name: Archaeological Zone of Paquimé, Casas Grandes
- Type: Cultural
- Criteria: iii, iv
- Designated: 1998 (22nd session)
- Reference no.: 560rev
- Region: Latin America and the Caribbean

Casas Grandes (Spanish for Great Houses; also known as Paquimé) is a prehistoric archaeological site in the northern Mexican state of Chihuahua. Construction of the site is attributed to the Mogollon culture. Casas Grandes has been designated a UNESCO World Heritage Site under the purview of INAH and a "Pueblo Mágico" since 2015.

Casas Grandes is one of the largest and most complex Mogollon culture sites in the region. Settlement began after 1130 AD, and the larger buildings developed into multi-storied dwellings after 1350 AD. The community was abandoned approximately in 1450 AD. Casas Grandes is regarded as one of the most significant Mogollon archaeological zones in the northwestern Mexico region, linking it to other sites in Arizona and New Mexico in the United States, and demonstrating the extent of the Mogollon sphere of influence.

The Casas Grandes complex is situated in a broad, fertile valley along the Casas Grandes or San Miguel River, approximately 56 kilometres (35 mi) south of Janos and 240 kilometres (150 mi) northwest of the state capital, Chihuahua. The settlement depended on irrigation to sustain its agricultural activities.

The archaeological zone is contained within the eponymous modern municipio (municipality) of Casas Grandes. The valley and region have been inhabited by aboriginal groups for millennia.

== Pre-Columbian culture ==
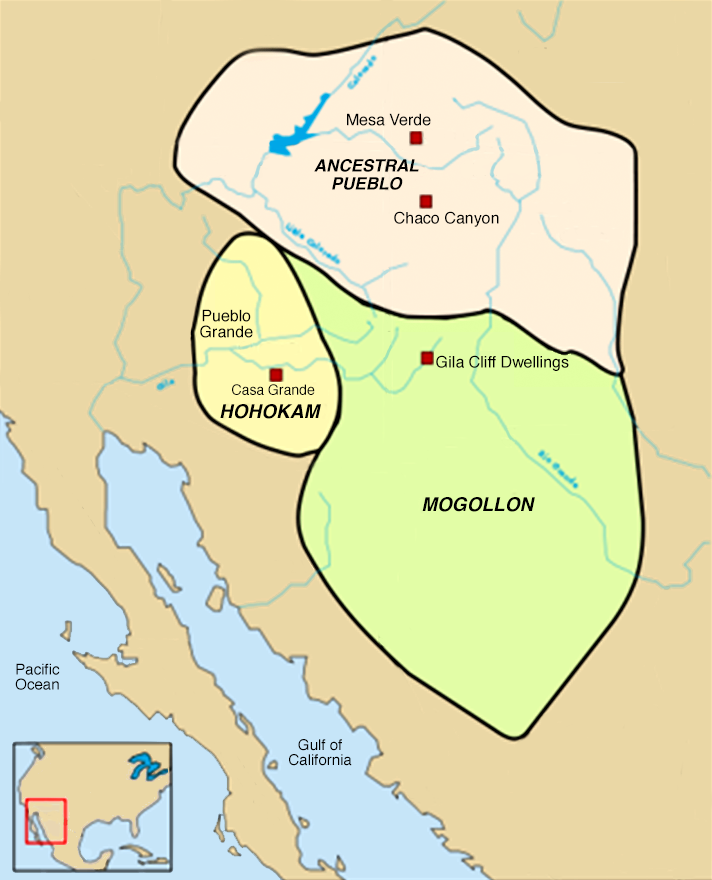
Map of major prehistoric archaeological cultures

Between 1130 and 1300 AD, the area's inhabitants started gathering in small settlements within this expansive fertile valley. The most extensive identified settlement is now recognized as Paquimé or Casas Grandes. It originated as a collection of 20 or more clusters of houses, each with a plaza and enclosing wall. These single-story adobe dwellings shared a unified water system. Evidence indicates that Paquimé possessed an intricate water management system comprising underground drain networks, reservoirs, channels for water distribution to the residences, and a sewage system.

After being burned about 1340, Casas Grandes was rebuilt with multi-story apartment buildings to replace the small buildings. Casas Grandes consisted of about 2,000 adjoining rooms built of adobe, I-shaped Mesoamerican ballcourts, stone-faced platforms, effigy mounds, and a market area. About 350 other, smaller settlement sites have been found in the Casas Grandes area, some as far as 70 kilometres (43 mi) away. Archaeologists believe that the area directly controlled by Casas Grandes was relatively small, extending out about 30 kilometres (19 mi) from the city. The population may have been about 2,500 in Casas Grandes with perhaps 10,000 people living within its area of control.

Specialized craft activities included the production of copper bells and ornaments, extensive pottery, and beads from marine molluscs. These crafts were probably distributed by an extensive trading network. Casas Grandes pottery has a white or reddish surface, with ornamentation in blue, red, brown, or black. In the past it was sometimes considered to be of better manufacture than the contemporary pottery in the area. Effigy bowls and vessels were often formed in the shape of a painted human figure. Casas Grandes pottery was traded among prehistoric peoples as far north as present-day New Mexico and Arizona and throughout northern Mexico.

The archaeologist Stephen Lekson has noted that Paquimé is aligned on roughly the same longitudinal axis as Chaco Canyon and Aztec Ruins, with an error of only a few kilometres/miles. Chaco reached its cultural peak first, then Aztec and Paquimé. The similarities among these sites may indicate that their ruling elites also had a ceremonial connection. Lekson proposed that ruling elites, once removed from their prior positions at Chaco, re-established their hegemony over the area at Aztec and later Paquime. This idea, though, remains controversial and is not as widely accepted as often reported (cf. Lekson 2009). It has been proposed, and more widely accepted, that the origins of Paquime can be found in its connection with the Mogollon culture.

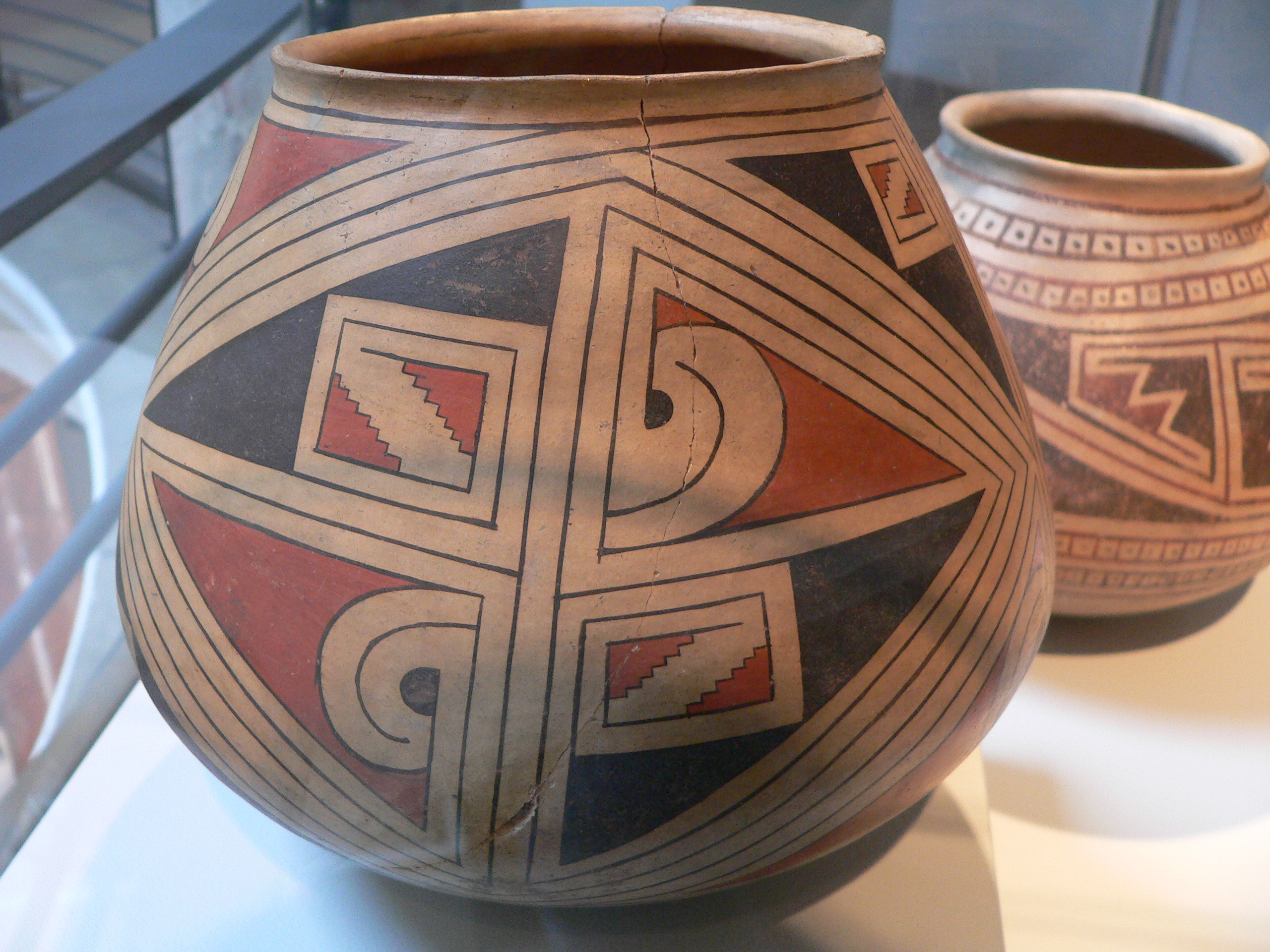
Ramos Polychrome olla with macaw symbols

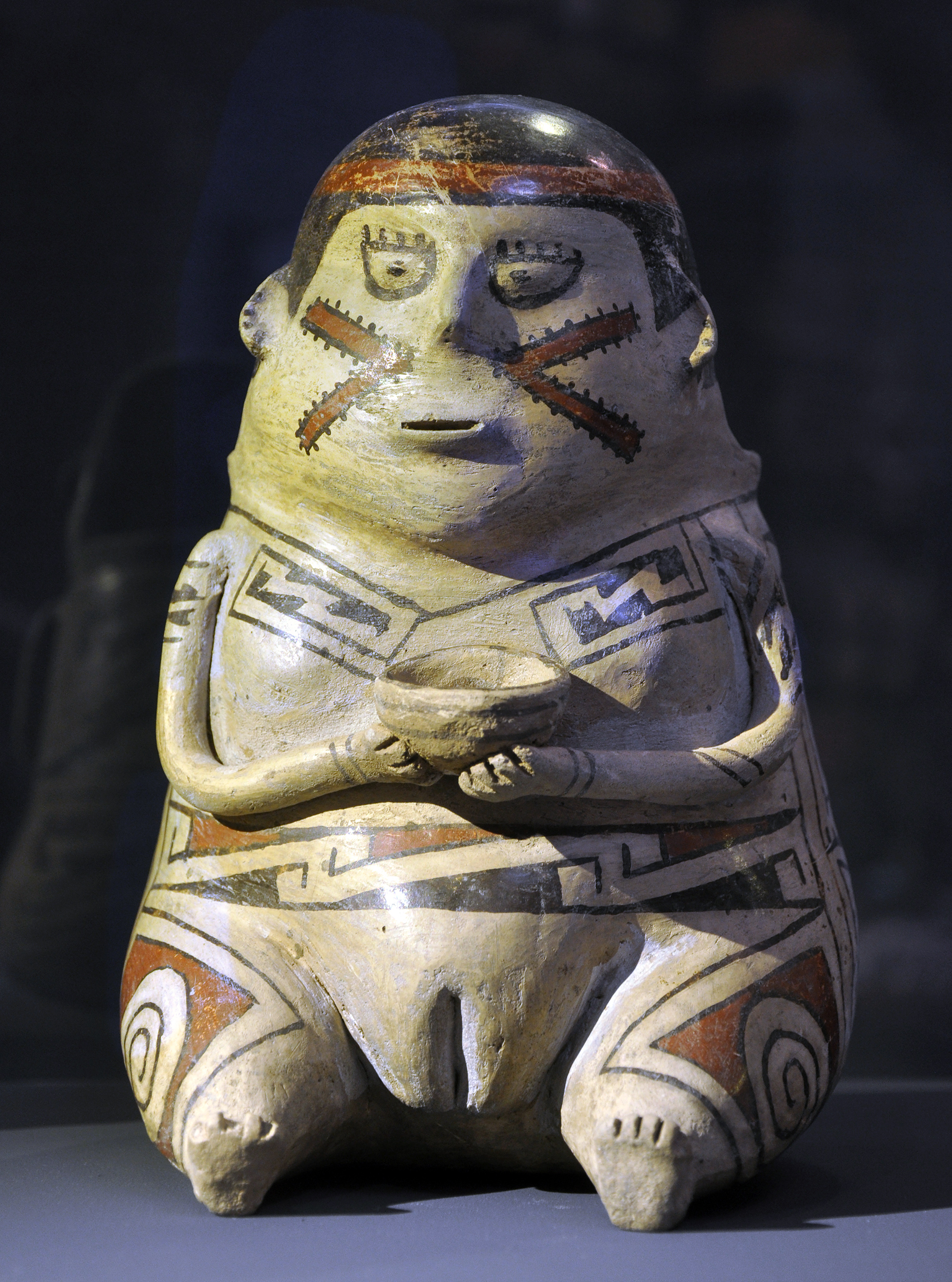
Woman with a bowl, Ramos effigy

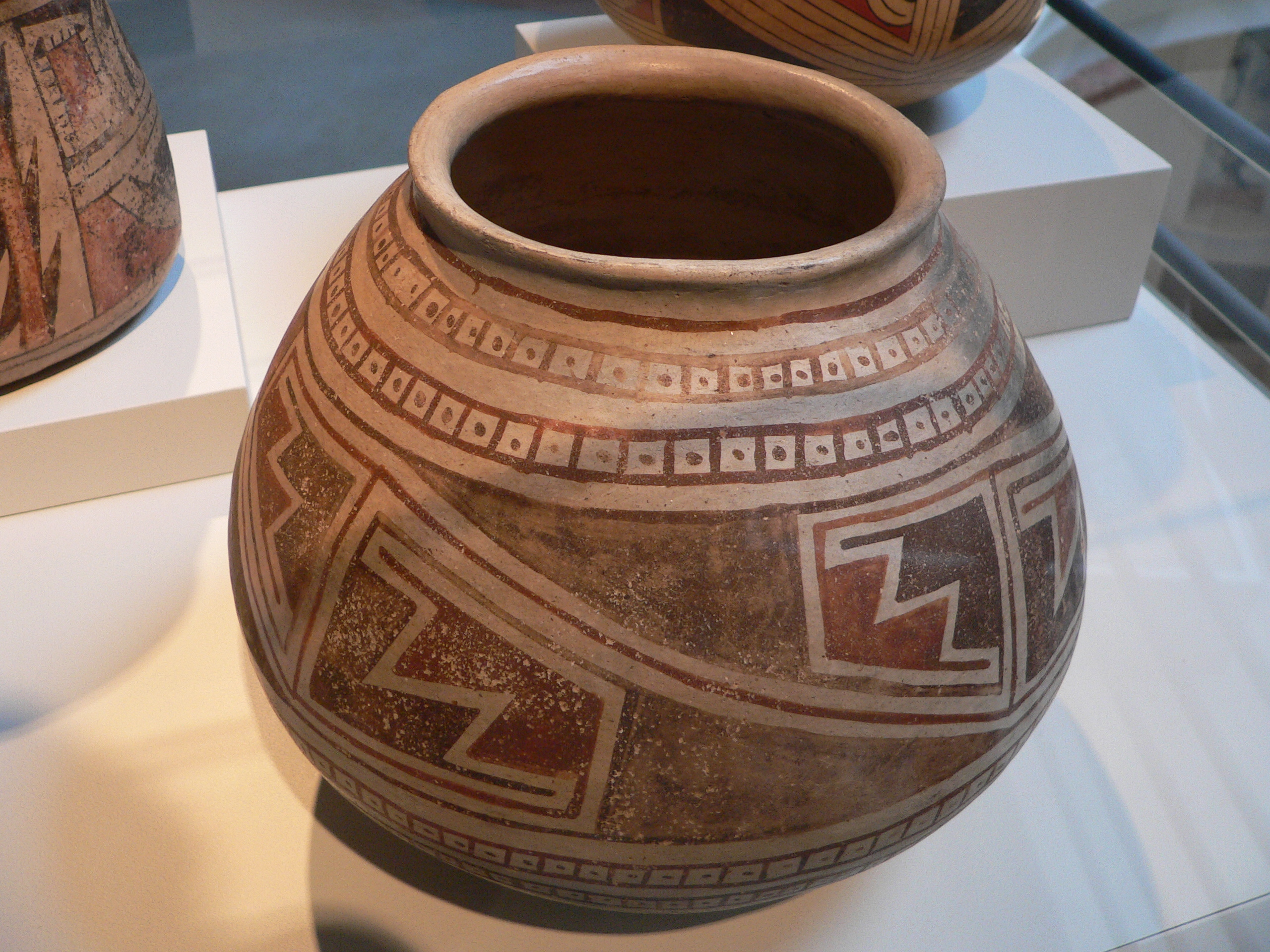
Ramos Polychrome olla with Southwestern designs

== Archaeological ruins ==
At the time of the Spanish Conquest, the district of Casas Grandes was studded with artificial mounds, from which looters took numerous stone axes, metates or corn-grinders, and earthenware pottery vessels of various kinds.

Before significant archaeological investigation, sizable portions of buildings from pre-Columbian times were extant about 800 metres from the modern community. The ruins were built of sun-dried blocks of mud and gravel, about 56 centimetres (22 in) thick, and of irregular length, generally about 1 metre (3 ft), probably formed and dried in place. The thick walls seem to have been plastered both inside and outside. A principal structure extended 240 metres (800 ft) from north to south, and 76 metres (250 ft) east to west. It was generally rectangular, and appears to have consisted of three separate units joined by galleries or lines of lower buildings.

The eastern and western halves of the city are divided by a stone wall and reservoirs. The monuments on the east are rectilinear, puddled adobe structures used primarily for domestic and manufacturing purposes. The buildings on the west, on the other hand, are open earth mounds lined in stone for public displays. This visual structure defines the eastern side as lending toward the Puebloan peoples of North America and the west as referencing the cultures to the south in Mesoamerica. This visual motif is prevalent throughout the other sites sharing the same longitudinal line, indicating that they were built by a common group.

The homes at Paquimé were circular and semi-circular pit houses and coursed-adobe room blocks built around plazas. The living spaces varied in size from closet-sized to extensive courtyards. Walls at many of the angles stand 12 to 15 metres (40 to 50 ft) high, and indicate an original elevation of up to six or seven stories. Ruins about 140 metres (450 ft) from the main grouping consist of a series of rooms ranged round a square court, seven rooms to each side with a larger apartment at each corner.

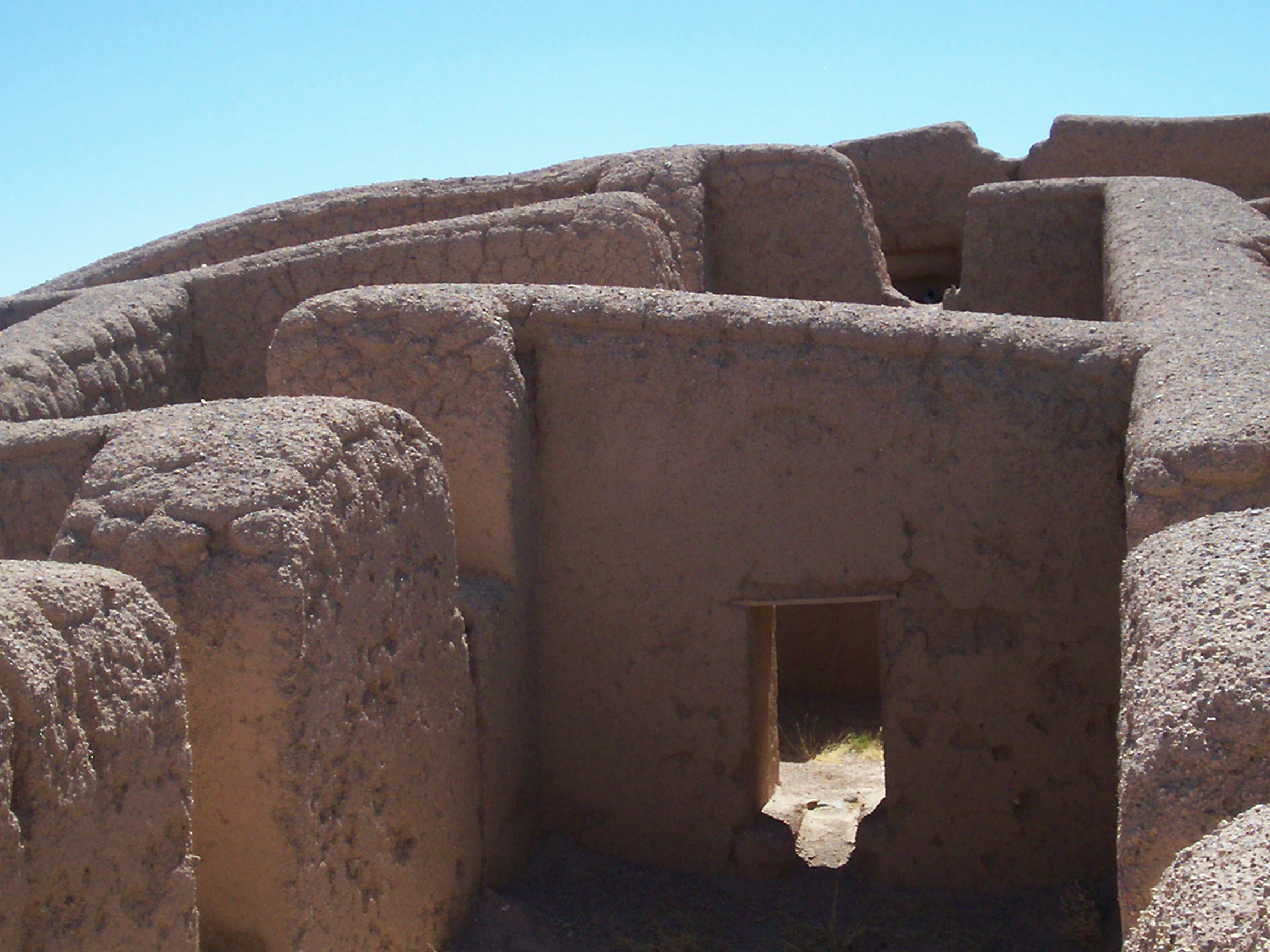
T-shaped doorway at Paquimé

The settlement featured T-shaped doorways and stone disks at the bottom of ceiling support columns, both distinctive of Puebloan architecture. Casas Grandes had ballcourts, though they were relatively small compared to other major sites. The ballcourts at Paquime are in the classic "I" shape of those found Mesoamerica, and not the oval-shaped ones found in association with the Hohokam culture in south and central Arizona.

A 2,300-kilogram (5,000 lb) iron meteorite was found in one of the rooms, carefully wrapped in linen. The meteorite is displayed in the Janet Annenberg Hooker Hall of Geology, Gems and Minerals at the Smithsonian Museum of Natural History.

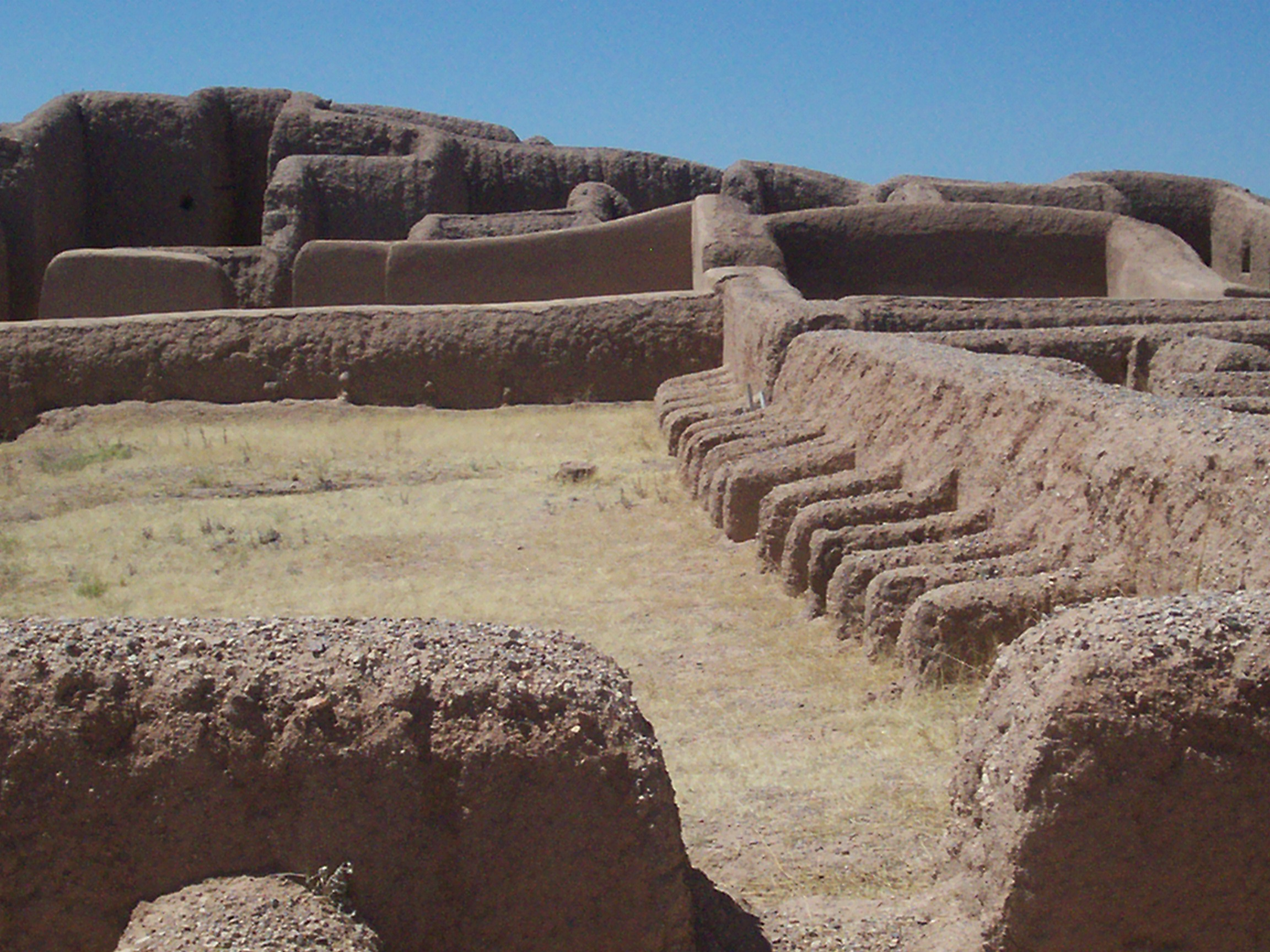
Macaw Pens at Paquimé

Excavations in one compound produced eggshell fragments, bird skeletons, and traces of wooden perches. Additionally, there is the presence of a row of macaw pens in the center of the site. Archaeologists concluded that the community had imported an initial population of scarlet macaws from Mesoamerica and raised them as their feathers were considered sacred and important in Mesoamerican rituals.

A major collection of Casas Grandes pottery is currently held by the Museum of Peoples and Cultures at Brigham Young University in Provo, Utah. Stanford University in California also holds pottery artifacts from the site. A group of 23 pottery vessels from the site was acquired by the British Museum in 1979. A new permanent exhibit, Without Borders: The Deep History of Paquimé, has also recently opened at the Amerind Museum. The remainder of the material culture recovered from Paquime is located in the care of INAH in Casas Grandes, Chihuahua and Chihuahua City, Chihuahua.

Casas Grandes' ruins are similar to neighboring ruins near Gila and Salinas in New Mexico, as well as Arizona and Colorado. It is reasoned they represent cultural groups related and linked to the Mogollon culture. Early ethnologist Hubert Howe Bancroft, in his The Native Races of the Pacific States of North America (1874), had alleged that they are related to the modern-day Hopi People, referred as "Moqui" during his period. Contemporary scholars have not precisely identified the descendants of the Casas Grandes people.

== Iconography ==
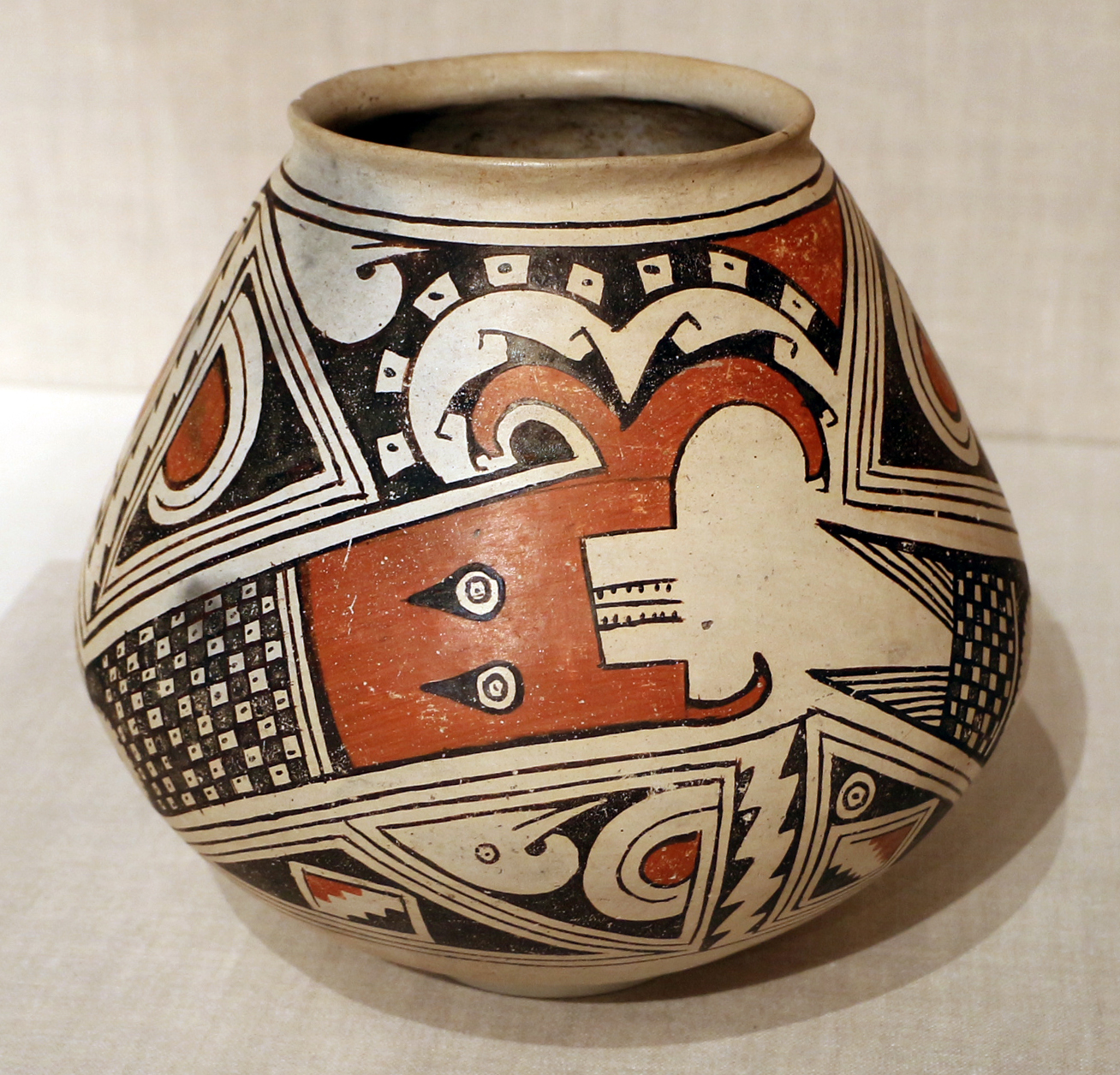
The Horned Serpent design is a common theme on pottery from Casas Grandes

Iconography can be simply defined as pictorial or material relating to or illustrating a subject, the traditional or conventional images or symbols associated with a subject and especially a religious or legendary subject, including art. In the case with the ruins found at Casas Grandes, iconography has proven to be particularly important in understanding gender differences, especially in regards to trade, daily tasks, and religious rituals. Effigies (small figurines) were found through excavation of the site, thus the effigies show definite gender and sex differences between males and females in society. The similar characteristics of the effigies such as body positions, body proportions, activities, and facial decorations allow archaeologist to make assumptions of how gender differences were portrayed. Artisans of Casas Grandes depicted a wide range of behaviors and beliefs from rules about social behavior (sitting positions) to ritual activities (smoking) and the supernatural (horned/plumed serpents). Based on archaeologists' studies of the effigies found, the activities of women and men were both valued, and social differentiation was based more on individual status and class membership than sex and gender. Contrasting specific pictorial representations of the effigies include masculine identified features and activities such as sitting with their legs flexed to their bodies, decorated with pound signs and horned serpent imagery, smoking, and their penis. Females in contrast have large midsections sitting with their legs extended, decorated with modified pound signs and bird imagery, holding children and pots, and occasionally nursing. The effigies depicted the way in which the Casas Grandes people thought social life should be implemented based on gender differences and provide insight on the simple aspects of society.

== Birth and death of Casas Grandes ==
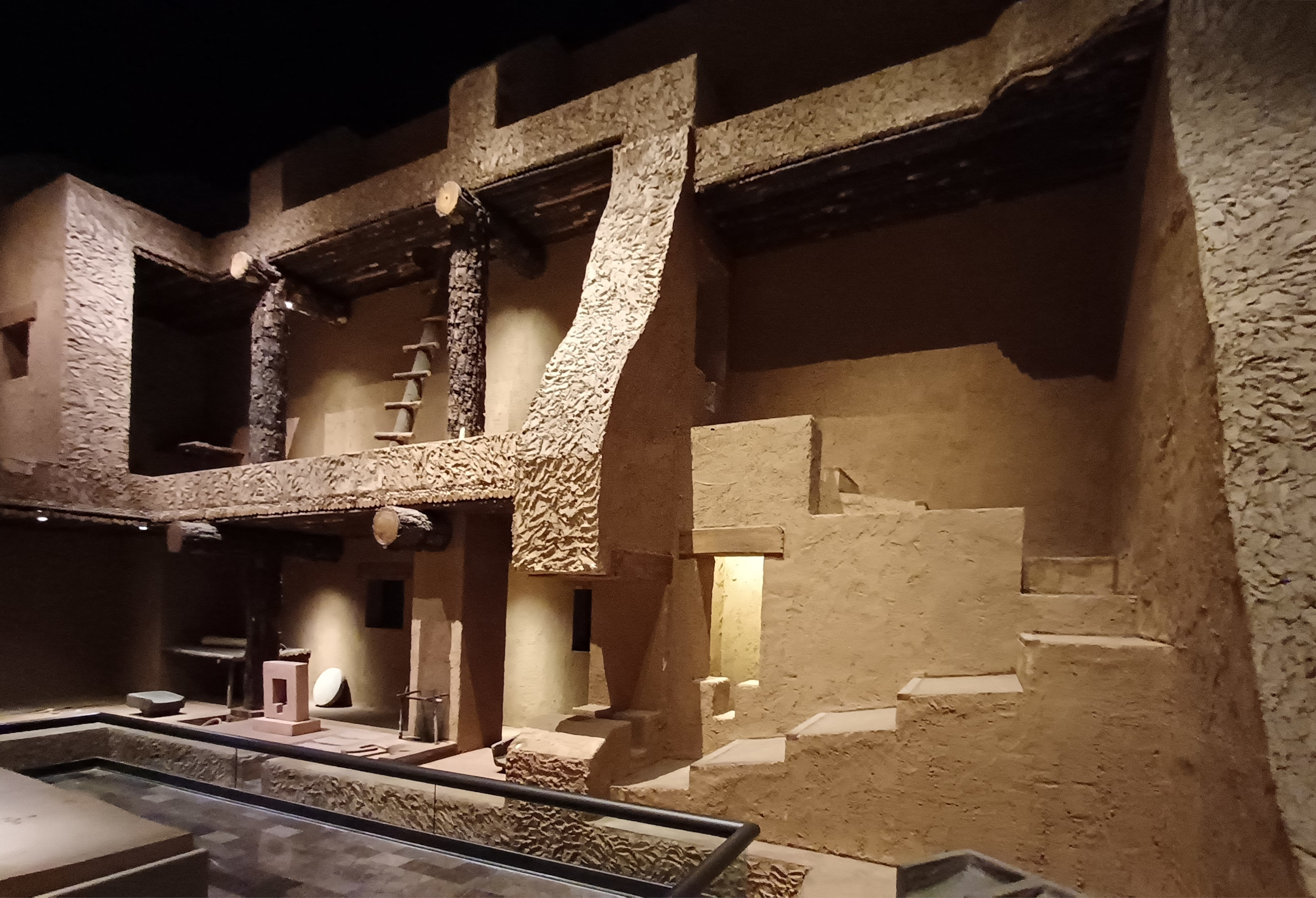
Cross section model of a Paquime building at the Museo Nacional de Antropología

Various theories exist as to the inhabitants of Casas Grandes, but the most logical relationship of Casas Grandes to Forty Houses 97 kilometres (60 mi) to the south and to TJ Ruins and Gila Cliff 320 kilometres (200 mi) to the north led to the common agreement that the site is part of the Mogollon culture sphere of influence.

Three other theories compete to explain its existence. The archaeologist Charles C. Di Peso advanced the theory that Casas Grandes was a backwater until about 1200 CE when pochteca (traders) from the Aztec empire or other Mesoamerican states to the south turned it into a major trading center. A diametrically opposed theory is that Casas Grandes was established by the elites of the Ancestral Puebloans from the north who were leaving Chaco Canyon and other areas during their decline. The third theory is that Casas Grandes is purely a local creation, a community that grew over time to dominate its region and adopted some religious and social customs from the civilizations of Mesoamerica. There is common academic agreement that trading existed between the cultures of Mesoamerica, Aridoamerica, and the American southwest, though not on a large or planned scale. As no system like the pochteca existed in the north, the architectural remains throughout yet share a commonality of knowledge from north to south, that included such ancient population centers such as at Snaketown.

Casas Grandes was abandoned in about 1450. It is unclear whether it was abandoned slowly over a period of years or quickly. The Spanish explorer Francisco de Ibarra found the site of Casa Grandes in 1565. The Indians nearby, non-agricultural nomads, probably Suma or Jano, told him that a war with village dwellers, the Opata, four days journey west had caused the abandonment of Casas Grandes and that the inhabitants had moved six days journey north. This story suggests the people of Casas Grandes joined the Pueblos on the Rio Grande in New Mexico.

Other theories are that the Casas Grandes people migrated west to Sonora and joined or became the Opata whom the Spaniards found in the mid 16th century living in "statelets," small but well-organized city states. It is also possible that Casas Grandes was abandoned because opportunities were greater elsewhere. Other communities in the Southwest are known to have been abandoned in favor of a new home.

The language spoken by the inhabitants of Casas Grandes is unknown. Given the Mesoamerican influence on Casas Grandes, Nahuatl was probably widely spoken, but it was not the primary language of the people.

== See also ==
- Colonia Dublán
- Cuarenta Casas
- Cueva de la Olla
- Gila Cliff Dwellings National Monument
- Mata Ortiz pottery
- Mogollon culture
- Nuevo Casas Grandes
- Oasisamerica
- Pre-Columbian cultural divisions of northern Mexico and southwestern United States
