= Agricol Lozano =

Mexican poet, historian, and human rights lawyer

Agrícol Lozano Herrera (1927–1999) was a poet, historian, and leader of the Church of Jesus Christ of Latter-day Saints in Mexico. He was also an outspoken human rights lawyer once imprisoned by the Mexican government.

== Biography ==
Lozano was born to Mormon parents in Tula, Hidalgo as the eldest of 13 children. His mother had been an employee of Rafael Monroy, who was slain during the Mexican Revolution of 1910 in large part because of his belief in Mormonism. Lozano's father, also named Agricol, joined the Church of Jesus Christ of Latter-day Saints (LDS Church) after learning about Mormonism from his wife.

As a child, Lozano often helped his father in the brick-laying business. He went to Mexico City to become a professional soccer player but never made the team, and instead became a missionary for the LDS Church. After his mission, Lozano worked as a custodian at the Museum of Anthropology and History of Mexico. It was largely because of a sermon he heard from Spencer W. Kimball while on a trip to the Mesa Arizona Temple in the 1940s that Lozano decided to pursue a life as a lawyer and an advocate from the indigenous people of Mexico.

He married Malinche Gómez, a native of Tampico, Tamaulipas; they had six children. Lozano also received a law degree from UNAM.

Lozano served two full-time missions for the church in Mexico. He was, for many years, the Chief Counsel for the LDS Church in Mexico. He was also one of the key figures in getting the church legal recognition in the country in 1993. Lozano was the first Mexican-born Latino to serve as a stake president in Mexico. He became president of the Mexico City North Stake in 1967. Prior to this, he had served as a counselor in the first stake presidency in Mexico City. Lozano also served as president of other stakes from time to time due to rapid church growth and divisions of stakes.

Lozano served as president of the Argentina Bahía Blanca Mission. He was also a Regional Representative of the Twelve Apostles; in this capacity, he would often emphasize that the Mexicans needed to step up and take part in leading the church in Mexico. Lozano was also involved with the Church School board in Mexico. He also served as president of the México City México Temple from 1993 to 1997.

Lozano was a poet, and his poetry has been compared to that of Walt Whitman. His full-force living of the teachings of The Church of Jesus Christ of Latter-day Saints has also been likened to that of Orson Pratt and Parley P. Pratt.

Lozano is also the author of several books. His Historia del Mormonismo en México (1983) (ISBN 9687207000) is aggressive in its assertion that the Mexican people have a special place as part of the house of Israel as descendants of Lehi in the Book of Mormon. Other writings of Lozano include his short Jesús el Cristo en la Biblia (1983) and his much longer La Apostasia (1982). In 1980 he wrote Historia de la Iglesia en México, which has the same general subject as his 1983 work.

In a sermon given in Mexico in 1997, Gordon B. Hinckley spoke of Lozano as having been, among other things, an assistant, translator, guide, and friend.
