= The Church of Jesus Christ of Latter-day Saints in Mexico =

- (Logo in Spanish)

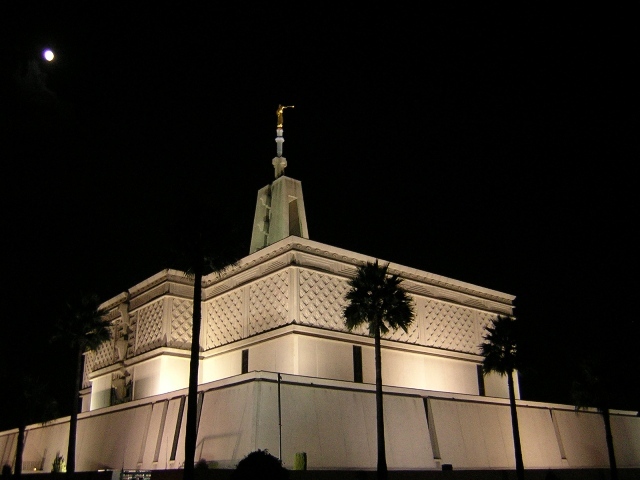
- The Mexico City Mexico Temple
- Area: Mexico
- Members: 1,572,287 (2025)
- Stakes: 231
- Districts: 42
- Wards: 1,401
- Branches: 474
- Total congregations: 1,875
- Missions: 34
- Temples: 14 operating; 3 under construction; 10 announced; 27 total
- FamilySearch Centers: 588

The Church of Jesus Christ of Latter-day Saints (LDS Church) (Spanish: La Iglesia de Jesucristo de los Santos de los Últimos Días) has had a presence in Mexico since 1874. Mexico has the third largest body of LDS Church members behind the United States and Brazil. Membership grew nearly 15% between 2011 and 2021. In the 2010 Mexican census, 314,932 individuals self-identified most closely to the LDS Church.

== History ==
Membership in Mexico
| Year | Members |
|---|---|
| 1911 | 1,000 |
| 1920 | 2,314 |
| 1930 | 4,773 |
| 1940 | 4,196 |
| 1950 | 5,915 |
| 1960 | 12,695 |
| 1970 | 67,965 |
| 1979 | 231,266 |
| 1989* | 570,000 |
| 1999 | 846,931 |
| 2009 | 1,158,236 |
| 2019 | 1,481,530 |
| 2025 | 1,572,287 |
*Membership was published as an estimate or rounded number. Source: Windall J. Ashton; Jim M. Wall, Deseret News, various years, Church Almanac Country Information: Mexico

=== Immigrating to Alta California and the Mormon Battalion ===
A map of Alta California

When the Latter-day Saint settlers arrived in the Intermountain West in 1847 and established early communities, like Salt Lake City and Bountiful, Utah, they were settling in Alta California (a federal territory of Mexico). It was during the following year that the Treaty of Guadalupe Hidalgo was signed and ratified, ending the Mexican-American War and making the territory where Latter-day Saints had settled part of the United States. The main reason that the Latter-day Saints settled in Alta California was to live in an area where they could govern themselves independently.

During the Mexican-American War, Latter-day Saints participated by enlisting the Mormon Battalion, a group of over 500 volunteers who served as a United States military unit. Their primary purposes in enlisting were to build a good relationship with the United States government (in case the U.S. won the war and gained control of the territory) and to earn some income to support their emigration. The Mormon Battalion saw no combat with Mexican troops, but did take part in a brief occupation of Tucson, guarded the Luiseño people in the aftermath of the Temecula massacre, and occupied San Diego until they were discharged. Concerns about their potential reception as a result of the Mormon Battalion's involvement in the Mexican-American War may have contributed to the decision to send missionaries, including Parley P. Pratt, to Chile in 1851 rather than to Mexico as the first proselyting efforts in Latin America.

=== Early missionary efforts ===
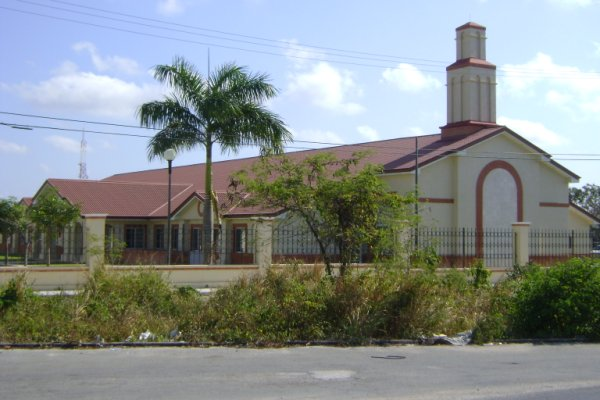
An LDS Church meetinghouse in Cancún.

The first LDS Church missionaries to Mexico were called during the late summer and early fall of 1875, shortly after Daniel W. Jones and Meliton Gonzalez Trejo had begun to translate portions of the Book of Mormon into Spanish. This initial scouting mission consisted of a handful of men who journeyed through Arizona to the Mexican state of Chihuahua, lasting ten months. These first missionaries did not perform any baptisms; church president Brigham Young had instructed them to merely observe the conditions of the country in order to determine if their preaching would be effective.

In 1876, Young sent six missionaries to Mexico and instructed them to contact and preach to the Yaqui in Northern Mexico. This group consisted of Helaman Pratt, Meliton Gonzalez Trejo, Louis Garff, George Terry, James Z. Stewart, and his brother Isaac. A few of these missionaries found success in Hermosillo, and Jose Epifanio Jesus was baptized on May 20, 1877, becoming the first official church member in Mexico. Jose Severo Rodriguez, Maria de la Cruz Pasos, Cruz Parra, and Jose Vicente Parra were all baptized a few days later on May 24.

Following the death of Brigham Young in 1877, missionary efforts in Mexico were halted, until in 1879 when missionaries were again sent to Mexico City. The first person baptized by missionaries in Mexico City was Dr. Plotino Rhodakanaty, a prominent Mexican anarchist and socialist figure. Rhodakanaty had come across a Mormon doctrinal tract in 1875 which so impressed him that he wrote a letter to the First Presidency, requesting that additional materials and missionaries be sent to him in Mexico City. By the end of 1879, sixteen converts had been baptized and joined the church in Mexico City, in large part due to the influence of Dr. Rhodakanaty. In 1880, Desideria Quintanar de Yáñez became the first woman in Mexico City to join the church. Missionary work in central Mexico continued until 1889, when all missionaries were withdrawn due to the strong opposition to foreign ministers following La Reforma.

=== Re-establishment of the church ===
In 1901, the church's Mexican Mission was re-established, with Ammon M. Tenney serving as its president. This period of the church in Mexico was characterized by the calling of missionaries with highly developed Spanish language skills, the increasing indigenous leadership of branches, and the constant effort to reclaim members that had fallen away during the church's absence. In 1910, Rey L. Pratt became the mission president, but was forced to leave Mexico City in the fall of 1913 due to rising safety concerns due to the Mexican Revolution. Before his departure, Pratt was able to leave most of the branches in Central Mexico under the leadership of local members.

During the Mexican Revolution, tensions rose with regards to foreign religions, as did anti-American sentiments. In 1915, two members of the church in San Marcos, Hidalgo named Rafael Monroy and Vicente Morales were killed by the Liberation Army of the South (Zapatistas) for refusing to renounce their faith and for their association with foreigners. The two were taken and interrogated by a group of Zapatista soldiers, who had initially demanded food and other supplies from the Monroy family store. Monroy was asked by the soldiers to show his weapons, to which he responded by holding up the copies of the Bible and Book of Mormon he carried in his pocket and saying, "These are the only weapons I carry." After the store was searched and no weapons or ammunition were found, Monroy and Morales, an employee of the family, were both taken prisoner by the soldiers and later executed by firing squad.

Pratt remained as mission president until his death, also working to establish missionary work among the Spanish-speaking populations in the Southwestern United States. In 1926, the Mexican government deported all foreign clerics from the country, including Mormon missionaries from North America. This lasted until 1934, when foreign missionary efforts were able to resume. During this hiatus, Mexican members of the church were able to coordinate with one another and preserve the church doctrine and practices.

In 1936, a group of church members known as the Third Convention—who had been influenced by the spirit of the Mexican Revolution—called for a native-born Mexican to serve as president of the church's mission in Mexico. The tactics of this group led to the excommunication of its leaders. In 1946, church president George Albert Smith visited Mexico and was able to establish a reconciliation with most of the members of the Third Convention, and the vast majority of this group were brought back into the church.

In 1956, the Mexican Mission was divided for the first time with the organization of the Northern Mexican Mission. From this time forward, the church focused on strengthening the structure of the church in order for stakes to be organized.

=== 1960 to present ===
Church membership began to expand rapidly during the late 1960s, reaching 100,000 members by 1972. As membership increased, church leaders began making regular visits to church members in Mexico. In 1972, church president Harold B. Lee spoke to members at a Mexico City area conference, along with his counselors, several apostles, and other leaders. In early 1977, church president Spencer W. Kimball spoke to a large number of church members at area conferences in both Mexico City and Monterrey, with nearly 25,000 members attending in Mexico City. During his visit, Kimball also met with Mexican president José López Portillo at the national palace in Mexico City.

The first Spanish-speaking stake in the church was organized in Mexico City in 1961. In 1966, Agricol Lozano became the first Mexican-born church member to serve as a stake president. In 1970, the Monterrey Stake (now the Monterrey Mexico Mitras Stake) was organized with Guillermo G. Garza as its president. This was the first stake organized in Mexico outside of the Mormon colonies and the Mexico City area.

On December 2, 1983, the Mexico City Temple and visitors’ center were dedicated by Gordon B. Hinckley, marking the first temple in Mexico.

== Church education in Mexico ==
A movement began in the mid-20th century which focused on the organization of a church school system in Mexico. The movement was initiated by Claudio Bowsan, the president of the Mexican Mission at the time. Bowsan bought property in Churhbusco, Mexico City and established a committee—composed of Marion G. Romney, Joseph T. Bentley, and Bowsan himself—to establish schools in Mexico. With the help and approval of the church's First Presidency, a private high school was founded on the land purchased by Bowsan in 1964 known as the Centro Escolar Benemérito de las Américas (commonly known as the "Benemérito"). At its founding, the school had 125 students and contained primary, secondary, and preparatory-level classes. It eventually became a large preparatory school, accommodating day students as well as boarding students. At its peak, there were more than 2,100 students in attendance. It was closed at the end of the 2012–2013 school year, and its campus was converted into a missionary training center (MTC).

Another church-established school in Mexico is the Academia Juárez, which was first established as the Juárez Stake Academy in September 1897 with 291 students. Located within the church's Colonia Juárez in Chihuahua, the school was similar to academies found in the Utah territory, and provided English-language instruction intended for "an Anglo population". The school was not closed when other academies were closed in the 1920s and 1930s, likely because public school education in Mexico during the Mexican Revolution was inadequate. Settlers from Utah Territory remained isolated and aloof from native Mexicans, celebrating American holidays and teaching in English. Moises de la Pena, a Mexican academic, declared that the school was an "illegal privilege" in 1950. The school is still in operation, with 418 students as of the 2012–2013 school year, and approximately 80% of the students are members of the church. The school now utilizes a unique dual-language program beginning in kindergarten and continuing through high school.

== Mormon colonies ==
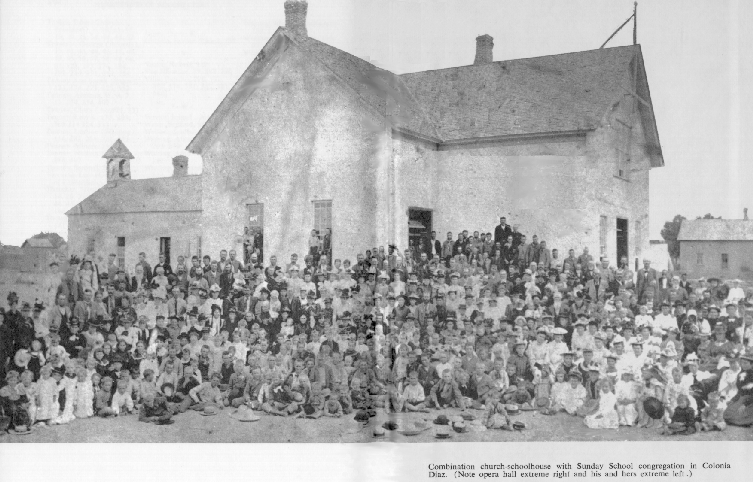
A former LDS Church meetinghouse in Colonia Diaz, Chihuahua, Mexico. It was the first such meetinghouse in Mexico and was destroyed in 1912 when the whole community was ransacked during the Mexican Revolution.

In 1885, a group of Latter-day Saints from the Utah and Arizona territories fleeing the U.S. federal government's prosecution of Mormon polygamists settled in the Mexican state of Chihuahua. These Latter-day Saints eventually founded the settlements of Colonia Juárez and Colonia Dublán, along with four others in Chihuahua and two in the state of Sonora. Most of the remaining Mormon colonists in the north of Mexico left the country in 1912 due to rising violence, but many were able to return in later years. In 1959, the church established a network of schools outside of Colonia Juárez. The Academia Juárez is located within the Colonia Juárez in Chihuahua.

== Stakes and districts ==
As of July 2026, Mexico had the following stakes and districts:

| Stake/District | Organized | Mission | Temple |
|---|---|---|---|
| Acapulco México Costa Azul Stake | 15 Oct 2000 | México Cuernavaca | Mexico City Mexico |
| Acapulco México Stake | 24 Sep 1989 | México Cuernavaca | Mexico City Mexico |
| Acayucan México Stake | 16 Mar 1997 | México Villahermosa | Villahermosa Mexico |
| Acuña México District | 1 Dec 1996 | México Saltillo | Monterrey Mexico |
| Aguascalientes México Jardines Stake | 31 May 1998 | México Aguascalientes | Guadalajara Mexico |
| Aguascalientes México Stake | 17 May 1987 | México Aguascalientes | Guadalajara Mexico |
| Amecameca México Stake | 28 Jun 1998 | México Cuautla | Mexico City Mexico |
| Apodaca México Stake | 22 May 2005 | México Monterrey West | Monterrey Mexico |
| Atlixco México Stake | 16 Jan 1994 | México Puebla South | Puebla Mexico |
| Atotonilco México Stake | 25 Feb 2007 | México Tula | Mexico City Mexico |
| Bermejillo México District | 26 Nov 2000 | México Torreón | Monterrey Mexico |
| Cabo San Lucas México Stake | 7 Jun 2009 | México Culiacán | Mexico City Mexico |
| Caborca México District | 21 Jul 1976 | México Mexicali | Hermosillo Sonora Mexico |
| Calkini México District | 16 Jun 1992 | México Mérida | Mérida Mexico |
| Campeche México Stake | 27 May 1984 | México Mérida | Mérida Mexico |
| Cancún México Haciendas Stake | 15 May 2005 | México Cancún | Mérida Mexico |
| Cancún México Kabáh Stake | 26 Apr 1998 | México Cancún | Mérida Mexico |
| Cancún México Stake | 28 May 1995 | México Cancún | Mérida Mexico |
| Cárdenas México Stake | 20 Apr 1997 | México Villahermosa | Villahermosa Mexico |
| Celaya México Stake | 11 Jun 1978 | México Querétaro | Mexico City Mexico |
| Chahuites México District | 29 Feb 2004 | México Tuxtla Gutiérrez | Tuxtla Gutiérrez |
| Chalco México Solidaridad Stake | 23 May 2004 | México México City Southeast | Mexico City Mexico |
| Chalco México Stake | 9 Nov 1975 | México Cuautla | Mexico City Mexico |
| Chapala México District | 24 Jun 2012 | México Guadalajara East | Guadalajara Mexico |
| Chetumal México Stake | 27 Oct 1991 | México Cancún | Mérida Mexico |
| Chihuahua México Chuviscar Stake | 1 Mar 1987 | México Chihuahua | Ciudad Juárez Mexico |
| Chihuahua México Stake | 13 Nov 1976 | México Chihuahua | Ciudad Juárez Mexico |
| Chihuahua México Tecnológico Stake | 26 Nov 1989 | México Chihuahua | Ciudad Juárez Mexico |
| Chilpancingo México Stake | 25 May 1997 | México Cuernavaca | Mexico City Mexico |
| Chojolhó México District | 18 Sep 2011 | México Tuxtla Gutiérrez | Tuxtla Gutiérrez |
| Ciudad del Carmen México Stake | 10 Nov 1987 | México Villahermosa | Villahermosa Mexico |
| Ciudad Guzmán México District | 17 Nov 1982 | México Guadalajara | Guadalajara Mexico |
| Ciudad Juárez México East Stake | 24 Feb 1980 | México Ciudad Juárez | Ciudad Juárez Mexico |
| Ciudad Juárez México La Cuesta Stake | 10 Nov 1996 | México Ciudad Juárez | Ciudad Juárez Mexico |
| Ciudad Juárez México Las Torres Stake | 23 Nov 2014 | México Ciudad Juárez | Ciudad Juárez Mexico |
| Ciudad Juárez México North Stake | 9 Oct 1988 | México Ciudad Juárez | Ciudad Juárez Mexico |
| Ciudad Juárez México South Stake | 14 Nov 1976 | México Ciudad Juárez | Ciudad Juárez Mexico |
| Ciudad Mante México Stake | 1 Nov 1981 | México Tampico | Tampico Mexico |
| Ciudad Obregón México Nainari Stake | 19 Feb 1989 | México Hermosillo | Hermosillo Sonora Mexico |
| Ciudad Obregón México Stake | 10 Oct 1976 | México Hermosillo | Hermosillo Sonora Mexico |
| Ciudad Valles México Stake | 12 Nov 2000 | México Tampico | Tampico Mexico |
| Ciudad Victoria México North Stake | 1 Mar 2015 | México Tampico | Tampico Mexico |
| Ciudad Victoria México Stake | 12 Dec 1976 | México Tampico | Tampico Mexico |
| Coahuila México Madero District | 20 Oct 1990 | México Torreón | Monterrey Mexico |
| Coatzacoalcos México Stake | 1 Jul 1979 | México Villahermosa | Villahermosa Mexico |
| Colima México Stake | 24 May 2009 | México Guadalajara | Guadalajara Mexico |
| Colonia Dublán México Stake | 25 Feb 1990 | México Ciudad Juárez | Colonia Juárez Chihuahua |
| Colonia Juárez México Stake | 9 Dec 1895 | México Ciudad Juárez | Colonia Juárez Chihuahua |
| Comitán México District | 1 Nov 2015 | México Tuxtla Gutiérrez | Tuxtla Gutiérrez |
| Córdoba México Stake | 21 Apr 2013 | México Puebla East | Veracruz Mexico |
| Cuauhtémoc México District | 8 Jun 2014 | México Chihuahua | Colonia Juárez Chihuahua |
| Cuautla México Palmas Stake | 19 Jun 1994 | México Cuautla | Puebla Mexico |
| Cuautla México Stake | 9 Nov 1975 | México Cuautla | Puebla Mexico |
| Cuautla México Zapata Stake | 25 Apr 1999 | México Cuautla | Puebla Mexico |
| Cuernavaca México Civac Stake | 21 Mar 1999 | México Cuernavaca | Mexico City Mexico |
| Cuernavaca México Stake | 5 Jun 1983 | México Cuernavaca | Mexico City Mexico |
| Culiacán México Humaya Stake | 12 Feb 1989 | México Culiacán | Hermosillo Sonora Mexico |
| Culiacán México Stake | 22 May 1977 | México Culiacán | Hermosillo Sonora Mexico |
| Culiacán México Tamazula Stake | 21 Jun 1987 | México Culiacán | Hermosillo Sonora Mexico |
| Delicias México Stake | 18 Dec 1988 | México Chihuahua | Ciudad Juárez Mexico |
| Durango México Del Valle Stake | 28 May 1995 | México Torreón | Mexico City Mexico |
| Durango México Stake | 21 Jan 1981 | México Torreón | Mexico City Mexico |
| El Dorado México District | 15 Apr 1961 | México Culiacán | Hermosillo Sonora Mexico |
| El Fuerte México District | 25 Feb 1996 | México Culiacán | Hermosillo Sonora Mexico |
| Ensenada México Stake | 24 Jun 1990 | México Tijuana | Tijuana Mexico |
| Escuinapa México District | 16 Aug 1970 | México Culiacán | Guadalajara Mexico |
| Fresnillo México Stake | 23 Sep 2001 | México Aguascalientes | Guadalajara Mexico |
| Galeana México Stake | 7 Jun 2009 | México Cuernavaca | Mexico City Mexico |
| Gómez Palacio México La Laguna Stake | 6 May 1990 | México Torreón | Monterrey Mexico |
| Gómez Palacio México Stake | 28 May 1978 | México Torreón | Monterrey Mexico |
| Guadalajara México Bugambilias Stake | 3 May 1998 | México Guadalajara East | Guadalajara Mexico |
| Guadalajara México Independencia Stake | 27 Sep 1980 | México Guadalajara | Guadalajara Mexico |
| Guadalajara México Lomas Stake | 7 Jun 1998 | México Guadalajara | Guadalajara Mexico |
| Guadalajara México Reforma Stake | 23 Jun 1957 | México Guadalajara East | Guadalajara Mexico |
| Guadalajara México Tlaquepaque Stake | 21 Jun 1998 | México Guadalajara East | Guadalajara Mexico |
| Guadalajara México Unión Stake | 23 Feb 1975 | México Guadalajara | Guadalajara Mexico |
| Guasave México District | 25 May 1980 | México Culiacán | Hermosillo Sonora Mexico |
| Guaymas México Stake | 17 Aug 1990 | México Hermosillo | Hermosillo Sonora Mexico |
| Hermosillo México Pitic Stake | 26 Apr 1987 | México Hermosillo | Hermosillo Sonora Mexico |
| Hermosillo México Stake | 8 Oct 1976 | México Hermosillo | Hermosillo Sonora Mexico |
| Huatulco México District | 21 Mar 1999 | México Oaxaca | Oaxaca Mexico |
| Huejutla de Reyes México District | 3 Nov 1996 | México Tampico | Tampico Mexico |
| Ignacio Mejía México District | 20 Oct 1982 | México Puebla East | Puebla Mexico |
| Iguala México Stake | 15 Oct 1995 | México Cuernavaca | Mexico City Mexico |
| Irapuato México Stake | 8 Feb 1981 | México Querétaro | Guadalajara Mexico |
| Izúcar de Matamoros México District | 27 Jun 2004 | México Puebla South | Puebla Mexico |
| Juchitán México Las Flores Stake | 23 Nov 1997 | México Oaxaca | Oaxaxa Gutiérrez |
| Juchitán México Stake | 22 Jul 1990 | México Oaxaca | Oaxaxa Gutiérrez |
| La Paz México Stake | 10 Sep 1989 | México Culiacán | Mexico City Mexico |
| Las Choapas México District | 17 Jun 2018 | México Villahermosa | Villahermosa Mexico |
| Lázaro Cárdenas México Stake | 21 Jun 2009 | México Guadalajara East | Mexico City Mexico |
| León México Stake | 11 Aug 1996 | México Querétaro | Guadalajara Mexico |
| León México Aeropuerto Stake | 8 Mar 2026 | México Querétaro | Guadalajara Mexico |
| Lerma México Stake | 15 Jun 2014 | México México City West | Mexico City Mexico |
| Linares México District | 11 Apr 1989 | México Monterrey West | Monterrey Mexico |
| Los Mochis México Stake | 5 Mar 1989 | México Culiacán | Hermosillo Sonora Mexico |
| Los Tuxtla México Stake | 24 Feb 1982 | México Veracruz | Veracruz Mexico |
| Madero México Stake | 11 Dec 1976 | México Tampico | Tampico Mexico |
| Manzanillo México District | 10 Nov 1987 | México Guadalajara | Guadalajara Mexico |
| Martínez de la Torre México Stake | 13 Mar 2011 | México Xalapa | Veracruz Mexico |
| Matamoros México Stake | 18 May 1980 | México Monterrey East | Monterrey Mexico |
| Matías Romero México District | 8 Oct 2017 | México Oaxaca | Oaxaxa Mexico |
| Mazatlán México Stake | 7 May 1989 | México Culiacán | Guadalajara Mexico |
| Mérida México Brisas Stake | 20 Nov 2005 | México Mérida | Mérida Mexico |
| Mérida México Caucel Stake | 4 Dec 2022 | México Mérida | Mérida Mexico |
| Mérida México Centro Stake | 11 Jun 1989 | México Mérida | Mérida Mexico |
| Mérida México Chuburná Stake | 18 Sep 2005 | México Mérida | Mérida Mexico |
| Mérida México Itzimná Stake | 10 Jun 1990 | México Mérida | Mérida Mexico |
| Mérida México Lakín Stake | 14 May 1978 | México Mérida | Mérida Mexico |
| Mérida México Stake | 22 Jan 1977 | México Mérida | Mérida Mexico |
| Metepec México Stake | 27 Nov 2005 | México México City West | Mexico City Mexico |
| Mexicali México Los Pinos Stake | 18 Jan 1987 | México Mexicali | Tijuana Mexico |
| Mexicali México Stake | 20 Mar 1977 | México Mexicali | Tijuana Mexico |
| México City Alamedas Stake | 28 Apr 2013 | México México City North | Mexico City Mexico |
| México City Anáhuac Stake | 29 Jun 1986 | México México City East | Mexico City Mexico |
| México City Aragón Stake | 27 May 1973 | México México City East | Mexico City Mexico |
| México City Arbolillo Stake | 15 Sep 1974 | México México City Northwest | Mexico City Mexico |
| México City Azteca Stake | 6 Dec 1981 | México México City East | Mexico City Mexico |
| México City Bosques Stake | 14 Jun 1998 | México México City North | Mexico City Mexico |
| México City Camarones Stake | 8 Nov 1975 | México México City Northwest | Mexico City Mexico |
| México City Chapultepec Stake | 27 Jun 1982 | México México City West | Mexico City Mexico |
| México City Churubusco Stake | 8 Nov 1975 | México México City South | Mexico City Mexico |
| México City Coacalco Stake | 30 Nov 2008 | México México City North | Mexico City Mexico |
| México City Contreras Stake | 11 Dec 1994 | México México City South | Mexico City Mexico |
| México City Cuautepec Stake | 20 May 1990 | México México City Northwest | Mexico City Mexico |
| México City Cuautitlán Stake | 8 Jul 1990 | México Tula | Mexico City Mexico |
| México City Culturas Stake | 17 Jun 1990 | México México City West | Mexico City Mexico |
| México City Ecatepec Stake | 6 Dec 1987 | México México City North | Mexico City Mexico |
| México City El Lago Stake | 9 Dec 2018 | México México City East | Mexico City Mexico |
| México City Ermita Stake | 8 Nov 1975 | México México City South | Mexico City Mexico |
| México City Industrial Stake | 9 Nov 1975 | México México City Northwest | Mexico City Mexico |
| México City Ixtapaluca Stake | 7 Nov 2004 | México México City Southeast | Mexico City Mexico |
| México City La Perla Stake | 24 Jun 1990 | México México City Southeast | Mexico City Mexico |
| México City Lindavista Stake | 8 Oct 1978 | México México City Northwest | Mexico City Mexico |
| México City Lomas Verdes Stake | 18 Apr 1999 | México México City West | Mexico City Mexico |
| México City Los Heroes Tecamac Stake | 2 Dec 2018 | México México City East | Mexico City Mexico |
| México City Los Reyes Stake | 17 Nov 1996 | México México City Southeast | Mexico City Mexico |
| México City Madero Stake | 15 May 1994 | México México City Northwest | Mexico City Mexico |
| México City Melchor Ocampo Stake | 9 Feb 1997 | México Tula | Mexico City Mexico |
| México City Meyehualco Stake | 14 Oct 1979 | México México City South | Mexico City Mexico |
| México City Moctezuma Stake | 9 Nov 1975 | México México City East | Mexico City Mexico |
| México City Netzahualcóyotl Stake | 9 Nov 1975 | México México City Southeast | Mexico City Mexico |
| México City Oriental Stake | 19 Jun 1983 | México México City Southeast | Mexico City Mexico |
| México City Paraíso Stake | 13 Jan 2002 | México México City Southeast | Mexico City Mexico |
| México City Tacubaya Stake | 8 Nov 1975 | México México City West | Mexico City Mexico |
| México City Tecamac Stake | 1 Dec 1996 | México Pachuca | Mexico City Mexico |
| México City Tenayo Stake | 24 Nov 2002 | México México City Northwest | Mexico City Mexico |
| México City Tlahuac Stake | 26 Oct 1997 | México México City South | Mexico City Mexico |
| México City Tlalnepantla Stake | 9 Nov 1975 | México México City North | Mexico City Mexico |
| México City Tlalpan Stake | 27 Jun 1982 | México México City South | Mexico City Mexico |
| México City Tultitlán Stake | 28 Nov 1985 | México México City North | Mexico City Mexico |
| México City Villa Coapa Stake | 12 Nov 2006 | México México City South | Mexico City Mexico |
| México City Villa de las Flores Stake | 9 Nov 1975 | México México City North | Mexico City Mexico |
| Minatitlán México Stake | 23 Nov 2025 | México Villahermosa | Villahermosa Mexico |
| Mixteca México District | 12 Jul 2015 | México Oaxaca | Oaxaca Mexico |
| Monclova México East Stake | 30 Nov 2003 | México Saltillo | Monterrey Mexico |
| Monclova México Stake | 26 May 1974 | México Saltillo | Monterrey Mexico |
| Monterrey México Anáhuac Stake | 17 Oct 1976 | México Monterrey West | Monterrey Mexico |
| Monterrey México Andalucía Stake | 3 Sep 2000 | México Monterrey East | Monterrey Mexico |
| Monterrey México Libertad Stake | 7 May 1972 | México Monterrey East | Monterrey Mexico |
| Monterrey México Lincoln Stake | 3 Dec 2023 | México Monterrey West | Monterrey Mexico |
| Monterrey México Los Angeles Stake | 22 Jul 1990 | México Monterrey East | Monterrey Mexico |
| Monterrey México Mitras Stake | 22 Mar 1970 | México Monterrey West | Monterrey Mexico |
| Monterrey México Moderna Stake | 9 Mar 1980 | México Monterrey West | Monterrey Mexico |
| Monterrey México Roma Stake | 16 Oct 1976 | México Monterrey West | Monterrey Mexico |
| Monterrey México Valle Verde Stake | 2 Nov 1986 | México Monterrey West | Monterrey Mexico |
| Morelia México Aeropuerto Stake | 21 Jun 2009 | México Guadalajara East | Mexico City Mexico |
| Morelia México Stake | 4 Jan 1998 | México Guadalajara East | Mexico City Mexico |
| Navojoa México District | 23 Dec 1987 | México Hermosillo | Hermosillo Sonora Mexico |
| Nealtican México North Stake | 12 Aug 2012 | México Puebla North | Puebla Mexico |
| Nealtican México South Stake | 5 Jun 2022 | México Puebla North | Puebla Mexico |
| Nealtican México Stake | 17 Jun 1990 | México Puebla North | Puebla Mexico |
| Nogales México District | 22 Jan 1991 | México Hermosillo | Hermosillo Sonora Mexico |
| Nueva Rosita México District | 13 Nov 1982 | México Saltillo | Monterrey Mexico |
| Nuevo Laredo México Stake | 15 Mar 1998 | México Monterrey West | Monterrey Mexico |
| Oaxaca México Amapolas Stake | 21 Jun 1981 | México Oaxaca | Oaxaca Mexico |
| Oaxaca México Atoyac Stake | 12 Nov 2000 | México Oaxaca | Oaxaca Mexico |
| Oaxaca México Brenamiel Stake | 5 Jun 2022 | México Oaxaca | Oaxaca Mexico |
| Oaxaca México Mitla Stake | 30 Jun 1996 | México Oaxaca | Oaxaca Mexico |
| Oaxaca México Monte Albán Stake | 7 Feb 1988 | México Oaxaca | Oaxaca Mexico |
| Orizaba México Stake | 16 Jan 1977 | México Puebla East | Veracruz Mexico |
| Pachuca México Centro Stake | 28 Jan 1996 | México Pachuca | Mexico City Mexico |
| Pachuca México South Stake | 15 Jun 2008 | México Pachuca | Mexico City Mexico |
| Pachuca México Stake | 18 Mar 1984 | México Pachuca | Mexico City Mexico |
| Pánuco México District | 3 Nov 1996 | México Tampico | Tampico Mexico |
| Papantla México Stake | 23 Apr 1989 | México Xalapa | Tampico Mexico |
| Parral México District | 31 Aug 1977 | México Chihuahua | Colonia Juárez Chihuahua |
| Piedras Negras México Stake | 21 Aug 1977 | México Saltillo | Monterrey Mexico |
| Pinotepa México District | 15 Jun 2008 | México Cuernavaca | Oaxaca Mexico |
| Playa del Carmen México Stake | 26 Apr 2015 | México Cancún | Mérida Mexico |
| Poza Rica México Palmas Stake | 15 Jan 1977 | México Xalapa | Tampico Mexico |
| Poza Rica México Stake | 13 Nov 1975 | México Xalapa | Tampico Mexico |
| Puebla México Amalucan Stake | 25 Aug 1996 | México Puebla East | Puebla Mexico |
| Puebla México Angelópolis Stake | 27 Feb 2000 | México Puebla South | Puebla Mexico |
| Puebla México Arboledas Stake | 25 Jun 2017 | México Puebla South | Puebla Mexico |
| Puebla México Cholula Stake | 12 Mar 1978 | México Puebla South | Puebla Mexico |
| Puebla México Citlaltépetl District | 16 Apr 2017 | México Puebla East | Puebla Mexico |
| Puebla México Fuertes Stake | 11 Oct 1981 | México Puebla East | Puebla Mexico |
| Puebla México La Libertad Stake | 14 Dec 1997 | México Puebla South | Puebla Mexico |
| Puebla México La Paz Stake | 16 Feb 1975 | México Puebla East | Puebla Mexico |
| Puebla México Ometoxtla Stake | 2 Jun 2019 | México Puebla North | Puebla Mexico |
| Puebla México Valsequillo Stake | 16 Feb 1975 | México Puebla South | Puebla Mexico |
| Puerto Escondido México District | 25 Jun 1995 | México Oaxaca | Oaxaca Mexico |
| Puerto Peñasco México District | 27 Mar 2011 | México Mexicali | Tijuana Mexico |
| Puerto Vallarta México Stake | 24 Apr 2005 | México Guadalajara | Guadalajara Mexico |
| Querétaro México El Sol Stake | 11 Mar 2012 | México Querétaro | Mexico City Mexico |
| Querétaro México Los Arcos Stake | 12 Mar 2000 | México Querétaro | Mexico City Mexico |
| Querétaro México Stake | 19 Mar 1995 | México Querétaro | Mexico City Mexico |
| Querétaro México Valle Stake | 10 Jul 2022 | México Querétaro | Mexico City Mexico |
| Reynosa México East Stake | 16 Mar 2003 | México Monterrey East | Monterrey Mexico |
| Reynosa México Stake | 18 May 1980 | México Monterrey East | Monterrey Mexico |
| Salina Cruz México Stake | 5 Feb 1995 | México Oaxaca | Oaxaca Mexico |
| Saltillo México Miravalle Stake | 12 Aug 1990 | México Saltillo | Monterrey Mexico |
| Saltillo México República Stake | 29 Jun 1980 | México Saltillo | Monterrey Mexico |
| Saltillo México Valle de las Flores Stake | 12 Feb 2012 | México Saltillo | Monterrey Mexico |
| San Cristóbal México District | 15 Apr 2007 | México Tuxtla Gutiérrez | Tuxtla Gutiérrez |
| San Luis Potosí México Benito Juárez Stake | 4 Aug 1996 | México Aguascalientes | Mexico City Mexico |
| San Luis Potosí México Industrias Stake | 21 Aug 2022 | México Aguascalientes | Mexico City Mexico |
| San Luis Potosí México Stake | 1 Feb 1981 | México Aguascalientes | Mexico City Mexico |
| San Luis Rio Colorado México Stake | 28 Jun 2009 | México Mexicali | Tijuana Mexico |
| San Nicolás México Stake | 17 Nov 1996 | México Monterrey West | Monterrey Mexico |
| Santiago Ixcuintla México District | 3 Feb 1987 | México Guadalajara | Guadalajara Mexico |
| Sierra Madre México District | 1 Jan 1974 | México Hermosillo | Colonia Juárez Chihuahua |
| Tamaulipas México Río Bravo District | 3 Jul 1990 | México Monterrey East | Monterrey Mexico |
| Tampico México Bosque Stake | 12 Nov 1995 | México Tampico | Tampico Mexico |
| Tampico México Stake | 27 Feb 1972 | México Tampico | Tampico Mexico |
| Tapachula México Izapa Stake | 8 Jul 1990 | México Tuxtla Gutiérrez | Tuxtla Gutiérrez |
| Tapachula México Stake | 20 Aug 1978 | México Tuxtla Gutiérrez | Tuxtla Gutiérrez |
| Tecalco México Stake | 25 Jun 1989 | México Cuautla | Mexico City Mexico |
| Tehuacán México Stake | 18 Apr 1999 | México Puebla East | Puebla Mexico |
| Tepic México Stake | 15 Dec 1996 | México Guadalajara | Guadalajara Mexico |
| Teziutlán México Stake | 7 Mar 1999 | México Xalapa | Puebla Mexico |
| Tezontepec México Stake | 4 Mar 2012 | México Tula | Mexico City Mexico |
| Ticul México District | 16 Jun 1992 | México Mérida | Mérida Mexico |
| Tierra Blanca México Stake | 12 Jan 2003 | México Veracruz | Veracruz Mexico |
| Tijuana México Florido Stake | 13 Mar 2005 | México Mexicali | Tijuana Mexico |
| Tijuana México Insurgentes Stake | 13 Oct 1996 | México Mexicali | Tijuana Mexico |
| Tijuana México La Gloria Stake | 14 Jan 2001 | México Tijuana | Tijuana Mexico |
| Tijuana México La Mesa Stake | 9 Feb 1986 | México Tijuana | Tijuana Mexico |
| Tijuana México Otay Stake | 11 Mar 2001 | México Tijuana | Tijuana Mexico |
| Tijuana México Stake | 11 Mar 2001 | México Tijuana | Tijuana Mexico |
| Tizayuca México Stake | 2 Dec 2018 | México Tula | Mexico City Mexico |
| Tizimín México Stake | 1 Mar 1998 | México Cancún | Mérida Mexico |
| Tlaxcala México North Stake | 17 Aug 2003 | México Puebla North | Puebla Mexico |
| Tlaxcala México Stake | 11 Feb 1996 | México Puebla North | Puebla Mexico |
| Toluca México Stake | 17 Nov 1991 | México México City West | Mexico City Mexico |
| Tonalá México District | 1 Jan 1987 | México Tuxtla Gutiérrez | Tuxtla Gutiérrez |
| Torreón México Jardín Stake | 12 May 1985 | México Torreón | Monterrey Mexico |
| Torreón México Reforma Stake | 15 Oct 1989 | México Torreón | Monterrey Mexico |
| Torreón México Stake | 14 Nov 1976 | México Torreón | Monterrey Mexico |
| Tula México Stake | 9 Nov 1975 | México Tula | Mexico City Mexico |
| Tulancingo México Stake | 14 Feb 2010 | México Pachuca | Mexico City Mexico |
| Tuxpan México Stake | 28 Jun 2009 | México Xalapa | Tampico Mexico |
| Tuxtepec México Stake | 6 Jun 1993 | México Veracruz | Veracruz Mexico |
| Tuxtla Gutiérrez México Grijalva Stake | 26 Feb 1995 | México Tuxtla Gutiérrez | Tuxtla Gutiérrez |
| Tuxtla Gutiérrez México Mactumatzá Stake | 2 Sep 2007 | México Tuxtla Gutiérrez | Tuxtla Gutiérrez |
| Tuxtla Gutiérrez México Stake | 31 Aug 1980 | México Tuxtla Gutiérrez | Tuxtla Gutiérrez |
| Uruapan México Stake | 7 Jun 2009 | México Guadalajara East | Guadalajara Mexico |
| Valle del Mezquital México Stake | 13 Sep 1987 | México Pachuca | Mexico City Mexico |
| Valle Hermoso México Stake | 28 Oct 1973 | México Monterrey East | Monterrey Mexico |
| Veracruz México Mocambo Stake | 20 May 1990 | México Veracruz | Veracruz Mexico |
| Veracruz México Puerto Stake | 5 Aug 2019 | México Veracruz | Veracruz Mexico |
| Veracruz México Reforma Stake | 16 Jan 1977 | México Veracruz | Veracruz Mexico |
| Veracruz México Stake | 15 Jun 1975 | México Veracruz | Veracruz Mexico |
| Veracruz México Villa Rica Stake | 5 Nov 1995 | México Veracruz | Veracruz Mexico |
| Villahermosa México Gaviotas Stake | 15 Apr 1990 | México Villahermosa | Villahermosa Mexico |
| Villahermosa México Stake | 10 Aug 1980 | México Villahermosa | Villahermosa Mexico |
| Xalapa México Macuiltepetl Stake | 8 Mar 2015 | México Xalapa | Veracruz Mexico |
| Xalapa México Stake | 2 Mar 1986 | México Xalapa | Veracruz Mexico |
| Zacatecas México Stake | 16 Apr 2000 | México Aguascalientes | Guadalajara Mexico |
| Zamora México Stake | 22 Sep 1996 | México Guadalajara East | Guadalajara Mexico |
| Zapata México District | 12 Jun 1990 | México Villahermosa | Villahermosa Mexico |
| Zitácuaro México District | 26 Mar 1966 | México México City West | Mexico City Mexico |

== Missions ==
The Benemérito de las Americas school in Mexico City was permanently closed at the end of the 2012–2013 term, and its campus became the new home of the Mexico City MTC, opening on June 26, 2013. This greatly expanded the capacity of the Mexico City MTC, which is second in size only to the MTC in Provo, Utah. The old training center campus near the Mexico City Mexico Temple could only accommodate 125 missionaries at a time, while the new 90-acre campus can handle over 1,000.

The following is a list of missions in Mexico:

| Mission | Organized |
|---|---|
| Mexico Aguascalientes Mission | 1 July 1989 |
| Mexico Cancun Mission | 1 July 2013 |
| Mexico Chihuahua Mission | 1 Sep 1987 |
| Mexico Ciudad Juarez Mission | 1 July 2013 |
| Mexico Cuernavaca Mission | 1 July 2006 |
| Mexico Culiacán Mission | 1 July 1987 |
| Mexico Guadalajara Mission | 1 July 1975 |
| Mexico Guadalajara East Mission | 1 July 2003 |
| Mexico Hermosillo Mission | 1 Nov 1960 |
| Mexico Mérida Mission | 1 July 1975 |
| Mexico Mexicali Mission | 1 July 2024 |
| Mexico Mexico City Chalco Mission | 1 July 2013 |
| Mexico Mexico City East Mission | 1 Jan 1987 |
| Mexico Mexico City North Mission | 1 July 1978 |
| Mexico Mexico City Northwest Mission | 30 June 2010 |
| Mexico Mexico City South Mission | 16 Nov 1879 |
| Mexico Mexico City Southeast Mission | 30 June 2011 |
| Mexico Mexico City West Mission | 1 July 2001 |
| Mexico Monterrey East Mission | 10 June 1956 |
| Mexico Monterrey West Mission | 30 Sep 1992 |
| Mexico Oaxaca Mission | 1 July 1990 |
| Mexico Pachuca Mission | 1 July 2013 |
| Mexico Puebla East Mission | 1 July 2024 |
| Mexico Puebla North Mission | 30 June 2012 |
| Mexico Puebla South Mission | 1 July 1988 |
| Mexico Querétaro Mission | 1 July 2013 |
| Mexico Saltillo Mission | 1 July 2013 |
| Mexico Tampico Mission | 5 Feb 1988 |
| Mexico Tijuana Mission | 1 July 1990 |
| Mexico Torreón Mission | 5 Aug 1968 |
| Mexico Tula Mission | 1 July 2026 |
| Mexico Tuxtla Gutierrez Mission | 19 Oct 1987 |
| Mexico Veracruz Mission | 27 Mar 1963 |
| Mexico Villahermosa Mission | 30 June 2010 |
| Mexico Xalapa Mission | 30 June 2012 |

== Temples ==
The Mexico City Mexico Temple was the first LDS Church temple in Mexico; it was dedicated in 1983 and rededicated after renovation in 2008. From 1999 to 2002, an additional 11 temples were dedicated in Mexico. This comes after June 29, 1993, when the Mexican government formally registered the LDS Church, allowing it to own property. There are 13 temples in Mexico, with an additional ten announced or under construction.

=== 20th century ===
| 26. Mexico City Mexico Temple; Official website; News & images | |
| Location: Announced: Groundbreaking: Dedicated: Rededicated: Size: Style: Notes: | Mexico City, Mexico; 3 April 1976 by Spencer W. Kimball; 25 November 1979 by Boyd K. Packer; 2 December 1983 by Gordon B. Hinckley; 16 November 2008 by Thomas S. Monson; 116,642 sq ft (10,836.4 m^{2}) on a 7-acre (2.8 ha) site Modern adaptation of ancient Mayan architecture - designed by Emil B. Fetzer; The Mexico City Mexico Temple was closed March 30, 2007 for renovations and was rededicated Sunday, November 16, 2008. The temple was again closed in early 2014 for renovations. A public open house was held from Friday, August 14, 2015, through Saturday, September 5, 2015, excluding Sundays. The temple was rededicated on Sunday, September 13, 2015. |
| 55. Colonia Juárez Chihuahua Mexico Temple; Official website; News & images | |
| Location: Announced: Groundbreaking: Dedicated: Size: Style: | Colonia Juárez, Chihuahua, Mexico; 4 October 1997 by Gordon B. Hinckley; 7 March 1998 by Eran A. Call; 6 March 1999 by Gordon B. Hinckley; 6,800 sq ft (630 m^{2}) on a 2.56-acre (1.04 ha) site Classic modern, single-spire design - designed by Alvaro Inigo and Church A&E Services |
| 71. Ciudad Juárez Mexico Temple; Official website; News & images | |
| Location: Announced: Groundbreaking: Dedicated: Size: Style: | Ciudad Juárez, Mexico; 7 May 1998 by Gordon B. Hinckley; 9 January 1999 by Eran A. Call; 26 February 2000 by Gordon B. Hinckley; 10,700 sq ft (990 m^{2}) on a 1.64-acre (0.66 ha) site Classic modern, single-spire design - designed by Alvaro Inigo and Church A&E Services |
| 72. Hermosillo Sonora Mexico Temple; Official website; News & images | |
| Location: Announced: Groundbreaking: Dedicated: Size: Style: | Hermosillo, Sonora, Mexico; 20 July 1998 by Gordon B. Hinckley; 5 December 1998 by Eran A. Call; 27 February 2000 by Gordon B. Hinckley; 10,769 sq ft (1,000.5 m^{2}) on a 1.54-acre (0.62 ha) site Classic modern, single-spire design - designed by Alvaro Inigo and Church A&E Services |
| 74. Oaxaca Mexico Temple; Official website; News & images | |
| Location: Announced: Groundbreaking: Dedicated: Size: Style: | Oaxaca, Mexico; 3 February 1999 by Gordon B. Hinckley; 13 March 1999 by Carl B. Pratt; 11 March 2000 by James E. Faust; 10,700 sq ft (990 m^{2}) on a 1.87-acre (0.76 ha) site Classic modern, single-spire design - designed by Alvaro Inigo and Church A&E Services |
| 75. Tuxtla Gutiérrez Mexico Temple; Official website; News & images | |
| Location: Announced: Groundbreaking: Dedicated: Size: Style: | Tuxtla Gutiérrez, Mexico; 25 February 1999 by Gordon B. Hinckley; 20 March 1999 by Richard E. Turley Sr. 12 March 2000 by James E. Faust; 10,700 sq ft (990 m^{2}) on a 1.56-acre (0.63 ha) site Classic modern, single-spire design - designed by Alvaro Inigo and Church A&E Services |
| 83. Tampico Mexico Temple; Official website; News & images | |
| Location: Announced: Groundbreaking: Dedicated: Size: Style: | Ciudad Madero, Mexico; 8 July 1998 by Gordon B. Hinckley; 28 November 1998 by Eran A. Call; 20 May 2000 by Thomas S. Monson; 10,700 sq ft (990 m^{2}) on a 2.96-acre (1.20 ha) site Classic modern, single-spire design - designed by Alvaro Inigo and Church A&E Services |
| 85. Villahermosa Mexico Temple; Official website; News & images | |
| Location: Announced: Groundbreaking: Dedicated: Size: Style: | Villahermosa, Mexico; 30 October 1998 by Gordon B. Hinckley; 9 January 1999 by Richard E. Turley Sr. 21 May 2000 by Thomas S. Monson; 10,700 sq ft (990 m^{2}) on a 1.36-acre (0.55 ha) site Classic modern, single-spire design - designed by Alvaro Inigo and Church A&E Services |
| 92. Mérida Mexico Temple; Official website; News & images | |
| Location: Announced: Groundbreaking: Dedicated: Size: Style: | Mérida, Yucatán, Mexico; 25 September 1998 by Gordon B. Hinckley; 16 January 1999 by Carl B. Pratt; 8 July 2000 by Thomas S. Monson; 10,700 sq ft (990 m^{2}) on a 1.53-acre (0.62 ha) site Classic modern, single-spire design - designed by Alvaro Inigo and Church A&E Services |
| 93. Veracruz Mexico Temple; Official website; News & images | |
| Location: Announced: Groundbreaking: Dedicated: Size: Style: | Boca del Río, Veracruz, Mexico; 14 April 1999 by Gordon B. Hinckley; 29 May 1999 by Carl B. Pratt; 9 July 2000 by Thomas S. Monson; 10,700 sq ft (990 m^{2}) on a 3.39-acre (1.37 ha) site Classic modern, single-spire design - designed by Alvaro Inigo and Church A&E Services |

Temples in Mexico

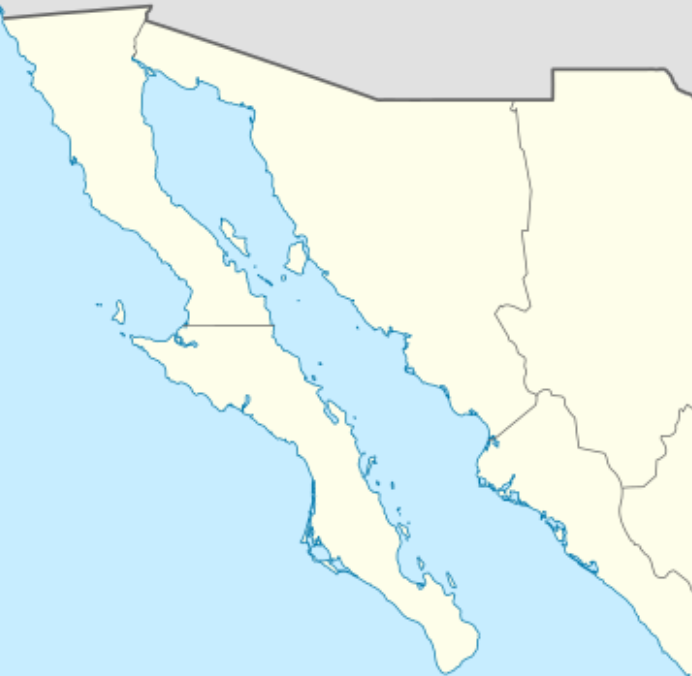

Temples in Northwestern Mexico

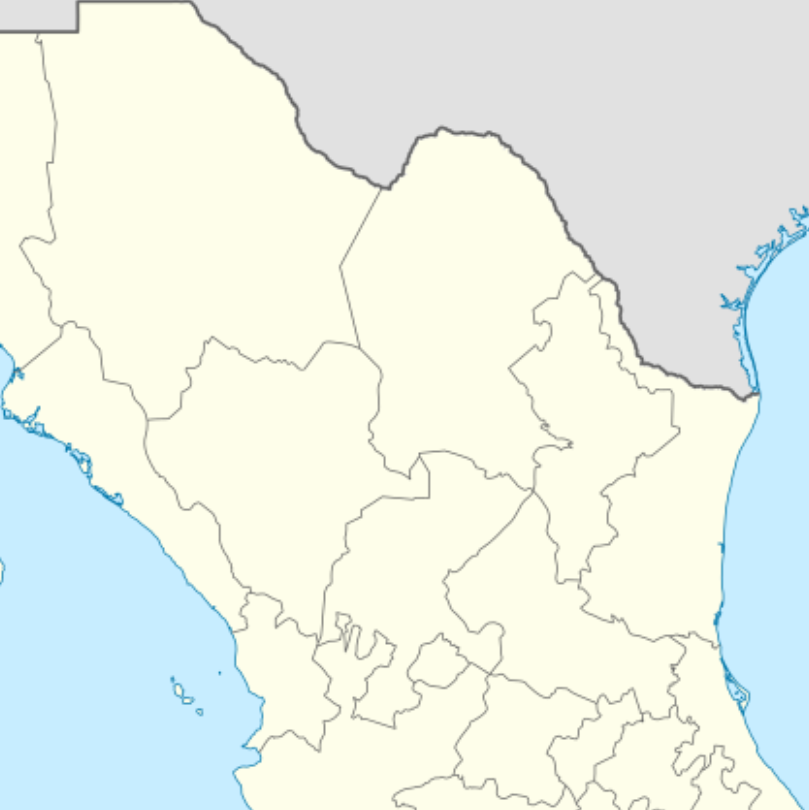

Temples in Northeastern Mexico

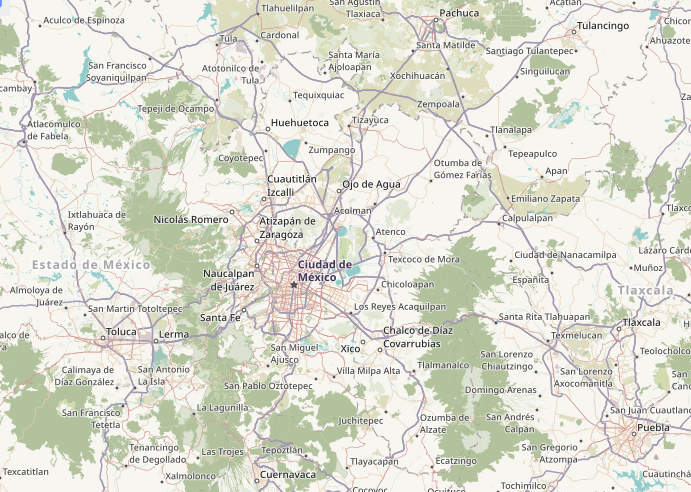

Temples in Central Mexico

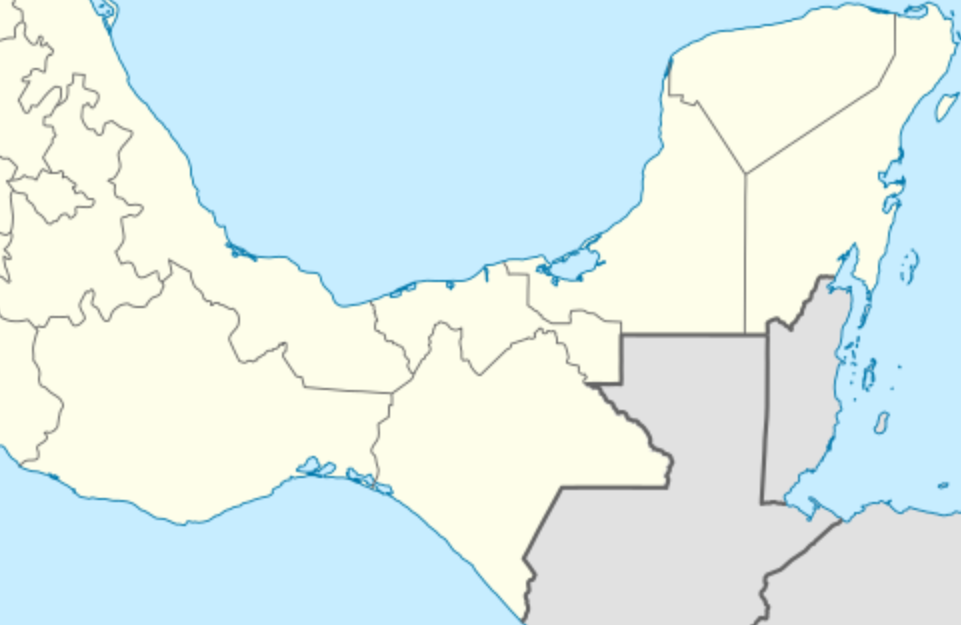

Temples in Southeast Mexico

- = Operating
- = Under construction
- = Announced
- = Temporarily Closed

=== 21st century ===
| 105. Guadalajara Mexico Temple; Official website; News & images | |
| Location: Announced: Groundbreaking: Dedicated: Size: Style: | Zapopan, Mexico; 14 April 1999 by Gordon B. Hinckley; 12 June 1999 by Eran A. Call; 29 April 2001 by Gordon B. Hinckley; 10,700 sq ft (990 m^{2}) on a 2.69-acre (1.09 ha) site Classic modern, single-spire design - designed by Alvaro Inigo and Church A&E Services |
| 110. Monterrey Mexico Temple; Official website; News & images | |
| Location: Announced: Groundbreaking: Dedicated: Size: Style: | Monterrey, Mexico; 21 December 1995 by Gordon B. Hinckley; 4 November 2000 by Lynn A. Mickelsen; 28 April 2002 by Gordon B. Hinckley; 16,498 sq ft (1,532.7 m^{2}) on a 7.78-acre (3.15 ha) site Classic modern, single-spire design - designed by Alvaro Inigo |
| 149. Tijuana Mexico Temple; Official website; News & images | |
| Location: Announced: Groundbreaking: Dedicated: Size: Notes: | Tijuana, Mexico; 2 October 2010 by Thomas S. Monson; 18 August 2012 by Benjamin de Hoyos; 13 December 2015 by Dieter F. Uchtdorf; 33,367 sq ft (3,099.9 m^{2}) on a 9.4-acre (3.8 ha) site A public open house was held from Friday, 13 November 2015, through Saturday, 28 November 2015. |
| 191. Puebla Mexico Temple; Official website; News & images | |
| Location: Announced: Groundbreaking: Dedicated: Size: | Puebla, Puebla, Mexico; 7 October 2018 by Russell M. Nelson; 30 November 2019 by Arnulfo Valenzuela; 19 May 2024 by Gerrit W. Gong; 35,861 sq ft (3,331.6 m^{2}) on a 6.81-acre (2.76 ha) site |

=== Under construction ===
| 228. San Luis Potosí Mexico Temple (Dedication scheduled); Official website; News & images | |
| Location: Announced: Groundbreaking: Open House: Dedicated: Size: | San Luis Potosí City, San Luis Potosí, Mexico; 3 April 2022 by Russell M. Nelson; 9 March 2024 by Sean Douglas. 24 September-10 October 2026 scheduled for 1 November 2026; 9,300 sq ft (860 m^{2}) on a 3.9-acre (1.6 ha) site |
| 230. Torreón Mexico Temple (Dedication scheduled); Official website; News & images | |
| Location: Announced: Groundbreaking: Open House: Dedicated: Size: | Gómez Palacio, Durango, Mexico; 4 April 2021 by Russell M. Nelson; 10 December 2022 by Hugo Montoya; 22 October to 7 November 2026 scheduled for 22 November 2026; 11,324 sq ft (1,052.0 m^{2}) on a 2.2-acre (0.89 ha) site |
| 241. Querétaro Mexico Temple (Under construction); Official website; News & images | |
| Location: Announced: Groundbreaking: Size: | Querétaro City, Querétaro, Mexico; 4 April 2021 by Russell M. Nelson; 7 January 2023 by Adrian Ochoa; 27,500 sq ft (2,550 m^{2}) on a 3.58-acre (1.45 ha) site |

=== Announced ===
| 294. Cuernavaca Mexico Temple (Groundbreaking scheduled); Official website; News & images | |
| Location: Announced: Groundbreaking: Size: | Cuernavaca, Morelos, Mexico; 2 October 2022 by Russell M. Nelson scheduled for 14 November 2026 by Moisés Villanueva; 19,000 sq ft (1,800 m^{2}) on a 5.36-acre (2.17 ha) site |
| 307. Culiacán Mexico Temple (Site announced); Official website; News & images | |
| Location: Announced: Size: | Culiacán, Sinaloa, Mexico; 3 October 2021 by Russell M. Nelson; 10,000 sq ft (930 m^{2}) on a 5-acre (2.0 ha) site |
| 310. Mexico City Benemérito Mexico Temple (Site announced); Official website; News & images | |
| Location: Announced: Size: | Benemerito, Mexico City, Mexico; 3 April 2022 by Russell M. Nelson; 29,000 sq ft (2,700 m^{2}) on a 8.5-acre (3.4 ha) site |
| 316. Pachuca Mexico Temple (Announced); Official website; News & images | |
| Location: Announced: | Pachuca, Hidalgo, Mexico; 2 October 2022 by Russell M. Nelson |
| 317. Toluca Mexico Temple (Site announced); Official website; News & images | |
| Location: Announced: Size: Notes: | Metepec, State of Mexico, Mexico; 2 October 2022 by Russell M. Nelson; 19,000 sq ft (1,800 m^{2}) on a 4.87-acre (1.97 ha) site Temple site announced on November 20, 2023. |
| 318. Tula Mexico Temple (Announced); Official website; News & images | |
| Location: Announced: | Tula de Allende, Hidalgo, Mexico; 2 October 2022 by Russell M. Nelson |
| 329. Cancún Mexico Temple (Announced); Official website; News & images | |
| Location: Announced: | Cancún, Mexico; 1 October 2023 by Russell M. Nelson |
| 341. Chihuahua Mexico Temple (Site announced); Official website; News & images | |
| Location: Announced: Size: | Chihuahua City, Mexico; 7 April 2024 by Russell M. Nelson; 19,000 sq ft (1,800 m^{2}) on a 5.87-acre (2.38 ha) site |
| 353. Juchitan de Zaragoza Mexico Temple (Announced); Official website; News & images | |
| Location: Announced: | Juchitan de Zaragoza, Mexico; 6 October 2024 by Russell M. Nelson |
| 368. Reynosa Mexico Temple (Announced); Official website; News & images | |
| Location: Announced: | Reynosa, Mexico; 6 April 2025 by Russell M. Nelson |

== Significant members from Mexico ==
- Margarito Bautista, a genealogical missionary from San Miguel de Atlautla, Mexico State and the first branch president of the Temporary Lamanite Branch (later Lucero Ward) in Salt Lake City, Utah.
- Rafael Monroy, who became a martyr of the church in 1915.
- Benjamin de Hoyos, a General Authority Seventy from Monterrey, Nuevo León.
- Agricol Lozano, the first Latino stake president in Mexico and a president of the Mexico City Mexico Temple from Tula, Hidalgo.
- Carl B. Pratt, a General Authority Seventy born in Monterrey, Mexico.
- Octaviano Tenorio, a General Authority Seventy from Tilapan, Veracruz.

== See also ==
- Latino Mormons
- Mexicans of American descent
- Mormon Corridor
- Religion in Mexico
