= Benemerito de las Americas =

Benemerito de las Americas may refer to:

- Benito Juárez, Mexican statesman honored as Benemérito de las Américas by the Congress of the Dominican Republic
- Benemérito de las Américas, a town and one of the 119 Municipalities of Chiapas, in southern Mexico
- Benemerito De Las Americas, a former private high school operated by The Church of Jesus Christ of Latter-Day Saints in Mexico City, which now functions as a Missionary Training Center for that church
