= Hotel Roberts (Provo, Utah) =

- Formerly listed on the U.S. National Register of Historic Places
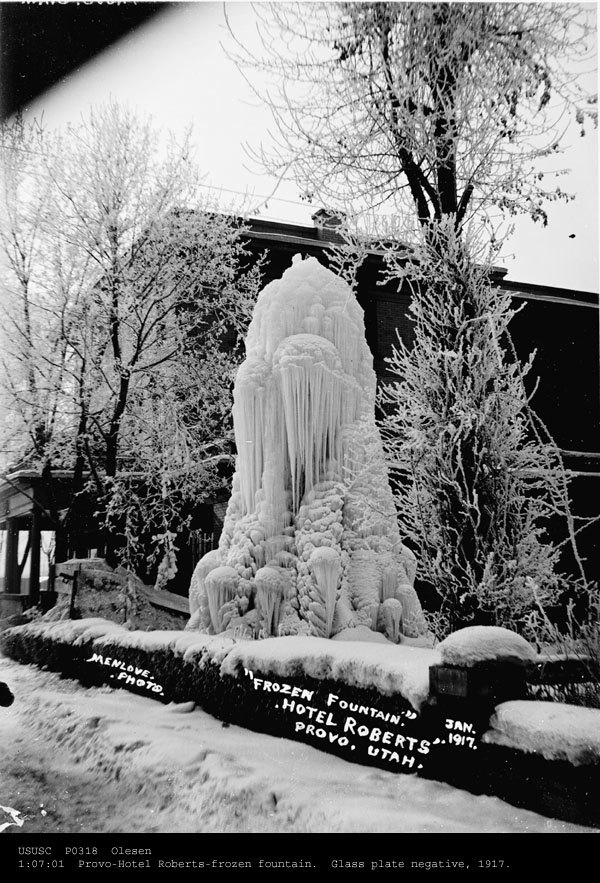
- Frozen fountain in the central courtyard of Hotel Roberts, January 1917
- Location: 192 South University Avenue (US-189); Provo, Utah; United States
- Built: 1882
- Architectural style: Mission Revival Style architecture
- NRHP reference No.: 79002516

Significant dates
- Added to NRHP: July 26, 1979
- Removed from NRHP: April 28, 2005

Hotel Roberts was a historic hotel located in central Provo, Utah, United States, that was formerly listed on the National Register of Historic Places. It was built in 1882 and known as a luxury location, but gradually deteriorated over time and was demolished in 2004.

== Description ==
The former hotel, which was built in 1882, was located at 192 South University Avenue (US-189). The Mission-style hotel was a famous landmark and a center of Provo social activity for much of the early 20th century. Following its construction, Hotel Roberts was considered "the most luxurious hotel in the Utah Territory." It also served briefly as the Language Training Mission (now called the Missionary Training Center) for the Church of Jesus Christ of Latter-day Saints (the Church).

In December 1919 the hotel was purchased by Mark Anderson who would later serve as Mayor of Provo and the namesake of the Provo power plant, "The Mark Anderson Utility Center." The hotel remained in the family for many years and was run by Anderson's son, Mark Anderson Jr, until he retired in 1995 at the age of 76 when the family sold the hotel because the upkeep was too much.

In later years, Hotel Roberts fell into serious disrepair, with profound structural and water damage, and was largely known as a residence for transients. Neglect by the owners and lack of community support to maintain the building led to its demolition in November 2004.

The hotel had been added to the National Register of Historic Places July 26, 1979, but was removed on April 28, 2005.

In December 2010 the nearby Provo Tabernacle (located a block to the north and was built one year after the construction of the Hotel Roberts) was nearly completely destroyed by a fire. That structure was later refurbished into the Church's Provo City Center Temple. The site of the former hotel was sold to the Church and became the southernmost part of the grounds of the temple, with a single-level parking garage built below ground level.

== See also ==
- National Register of Historic Places listings in Utah County, Utah
