= Desideria Quintanar de Yáñez =

Desideria Quintanar de Yáñez (1814–1893) was the first woman baptized into the Church of Jesus Christ of Latter-day Saints (LDS Church) in Mexico.

== Family life ==
Desideria Quintanar was born in 1814 in Nopala, Hidalgo, Mexico. She married Rafael Yáñez and had three children: José María, Manuel, and Tereza. Her livelihood was that of providing for her family by growing maize and legumes. Between 1840 and 1850, her family prospered financially; they owned several properties in San Sebastián, a town in Nopala and close to Veracruz, where they raised goats, sheep, and other livestock. She lived through the reign of the emperor Maximillian I. Her son, José María, had fought in the anti-monarchical army as a commander against the French intervention in Mexico in the 1860s in Hidalgo. Desideria was eventually widowed. She died in 1893 at the age of 79.

== Baptism into the LDS Church ==
In February 1880, Desideria had a dream about a pamphlet called "Una Voz de Amonestación" being published by foreigners in Mexico City. Missionaries from LDS Church were, in fact, in Mexico City in the process of publishing a Spanish translation of Parley P. Pratt's pamphlet, "A Voice of Warning," which contained introductory information to the Church. This dream had a great effect on her, and she felt very strongly that this pamphlet would help her spiritually. Because of poor health, she was unable to travel to Mexico City to investigate the veracity of her dream. Her son, José María, went in her place, and was able to meet the apostle Moses Thatcher and other missionaries that had accompanied him, including a Spaniard, Melitón González Trejo, who had assisted in the translation of Church materials into Spanish, and James Z. Stewart. José María returned to the village where his mother lived with news of the foreign missionaries and their pamphlet. Since "A Voice of Warning" was still being translated (in part by Plotino Rhodakanaty, a Greek convert living in Mexico City), the missionaries sent other pamphlets back with José María.

In 1880, Desideria received the translated "A Voice of Warning," as well as the newly published Spanish translation of selections from Book of Mormon. Desideria was baptized by Melitón González Trejo into LDS Church in April 1880 in her village of Nopala. She was the 22nd person to be baptized into the Church in Mexico, as well as the first woman. Her oldest son, José María and his wife, as well his daughter, Carmen, were also baptized that day.

In the following months, various other family members were baptized into the LDS Church and a small congregation, called a branch, was established in Nopala. José María was ordained as its bishop. However, the LDS Church was facing difficulties regarding plural marriage back in the United States, and as a result, fewer missionaries were sent to Mexico. Because of the lack of contact with American missionaries, the small congregation in Nopala struggled, and its bishop, still José María, ended up renouncing his priesthood. In 1886, Desideria was severely beaten and robbed in her home. Apostle Erastus Snow gave her a blessing while he visited Mexico on church business. Snow was interested to learn that Desideria was a descendant of Cuauhtémoc, and saw Desideria's conversion as fulfilling the Book of Mormon prophecy to show the "great things the Lord hath done for their fathers" to the "remnant of the House of Israel."

In 1886, the entire Book of Mormon was translated into Spanish, and the Mexico mission president at the time, Horace Cummings, mentioned this to Desideria. Desideria was anxious to receive it, so Cummings sent for an unbound volume, which she was "much pleased" with. When missionaries returned to Nopala in 1903, José María explained that his mother had died completely faithful in the LDS Church, even though others had left the church.
