= Missionary Training Center =

Religious training centers operated by The Church of Jesus Christ of Latter-day Saints

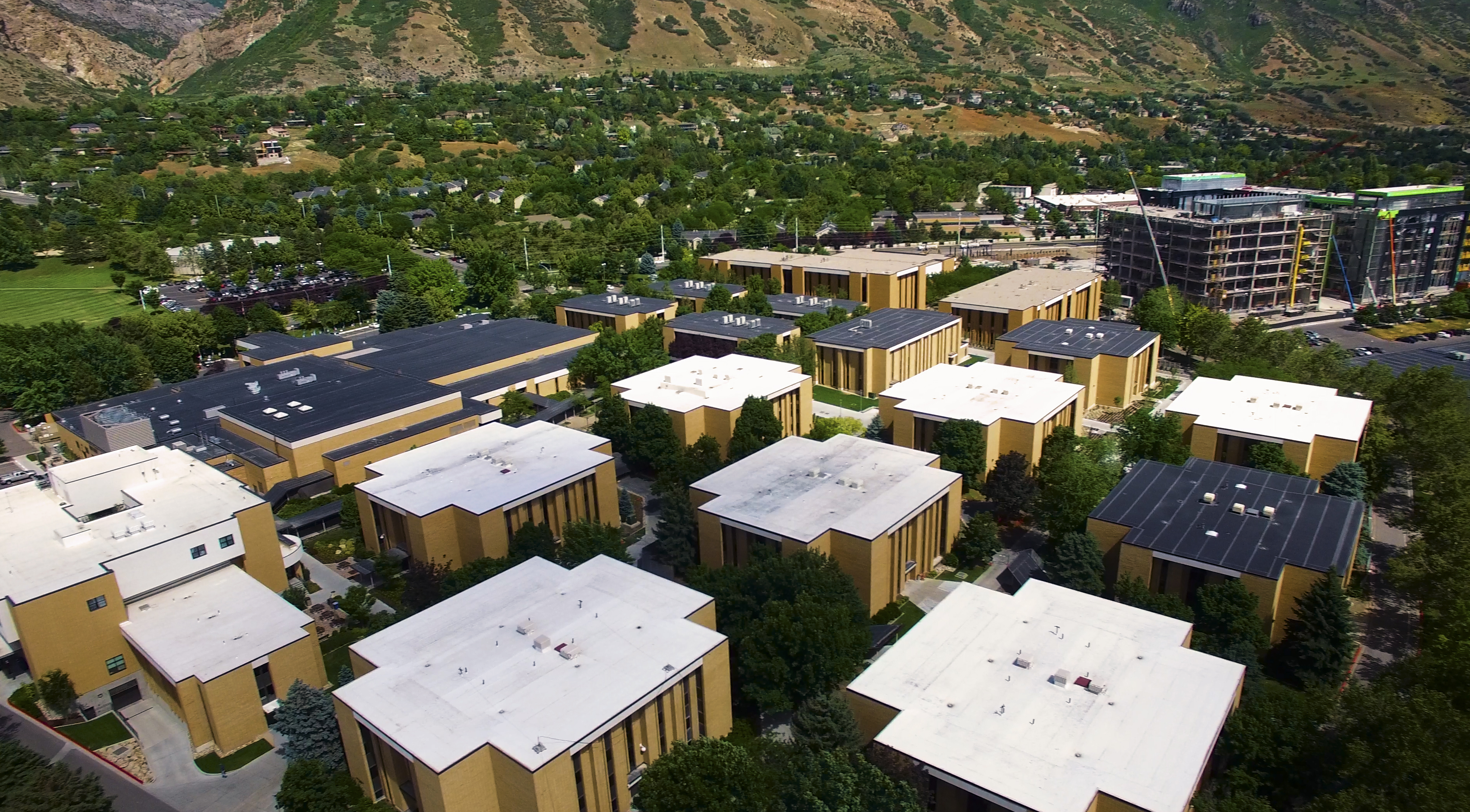
- The Provo Missionary Training Center
- Built: 1978; 48 years ago
- Location: 2005 North 900 East Provo, Utah, United States
- Buildings: 19
- Area: 39 acres (16 ha)
- Owner: The Church of Jesus Christ of Latter-day Saints

Missionary Training Centers (MTC) are centers devoted to training missionaries for the Church of Jesus Christ of Latter-day Saints (LDS Church). The flagship MTC is located in Provo, Utah, adjacent to the campus of Brigham Young University (BYU), a private university owned and operated by the church.

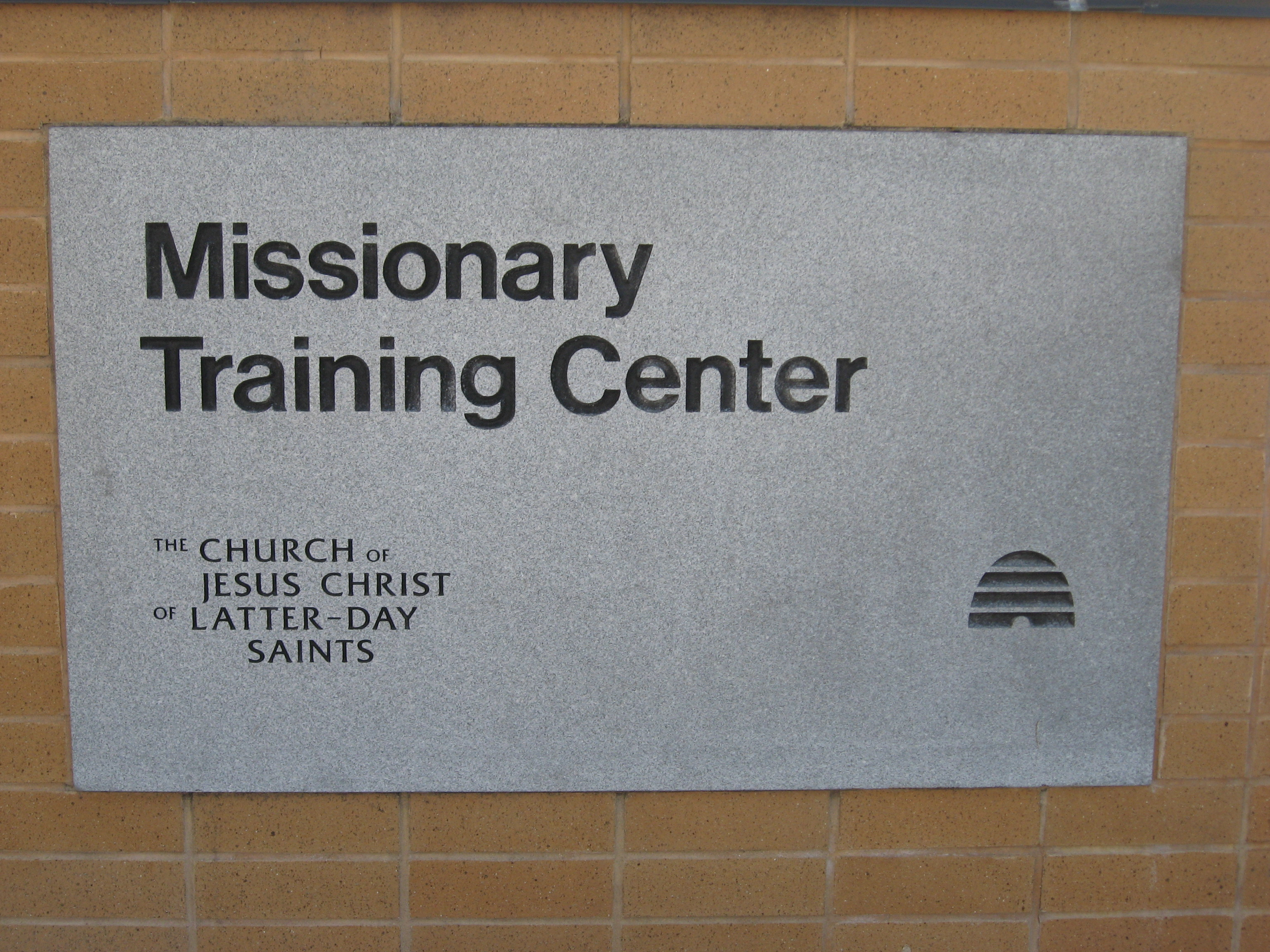
Sign near entrance at Provo MTC

At the beginning of their service, missionaries usually spend 3 to 9 weeks at an MTC where they receive training in doctrine, conduct, proselyting methods, and, when required, a new language. As of July 2023, in addition to Provo, there are 9 MTCs throughout the world, in Brazil, England, Ghana, Mexico, New Zealand, Peru, the Philippines, and South Africa. Missionaries serve in 150 countries teaching in 60 different languages around the world.

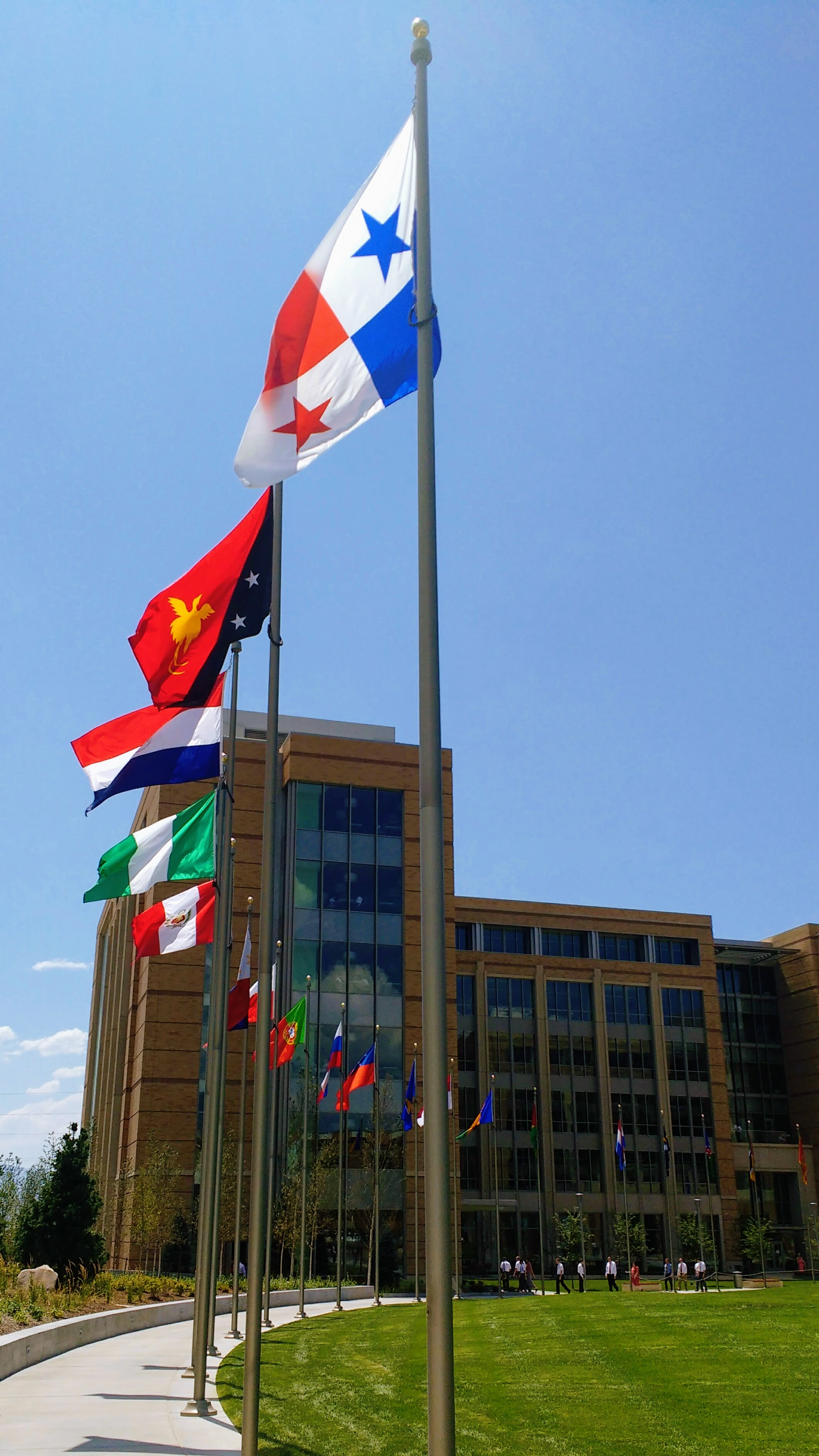
Flags at the MTC

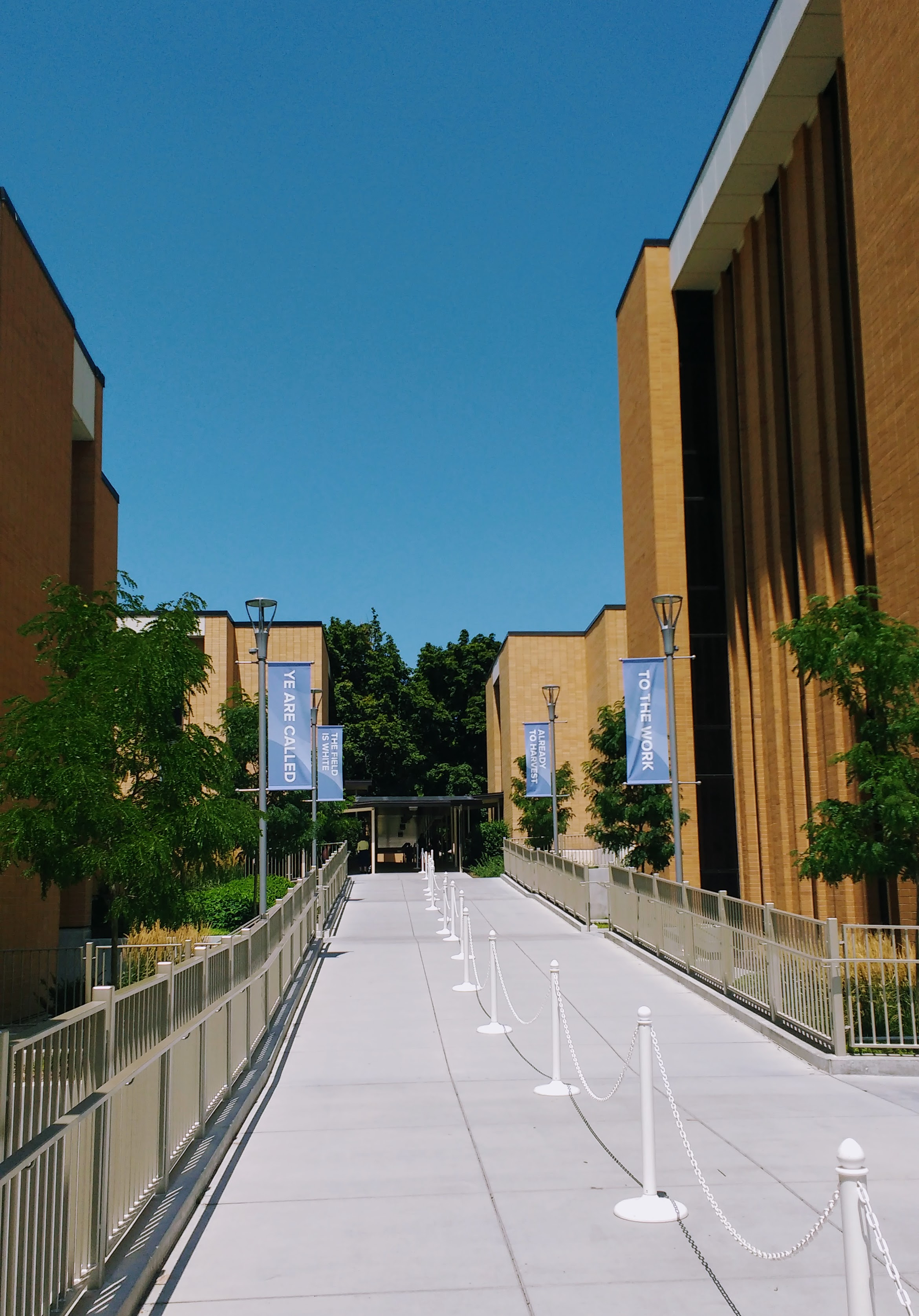
MTC

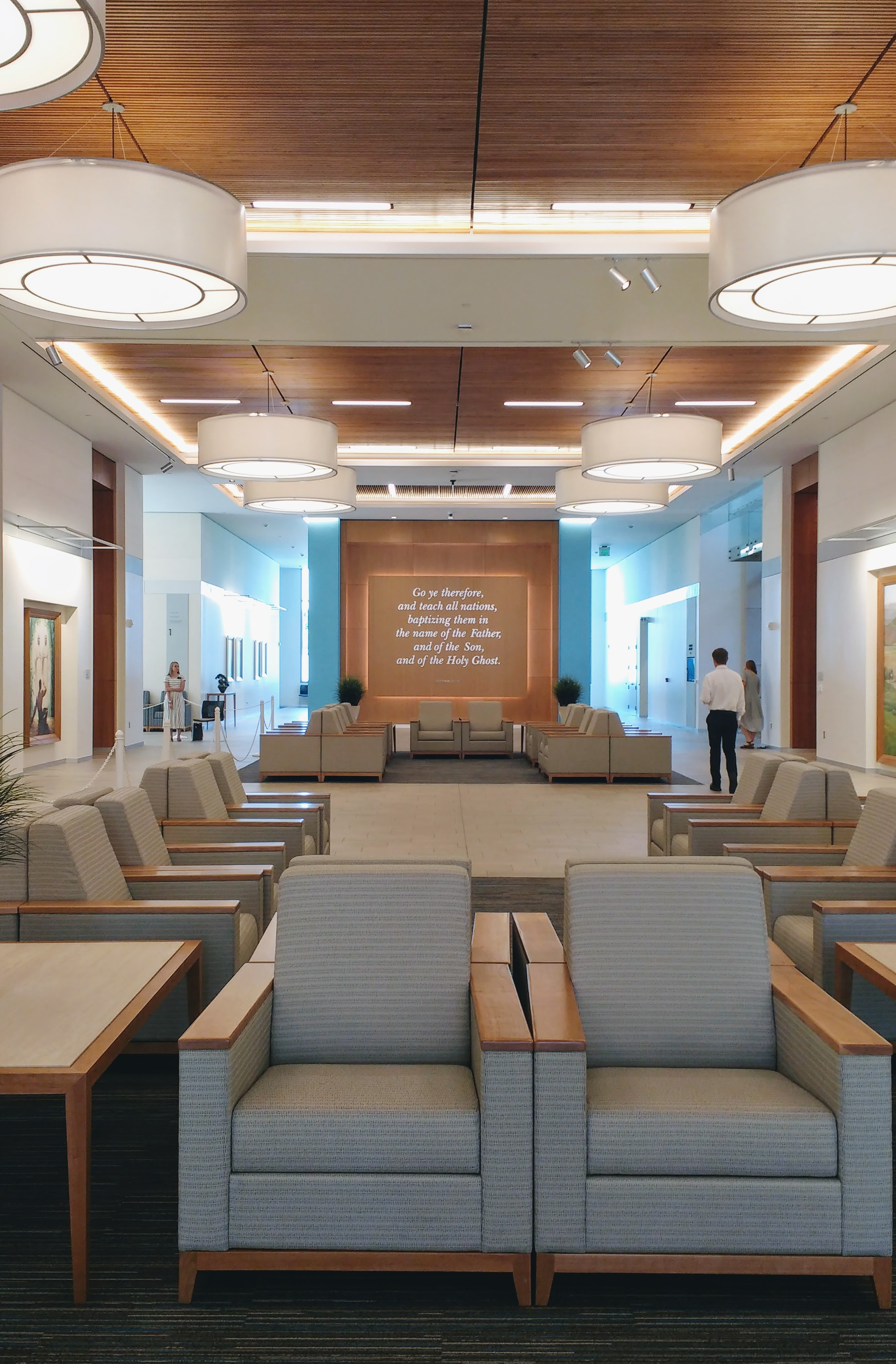
Inside the MTC

New missionaries assigned to the Provo MTC arrive Monday–Wednesday (couple missionaries on Monday, international arrivals on Tuesday, U.S. and Canada on Wednesday), at which point they begin using their titles of "Elder" (men) and "Sister" (women). They are assigned companions and organized into districts and branches. During their training, the elders and sisters will spend the majority of their time in class, with breaks for meals, church services, temple attendance, fitness activities, service projects, and personal preparation time (for laundry, letter writing, etc.).

Missionaries have historically been given at least three weeks of training in proselyting methods. This includes lessons on church doctrine and teaching, mission rules, and proper interactions with the people they will serve, teach, and work with in their assigned missions. Missionaries are also encouraged to use their time outside class to actively study church scriptures and doctrine, and a language if necessary. Missionaries study and learn from a manual called “Preach My Gospel: A Guide to Sharing the Gospel of Jesus Christ" which is a 2023 second edition to the original “Preach My Gospel: A Guide to Missionary Work” originally published in 2004. The new edition includes information about using technology, social media, and teaching online. It also emphasizes Jesus Christ more and provides more clarity about covenants and his doctrine.

In many cases, missionaries who already speak the language of their assigned area are sent to their mission after four weeks. Other missionaries may spend as many as nine additional weeks in language training. The MTC language programs encourage a full immersion experience with the motto "SYL," for "Speak Your Language." In some cases, missionaries learning foreign languages go directly to the MTC in the country where they are called to serve. This depends on the capacity of the MTC in the area.

Each MTC is directed by a mission president, just like each of the 400+ missions worldwide. Classes in the MTC are typically taught by returned (former) missionaries. The missionaries are also assigned to small congregations called branches, which are led by local church members called to serve in the MTC.

== History of the MTC ==
The MTC was originally started by LDS Church after some of its missionaries were stranded in the United States due to difficulties in obtaining passport visas to other countries. Diplomatic relations between the United States and other countries where missionaries served became strained, limiting the number of missionaries serving in those areas. Often these missionaries would simply be reassigned to another area, but as the number of missionaries grew this became more of a problem.

=== Salt Lake Mission Home ===
The missionary experience prior to the opening of the MTC was quite different from that established later. In 1925, a small building adjacent to Temple Square in downtown Salt Lake City had a dormitory for brand new missionaries. Missionaries arriving here would then be set apart to their missionary service by a member of the Quorum of the Twelve Apostles. Often, they would even be interviewed by these apostles during this time and attend a service in the Salt Lake Temple, staying just a day or two before leaving to their assigned areas. Missionaries who had difficulty trying to get to their assigned areas would then either serve as tour guides on Temple Square or do clerical tasks at church headquarters.

In 1971, the old Lafayette School at 75 East North Temple Street was converted into the new Salt Lake Mission Home, and English-speaking missionaries would arrive on a Saturday and leave the following Wednesday or Thursday. The MTC in Provo replaced this in the fall of 1978 for English-speaking missionaries.

=== BYU ===
In part to keep the missionaries occupied while they were waiting for their visas, many of these missionaries were enrolled in courses at BYU. As language instruction was considered essential, most of these missionaries were enrolled in courses to learn the languages of the areas where they would be serving.

This proved to be problematic, however, as missionaries would arrive and depart at random intervals throughout the year as they accepted missionary assignments or as the visa paperwork was completed and approved by the country they were trying to get into. This did not fit well within the semester system for the rest of the BYU students, and eventually required professors that were dedicated strictly to teaching missionaries instead of the traditional university students.

A permanent organization was needed to cope with the needs of these missionaries.

=== Language Training Mission ===
By November 1961, missionaries gathered at the Hotel Roberts in downtown Provo under the direction of Ernest J. Wilkins, a professor of Spanish in the BYU Languages Department. Around 1964, the activities were moved to Amanda Knight Hall and Knight-Mangum Hall, buildings on the lower campus of BYU, which were reserved exclusively for the training of missionaries. A new church mission, the Language Training Mission (LTM), was created with its own mission presidency and organization, with the geographic extent of the mission to be the perimeter of the building. This building included dormitories as well as classrooms for the missionaries. Eventually, other buildings on the campus of BYU were also used for missionary training activities.

The church constructed and operated a large LTM in Laie, Hawaii. Through the 1970s, the Hawaiian LTM received missionaries from around the world who were preparing to serve as missionaries in the Asia Pacific regions, including Taiwan, Hong Kong, and Polynesia.

Instructors for the LTM were employed by BYU. Sometimes these were full-time professors from the university, but more often they were teaching assistants or university students who had skills in the languages being taught. In many cases, instructors were former missionaries who had just returned from the areas where the missionaries in the LTM were to be sent. Curriculum was still planned directly by the foreign language departments at BYU, in coordination with the LTM mission presidency.

In the beginning, the LTM was intended to be a temporary place for those missionaries who were having visa difficulties. However, mission presidents who received visa-delayed missionaries started to notice a significant improvement in their proselytizing skills over similar missionaries who were able to get their visas almost immediately. It was estimated that even a few weeks of intensive language training at the beginning could save almost a full year's worth of effort trying to learn the language "on the streets." Mission presidents soon asked church headquarters to have all the missionaries, regardless of their visa status, attend language training before their departure.

During this expansion of the LTM's role, additional types of instruction were added to the curriculum, including leadership training and basic instructor training. After several years of language and general missionary skills training, the mission presidents serving in English-speaking areas were requesting their missionaries also have the opportunity to take additional classes taught at the LTM. With an overall increase in missionaries serving, as well as a large number of missionaries who would be attending the LTM due to program changes, plans were made to move the whole mission to another location.

=== Provo MTC ===
At about the same time the Provo Temple was built, the church acquired some nearby land which was originally slated for expansion of the BYU campus. This land was used to build four dormitories, a gymnasium, and a language training building. The name of the LTM was changed to the MTC in 1978, to note that it was for more than just language training, although it would continue to be a significant feature of the facility. The Salt Lake Mission Home was closed, and all remaining functions of that facility were merged into the MTC, including administrative functions that were not otherwise handled directly by church headquarters.

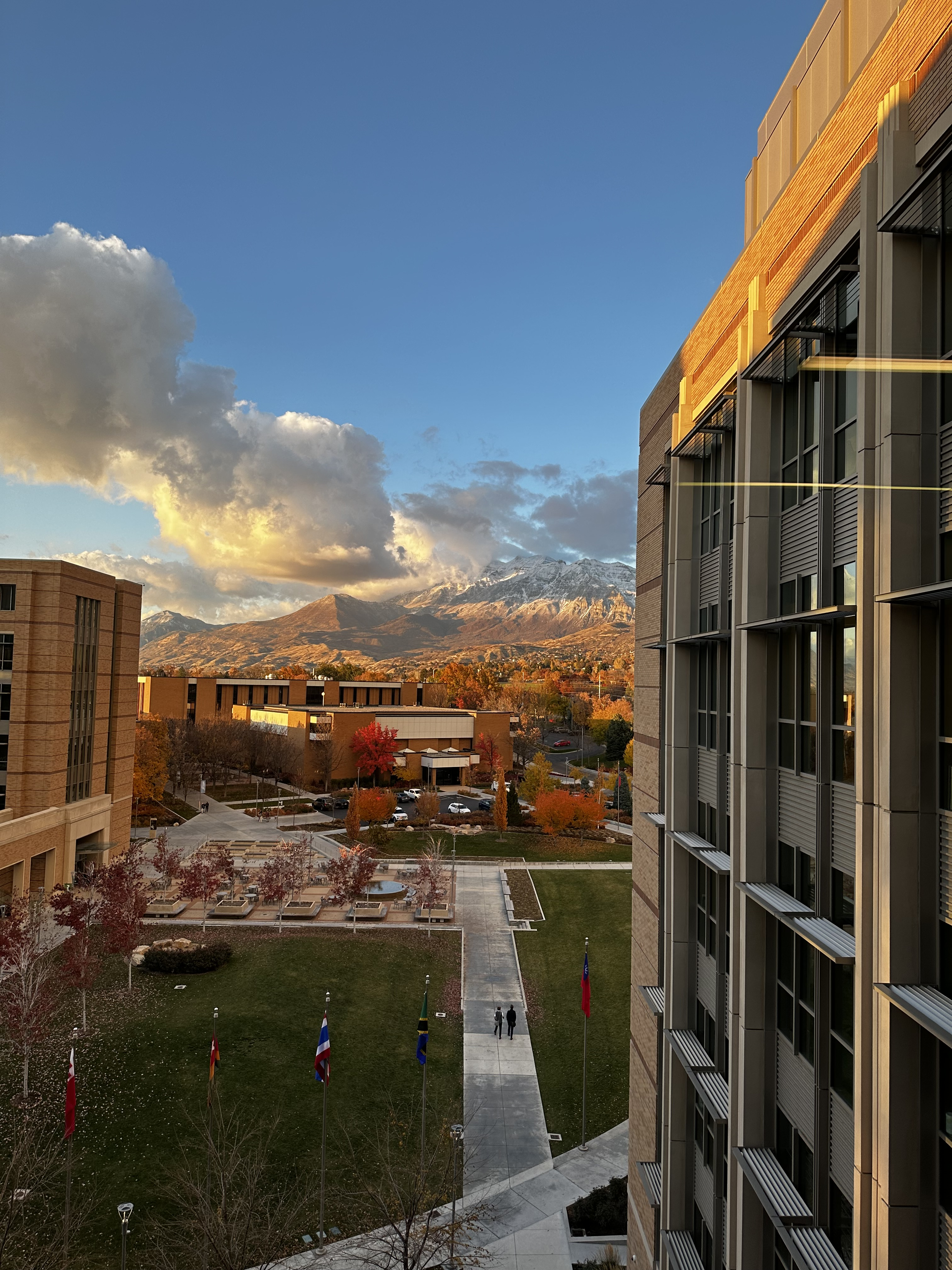
A view of the Provo MTC campus at sunset.

Due to the growth of the church, the number of buildings and the size of the main administrative building were expanded to cope with the increased activity at the Provo MTC campus. Ultimately, even this growth could no longer be accommodated and it became apparent the church would need to build training centers in places other than Provo.

=== MTCs around the world ===
With the growth of the LDS Church outside the United States, it soon became almost impossible for missionaries living outside the United States to be able to come to Provo and attend the MTC, both for financial reasons as well as for visa difficulties. Just as it had been a problem for American missionaries to obtain visas to go abroad, it became difficult for church members without American citizenship to come to Utah, often for the same reasons.

After the development of the ecclesiastical areas as a level of administration in the church's hierarchy, area presidents outside North America were authorized to establish independent MTCs for members living within the area. This removed most international travel requirements for many missionaries, especially for missionaries who spoke the language of their own country and were able to serve locally.

One of the first of these missionary training centers was established in 1977 in São Paulo, Brazil, adjacent to the newly dedicated São Paulo Brazil Temple. The church constructed a new building in the Casa Verde neighborhood of São Paulo. The Brazil MTC building has a maximum capacity of 646.

As the number of missionaries coming from North America grew, it was decided to send many of the missionaries directly to areas where they would soon be serving, if there was a local MTC capable of servicing them. This has allowed the growth of MTCs outside the U.S. instead of building another MTC campus in North America. Missionaries from North America who have visa difficulties still attend the Provo MTC first, and often serve temporarily in areas of the United States while awaiting visas. Missionaries from countries outside the U.S. where there is not an MTC in their own country attend in a country closest to them.

The England MTC was transferred from London to Preston after the completion of the temple site in 1998. The former London MTC buildings are now used for other church purposes.

Africa has MTCs in Ghana and South Africa. The Ghana MTC was built first because of the rapid growth of the church in West Africa and the need for more missionaries there. The Ghana MTC in Tema was dedicated on May 17, 2002. Although it was only able to support 90 missionaries, it was the bigger than the South Africa MTC. Because of the rapid growth of the church in Africa, in August 2017, a bigger capacity MTC was built to accommodate up to 500 missionaries next to the Accra Ghana Temple to serve most of Africa. The South Africa MTC was opened on July 24, 2003, with only 14 missionaries. It is the smallest MTC in the world with a capacity of 38 missionaries. The MTC shares a building with the South Africa Johannesburg Mission. The MTC reached a milestone of 1,000 total intakes in 2009.

A private high school operated by the church in Mexico City, known as Benemerito De Las Americas, was permanently closed at the end of the 2012–13 term, and the Mexico City MTC was relocated there, opening June 26, 2013. This greatly expanded the capacity of the Mexico City MTC, such that it is second in size only to the Provo MTC: the old building near the México City México Temple could accommodate 125 missionaries at a time, while the new 90-acre campus can handle over 1,000.

Following a church announcement on March 29, 2018, the MTCs in Santiago, Chile and Madrid, Spain closed in January 2019. The announcement stated that "this decision comes as Church leaders continue to seek the best use of resources worldwide according to the needs and demands of each area." Citing the same reasons, the church announced on December 12, 2018, that the MTC in the Dominican Republic would also close in January 2019. As of February 2019, with these closures, there were 12 MTCs around the world. On February 8, 2019, the church announced that the MTC in Buenos Aires, Argentina would close in July 2019. The announcement noted part of the reason would be to more effectively use the MTCs in Mexico and Brazil. A similar announcement that the Guatemala MTC would close in January 2020 was made on September 19, 2019.

== Provo MTC ==
The MTC in Provo, Utah, is still the largest and can accommodate up to 3,700 missionaries. The facility includes a large gymnasium, cafeterias, a medical clinic, a bookstore, a mail center, a call center, laundry facilities, classrooms, meetinghouses, and residence halls. Approximately 55 languages are taught at the Provo MTC.

=== Training services ===
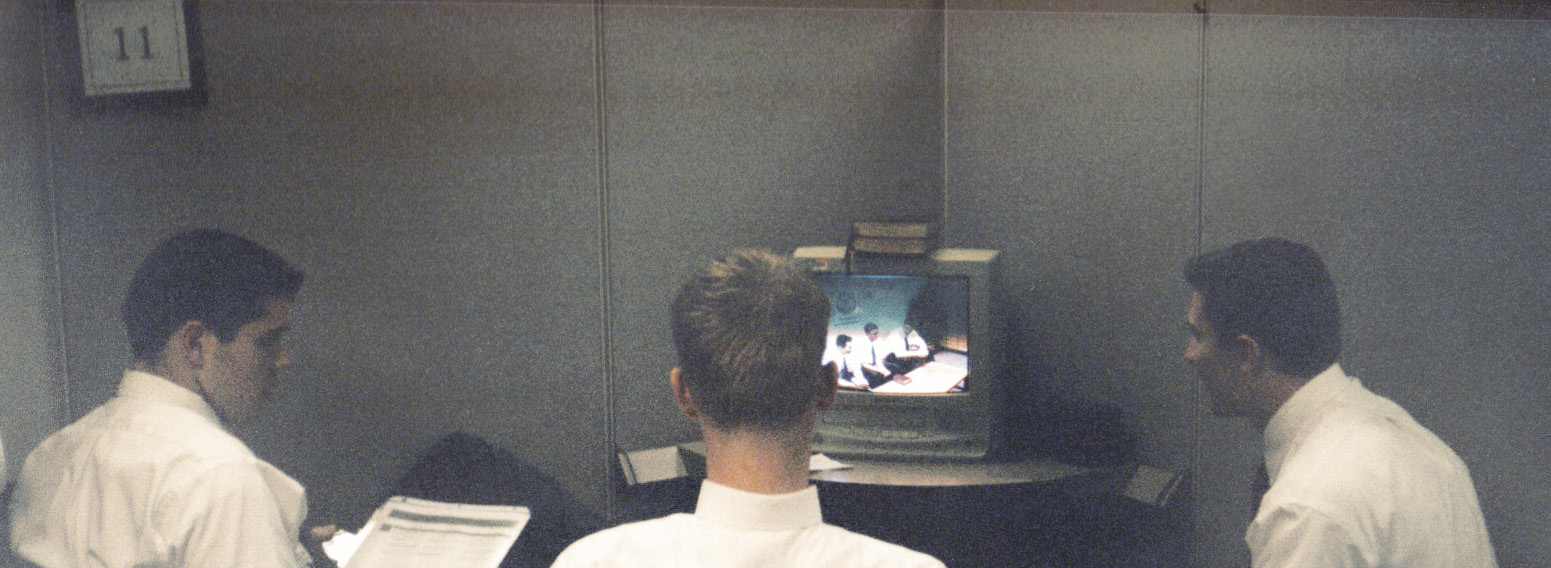
Missionaries review a mock teaching session in the TRC.

Previously called TRC (Teaching Resource Center), the Helping Others department gives missionaries experience teaching in their mission language, even if it is their native tongue. All missionaries visit the training services each week. Helping Others Actors who speak the language portray "people being taught" (people who are interested in the church) in these teaching situations.

Actors are usually returned missionaries and/or BYU students with language abilities. Members of other faiths are able to work as actors as well.

== List of MTCs ==
As of August 2024, there are 11 MTCs throughout the world.

- São Paulo, Brazil
- Kinshasa, Democratic Republic of the Congo
- Preston, England, United Kingdom
- Accra, Ghana
- Mexico City, Mexico
- Auckland, New Zealand
- Lima, Peru
- Manila, Philippines
- Johannesburg, South Africa
- Bangkok, Thailand
- Provo, Utah, United States

In addition, the Church operates the India Service Support Center in Hyderabad, India. The Church has not published details about this center, but in 2023, its new president and his wife attended the Seminar for New MTC Leaders, so it appears that it is considered an MTC of sorts.

=== List of closed MTCs ===
In 2010, the New Zealand MTC moved from Hamilton to Auckland. The previously open MTCs in Tokyo and Seoul have closed. Following a church announcement on March 29, 2018, the MTCs in Santiago, Chile and Madrid, Spain closed in January 2019. On December 12, 2018, the church announced the MTC in Santo Domingo, Dominican Republic would also close in January 2019. Following an initial announcement on February 8, 2019, the MTC in Buenos Aires, Argentina closed in July 2019. On September 19, 2019, the church announced it will close the MTC in Guatemala in January 2020.

- Tokyo, Japan (1979–2009)
- Seoul, South Korea (1986-2013)
- Hamilton, New Zealand (est. 1977, relocated to Auckland 2010)
- Santiago, Chile (1981–2019)
- Madrid, Spain (1999–2019)
- Santo Domingo, Dominican Republic (2000–2019)
- Buenos Aires, Argentina (2000–2019)
- Guatemala City, Guatemala (1986–2020)
- Bogotá, Colombia (1992–2023)
