= Latino Mormons =

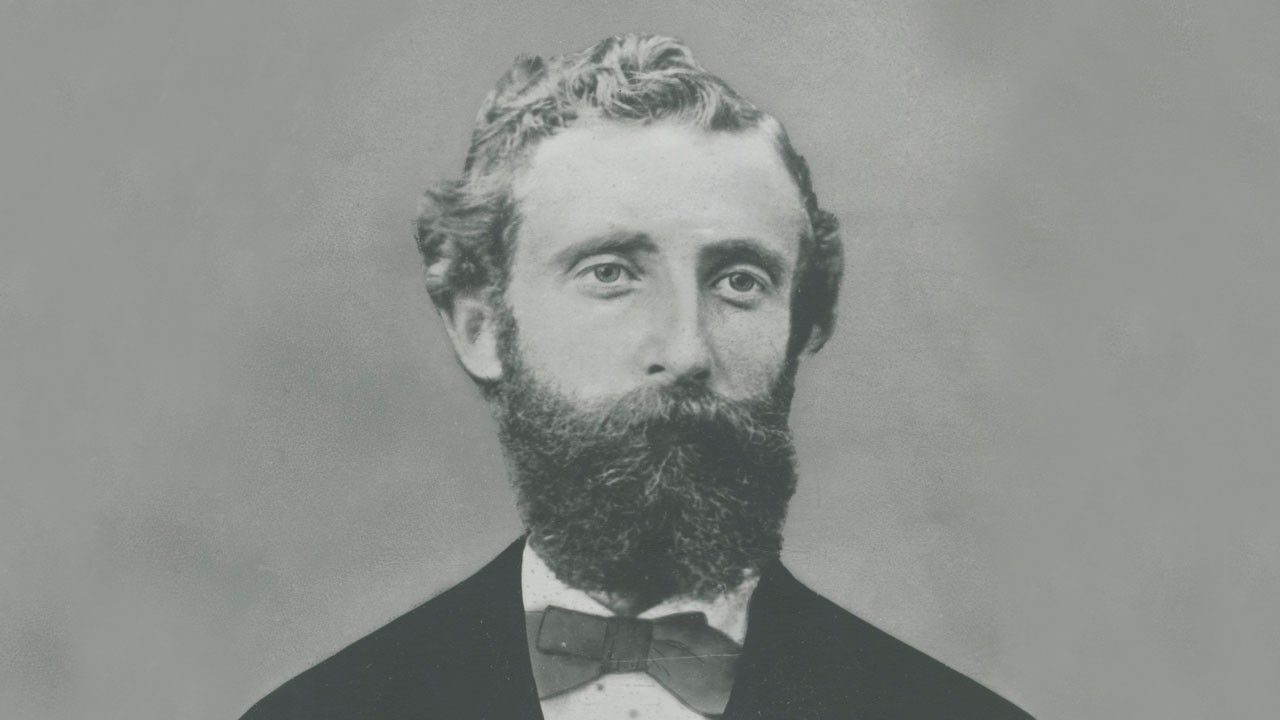
Meliton Gonzales Trejo, an original contributor to the translation of the Book of Mormon into Spanish.

Latino Mormons are members of The Church of Jesus Christ of Latter-Day Saints who are of Latino or Hispanic descent. Beginning with an initial, partial translation of the Book of Mormon into Spanish by Melitón Gonzáles Trejo in 1875, missionary efforts have been active and ongoing among most Latino populations. In September 2000, the Church reported more non-English-speaking members than English-speaking members, with Spanish and Portuguese comprising the second and third-most popular languages. In 2023, the Church reported that Mexico had the largest membership outside the US, with nearly 1.5 million members, with Brazil, at around 1.46 million, close behind. In the United States, around 12% of church members are Latino.

== History ==
=== Early Latino membership ===
The presence of Latino members in the LDS Church dates back to the late 19th century, when missionary efforts reached Mexico and the southwestern United States. Other instances of contact between early members and native Spanish-speaking populations include the Mormon Battalion of the late 1840s, but it appears lasting contact was minimal. In June 1874, Brigham Young inquired Daniel Webster Jones and Henry Brizee, both Spanish speakers, with intentions of translating the Book of Mormon into Spanish. Jones and the aforementioned Trejo worked together to translate the Book of Mormon from 1874 to 1875, printing one hundred copies and then embarking for an exploration of Arizona and a mission to Mexico. The first native Spanish-speaking converts to the church were baptized in Hermosillo in 1877, with a branch of the church being formed thereafter in 1879. Growth in the church among Latinos primarily remained in Mexico and the fringes of Central America until the 1920s, when efforts to evangelize were made in Argentina and Brazil.

One notable early event in Latino Latter-day Saint history was the execution of Rafael Monroy and Vicente Morales in July 1915. Monroy, the branch president in San Marcos, Hidalgo, and Morales, his first counselor, were arrested and executed by soldiers in Emiliano Zapata's revolutionary army. While the exact motives remain debated, their religious affiliation, middle-class status, and association with Americans were contributing factors. Their deaths became symbolic within the Church community, often remembered as acts of faith and dedication under persecution.

Within the state of Utah, some evidence of contact exists between Hispanics and the LDS community during the end of the 19th century. Individuals with Spanish surnames performed livestock operations for individual members as well as for church-owned flocks in southern Utah. By the 1920s, a substantial population of Hispanics had developed in the town of Monticello, Utah, and a June, 1920 report in the Salt Lake Tribune makes mention of a considerable community of Mexicans in Garland.

Following the Mexican Revolution of 1910, many Mexicans fled north to escape conflict. The 1920 Utah census reported a nearly 5,700% increase in Mexicans from the census taken in 1890, in which only 19 Mexicans were reported to be living in Utah. This growth in the Utah Hispanic population led to a large number of converts to the Latter-day Saint faith, very few of which spoke English. As a result, several members petitioned the leadership of the church to hold meetings in Spanish. The first meeting, with 19 members and 33 non-members, was held in a restaurant owned by a member in April 1921. In May 1923, the Salt Lake Mexican Branch of the church was established. This is one of several reported origin stories (some argue the first Spanish-speaking unit was formed in Mesa, Arizona, or El Paso, Texas) of the now-common language branches and wards found throughout the church in both the United States and beyond.

=== Post-War membership boom ===
Following World War II, the church began a concerted effort to expand missionary work to much of central and South America. In the decade immediately following the end of the war, nine more countries (Costa Rica in 1946, El Salvador and Uruguay in 1948, Paraguay in 1949, Honduras in 1952, Nicaragua in 1953, and Guatemala, Chile, and Peru in 1956) saw the establishment of congregations and missionary work. five more followed in the 1960s, including Bolivia, Panama, Ecuador, Colombia, and Venezuela. By 1978, when missionary efforts opened in the Dominican Republic, all Spanish and Portuguese-speaking countries (with the exception of Cuba) had been opened for proselytizing.

This growth led to the creation of several temples in Latin America. The first temple in the region was erected in 1978, in São Paulo. The 1980s saw a large expansion in temple construction, with new temples being built in Santiago, Mexico City, Guatemala City, Lima, and Buenos Aires. This growth provided a large base of Mormon Latinos - some of which came to the United States and fused with foreign language programs upon arrival. Mormon Latinos also began to take places of prominent importance within the leadership of the church. In the April 1981 general conference, Elder Ángel Abrea was sustained to the First Quorum of the Seventy. Abrea, a native of Argentina, became the first General Authority from Latin America. A news release from the church notes that "at the time of that monumental call, the 47-year-old Elder Abrea was serving as a mission president and had already been called to preside over the soon-to-be-built Buenos Aires Argentina Temple." Abrea died in February 2021. Another defining point in the Latino growth of the church is the appointment of Elder Ulisses Soares as the first Latin American apostle of the church in April 2018. Soares, a Brazilian, marked just the second apostle in nearly a century to have been born outside the United States.

=== Modern developments ===
Between the year 2000 and 2010, due to a large influx of immigration to the United States, the number of Spanish-language wards in the country doubled. Many factors are likely to have contributed to this growth, with Jorge Iber, author of Hispanics in the Mormon Zion, having been quoted as saying, "where else can an individual newly arrived from Central or South America instantly connect with a powerful institution by embracing their spiritual beliefs?" Such statements align with estimations that around 70% of all Latino converts in the United States from 1994 to 2009 were undocumented immigrants.

Additionally, the church has engaged in outreach and community efforts within the Latino community. Since 2002, the church has held an annual program called "Luz de las Naciones," or "Light of the Nations," featuring performances (and performers) representing dozens of Latin American countries.

== Struggle for acceptance ==
Despite this large growth in membership and congregation numbers, Latino Mormons still struggle with a feeling of "otherness" within the context of the larger Latter-day Saint community. From the days of largely-Anglo Mormon colonies in Northern Mexico, a cultural schism has existed between white members of the church and nonwhites. This separation has continued to the present day, as can be seen with the existence of a variety of foreign-language wards and branches within the United States, though some argue that this separation as currently constituted represents the best presently-available option for a church with a growing quantity of ethnic and linguistic diversity. Some contend that, despite the ability of the church to present itself as a haven from the difficulties of their life situations, racial and social hierarchies have often served to stymie the potential personal growth that could have sprung from such a space.

In the late 1900s, the church as a whole underwent a significant administrative overhaul due to a large influx of former businessmen serving in leadership positions. This led to an increased focus on a numbers-driven approach to the functions of the church. As a result, some have noted an increased focus on the nuclear family within church settings, contrasting with uniquely Mormon doctrines (which are pointedly cherished by Latino members) such as eternal extended families and the community of Zion. Although not without positive impact, some argue that this focus has had a demeaning effect on the community-based mindset that is often associated with Latino congregations in the church, resulting in a minimization of the possibilities offered by church programs and outreach efforts for these individuals.

Within the larger Mormon community, Latinos, among members of other ethnic backgrounds, have been fighting for inclusion within a church whose views on race relations have historically been exclusionary. The church has made several recent pronouncements calling for an end to racism, a plea to aid those in need regardless of immigration status, and a recognition of the effects of previous policies and practices that go against modern church teachings of equality. Many see this change and modernization of the church as a positive adjustment, allowing for an expanding view of what constitutes "proper" Mormon behavior and conduct, and a possible opportunity to deviate from the frequently-unfavorable public perception of Latter-Day Saints.

Additionally, church efforts in recent years seem to point towards an increased effort to promote equality and community. Changes such as the switch from home and visiting teaching programs to a ministering program appear to some members to be a shift away from the data-driven focus of the church to a more empathetic form of outreach.
