= Rafael Monroy =

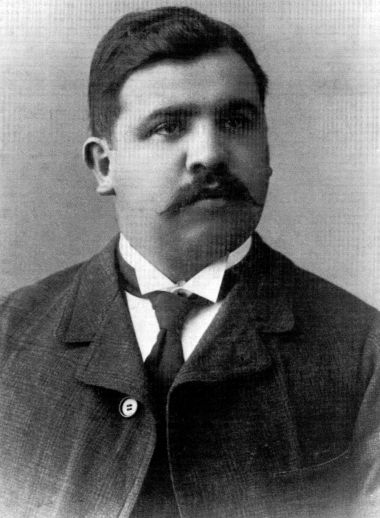

Personal details
- Born: Rafael Monroy Mera; October 21, 1878; Hidalgo, Mexico
- Died: July 15, 1915 (aged 36); Hidalgo, Mexico
- Cause of death: Execution by firing squad
- Occupation: Merchant, landowner
- Spouse(s): Guadalupe Hernández de Monroy

Rafael Monroy Mera (October 21, 1878 – July 15, 1915) was an early member of the Church of Jesus Christ of Latter-day Saints (LDS Church) in Mexico. He served as president of the branch of the church in the town of San Marcos, Hidalgo for a period of two years, and was one of two Mormon men killed by the Liberation Army of the South (Zapatistas) during the Mexican Revolution in 1915 for refusing to renounce his faith and for his association with foreigners. Monroy had joined the church just two years prior in 1913, and was made president of his branch upon the departure of missionaries of American citizenship later that same year due to the growing anti-American sentiment during the Revolution. The Monroy family was well-respected and well-known in the region until their conversion to the LDS faith in 1913, at which point many of the villagers began to turn against Rafael and his family.

== Early life ==
Monroy made his living as a merchant and landowner, and his family owned a store in their village of San Marcos, Hidalgo. The Monroy family was generally well-regarded in the region, especially Rafael. Guadalupe Monroy stated that "Rafael was respected in the town for his character and standing, in so much that District of Tula authorities asked that he represent the village and town and other organizations. He was consulted on various issues or questions."

=== Membership in the church ===
Monroy joined the LDS Church with his family and was baptized on June 11, 1913. The Monroy's association with the foreign missionaries and with the church immediately attracted the attention of the villagers, who were largely members of the Catholic faith. A Sunday sermon was directed against the Monroy family in San Marcos due to their apparent rejection of the Catholic faith. Written vulgarities were left on a wall outside their home, an boycott of their store was attempted, and many friends of the family withdrew, all of which contributed to the Monroy family's isolation from the rest of their community. However, the family responded to this treatment with increased faith and devotion to the LDS Church and its teachings.

Just three months after Monroy's baptism, Rey L. Pratt and the other missionaries of American citizenship were forced to leave due to the growing conflict and anti-American sentiment of the Mexican Revolution. Upon hearing of their departure, Monroy traveled to Mexico City in order to wish them well, and was made a branch president by Pratt upon his arrival. Monroy served as the branch president in San Marcos for two years, fulfilling his duties by holding Sunday meetings when possible, visiting church members, and writing to President Pratt for counsel regarding Church procedures and doctrine. Monroy later purchased land in San Marcos for possible use by Latter-day Saint colonists in the north, whose homes and lands were under attack by federal and revolutionary marauders.

=== Imprisonment and death ===
During the Mexican Revolution, one of the main goals of the revolutionaries was to diminish foreign influence and control in the country. As such, foreigners and those associated with them lived in increased danger. Given Monroy's association with the LDS Church and with American missionaries, he began receiving death threats from other villagers. As surrounding villages came under attack during the Mexican Revolution, Monroy and his family helped provide refuge in San Marcos, which was largely under control of the Carrancista (Constitutionalist) army, for those fleeing the violence.

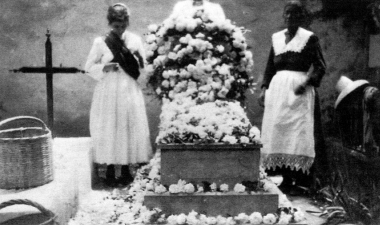
Mother and daughter decorating the grave of Rafael Monroy

On July 7, 1915, a group of Zapatista soldiers moved into the village of San Marcos and demanded food and other supplies from the Monroy family store. Monroy provided the troops with a steer that he helped to butcher. He then observed a neighbor by the name of Andres Reyes, who was known to dislike the Monroy family, talking with the troops. The troops returned and accused Monroy of being an officer in the Carrancista army and of stockpiling weapons and ammunition in his store. Monroy was then asked to show his weapons, to which he responded by holding up the copies of the Bible and Book of Mormon he carried in his pocket and saying "These are the only weapons I carry." After the store was searched and no weapons or ammunition were found, Monroy and Vicente Morales, a fellow Latter-day Saint and employee of the store, were both taken prisoner by the troop.

The two were then taken to a house that was being used as an improvised prison. Monroy was beaten several times during the afternoon in order to elicit a confession, yet he remained silent. Later that evening, after dinner, a group of soldiers demanded that Monroy and Morales follow them outside. Monroy made a final request to pray, which was granted him by the soldiers. The two men were then executed by firing squad at 9:00 PM, and their bodies released to their families the next morning.

== Legacy ==
Factors such as the two men's rejection of Catholicism, Monroy's middle class status, his relationship to citizens of the United States, his apparent support of the opposing revolutionary army, and his status as a merchant help explain the motive behind the killings. The deaths of Monroy and Morales conveyed their dedication and faithfulness to their faith, and their story forms an important part of the history of the church in Mexico.

In 1966, a film produced by the Brigham Young University Motion Picture Studio and presented by the Presiding Bishopric of the church was released about the story of the two men, titled And Should We Die. Filmed in the American Southwest, a Spanish language version of the film was later released, titled Aunque Nos Toque Morir.

== See also ==
- Latter Day Saint martyrs
- The Church of Jesus Christ of Latter-day Saints in Mexico
- Latino Mormons
