= Benemerito De Las Americas =

La Preparatoria Benemérito de las Américas
- Centro Escolar Benemérito de las Américas

Location
- Carretera Tenayuca-Chalmita #828; Colonia Zona Escolar, Gustavo A. Madero; 07230 México, Distrito Federal; México
- Coordinates: 19°32′17″N 99°09′12″W

Information
- School type: private secondary school
- Motto: Inteligencia, Poder, Luz y Verdad (Intelligence, Power, Light and Truth)
- Religious affiliation: The Church of Jesus Christ of Latter-day Saints
- Founded: 1964
- Closed: 2013
- Teaching staff: 120 (1999)
- Enrollment: 2,400 (2004)
- Campus: Rancho Arbolillo
- Campus size: 90 acres (36 ha)
- Colors: Gold: Represents Excellence. White: Represents Purity.
- Mascot: Leónes (Lions)
- Nickname: "The Bene"
- Website: benemerito.edu.mx

La Preparatoria Benemérito de las Américas, officially named El Centro Escolar Benemérito de las Américas (CEBA) was a private high school operated by the Church of Jesus Christ of Latter-day Saints (LDS Church) in Mexico City. At the end of the 2012–13 school year, the LDS Church converted the school to a Missionary Training Center (MTC).

== History ==
The first movement to organize the system of schools in Mexico was initiated by Claudio Bowman, president of the LDS Church's Mexican Mission. He bought land in Churubusco to construct a school and organized a committee to establish schools in Mexico. This committee, composed of Marion G. Romney, Joseph T. Bentley, and Bowman, with the help of the church's First Presidency, decided to establish schools in Mexico.

When the CEBA was founded it had 125 students and consisted in primary, secondary, and preparatory schools. It eventually increased as a preparatory school, accommodating day students as well and boarding students. At its peak, there were more than 2,100 students. It was closed at the end of the 2012-2013 school year.

The CEBA was founded in 1964 by Albert Kenyon Wagner and his wife, Leona Farnsworth Romney, who were the directors until 1975.

== Enrollment and education ==
CEBA accepted students from all over the Mexican territory and some students from North and South America. Even though the institution was private and owned by the LDS Church, it was also required to accept non-LDS students because of the educational laws the Mexican government applies to every school in Mexico.

Students at CEBA received secular and religious education. In addition to all student electives and traditional required subjects (such as Math, History, Spanish and English), students were required to take religious classes. Non-LDS students also took these religious classes. In these classes, LDS teachers prepared lessons based on the Bible and The Book of Mormon, with lessons intended to strengthen the religious and spiritual progress of the students.

=== Activities ===
In addition to secular and religious classes for students; there were a variety of student cultural and physical activities, including folk dance, choir, music, theater, basketball, volleyball, soccer, and football, among others. The school believed this would increase a student's physical condition, development talents, positive social environment, and use free time wisely. Students decided which activities they wanted to participate in and they'd go to practice every day after school. Some students became national champions in their sports, professional dancers or musicians. There were many facilities where students could practice, according to the activity they chose.

=== Housing ===
CEBA has 50 houses and 4 apartment buildings the students would live in, thereby allowing students from all over the Mexican Republic to attend. These houses were divided between female and male students. Every house consisted of 18 boys or girls and every apartment building has 112 students. A married adult couple was assigned to each house or apartment building to take care of the students and their medical or other needs they could have.

=== Honor Code ===
Because the school was a religiously based school, students and teachers had to follow an Honor Code, based on LDS Church standards. The school honor code specified how students should dress everyday and how to behave in order to stay at the school. For example, smoking and drinking alcohol inside or outside the school would lead to the termination of the student’s studies. Students wore a uniform when they went to classes and they dressed modestly when they were not in school.

== Transition to MTC ==
On January 29, 2013, the LDS Church announced the school would be closed and converted into a Missionary training center (MTC) at the end of the current school year. The new MTC opened June 26, 2013.

== Temple announcement ==
On April 3, 2022, during general conference, church president Russell M. Nelson announced that a temple would be constructed at the site.

== See also ==
- Church Educational System
