= Mexico City Mexico Temple =

Temple of Church of Jesus Christ of Latter-day Saints in Mexico City, Mexico

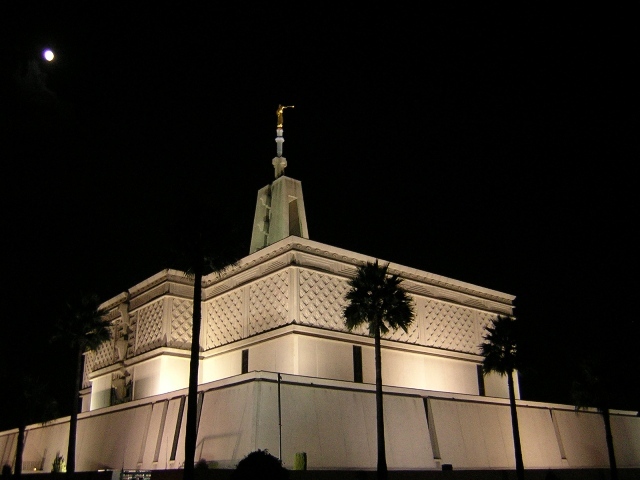
- Mexico City Mexico Temple
- Interactive map of Mexico City Mexico Temple
- Number: 26
- Dedication: 2 December 1983, by Gordon B. Hinckley
- Site: 7 acres (2.8 ha)
- Floor area: 116,642 ft^{2} (10,836.4 m^{2})
- Height: 152 ft (46 m)
- Official website • News & images

Church chronology
← Papeete Tahiti Temple	Mexico City Mexico Temple	→ Boise Idaho Temple

Additional information
- Announced: 3 April 1976, by Spencer W. Kimball
- Groundbreaking: 25 November 1979, by Boyd K. Packer
- Open house: 9–19 November 1983; 20 October – 8 November 2008; 14 August – 5 September 2015
- Rededicated: 16 November 2008, by Thomas S. Monson; September 13, 2015, by Henry B. Eyring
- Current president: Alberto De La O Gamboa
- Designed by: Emil B. Fetzer
- Location: Mexico City, Mexico
- Coordinates: 19°27′57.25799″N 99°5′12.31439″W
- Exterior finish: White cast stone
- Design: Modern adaptation of ancient Mayan architecture
- Baptistries: 1
- Ordinance rooms: 4 (stationary)
- Sealing rooms: 11
- Clothing rental: Yes
- Visitors' center: Yes
- Notes: The Mexico City Mexico Temple was closed March 30, 2007 for renovations and was rededicated Sunday, November 16, 2008. The temple was again closed in early 2014 for renovations. A public open house was held from Friday, August 14, 2015, through Saturday, September 5, 2015, excluding Sundays. The temple was rededicated on Sunday, September 13, 2015.

The Mexico City Mexico Temple (formerly the Mexico City Temple) is the 28th constructed and 26th operating temple of the Church of Jesus Christ of Latter-day Saints (LDS Church). The intent to build the temple was announced on April 3, 1967, by church president Spencer W. Kimball.

It is located in the north-eastern part of the Mexican capital, Mexico City. The architecture is influenced by the Mayan Revival style, and includes both Aztec and Mayan elements. The temple was designed by Emil B. Fetzer. A groundbreaking ceremony, to signify the beginning of construction, was held on November 25, 1979, conducted by Boyd K. Packer. It is the largest temple outside the United States.

== History ==
=== The LDS Church in Mexico ===
The history of the church in Mexico dates back to 1875, when portions of the Book of Mormon were translated into Spanish, and missionaries were sent to Mexico to distribute copies. The first converts were baptized in 1877, and the first branch was established in 1879. In 1886 the church published a Spanish edition of the Book of Mormon, and in 1944 temple ordinances were translated into Spanish. On November 6, 1945, church members from Mexico and the United States arrived at the Mesa Arizona Temple to receive their ordinances, marking the first time those ceremonies were performed in a language other than English.

In 1961, the church's first stake was established in Mexico City, and the 1970s had rapid growth. “In 1970 there were nearly 70,000 members in the country; by decade’s end there were close to 250,000.” As of 2023, Mexico had the second-largest body of church members in the world at over 1.5 million members, behind the United States.

=== Mexico City ===
The Mexico City Temple was announced on April 3, 1976, and dedicated on December 2, 1983 by Gordon B. Hinckley, a counselor in the church's First Presidency. The temple was built on a 7-acre (28,000 m^{2}) plot, has 4 ordinance rooms and 11 sealing rooms, and has a total floor area of 116,642 square feet (10,836.4 m^{2}). It was the first Latter-day Saint temple built in Mexico.

A groundbreaking ceremony to represent the start of construction was held on November 25, 1979. This event was presided over by Boyd K. Packer, and attended by 9,000 people, including local church members and community leaders.

When it was designed few temples featured an angel Moroni. It is one of five temples that have an angel Moroni symbolically holding a record of the ancient peoples in America in the form of gold plates. A visitors' center was included in the original design, with similar architectural features and a statue of Christ. The grounds include a water display in front, a garden, and are decorated with traditional Mexican plants.

When the temple was built it was property of the Mexican government bound under a law that stipulated all religious buildings should be open to all. However, the Mexican government made an exception to the law to allow the church's normal practice of only allowing members with temple recommends to enter the building. In 1992, Mexican law was reformed and ownership of the building was transferred to the church.

The temple closed March 30, 2007 for renovations that were expected to take up to 14 months. Renovations were completed and the church conducted guided tours of the temple from October 20 through November 8, 2008. Church president Thomas S. Monson rededicated the temple on November 16, 2008. The temple was again closed for renovations in early 2014. A public open house was held from 14 August through 5 September 2015, excluding Sundays. The temple was rededicated on September 13, 2015, by Henry B. Eyring, a counselor in the First Presidency.

== Design and architecture ==
The building was designed by church architect Emil B. Fetzer, and has a Mayan Revival architectural style, along with traditional Latter-day Saint temple design. The temple's architecture reflects both the cultural heritage of Mexico City and its spiritual significance to the church.

=== Site ===
The temple sits on a 1.82-acre plot, and the landscaping around the temple features flowers, palm trees, and grass, as well as a reflecting pool. There are distribution and visitors' centers on the temple grounds.

=== Exterior ===
The structure is constructed with white cast stone. The exterior has a “rectangular base, basket-weave design, and levels that decrease in size as the house of the Lord increases in height,” which were chosen for their symbolic significance and alignment with temple traditions. The temple also features a statue of the angel Moroni; it is one of five temples to have a statue of Moroni holding the gold plates.

=== Interior ===
The interior features carved columns and wood furniture, as well as art glass and carpets with Mesoamerican designs, centered around the baptistry, which is designed to foster a spiritually uplifting environment. The temple includes four instruction rooms, eleven sealing rooms, and one baptistry. Symbolic elements are integrated into the design, providing deeper meaning to the temple's function and aesthetics.

=== Symbols ===
The design has elements representing Latter-day Saint symbolism, providing spiritual meaning to its appearance and function. Symbolism is important to church members. Like all the church's temples, one of the most prominent examples of symbolism in this temple is the twelve carved oxen which support the baptismal font. The oxen represent the 12 tribes of Israel.

== Renovations ==
Over the years, the Mexico City Mexico temple has undergone several renovations to preserve its structural integrity, update facilities, and enhance its spiritual and aesthetic appeal. The most significant renovation project commenced in 2007.

Temple renovations included structural upgrades and remodeling of the interior. These changes were made to ensure the temple's compliance with contemporary building standards and to accommodate the evolving needs of the church and its members.

The renovated Mexico City Mexico Temple was rededicated on November 16, 2008, by Thomas S. Monson. Following further renovation that began in 2014, the temple was rededicated on September 13, 2015, by Henry B. Eyring.

== Cultural and community impact ==
The temple and its surrounding grounds are used for its annual Christmas celebration, where grounds are decorated with “hundreds of thousands of lights in a festive display of the season.” This event highlights efforts to promote mutual understanding among residents of diverse backgrounds.

The adjacent visitors' center, equipped with historical exhibits and interactive displays, provides comprehensive educational resources, providing both members and non-members with an in-depth understanding of the history of the church in Mexico and the temple's unique place in church history.

== Temple presidents ==
The church's temples are directed by a temple president and matron, each serving for a term of three years. The president and matron oversee the administration of temple operations and provide guidance and training for both temple patrons and staff.

The first president of the Mexico City Mexico Temple was Harold Brown, with the matron being Leanor J. Brown. They served from 1983 to 1987. As of 2024, Miguel A. Fernandez is the president, with Martha I. Fernandez serving as matron.

== Admittance ==
Following initial construction, a public open house was held from November 9–19, 1983. (excluding Sundays), which was attended by over 120,000 people. The temple was dedicated by Gordon B. Hinckley in nine sessions from December 2–4, 1983.

The temple was renovated from 2007-2008. Prior to rededication, a public open house was again held, this time from October 20-November 8, 2008. Thomas S. Monson rededicated the temple on November 16, 2008, in two sessions.

The temple again closed for renovations in 2014. Following those renovations, a public open house was held from August 14-September 5, 2015, with over 96,000 visitors. The temple was rededicated by Henry B. Eyring on September 13, 2015, in three sessions.

Like all the church's temples, it is not used for Sunday worship services. To members of the church, temples are regarded as sacred houses of the Lord. Once dedicated, only church members with a current temple recommend can enter for worship.

== See also ==
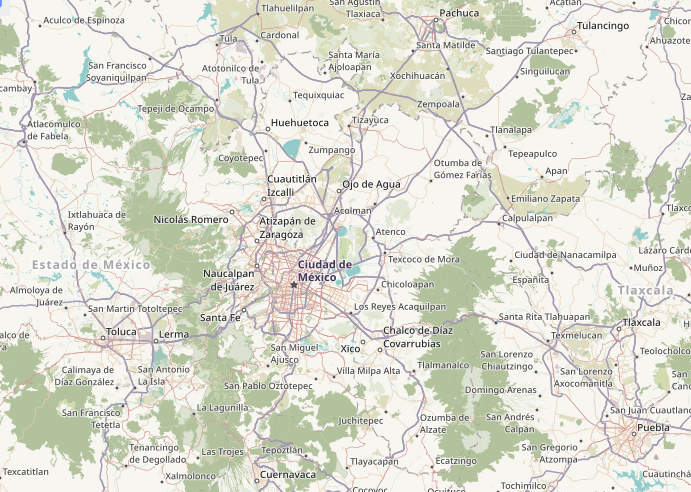

Temples in Central Mexico

Northwestern Mexico Temples
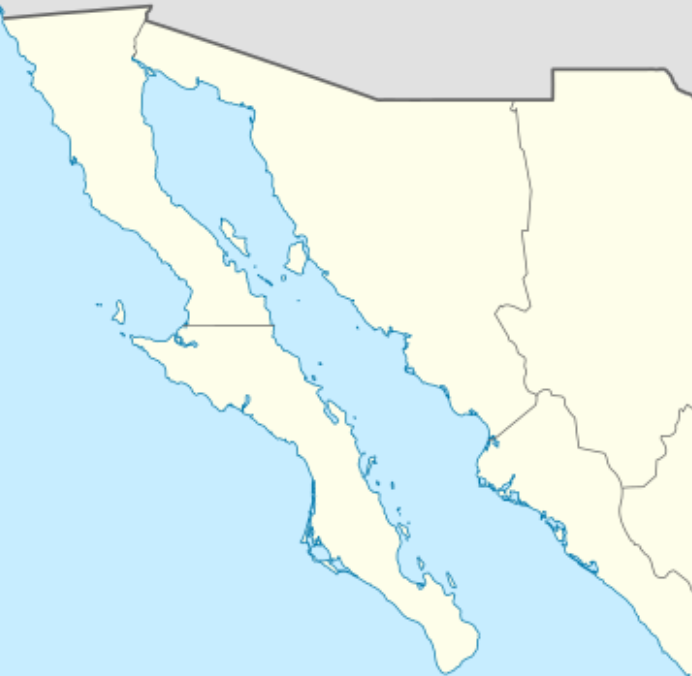
Temples in Northwestern Mexico
Northeastern Mexico Temples
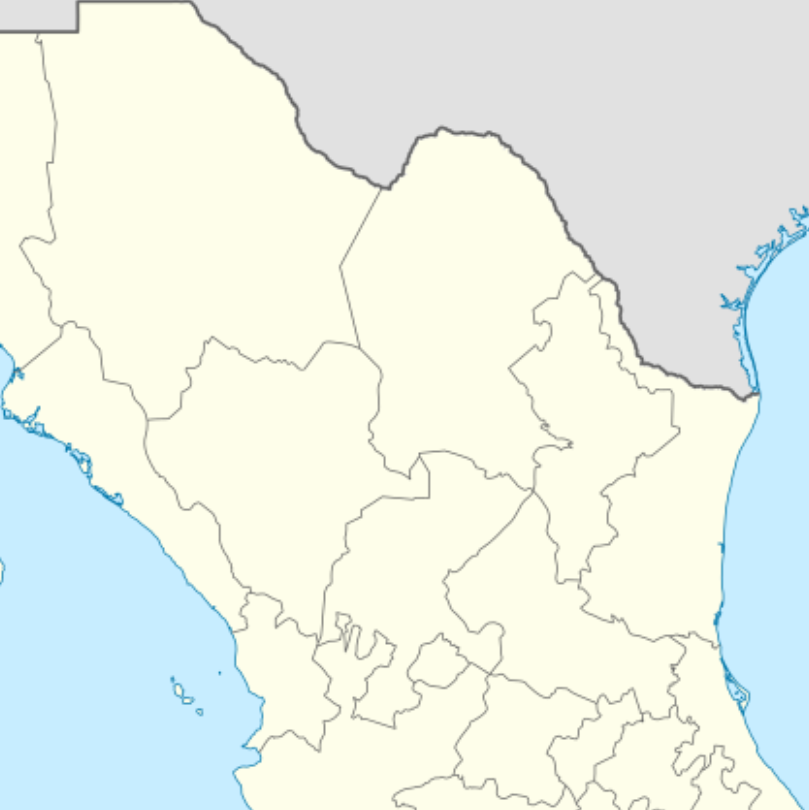
Temples in Northeastern Mexico
Central Mexico Temples
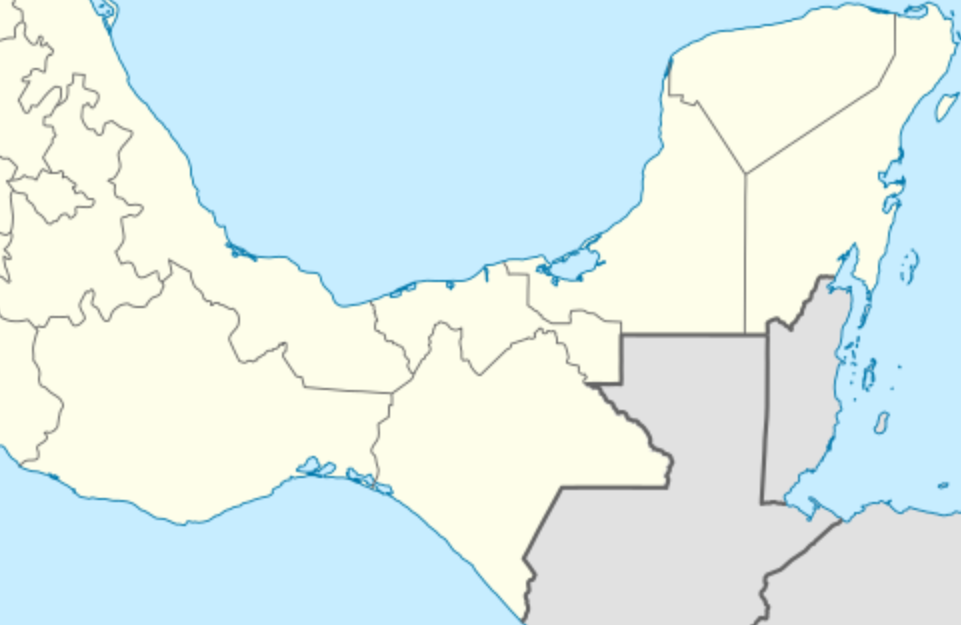
Temples in Southeast Mexico
Mexico Map
Temples in Mexico

= Operating
= Under construction
= Announced
= Temporarily Closed

- Ted E. Brewerton, a former temple president
- Comparison of temples of The Church of Jesus Christ of Latter-day Saints
- List of temples of The Church of Jesus Christ of Latter-day Saints
- List of temples of The Church of Jesus Christ of Latter-day Saints by geographic region
- Temple architecture (Latter-day Saints)
- The Church of Jesus Christ of Latter-day Saints in Mexico
