= Ammon M. Tenney =

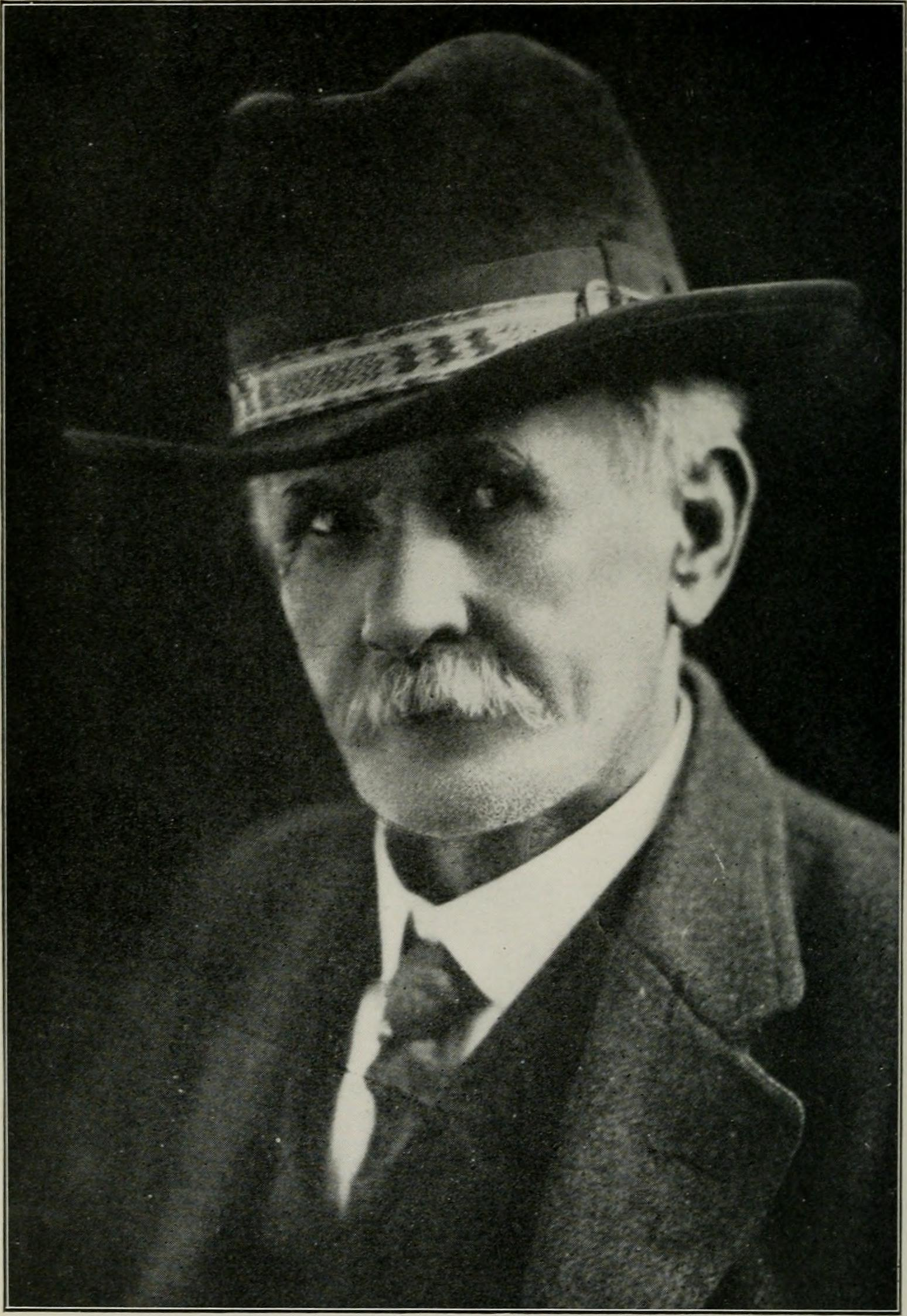
Ammon M. Tenney

Ammon Meshach Tenney (November 16, 1844 – October 28, 1925) was an American Mormon missionary in Arizona, New Mexico and Mexico, who taught the message of the Church of Jesus Christ of Latter-day Saints (LDS Church) to peoples of the Zuni and the Isleta Pueblos, baptizing hundreds. He also was the first president of the Mexican Mission after it was reorganized in 1901.

== Biography ==
Tenney was born in 1844 in Lee County, Iowa. He came to Utah in 1848 and later moved with his parents to San Bernardino County, California. It was in San Bernardino that Tenney first learned Spanish. In 1858 the Tenneys moved to Utah, settling in Grafton, Utah in 1859. Starting about this time Tenney worked closely with Jacob Hamblin in missionary work among the Hopi, Kaibab and other Native American groups.

In 1876 Tenney was among the first seven LDS missionaries called to go to Mexico.

In 1879 Tenney bought the land rights for St. Johns, Arizona from the Barth brothers and began the Mormon settlement of that city.

In 1887–1889 Tenney again served in the Mexican Mission, this time heading missionary efforts in Northern Mexico. Tenney started with a group of four other elders. However the first on this mission went to the vicinity of Mesa, Arizona and rebaptized Encarnacion Valenzuela, a Papago who had been a member of the LDS Church for some years. This rebaptism was to symbolize Valenzuela's new commitment as a missionary and not due to any lack of current standing in the church on his part. Valenzuela and Cheroquis, another Papago Latter-day Saint, who had been sealed to his wife in the St. George Temple by Wilford Woodruff joined Tenney and his associates. Then went south preaching to the Pima in Arizona and the Yaquis in Mexico. To do baptisms Tenney, Valenzuela and their associates dug holes that filled with well water.

Among those Tenney baptized when he presided over the newly reopened Mexican mission starting in 1901 was Fidencia Garcia de Rojas, then age 18, who was still alive to see the organization of the hundredth LDS stake in Mexico in 1989. In 1901, Tenney also baptized Margarito Bautista, and after his baptism Bautista helped Tenney proselytize in Mexico. Bautista went on to become a notable preacher and missionary in his own right and later a leader in the Third Convention movement.
