= Mormon colonies in Mexico =

LDS church settlements in Mexico

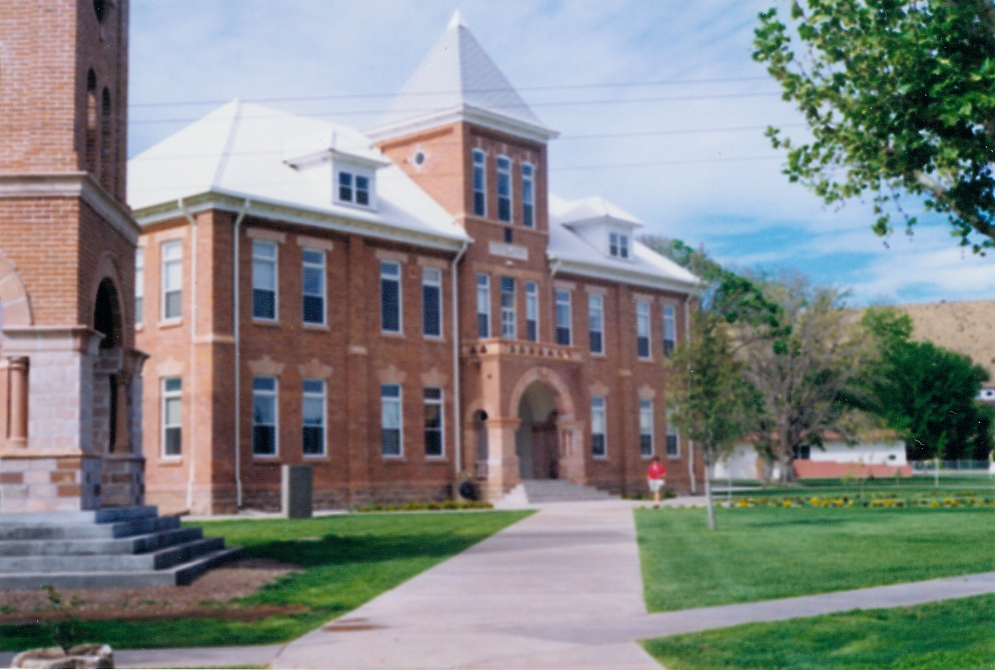
Academia Juárez, part of the Mormon community from Colonia Juárez.

The Mormon colonies in Mexico (Spanish: colonias Mormonas en México) are settlements located near the Sierra Madre mountains in northern Mexico which were established by members of the Church of Jesus Christ of Latter-day Saints (LDS Church) beginning in 1885. The colonists came to Mexico due to federal attempts to curb and prosecute polygamy in the United States. Plural marriage, as polygamous relationships were called by church members, was an important tenet of the church—although it was never practiced by a majority of the membership.

The towns making up the colonies were situated in the Mexican states of Chihuahua and Sonora, and were all within roughly 200 miles (322 km) south of the US border. By the early 20th century, many of these settlements were relatively prosperous. However, in the summer of 1912, the colonies were evacuated en masse because of anti-American sentiment during the Mexican Revolution. Most of the colonists left for the United States and never returned, although a small group of Latter-day Saints eventually found their way back to homes and farms in the colonies. Because new plural marriages in Mexico had been prohibited by the church following the Second Manifesto of 1904, generally, those who returned to the original colonies did not enter into new plural marriages and remained members of the LDS Church. Many of their descendants live in Colonia Juárez and Colonia Dublán, the only two settlements of the original colonies that remain active. In 1999, the church constructed the Colonia Juárez Chihuahua Mexico Temple to serve members still living in the area.

After the Second Manifesto was issued, the LDS Church began to excommunicate members who entered into new polygamist marriages. This resulted in excommunicated members forming their own churches, and these off-shoot groups (known as fundamentalist Mormons) are not affiliated with the LDS Church. Some of these fundamentalist groups later established new colonies and settlements in areas near the original Latter-day Saint Mexican and Canadian colonies. One fundamentalist group, the LeBaron family, had established Colonia LeBarón in the state of Chihuahua by the 1920s. Many descendants of these fundamentalist Mormons continue to live in the newer settlements, although not all continue to practice polygamy.

== Latter-day Saint colonies ==
=== Early colonization ===
As early as 1874, Brigham Young, President of the LDS Church, called for a mission to Mexico. In 1875, settlers set out with the dual purpose of proselytizing and finding prospective locations for Latter-day Saint settlements. The missionaries returned with positive reports the next year and another group was sent in October 1876. In 1877, Young discussed the idea of colonizing parts of northern Mexico, but it was considered unwise due to the considerable danger from Apache raiders in the area. Young died later that year and leadership of the church fell to John Taylor as President of the Quorum of the Twelve Apostles. John Taylor was ordained as Prophet in 1880.

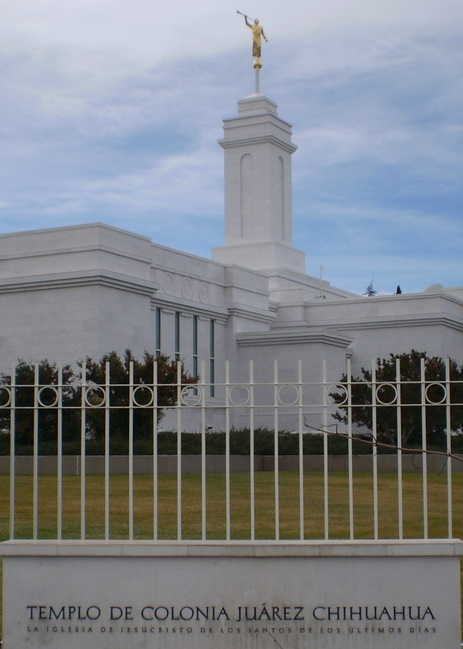
The Colonia Juárez Chihuahua México Temple

Taylor continued Young's policy of missionary work in Mexico, and through the early 1880s colonization was considered on several occasions without effort to begin the process. However, in 1882 the Edmunds Act was passed by the United States Congress. This was part of the by-then 20-year struggle by the U.S. government to curb the LDS practice of plural marriage in Utah Territory and other locations in the American West. Among other things, the law felonized the practice of polygamy and disenfranchised polygamists. As a result, over a thousand Latter-day Saint men and women were eventually fined and jailed. Some were sent as far away as Michigan to fulfill their terms.

In 1885 President John Taylor purchased 100,000 acres of land in Mexico. This act allowed over 350 Latter-day Saint families who practiced polygamy from Utah and Arizona to settle land in Mexico. This was a very strenuous task, but it allowed the men the opportunity to keep their multiple wives without being fined and jailed. These people started their own farming colonies and established their settlements in Chihuahua and Sonora, where they focused their labors on sheep, cattle, wheat, row crops, and fruit orchards.

=== End of new plural marriages ===
In September 1890, the president of the LDS Church issued the Manifesto which advised ending new plural marriages in the United States, although the practice was permitted to be continued in the colonies of Mexico and Canada. In 1904 the church issued the Second Manifesto, after which entering into new plural marriages was prohibited among the church membership worldwide. Neither the 1890 Manifesto or 1904 Second Manifesto ended existing plural marriages, and many of these families continued to cohabitate (with the blessing of the church) until their deaths in the 1940s and 1950s.

=== Evacuation and return ===
The anti-foreign sentiment of the Mexican Revolution in 1910 made life there for the Latter-day Saint colonists difficult, with many threats to their lives and property; the colonists returned to the United States. With the absence of American LDS leaders, many indigenous Mexicans, who were proselytized during the Revolution, assumed leadership duties until the violence ceased around 1920. When it was decided it was safe, less than one-quarter of the previous LDS population re-settled to Mexico; most of the refugees returned to their Utah and Arizona colonies of origin. Upon returning to Mexico, the American LDS leaders arrived to find that the church was still intact and operating in Mexico. The Mexican Latter-day Saints' colonies did not return to their previous success due to the poor living conditions and farming land. Only two colonies remain: Colonia Dublán and Colonia Juárez.

=== List of Latter-day Saint colonies ===
Plateau colonies

- Colonia Díaz
- Colonia Juárez
- Colonia Dublán

Mountain colonies

- Colonia Pacheco
- Cave Valley
- Colonia Chuichupa
- Colonia García (Round Valley)

Sonora colonies

- Colonia Oaxaca
- Colonia Morelos
- Colonia San José

=== Prominent citizens ===
Members of the Romney family have roots in these colonies, including both Marion G. Romney and George W. Romney having been born there.

== Latter-day Saint colonies in other areas of Mexico ==
Many Latter-day Saint settlements in the United States are in areas that at one time belonged to Mexico, but nearly all of these were already part of the United States at the time of settlement. The exception is Salt Lake City itself, which was settled in the summer of 1847 in what was at the time legally a remote part of the Mexican territory of Alta California. However, the ongoing territorial disputes incident to the Mexican–American War brought the area officially under US control in 1848 as part of the Mexican Cession.

== Fundamentalist Mormon colonies ==
After the Second Manifesto was issued, the LDS Church began to excommunicate members who entered into new polygamist marriages. This resulted in excommunicated members forming their own churches, and these off-shoot groups (known as fundamentalist Mormons) are not affiliated with the LDS Church. Some of these fundamentalist groups later established new colonies and settlements in areas near the original Latter-day Saint Mexican and Canadian colonies. One fundamentalist group, the LeBaron family, had established Colonia Le Barón in the state of Chihuahua by the 1920s. Many descendants of these fundamentalist Mormons continue to live in the newer settlements, although not all continue to practice polygamy.

=== Fundamentalist Indigenous Mexican Leaders ===
While there were many excommunicated Mormons who fled to Mexico for practicing plurality, there were also groups in Mexico, led by indigenous religious leaders, who were also excommunicated for practicing plurality. Margarito Bautista is one such example who was excommunicated and founded his own polygamist commune in Ozumba named The Colonia Industrial Mexicana Nueva Jerusalen which still has over one thousand members.

=== List of fundamentalist Mormon colonies ===
- Colonia Le Barón
- Colonia Los Molinos, Baja California
- Colonia Industrial de la Nueva Jerusalén, Ozumba México
- La Mora. Bavispe, Sonora
- Chulavista, Quintana Roo

== Mexican Mormon Contributions in Mexico ==
For practicing members of The Church of Jesus Christ of Latter-day Saints an important facet of their religion is literacy. The church believed it paramount that its members were able to read and understand the texts they were following. Prior to the establishment and development of the public education system in Mexico, the church began to establish schools in their Anglo-American colonies in Mexico while Indigenous led educational initiatives in Central Mexico existed before direct church intervention. Bernabe Parra of San Marcos, Hidalgo established the first school for Latter-day Saint Mexicans in Central Mexico in 1944 which grew to 211 students in 1959.

=== Bernabe Parra and the "Héroes de Chapúltepec" School ===
Bernabe Parra built a sizeable community of Latter-day Saints in his home town of San Marcos, located in Hidalgo, Mexico. Bernabe Parra recognized the need for local education for families in his area, as not many had the resources to send their children to schools in other established Mormon colonies and many were functionally illiterate. The first school Parra established was confined to the walls of his personal home and taught a class of six students in 1944. By December of 1944, the school would grow to eighteen students. Parra recognized the need for more space and petitioned The Church of Jesus Christ of Latter-day Saints for them to be brought into the fold of their school system. The church denied this request, so Parra purchased a plot of land and donated it to be used as the site of the official school building. The school would continue to see growth, in both students and teachers, until 1957 when they would officially rename the school to the "Héroes de Chapúltepec". The "Héroes de Chapúltepec" would become the school model that the church would follow for their new educational initiatives in Mexico.

== See also ==
- The Church of Jesus Christ of Latter-day Saints in Mexico
- Margarito Bautista
- Mennonites in Mexico
- Mormon Corridor
- State of Deseret
- Latter-day Saint settlements in Canada
- Third Convention
