= Aldo Richins =

American football player (1910–1995)

No. 6, 5
- Position: Wingback

Personal information
- Born: November 2, 1910; Colonia Díaz, Mexico
- Died: April 19, 1995 (aged 84); Midvale, Utah, U.S.
- Listed height: 5 ft 9 in (1.75 m)
- Listed weight: 188 lb (85 kg)

Career information
- High school: West (Salt Lake City, Utah, U.S.)
- College: Utah

Career history
- Detroit Lions (1935); Salt Lake Seagulls (1936)
- Stats at Pro Football Reference

Aldo Osborn "Al" Richins (November 2, 1910 – April 19, 1995) was a Mexican-American professional football wingback who played one season with the Detroit Lions of the National Football League (NFL). He is distinguished as being the first Mexican to play in the NFL.

== Early life and college ==
Aldo Osborn was born on November 2, 1910, in Colonia Díaz, Mexico. He attended West High School in Salt Lake City, Utah, participating in football, baseball, basketball, and track. He received "Athlete of the Year" honors in 1929. He was later inducted into the West High School "Hall of Fame.

Richins played college football for the Utah Utes of the University of Utah, and was a three-year letterman from 1932 to 1934. He received the school's most outstanding athlete of the year award in 1934.

== Professional career ==
In September 1935, he signed with the Detroit Lions of the National Football League. He played in one game for the Lions during the 1935 season before being released.

In 1946 at 36 years old, he played for the Salt Lake Seagulls of the Pacific Coast Football League. He attempted one extra point that year.

== Personal life ==
After football, he worked for the Salt Lake County Sheriff's Office for eight years. He later owned a motel and a restaurant. He died on April 19, 1995, in Midvale, Utah.
