= Colonia Dublán =

Mormon colony in Mexico

Coordinates: 30°26′N 107°54′W

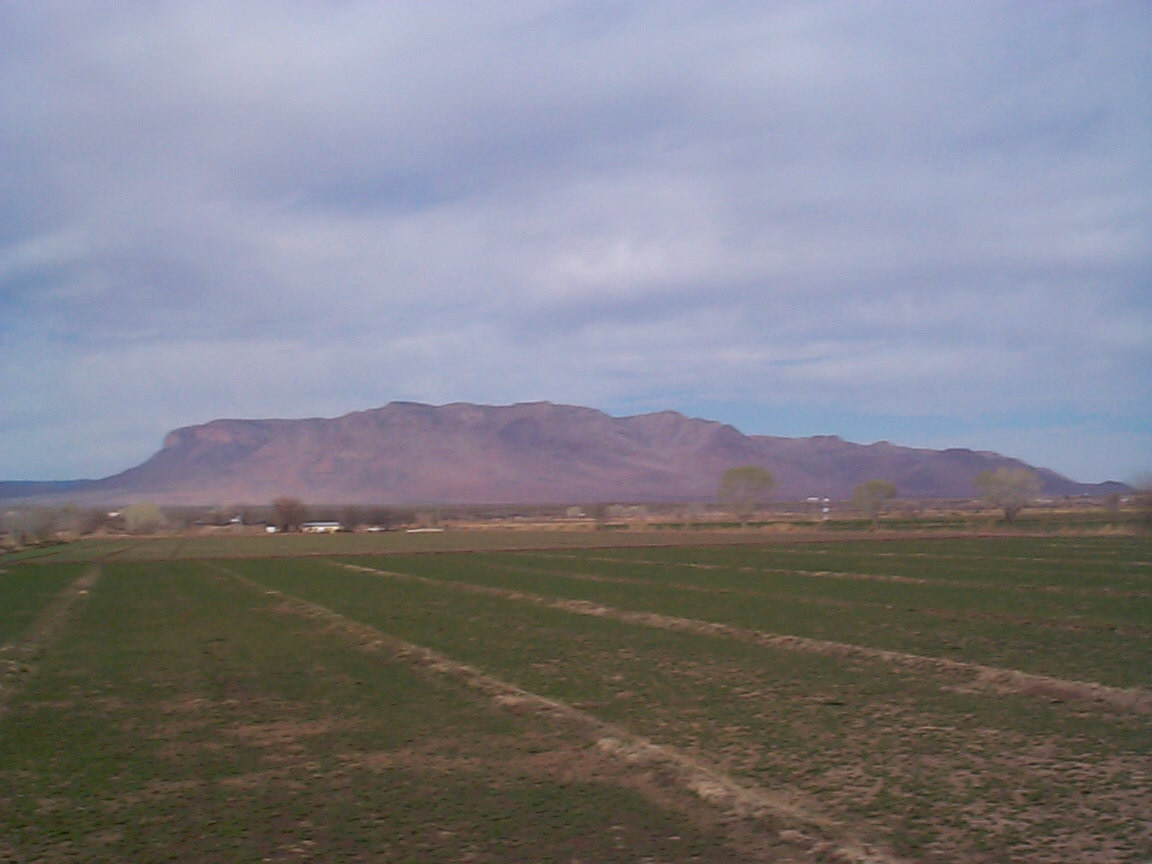
A view of a prominent mountain, El Pajarito, to the west of Dublán, is a sight those who have lived in Colonia Dublán will easily recognize.

Colonia Dublán began as a Mormon colony, located in the state of Chihuahua, Mexico. It is now a part of Nuevo Casas Grandes Municipality. It is one of two surviving Mormon colonies in Mexico (the other being Colonia Juárez).

== History ==
The Edmunds Act, or Edmunds Anti-Polygamy Act of 1882, was passed by the United States Congress in response to unrest about the Mormon practice of polygamy. It made polygamy a felony in U.S. territories and revoked polygamists' voting rights and their ability to serve on juries. These restrictions applied not only to those practicing polygamy but also to all members of the Church of Jesus Christ of Latter-day Saints who professed belief in the church's doctrine of plural marriage. The Edmunds–Tucker Act of 1887 provided further sanction, making polygamy punishable by fines and imprisonment. Mormons who practiced polygamy did not discontinue the practice; rather, they tried to maintain it in secret. As a result, either many children were kept hidden or their paternity was kept hidden. These families, which were already complicated, were struggling under the new legal strictures. Federal marshals frequently patrolled the Utah Territory on horseback looking for polygamists, and many of the church leaders were arrested. Many of the community's business and political leaders were forced underground, disrupting the community at large.

Several men were called in 1875 to serve missions in Mexico, where they preached to Mexican people and scouted for land for potential future colonization. These missionaries were impressed with the city of Chihuahua, which had many buildings and churches, including a cathedral. Other groups of missionaries followed. In 1879, a Belgian man named Emilio Biebuyck, who had been to Utah and was very influential in Mexico, had permission from the Mexican government to establish colonies in the Mexican states, with land and subsidies to be given to colonizers. He petitioned the Council of the Church to accept this offer, but the Council determined they were not yet ready to establish colonies in Mexico.

In 1885, several church leaders rented 300 acres (1.2 km^{2}) of land in northern Chihuahua, and Mormon members began to plant crops. Other Mormon families from Utah and Arizona soon joined their fledgling community. Six weeks after the original settlers began to cultivate the area, the colonists numbered 350. Certain local officials became suspicious of the increase in the Mormon refugees and their activities. They appealed to the secretary of the state of Chihuahua, characterizing them as an armed band and implying they had nefarious intentions. The settlers were given orders to leave within 16 days. Some church leaders were given an audience with the governor of Chihuahua, who had dealings with Mormons in the past and been favorably impressed. He welcomed them as colonists.

The first Mormon pioneers arrived in Mexico in 1885, founding Colonia Díaz. In 1888, George M. Brown of Provo, Utah, made a deal with German-Mexican Lewis Huller for 73,000 acres (300 km^{2}) of land north of what was then the Casas Grandes River. The colony, which was originally called Colonia Huller, was first settled by George Lake, a Mormon colonist, with many others following in the spring of 1889. However, due to a problem with the deal between Brown and Huller, titles to the land could not be given to them. Instead, the colonists were forced to rent from locals or make their own individual purchases. When it was founded, the nearest train station to the colony was Gallego, 110 miles (180 km) away. Since a large percentage of goods consumed by the colony had to be imported from the United States, prices were high. In 1897, a railroad was built from Ciudad Juárez to a point twelve miles (19 km) outside Dublán. The railroad proved extremely valuable for the colony, as goods could be cheaply imported and exported.

The Mexican colonies were founded to provide shelter from the persecution and legal restrictions of the United States, and also created new opportunities to do proselytizing. Families that participated in this colonization effort did so with the intention to build a home refuge for their families and intended for their posterity to remain there. While they escaped the threat of persecution for practicing polygamy, they faced other difficulties in the form of disease, political unrest, conflict with the Mexican population, and drought.

The colonists suffered under extreme poverty as they built their homes and farms and did whatever low-paying jobs they could find. But after years of effort, the colonies began to flourish and demonstrated industry and culture. They were laid out in the same foursquare design with wide streets used in Salt Lake City and bore a strong resemblance to other Mormon settlements. Mexican revolutionaries saw much to be suspicious of: they were Americans, they were wealthier than their Mexican neighbors, and they enjoyed many privileges given them by the government of Porfirio Díaz. In addition, they were loyal to the United States and were mostly of European descent. Due to these factors and the ongoing revolution, Pancho Villa Rebel groups forced them to return to the United States in 1912.

They were given an order to leave their homes and return to the United States on July 28. Within two days, almost all of the colonists had fled, with the hope that this would be a temporary exile. But when some of the residents returned in the autumn of 1912 and later in 1915, they discovered that the warring factions had burned most of the settlers' property and little could be salvaged from the rubble. Most of the colonists resettled in Utah and Arizona. A few of the original settlers returned to Colonia Dublán and Colonia Juárez, but none of the other six colonies was ever resettled.

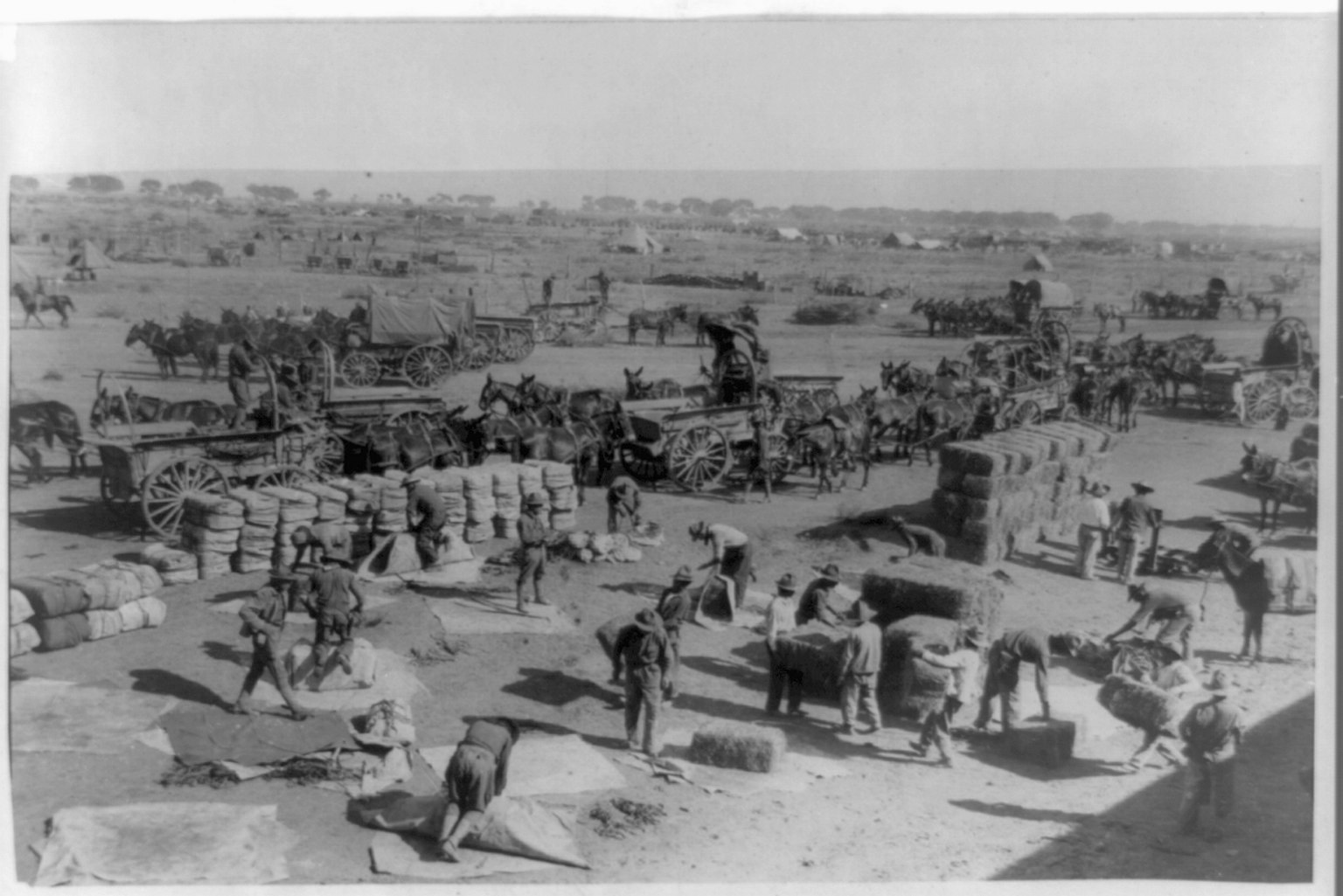
Unloading supplies brought by railroad for the U.S. army

In 1916, Colonia Dublan was chosen for the headquarters of the Pancho Villa Expedition for its proximity to the railroad.

The community was also the birthplace of George W. Romney, former U.S. Housing and Urban Development (HUD) secretary and father of former U.S. Senator and 2012 presidential nominee Mitt Romney.

== Present day ==
Colonia Dublán is currently a very small town located just north of Nuevo Casas Grandes. Most of the remaining residents engage in agriculture and produce crops such as peaches, apples, pecans and chile. There is also significant production of wheat and cattle. Most members of the Mormon community are now of Mexican descent. The remaining descendants of the colonists belong to the LDS Church and continue to serve a role within that church in Mexico.
