= Mormon corridor =

Areas of the Western US settled by the LDS Church

Mormon corridor Mormon culture region, Book of Mormon belt
- Cultural region of the United States
- The Mormon corridor, highlighted in red. Striped counties contain major Mormon populations, but are not considered to be a part of the cardinal regions of their states.
- Country: United States
- States: Arizona; Colorado; Idaho; Nevada; Utah; Wyoming

The Mormon corridor describes a region of the Western United States that was settled between 1850 and approximately 1890 by members of the Church of Jesus Christ of Latter-day Saints (LDS Church), who are commonly called Mormons, where a large Mormon population has created a culturally distinct region.

In academic literature, the area is also commonly called the Mormon culture region. It has also been referred to as the Book of Mormon belt.

== Location ==
The Mormon culture region generally follows the path of the Rocky Mountains of North America, with most of the population clustered in the United States. Beginning in Utah, the corridor extends northward through western Wyoming and eastern Idaho to parts of Montana and the deep south regions of the Canadian province of Alberta. It reaches south to San Bernardino, California on the west and through Tucson, Arizona on the east, reaches west to the Jordan Valley, Oregon area extending southward to Eldorado, Texas, and finally the U.S.-Mexico border, with isolated settlements in Baja California, Chihuahua, and Sonora. Settlements in Utah, south of the Wasatch Front, stretched from St. George in the southwest to Nephi in the northeast, including the Sevier River valley. The corridor is roughly congruent with the area between present-day Interstate 15 and U.S. Route 89. Outside of the Wasatch Front, and Utah's Cache Valley, most of the population of the state resides in this corridor.

== History ==
Map of Latter-Day Saints membership as a percentage of the state population (upper) and total membership distribution. Note that not all Mormons are part of the church.

The larger chain of Mormon settlements, ranging from Canada to Mexico, were initially established as agricultural centers or to gain access to metals and other materials needed by the expanding Mormon population. The communities also served as waystations for migration and trade centered on Salt Lake City during the mid to late 19th century.

Communities in the generally fertile but relatively dry valleys of the Great Basin, Southeastern Idaho, Nevada, and Arizona were dependent on water supplies. Irrigation systems, including wells, dams, canals, headgates, and ditches were among the first projects for a new community. Road access to timber in the mountains and pasturage for stock were important, as were carefully tended crops, gardens, and orchards.

=== Initial settlements ===
Brigham Young, LDS Church president (1847–1877), personally supervised the founding of many outlying communities. Exploring parties were sent out to find settlement sites, and to identify sources of appropriate minerals, timber, and water. Historian Leonard J. Arrington asserted that within ten years of the LDS arrival in the Salt Lake Valley, "...nearly 100 colonies had been planted; by 1867, more than 200; and by the time of (Young's) death in 1877, nearly 400 colonies." These colonies had four distinct purposes: "...first, settlements intended to be temporary places of gathering and recruitment, such as Carson Valley in Nevada; second, colonies to serve as centers for production, such as iron at Cedar City, cotton at St. George, cattle in Cache Valley, and sheep in Spanish Fork, all in Utah; third, colonies to serve as centers for proselytizing and assisting Indians, as at Harmony in southern Utah, Las Vegas in southern Nevada, Fort Lemhi (north-central Idaho near the Lemhi Pass), and present-day Moab in eastern Utah; fourth, permanent colonies in Utah and nearby states and territories to provide homes and farms for the hundreds of new immigrants arriving each summer."

At times, Young or his agents met incoming wagon trains of Mormon pioneers, assigning the groups a secondary destination to establish a new community. After a relatively brief rest in the growing communities of the Salt Lake Valley, the groups would restock needed supplies and materials, gather livestock, and travel on. In addition, new colonists could be called from the pulpit. Young read the names of men and their families who were "called" to move to outlying regions. These "missions" for church members often lasted for years, as the families were to remain in their assigned area until released from the calling or given a new assignment. Colonists traveled at their own expense, and success depended on appropriate supplies and personal resourcefulness, as well as uncontrolled variables such as water supplies and weather.

Several of these colonies could also have provided support for a second migration of the Latter-day Saints which might have become necessary due to pressure by the U.S. government, starting with the Utah War. Some settlements were associated with existing or prior towns, and many were abandoned once the threat of persecution decreased after the 1890 Manifesto, and the transportation system in the Western United States matured. The first transcontinental railroad was especially significant in reinforcing or altering settlement patterns.

After Young's death in 1877, successive leaders of the LDS Church continued to establish new settlements in outlying areas of the west. The Salt River Valley in western Wyoming, now known as Star Valley, was designated for settlement in August 1878, while Bunkerville and Mesquite, Nevada were settled in 1879 and 1880 respectively. Communities were also established in eastern and southeastern Utah and western Colorado, primarily populated by LDS Church converts from the southern United States. Historians James B. Allen and Glen M. Leonard estimate that at least 120 new LDS-based settlements were founded between 1876 and 1879.

=== Settlements due to opposition to polygamy ===
Mounting legislation and prosecution of polygamists within the Latter-day Saint population in the United States led to additional expansion. In 1884, church president John Taylor encouraged groups of church members in Arizona and New Mexico to cross the border into Mexico, where church leaders had investigated settlement opportunities in earlier years. By the end of 1885, however, the Mormon colonists had been denied the opportunity to purchase land within Chihuahua, by order of the acting governor. While the colonists remained on rented land, negotiations between members of the LDS Church's Quorum of Twelve Apostles and Mexican president Porfirio Díaz were successful and legal barriers were lifted. For his help towards the LDS settlers, the first Mormon colony in Mexico was named Colonia Díaz. This settlement was shortly followed by two additional communities. In March 1886, Colonia Juarez and Colonia Dublán were established, with other smaller settlements emerging in future years.

Taylor instructed Charles Ora Card of Logan, Utah, to investigate, and if possible, establish similar communities of refuge in the Canadian North-West Territories. Card led a small group of explorers into present-day Alberta in 1886 and selected a settlement site. In 1887, enough settlers arrived from northern Utah to establish the community of Cardston. By 1895, many additional LDS-based communities had been established in nearby areas in the province, partially because of a labour contract with the Alberta Irrigation Company.

== "Jell-O Belt" ==
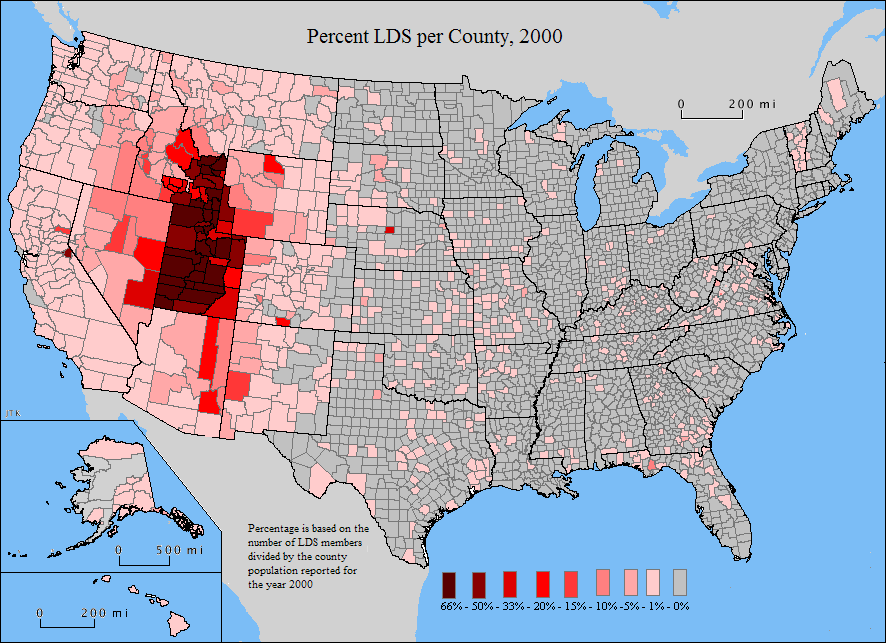
Latter-Day Saints membership percentage of the U.S. population by county in 2000

The Mormon corridor has been nicknamed the "Jell-O belt" due to the popularity of Jell-O in the region. One of the official pins for the 2002 Winter Olympics in Salt Lake City was a green Jell-O jiggler in the shape of the state.

According to Carolyn Wyman in an article for the Los Angeles Times, "Salt Lake City is America's Jell-O-eating capital. Every man, woman and child in Salt Lake City buys two boxes of the stuff annually, or twice the national average, says Mary Jane Kinkade of Jell-O brand gelatin-maker Kraft Foods. According to that same article, she claims that Utah residents also eat twice as much lime Jell-O as anyone else on the planet."

== See also ==
- Belt regions of the United States
- Culture of The Church of Jesus Christ of Latter-day Saints
- Eastern Idaho
- State of Deseret
- Mormon communities in Arizona
- Mormon communities in Colorado
- Mormon communities in Idaho
- Mormon communities in Nevada
- Mormon communities in New Mexico
- Mormon communities in Utah
- Mormon communities in Wyoming
- Mormon Trail
