= Margarito Bautista =

Mexican Mormon leader (1878–1961)

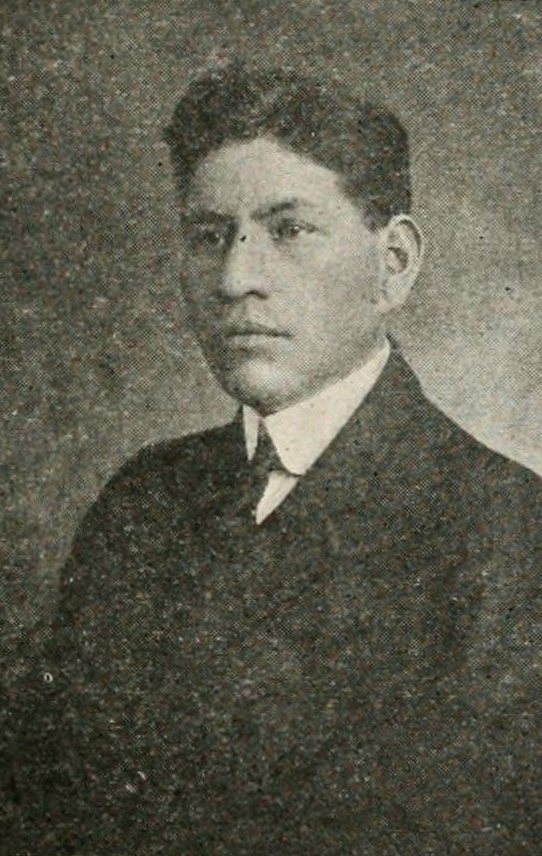
- Bautista c. 1920
- Born: June 10, 1878; San Miguel, Atlautla, State of Mexico, Mexico
- Died: August 4, 1961 (aged 83); Colonia Industrial de la Nueva Jerusalén, Ozumba, State of Mexico, Mexico
- Occupations: Preacher; theologian; writer; religious founder
- Known for: Mexican Mormonism; Latter-day Saint theology; religious utopianism

Margarito Bautista (June 10, 1878 – August 4, 1961) was a Mexican evangelist and religious founder who wrote and preached for the Church of Jesus Christ of Latter-day Saints (LDS Church). After converting in 1901, Bautista preached for the church through word and writing for three decades and spent time in Mexico and Utah. During this time, Bautista developed a theology that fused Book of Mormon doctrine with Mexican nationalism, and he claimed Mexicans held a birthright to lead the church and someday the world. The church's Anglo-American leaders often considered Bautista's interpretations out of line with official doctrine, but they became very popular with Mexican Latter-day Saints.

After Bautista helped lead a Mexican Latter-day Saint convention to protest the calling of an Anglo-American as a mission president in Mexico, the church excommunicated Bautista, and he went on to help lead the Third Convention breakaway movement. When Bautista pushed his interest in early Mormon religious practices such as the United Order and plural marriage, other leaders in the Third Convention expelled him from their movement.

Though most of the Third Convention reconciled with and rejoined the church in 1946, Bautista abstained. Instead of rejoining the mainline church, in 1947 Bautista founded a colonia called Colonia Industrial de la Nueva Jerusalén, and he organized and led his own Mormon denomination in which he reintroduced the United Order and plural marriage. Bautista died in 1961, but his church and colonia survive to the present day.

== Early life ==
Margarito Bautista was born in San Miguel de Atlautla, Mexico State, Mexico on June 10, 1878. His family, along with the village of San Miguel de Atlautla, were bilingual and spoke both Nahuatl and Spanish. Bautista grew up Catholic, but he was also familiar with the teachings of a Mexican Methodist minister in the area. However, Bautista found neither Catholicism nor Methodism spiritually satisfying. Nevertheless, based on the religious example of his mother Petra Candelaria Valencia, he had a sense of spiritual commitment to and interest in God.

Not much is known or was recorded about Margarito Bautista's childhood or his siblings. Shortly before Valencia died, she urged him to work to ordain the people of Mexico.

== Conversion and membership ==
In 1901, Latter-day Saint missionary Ammon Tenney visited Bautista and his family, and Bautista became interested in being baptized into The Church of Jesus Christ of Latter-day Saints. Bautista's father Luz disapproved of this and kicked Bautista out of his house. In a few months, Bautista became very sick and was welcomed back home where Tenney visited and ministered to Bautista with a priesthood blessing, after which Bautista recovered. After that experience, Margarito further investigated the church and was baptized. After his baptism, Bautista worked closely with Tenney to preach and convert Mexicans, as he received further ordinations to Latter-day Saint priesthood offices and was ordained an elder by December 1901. Margarito received many job offers to work with other faiths as he gained a reputation for his preaching, but he preferred preaching for the LDS Church.

Around the time of Bautista's conversion, large numbers Latter-day Saints lived in Mexico in settlements, the results of a colonization project started in the late-nineteenth century. Church leaders had encouraged members to settle in Mexico to avoid prosecution by the federal government of the United States for practicing plural marriage, a form of religious polygyny, in violation of anti-polygamy laws. Interested in foreign economic investment, Mexican president Porfirio Díaz had encouraged the immigration. In the early 1900s, the church was in the middle of a transition between endorsing plural marriage and ending it, so many Anglo-American Latter-day Saints still lived in Mexico in "Mormon colonies."

Bautista spent time living in these Latter-day Saint settlements, moving between multiple Mexican colonies and becoming introduced to the practice of polygamy. Bautista even practiced polygamy himself to maintain his position as a teacher. While living in Mexican-Mormon colonies, Bautista further invested in the church, and he wrote about his faith journey, eventually becoming published in the church's official magazine for male youth, the Improvement Era.

Bautista eventually left Mexico and moved to Salt Lake City, Utah, where LDS Church headquarters were located, effectively living in the center of church activity. While in Salt Lake City, Bautista continued studying genealogy and Latter-day Saint theology, but he also studied polygamy and other controversial doctrines. The church also called Bautista to serve as the first branch president of the Temporary Lamanite Branch, later renamed Lucero Ward.

From 1922 to 1924, the church assigned Bautista to serve as a genealogical missionary in Mexico, a calling he embraced and gained great fulfillment from. He taught Mexican Latter-day Saints about temple work, and he organized local genealogical societies. During this time, Bautista also began more openly teaching interpretations of the Book of Mormon and of Latter-day Saint doctrine that took inspiration from Mexican nationalism. When Bautista trained administrators for genealogical society, he encouraged them to believe in Mexicans' potential for religious triumph over Anglo-Americans and Europeans.

However, the church's Anglo-American leadership disapproved of Bautista's nationalist interpretations of doctrine. Rey L. Pratt, the president of the Spanish-American Mission, went so far as to preach two "anti-Bautista" sermons in 1923 and 1925. In the first sermon, Pratt was gentle, but in 1925 he spoke with noticeable anger.

In 1924, Bautista concluded his genealogical mission and returned to Utah. Because of his controversial teachings, church leadership withdrew official callings from Bautista from 1925 onward.

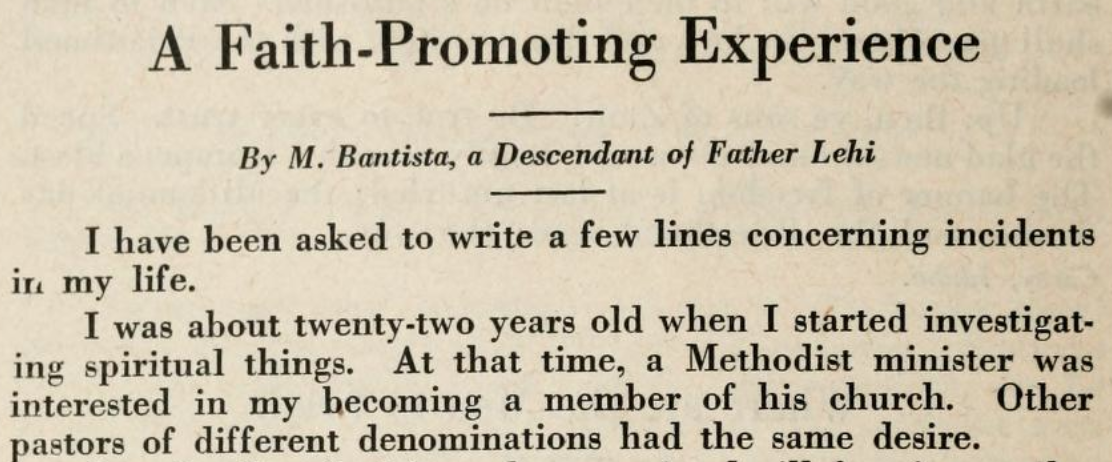
In this excerpt from an Improvement Era article he wrote in 1920, Bautista called himself a "Descendant of Father Lehi." According to the Book of Mormon, Lehi was the father of Laman and Lemuel, the progenitors of the Lamanites.

=== La Evolución de Mexico ===
After Bautista finished his mission in Mexico, he found himself without an official leadership role in the church and thus without a position from which to preach Latter-day Saint doctrine. Still yearning to proselytize to Mexicans, Bautista wrote La evolución de Mexico: sus verdaderos progenitores y su origen: el destino de America y Europa while living in Utah over a period of about five years, from 1930 to 1935. The 500-page book was a theological treatise that established Mexicans' origins and predicted their future and destiny.

==== Church claims about Lamanite ancestry ====
To explicate Mexican origins, Bautista used the Book of Mormon, the central religious text of The Church of Jesus Christ of Latter-day Saints, which implied that the indigenous peoples of the Americas were descendants of the Lamanites described in the text, themselves descendants of ancient Israelites. Church leaders in the late-nineteenth and early-twentieth centuries generally took this claim seriously and often used the word "Lamanite" to refer to indigenous peoples in North and South America. This could sometimes be understood as an epithet, as Book of Mormon narrators often described Lamanites pejoratively as degenerate or fallen, and Anglo-American Latter-day Saints in Bautista's lifetime typically imagined Lamanites through the lens of their stereotypes about American Indians as "dark, degenerate, and savage." At other times, however, Latter-day Saint ecclesiastical leaders and missionaries used Lamanite tropes as a missionary tactic and focused on the Book of Mormon's promises of choice blessings to the Lamanites as a way to build bridges with and draw converts among American Indians and Latin Americans.

==== Bautista's use of Lamanite identity in La evolución ====
Bautista also took the idea of Lamanite ancestry seriously—he even called himself "a Descendant of Father Lehi"—but he did not use Lamanite identity pejoratively. Instead, Bautista used the Book of Mormon and other Latter-day Saint teachings about Lamanites selectively, focusing on promised blessings and claims of pre-conquest Christianity, much as missionaries might. In La evolución, Bautista also fused Lamanite identity with post-revolutionary Mexican nationalism, going on to claim that Mexicans were literal descendants of Abraham, Israelites, and Lamanites and had a birthright privilege to the Book of Mormon's choicest blessings, meaning Mexicans would someday lead the church religiously while Mexico would lead the world politically. Bautista even urged the United States to return previously-Mexican territory in the American West, including Utah, to Mexico on these grounds of Mexico's religious and political destiny. Bautista's La evolución therefore challenged Anglo-American church leaders' control over the affairs of Mexican Latter-day Saints. Simultaneously, Bautista advocated for all Mexicans to convert to the LDS Church, become Latter-day Saints, and fulfill their divine destiny as Lamanites.

Because Bautista made a case for all Mexicans to join the church, he hoped church leaders would reward him for writing the book and even help publish it. When Bautista approached church leaders in Utah, however, they rejected La evolución on the grounds that it made claims beyond the scope of official doctrine. Church leadership refused to help publish the book.

== Schism and leadership ==
Disillusioned by the institutional church's rejection of La Evolución, Bautista moved with his family back to Mexico and there found support from local Latter-day Saints to publish the book between 1935 and 1936. Among Mexican-Hispanic Latter-day Saints, Bautista's La Evolución became popular and highly influential, as it tapped into Mexican Latter-day Saints' national pride concurrent with the post-revolutionary nationalism common in Mexico at the time. By coincidence, in 1936 the church also announced it would divide the Spanish-American Mission—a missiological geographic organization unit—into two missions, creating a Mexican Mission and therefore signaling the church would call a new mission president to lead the mission. Mexican Latter-day Saints had already twice requested that the church call a native Mexican to lead the Spanish-American Mission—and by corollary the congregations in Mexico—and Bautista's book stirred in them a hope that the church would take their requests into account and call a Mexican to lead the Mexican Mission.

=== Third Convention ===
In April 1936, the church instead appointed Harold Pratt, a Euro-American who was Mexican by citizenship, and it publicly denounced La evolución, dismaying many Mexican Latter-day Saints. Rallying around the message of Bautista's La Evolución, about 120 church members gathered in an unofficial meeting in Mexico City called the Third Convention, following a pattern set by two past mass meetings held to discuss the Mexican Latter-day Saints' relationship to the church headquartered in the United States. Bautista was among the leaders of this Third Convention. The Convention participants (also called convencionistas) petitioned explicitly for their mission president to be Mexican by "race and blood." Supposing that church leaders were simply unfamiliar with Mexican Latter-day Saints' qualifications to be mission presidents, the Convention discussed possible candidates for mission president instead of Pratt to suggest to church leadership, and Pratt even agreed to deliver their petition. At one point, the Convention nominated Bautista to be mission president, but he declined, and the Convention instead named Bautista's nephew Abel Páez as their requested new mission president.

Pratt delivered the petition as promised, but church leadership reacted sternly. The First Presidency's message declared the Third Convention and previous unofficial meetings inappropriate and out of order and affirmed that church-appointed leaders represented the church to the membership, rather than representing the membership to church leaders. Church leaders also rejected Bautista's claim in La evolución that Mexicans had a religious birthright as descendants of Lamanites and of Abraham. Church leadership even attempted to suppress La evolución's circulation among Mexican church members.

Bautista attempted to deny his role as a leader in the Third Convention, but Ester Ontiveros, a Mexican missionary for the LDS Church, revealed to Pratt a letter that Bautista had sent her which exposed him. The church excommunicated Bautista and other Convention leaders like his nephew Páez for rebellion and apostasy. However, within the year almost a third of the 3,000 Latter-day Saints in Mexico left the Church to follow Bautista and other excommunicated Convention leaders as a dissident Third Convention movement. Bautista and the other convencionistas resolved to continue gathering and worshipping as Latter-day Saints by forming their own independent Mormon sect, this time led by full-blooded Mexicans.

=== Independent break-off ===
Although the convencionista break-off focused predominantly on questions of indigenous leadership and did not differ from mainline Latter-day Saint teachings outside of embracing La Evolución, a few weeks into the schism Bautista began proposing more pronounced divergence. Bautista was familiar with earlier church practices of the United Order and plural marriage, forms of cooperative economics and religious polygyny respectively, and he believed that while the mainline church had abandoned such activities, the Mexican sect should revive their practice. Most other convencionistas were not as enthusiastic about older Latter-day Saint practices, however, and many actually hoped to rejoin the mainline church someday. By the end of 1937, the convencionista sect expelled Bautista from their movement, though he stayed in contact with them. For the next several years, Bautista wrote and published theological pamphlets encouraging Mexican Latter-day Saints to leave the mainline church and join the convencionistas.

In 1942, Bautista moved to Ozumba, Mexico, and he began making contact with bankers, Mexican legislators, and even President Lázaro Cárdenas to gather land and resources to support his own colonia settlement project.

In 1946, the Third Convention movement returned to the mainline church, ending their schism. Bautista, however, remained aloof from the church, and he excoriated the convencionistas as "Iscariots" and "devils" who yielded to the "ambition of the white man." To Bautista, by rejoining the America-headquartered mainline church, the Third Convention had abandoned Mexico's nationalist birthright as inheritors to Lamanite and Israelite prophecies.

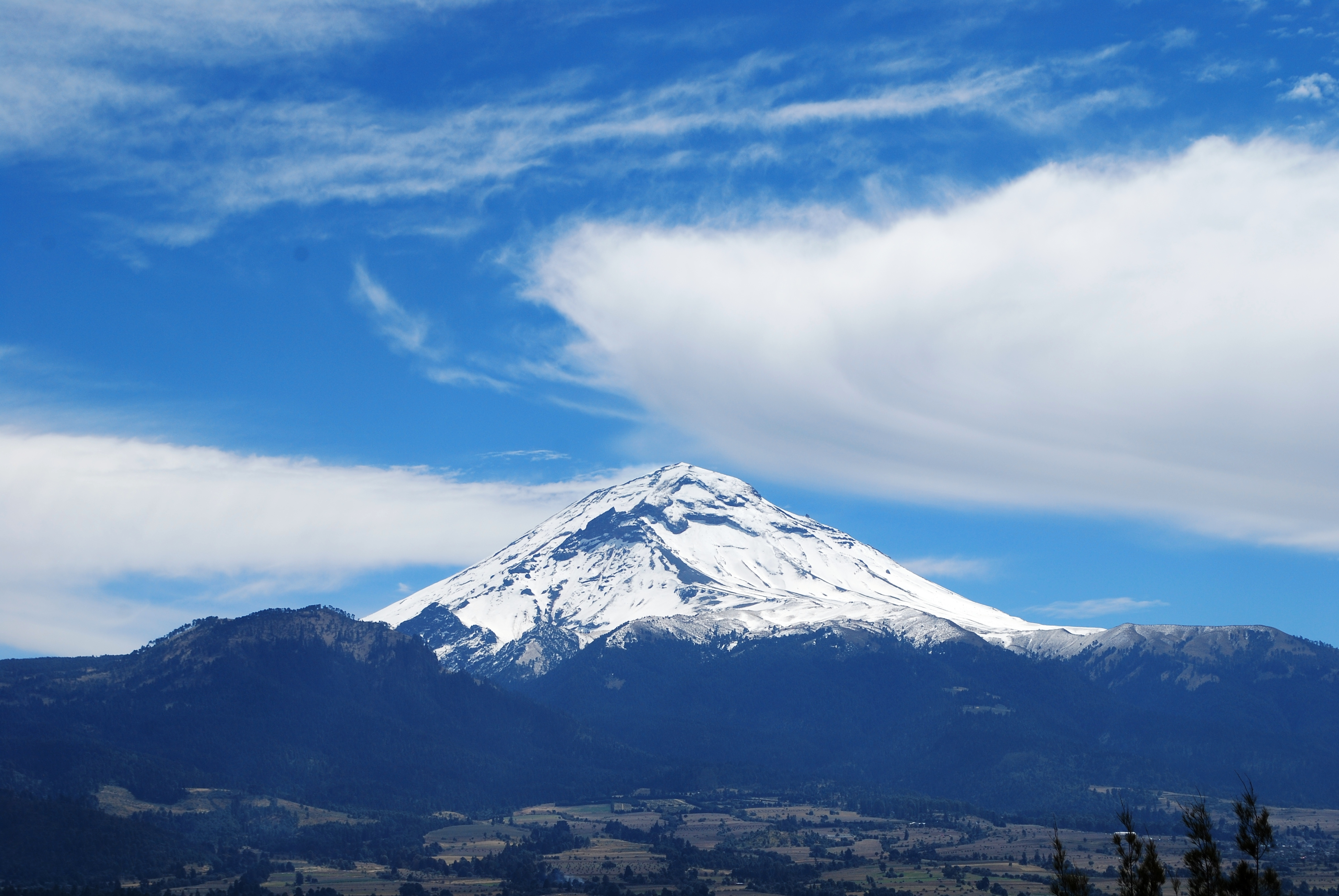
Bautista founded Colonia Industrial/Nueva Jerusalén, his take on a Mormon utopian society, on the mountainside of Popocatéptl in Ozumba, Mexico.

=== Colonia Industrial de la Nueva Jerusalén ===
Bautista was not the only Mexican-Mormon unsatisfied with the 1946 reconciliation of the LDS Church and Third Convention. In August 1947, fifty-nine convencionistas and four leaders (Lorenzo Cuautli, Leonardo Belmont, Francisco Sandoval, and Candido de la Cruz) who also abstained from the reconciliation joined Bautista in the municipality of Ozumba. There, Bautista founded Colonia Industrial de la Nueva Jerusalén (Colonia Industrial), their own independent community named for the New Jerusalem. Most of Colonia Industrial's original members left when they could not obtain employment, but Bautista remained, and enough of the community was left that it continued.

Under Bautista's leadership, Colonia Industrial practiced communitarian economics inspired by the early church's United Order, placing private property in a community trust that titled deeds back to families based on need. Colonia Industrial also practiced plural marriage, though Bautista applied a strict set of rules of his own creation to guide the program, including a thirty-seven-point set of instructions on plural courtship. For example, only men already sealed to a single woman could enter the practice of plural marriage, and after selecting a second wife, he had to prove his fidelity to his first wife for five years without courting the second woman in order to qualify for the practice.

Colonia Industrial became fractious sometimes, and historian Jason Dormady wrote, "Like most utopian experiments, it was a train wreck." Shared property and plural marriage sparked some strife, and a food warehouse was even destroyed in an act of arson. Despite these bumps, however, Colonia Industrial persisted, and under Bautista's leadership it eventually thrived.

Bautista died on August 4, 1961, at the age of eighty-three.

== Legacy ==
=== Influence among Latter-day Saints ===
Bautista's proselytization as a genealogical missionary meaningfully increased Mexican Latter-day Saints' interest in their family history. Before the LDS Church and its colonies were established in Mexico, a majority of the people did not know much about their ancestors or about genealogy.

In his histories of Latter-day Saints in Mexico, F. Lamond Tullis portrays Bautista as a "malcontent" who challenged leadership too often and caused some members to leave the church, and Bautista's clashes with church leaders and his excommunication loom large in the memory of him.

Nevertheless, Bautista's teachings left a strong impression on Mormons in Mexico—including Latter-day Saints—and in the early twentieth century Bautista's La evolución may have been more popular than even the Book of Mormon. Bautista's interpretation of Lamanite identity also continued to be highly influential in spite of and long after his excommunication. For example, Agrícol Lozano Herrera—a prominent Mexican Latter-day Saint writer and poet who served in several church callings such as stake president, mission president, and temple president—embraced Lamanite identity just as Bautista did and, also like Bautista, averred that Mexicans had a special role as descendants of the House of Israel, demonstrating that some of Bautista's ideas remain current among Mexican Latter-day Saints.

Brigham Young University, a university affiliated with and sponsored by the LDS Church, holds a three-box Margarito Bautista papers collection in its L. Tom Perry Special Collections library.

=== Colonia Industrial and El Reino de Dios en su Plenitud ===
In the mid-to-late-twentieth century, most Latter-day Saints and scholars of Mormon history believed Bautista's sect and Colonia Industrial had dwindled away after his death and nearly collapsed by 1983, based on a claim from Lozano. However, in 1996, anthropologist Thomas W. Murphy visited Ozumba and discovered the Colonia Industrial community still existed and several hundred residents still lived there. The religious sect Bautista founded had adopted the legal name of El Reino de Dios en su Plenitud (The Kingdom of God in its Fulness), though members called themselves Mormons.

Colonia Industrial and El Reino de Dios still exist to this day. As recently as 2011, 800 people still live in Colonia Industrial, hold property in common through a community trust, and practice plural marriage, continuing Bautista's teachings.

== See also ==
- Anti-clericalism in Mexico
- List of denominations in the Latter Day Saint Movement
- Religion in Mexico
- The Church of Jesus Christ of Latter-day Saints in Mexico
- Third Convention
