= Thomas W. Murphy (anthropologist) =

American anthropologist (born c. 1967)

Thomas W. Murphy (born c. 1967) is an American anthropologist and writer. His work has focused on environmental issues and various topics related to The Church of Jesus Christ of Latter-day Saints.

== Biography ==
Murphy is a Latter-day Saint. He earned a Ph.D. in anthropology from the University of Washington in 2003. As of 2013, he teaches in the Department of Anthropology at Edmonds Community College in Washington state. He founded the Learn and Serve Environmental Anthropology Field (LEAF) School in 2006. The LEAF School offers field-based service-learning courses in human ecology and archaeology and specializes in the application of traditional ecological knowledge to sustainability projects. The Washington Association of Conservation Districts selected Murphy as its Conservation Educator of the Year in 2011. The Puget Sound Regional Council selected the Japanese Gulch Fish Passage Project in 2012 for a Vision 2040 Award, highlighting the anthropology and archaeology field training led by Murphy.

His academic publications focus on wildlife corridors, social marketing, environmental education, and Mormon representations of Native Americans. In 1997, he located an isolated LDS faction in Mexico of the Third Convention group, which scholars previously believed to have died out decades earlier. Murphy's research has been published in the Journal for the Scientific Study of Religion; Ethnohistory; the Journal of Mormon History; the Review of Religious Research; Dialogue: A Journal of Mormon Thought; Sunstone; Social Science Research Network, and the 2002 book American Apocrypha: More Essays on the Book of Mormon, edited by Brent Lee Metcalfe and Dan Vogel.

=== Contact with Colonia Industrial ===
In 1996, while researching in Mexico for an unrelated ethnobiology project, Murphy visited Ozumba in the hopes of meeting and interviewing relatives of Margarito Bautista, a Mexican Mormon theologian and preacher whose history Murphy had been researching. Bautista was a leader in the Third Convention temporary break-off group before being expelled from the group for his comparatively radical interests in reviving early Church practices such as plural marriage and the communitarian economics of the United Order. Bautista went on to found his own church movement along with a colonia in Ozumba, but most scholars in Mormon history believed the community had dwindled away in the 1980s, partly based on claims from Mexican Latter-day Saint Agrícol Lozano Herrera. However, in 1996 Murphy discovered that Bautista's colonia and church community still existed, organized as Colonia Industrial de la Nueva Jerusalén (Colonia Industrial) and El Reino de Dios en su Plenitud (The Kingdom of God in its Fulness).

=== "Lamanite Genesis" essay ===
Murphy drew attention in the media and from the leadership of the Church of Jesus Christ of Latter-day Saints (LDS Church) after the publication of his essay, "Lamanite Genesis, Genealogy, and Genetics" in the 2002 book American Apocrypha. This essay discusses the genetic evidence for the geographic origin and lineage of Native American groups. It relies on evidence regarding mitochondrial DNA, which is inherited directly from the mother; the Y chromosome, inherited from the father; and nuclear DNA.

Murphy posited that DNA evidence suggests that Native Americans are descendants of individuals from northeastern Siberia—corroborating conclusions that anthropologists have long held. He notes the 99.6 percent absence of genetic heritage outside of known indigenous Native American haplogroups. (The remaining 0.4 percent is near-universally agreed among anthropologists and biologists studying the issue to represent genetic markers that were introduced after the year 1492.)

In his essay, Murphy writes that DNA and other research contradicts numerous LDS doctrinal claims, such as that Native Americans are descended from Middle Eastern people who immigrated to the Americas c. 600 BC:

From a scientific perspective, the BoMor's [Book of Mormon's] origin is best situated in early 19th century America, not ancient America. There were no Lamanites prior to c. 1828 and dark skin is not a physical trait of God's malediction. Native Americans do not need to accept Christianity or the BoMor to know their own history. The BoMor emerged from Joseph Smith's own struggles with his God. Mormons need to look inward for spiritual validation and cease efforts to remake Native Americans in their own image.

Murphy concluded that "DNA research lends no support to traditional Mormon beliefs about the origins of Native Americans" and he has likened the Book of Mormon to inspirational fiction. Murphy has reaffirmed this point several times since the initial publication of his essay in interviews and in videos produced by Living Hope Ministries, a Utah-based evangelical Christian ministry that produces literature and films that question and criticize Mormonism.

In a review in 2006, the FARMS Institute responded to Murphy's claims.

==== Subsequent events ====
Murphy's review of genetic research was expanded upon by molecular biologist Simon Southerton, a former Mormon bishop, with his study Losing a Lost Tribe: Native Americans DNA, and the Mormon Church, Signature Books, 2004, which gives a more complete accounting of the current status of Polynesians and Native Americans in context with national studies, Mormon scholars and concessions by geneticists from BYU. Other researchers such as Scott Woodward are critical of Southerton's work.

In response to the publication of "Lamanite Genesis, Genealogy, and Genetics", Murphy's LDS stake president asked him to either recant his position regarding DNA evidence and the Book of Mormon or resign his membership in the LDS Church. Murphy declined both suggestions, so Latimer scheduled a disciplinary council for December 8, 2002. Such a council might have resulted in Murphy's disfellowshipment or excommunication from the church.

Murphy's situation received widespread media attention and generated protest actions from some Mormon intellectual groups. On December 7, 2002, less than 24 hours before the scheduled meeting time, Latimer indefinitely postponed Murphy's disciplinary council. Finally, on February 23, 2003, Latimer informed Murphy that all disciplinary action was placed on permanent hold. In a note Murphy sent to several supporters for wide public distribution, Murphy expressed hope that other scholars in similar positions might benefit from Latimer's decision:

We hope that other stake presidents will follow this most recent example of President Latimer and likewise refrain from using the threat of excommunication as tool for disciplining scholars.

== Works ==
- Murphy, Thomas W., "Brief Summary of Jetty Island History" (May 6, 2008). SSRN 2177737.
- —— "Double Helix: Reading Scripture in a Genomic Age" (September 19, 2003). SSRN 2203585
- —— "Inventing Galileo." Sunstone, March 2004: 58–61. SSRN 2203605
- —— Imagining Lamanites: Native Americans and the Book of Mormon, Ph.D. dissertation, University of Washington, 2003. SSRN 2177734
- —— "Simply Implausible: DNA and a Mesoamerican Setting for the Book of Mormon." Dialogue: A Journal of Mormon Thought 36(4) [Winter, 2003]: 109–131. SSRN 2177709
- ——, "Sin, Skin, and Seed: Mistakes of Men in the Book of Mormon (March 24, 2004)." John Whitmer Historical Association Journal 25 (2005): 36–51. SSRN 2177700
- —— "Lamanite Genesis, Genealogy, and Genetics." In Vogel, Dan and Brent Metcalfe, eds. American Apocrypha: Essays on the Book of Mormon Salt Lake City: Signature, 2002: 47–77. ISBN 1-56085-151-1 – Online reprint at MormonScriptureStudies.com
- ——, Blaustein, Peter, Richards, Susie, Burt, Chris and Johnson, Amy, "Washington Watershed Education Teacher Training (WWETT) Program: Progress Report, 10/1/10–9/30/11" (November 26, 2012). SSRN 2181105
- ——, Blaustein, Peter, Richards, Susie, Burt, Chris and Johnson, Amy, "Washington Watershed Education Teacher Training (WWETT) Program: Progress Report 10/1/09–9/30/10" (November 26, 2012). SSRN 2181138
- ——, Green, Penny and Quirk, Lisa, "A Rapid Ethnographic Assessment of the Septic Industry in Snohomish County, Washington" (April 29, 2009). SSRN 2177683
- —— and Southerton, Simon. "Genetic Research a 'Galileo Event' for Mormons." Anthropology News 44(2) (February 2003): 20 SSRN 2203607

== See also ==
- Criticism of Mormonism
- Simon Southerton – Molecular biologist excommunicated by the LDS Church, co-authored article with Murphy
