= Third Convention =

Schism in the Latter-day Saint movement

The Third Convention was a dissident group of Mexican Latter-day Saints (Mormons) who broke away from the main body of church authority in 1936 over a dispute about local governance and autonomy of the Church of Jesus Christ of Latter-day Saints in Mexico.

== Origin ==
A contributing cause of the dissension may have been the Cristero War of 1926–1929, a counter-revolutionary movement against certain anti-clerical provisions of the 1917 Mexican Constitution. These provisions had expelled foreign clergy from Mexico, resulting in isolation of Mexican Mormons from their church's headquarters in Salt Lake City, Utah.

As a result, a group of Mexican Mormons led by Abel Páez, first counselor of the Mexican district presidency, demanded that church leadership appoint a Mexican mission president "of pure race and blood" (de pura raza y sangre). After three rebuffs, a breakaway faction of the Mexican mission district organized what came to be known as the Third Convention, separate from and without authority from church leadership in the United States. These "Third Conventionists" (as they were known) conducted missionary activity in some small mountain villages in central Mexico.

== Outcome ==
Several members of the Third Convention were temporarily excommunicated by the LDS Church during the period in which it was active, although most of these were changed to the lesser punishment of disfellowshipment by Prophet George Albert Smith in 1946, signaling a compromise. Rapprochement continued with President Smith's visit to Mexico that year, resulting in most Third Conventionists returning to the fellowship of the LDS Church.

== Current status ==
Though scholars had believed the Third Convention movement had died out by the 1970s and '80s, anthropologist Thomas W. Murphy located an active Third Conventionist community in Ozumba, Mexico in 1996. The group was situated in Colonia Industrial, founded in 1947 as the community of Margarito Bautista, a prominent Third Conventionist. As of 2011, there are 800 people living in Colonia Industrial, and all are members of a church officially named El Reino de Dios en su Plenitud (The Kingdom of God in its Fullness), though adherents preferred to call themselves "Mormons." The group practiced plural marriage and communal principles of the law of consecration, and seemed to be moderately affluent. They were affiliated with the Apostolic United Brethren Mormon fundamentalist church, and saw Owen Allred as a prophet.

Another Third Conventionist group about 300 strong, also rediscovered by Murphy in 1997, exists in San Gabriel Ometotztla, Puebla. It is called La Iglesia de los Santos de la Plenitud de los Tiempos (The Church of Jesus Christ of the Saints of the Fullness of Times).

== See also ==
- Mormon colonies in Mexico
- The Church of Jesus Christ of Latter-day Saints in Mexico
- Margarito Bautista
