= Colonia Díaz =

- Ghost town, Former Mormon colony
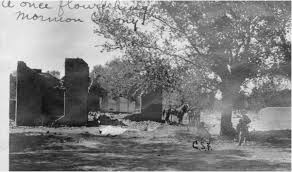
- Remaining building in Colonia Díaz, 1916.

- Location of Colonia Díaz in Chihuahua
- Coordinates: 31°10′0″N 108°0′0″W
- Country: Mexico
- State: Chihuahua
- Settled: May, 1885
- Founder: Mormon pioneers
- Named for: Mexican president Porfirio Díaz

Area
  - Total: 140 km^{2} (53 sq mi)
- Elevation: 473 m (1,551 ft)

Population (1912)
  - Total: 1,000
  - Density: 7.3/km^{2} (19/sq mi)
- Currently uninhabited

Colonia Díaz was the first permanent Mormon colony in Mexico, located along the Casas Grandes River in the northwest of the state of Chihuahua, Mexico. It is now a ghost town bordered on the east by the Sierra Madre Occidental. It was the nearest colony to the Mexico–United States border. By 1900, Díaz had grown to 623 inhabitants. In 1912, during the Mexican Revolution, Colonia Díaz was intentionally burned and destroyed. Other neighboring colonies were established after Colonia Díaz in the late 19th century, of which only Colonia Dublán, sixty miles south of Colonia Díaz, and Colonia Juárez, 18 miles southeast of Colonia Dublán, are still inhabited.

Humans have lived in the Casas Grandes area for at least 1,900 years. The Mormon settlement was established in 1885 mostly to provide refuge for plural families escaping the Morrill Anti-Bigamy Act, especially after the 1878 Reynolds v. United States ruling against polygamy. Therefore, Colonia Díaz is an early example of a planned community. Farming and stock raising became an important economic factor in the valley during the colonists' presence. By the time Colonia Díaz was ransacked during the Mexican Revolution, the colony had approximately 300 families. By the 1st of August 1912, all American families had left Colonia Díaz, none of which returned.

== History ==
Prior to the arrival of settlers in late-19th century, the Apache people lived in the Casas Grandes valley along the river of the same name. Mexican hunters and trappers avoided the area because of fear for the Apaches. The first Mormon pioneers to settle in Mexico established temporary camps adjacent to the Casas Grandes River. Within weeks Colonia Díaz was established as the first permanent Mormon colony in Mexico. The name came from then Mexican President Porfirio Díaz, whose general policy encouraged foreign colonization. No report has been found of clashes between the Apache Indians and the Mormon colonizers. In 1888 settlers then founded Colonia Dublán, 80 kilometres (50 mi) south of Colonia Díaz. By mid-1890 the settlers in Díaz had planted some 2000 shade trees, 15,000 fruit trees and 5,000 grape vines in the fertile soil of the Casas Grandes valley, where Colonia Díaz was established. All orchards and pastures surrounded the community, which consisted of a compact grid of about 140 blocks. None of the Mormon colonies had local political leadership. All civil decisions were made locally by LDS bishops and the Stake President. A request was submitted in 1911 to then Chihuahua governor Abraham González for town leadership for Colonia Juarez, Colonia Dublán and Colonia Díaz. The decision for self-government was postponed and never reached due to the civil unrest of the Mexican Revolution centered in Chihuahua.

Mormon settlers in Mexico maintained friendly relationships with President Díaz. In 1901 colony leaders made two visit to the Mexican President reporting on the settlers industry, education and economic development. Although considered a dictator by the LDS communities, Díaz was praised for his religious tolerance. It probably was that favorable relationship with the President that caused Colonia Díaz to be the only Mormon colony to be completely burned to the ground during the Mexican Revolution.

=== Pre-Columbian culture ===
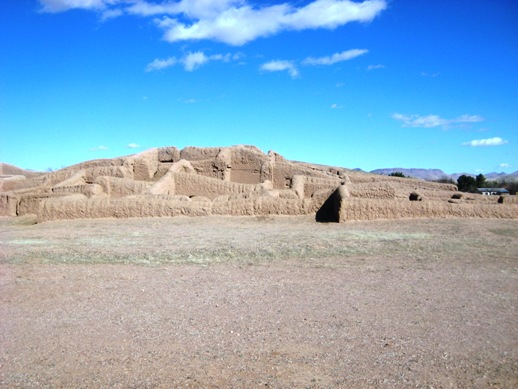
Adobe dwellings from the early Paquimé era with an enclosing wall.

The largest identified settlement in Northern Chihuahua is known today as Paquimé or Casas Grandes. Casas Grandes was probably a backwater until about 1200 CE when pochteca (traders) from the Aztec empire or other Mesoamerican states to the south turned it into a major trading center. A diametrically opposed theory is that Casas Grandes was established by the elites of the Anasazi from the north who were fleeing their homeland during its decline. A third theory speculates that Casas Grandes is a community that grew over time to dominate its region and adopted some religious and social customs from the civilizations of Mesoamerica. The language the inhabitants of Casas Grandes spoke is unknown. Given the Mesoamerican influence on Casas Grandes Nahuatl was probably widely spoken but it was not the primary language of the people.

For unknown reasons, Casas Grandes was abandoned in about 1450. In 1565 nearby Indians, non-agricultural nomads, probably Suma or Jano, told The Spanish explorer Francisco de Ibarra that a war with village dwellers, the Opata, four days journey west had caused the abandonment of Casas Grandes and that the inhabitants had moved six days journey north. That suggests the people of Casas Grandes joined the Pueblos on the Rio Grande in New Mexico. The Casas Grandes people might've also migrated west to Sonora and joined or became the Opata whom the Spaniards found in the mid-16th century living in small but well-organized city states called “statelets.” It is also possible that Casas Grandes was abandoned because opportunities were greater elsewhere. Other communities in the Southwest are known to have been abandoned in favor of a new home.

=== First missionaries ===
Brigham Young, the president of The Church of Jesus Christ of Latter-day Saints at the time, sent an expedition of missionaries led by Dan W. Jones to Mexico to investigate the possibility of preaching to the Mexican communities and to search for probable settlement options. The missionaries met with several local and regional officials and found a favorable opinion. Mexican president Porfirio Díaz was also known to encourage foreign settlements. This friendly environment encouraged settling first in Arizona through the end of the 1870s. After Young's death, the settling projects in Mexico shifted from a proselyting foundation towards finding a refuge for families that had adopted plural marriage and felt threatened by the US Government's prosecution of polygamists. Even though plural marriage was illegal in Mexico, government officials welcomed the benefits of foreign investments and colonization by Americans and their resources, ignoring their cultural differences.

In January 1885, LDS President John Taylor visited the Mexican states of Sonora and Chihuahua, selecting the Casas Grandes valley for the place where settlements were to be established. Several ambassadors were sent from Salt Lake City to negotiate purchasing of the lands and for official arrangements of foreign colonists to be accepted in Chihuahua. In May 1885 approximately 400 prospective settlers, mostly plural marriage families from Arizona established temporary camps on the shores of Casas Grandes River. Most of the settlers arrived before land negotiations were completed. They were forced to wait in their temporary camps, where money, resources and comfort were compromised. Within weeks most colonists in Casas Grandes were reduced to poverty and sickness. Surprisingly, President Díaz interceded in behalf of the colonists, which lead to the first official settlement, named by their intercessor: Colonia Díaz.

=== Mexican Revolution ===
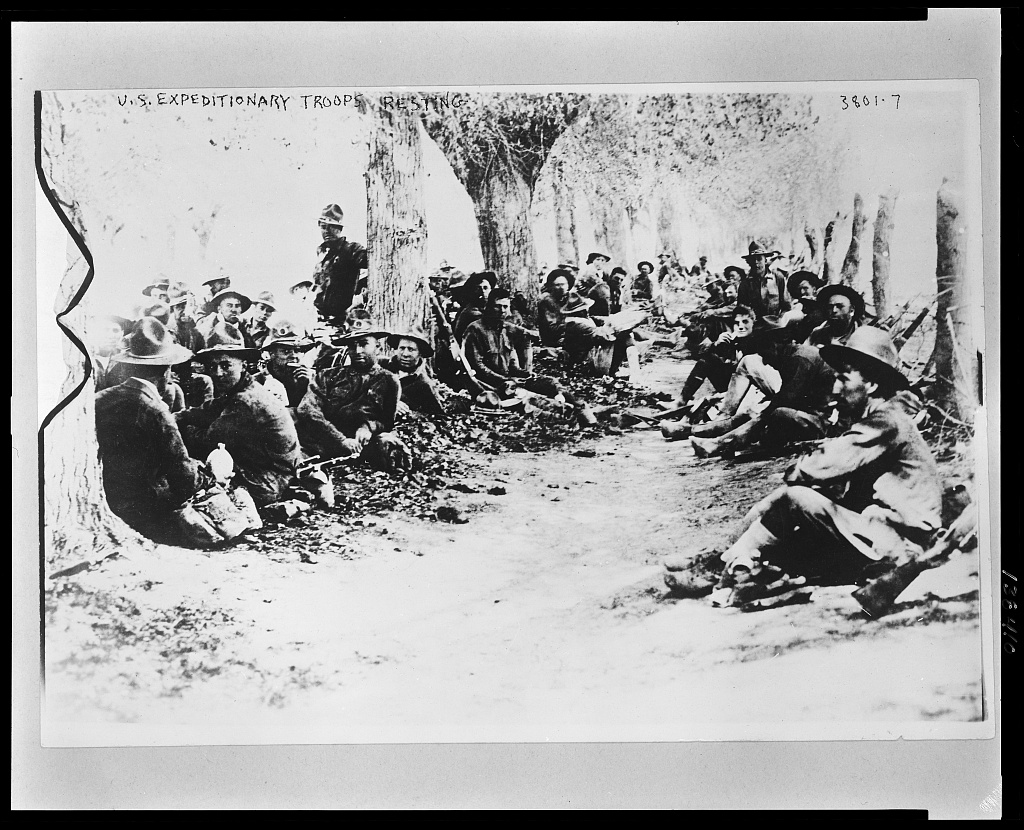
U.S. Army Expeditionary troops of the 16th Inf. resting in Colonia Diaz, 1916.

In February 1911, Francisco I. Madero entered the state of Chihuahua from his brief exile in the US border and led 130 men in an attack on Casas Grandes, south of the Mormon colonies, initiating the Mexican Revolution. Up to that point, the Mormon colonists had established a friendly relationship with their Mexican neighbors. During the initiation of Madero's revolt, there were some efforts made by local officers to enlist the loyalty of the Mormon settlers to the federal ranks. Nevertheless, the settlers maintained a position of neutrality during the developments surrounding them. The LDS Church's headquarters had also endorsed a policy of strict neutrality. The unstable conditions in the Country didn't affect the Mormon colonies much, except for occasional stealing of pasture fences, horses and cattle used mostly for beef. Madero was actually known to produce receipts for the confiscated goods taken from the colonists, in case the Revolution triumphed. There were no reports of plundering by the Federal Government.

Strain in Chihuahua increased after the fallout of Pascual Orozco from Madero's ranks. Orozco's rebellion was funded mostly from confiscated livestock, which he sold in Texas, and where he bought weapons and ammunition. Once it was known that the Mormon settlers had arms, a small force of 35 men led by Enrique Portillo was sent among the colonies to disarm them. On July 12, 1912 a rebel leader by the last name of Arriola confiscated all the flour from Colonia Díaz gristmill and ordered their guns to be surrendered by the next day. Thomas D. Edwards, the U.S. Consul at Ciudad Juárez, approved the refusal of giving arms and ammunition to the revolutionary forces. The colonists' senior official, Junius Romney, met with the rebels' leader Amador Salazar about the issue of the taking arms against the colonists' will. Salazar agreed to leave the colonies alone on condition that they didn't interfere with the revolution. Salazar and Orozco had signed guaranties for the colonies.

A few weeks later the violence intensified in Chihuahua leading to more rebel groups staking the colonies in search for weapons and other goods. On a train trip to El Paso, Texas on July 14, Salazar told Romney that tensions escalated with the American colonists because of his belief that the US Government had made alliances with Mexican president Madero. In El Paso, Romney was instructed by LDS apostle and former Casas Grandes colonist Anthony W. Ivins to make decisions on behalf of the colonies should violence escalated too quickly. On July 17, LDS President Joseph F. Smith and the First Presidency sent a wire agreeing that the course pursued by the Mormon colonists ought to be determined by Romney and his Stake leadership. Finally, in the end of July 1912 Salazar called upon Romney to inform him that he had withdrawn all guaranties favoring the colonies. Orozco had given the order that no American in Mexican soil could be allowed to own weapons.

The raid began in Colonia Dublán with the looting of the Union Mercantile Bank. Romeny agreed with the colonists to give up their weapons and ammunition. All families were driven from Colonia Díaz on July 28. Colonia Juarez came next in the raid on July 29, followed by Colonia Pacheco. During the collection of weapons, the Mormon colonists began shipping the women and children off their lands. The decision was made locally, since the colony leaders felt it was too dangerous to wait for confirmation from Salt Lake City. The rebels fled to the mountains on July 31 while the Mexican Army appeared and engaged as many rebels remained in the valley. Some colonists returned to Colonia Juarez and Dublán. The state of destruction in Colonia Díaz was so large, no colonist ever returned to that land.

== Geography ==
Colonia Díaz was established in a flat within the Casas Grandes valley, 40 miles directly south of the Mexico–United States border and 18 miles from the border at the point where the boundary line makes a square angle of Arizona. The area has no mountains within a radius of approximately 15 miles. The Sierra Madre Occidental that divides the states of Sonora and Chihuahua is about 50 miles from where Ciudad Díaz was located. The Casas Grandes River ran through Colonia Díaz from the southwest in a southeastern direction.

A few natural disasters hit the area where the Mormon colonies were established. The 1887 Sonora earthquake caused landslides and fires in the mountains affecting mostly the colonies settled on the Sierra Madre Occidental. Some houses in Colonia Díaz suffered damage as a result of the earthquake, mostly the houses roofed with heavy log rafters that were untied to the adobe walls and fell in when the walls collapsed. Heavy and unexpected snowfall would also affect the colony's crop business. Colonia Díaz sat along the flood-prone banks of the Casas Grandes River. In 1908 heavy rains overflowed the river, which flooded Colonia Díaz and most of the surrounding fields. The flood washed away the precautionary sandbags and the town's levee, as well as houses and furniture. Many residents lost their business from the flood.

== Location ==
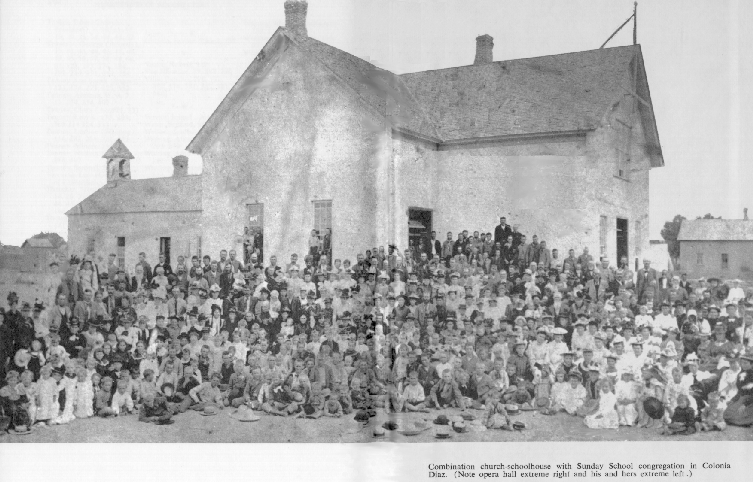
Combination church-schoolhouse with Sunday School congregation in Colonia Díaz.

Colonia Díaz was located in northern Chihuahua. The nearest Mexican city was Ascensión, four miles north of Díaz. El Paso, Texas is 200 miles north and the city of Chihuahua is 250 miles south of the location where Colonia Díaz existed. In 1886 Colonia Díaz consisted of 7000 acres. Subsequently 27,000 acres were purchased to add to the community.

The trip from Utah Valley to Colonia Díaz took three months. Most settlers actually traveled in a hurry for the fear of arrest from the Marshals that were enforcing the laws against polygamy. The first settlers of Colonia Diaz located at the banks of the Casas Grandes River. Instead of using their wagon boxes as homes, they initially made dugouts along the bank of the river, plastered them with mud and let it dry, then covered them with the wagon tarps. The fronts of these dugouts were later rocked up, providing adequate temporary homes until they could build better ones.

== Demographics ==
By March, 1894 there were 80 families of members of the Church of Jesus Christ of Latter-day Saints (LDS Church) and 660 inhabitants. All houses and the LDS meetinghouse were built of Mexican adobe without a rock foundation. Growth of population was steady but limited by several factors, primarily transmissible diseases including malaria, typhoid fever, diphtheria and smallpox.

== Economy ==
Settlement in Colonia Díaz was founded largely on farming and stock raising. Significant trade in flour happened due to a gristmill built in 1891. In 1894 a prosperous candy business was reported to have made several thousand pounds of candy from Mexican sugar. Several mills and a broom factory were also in operation in Colonia Díaz. In 1891 many of the men in Colonia Díaz worked and donated resources for the building of the Mexican Northern Pacific railway, although without much compensation. The summer rain of that year was unusually low, so the crops of Northern Mexico were scarce. Most of that year up to the summer of 1893 was characterized by a general destitution of food and clothing. After the summer of 1893 conditions were favorable leading to a prominent fair in October 1896 with local and national officials attending. Subsequent fairs became a notorious feature in the economic prosperity of the colony.

Colonia Díaz did not rely entirely on their own wells for irrigation. Most of the water supply for the farming lands came from a large spring on the neighboring mountains, conducted down the flats by way of a wide ditch several miles long. The inhabitants of Colonia Díaz raised everything they ate except for flour, sugar, and salt which were purchased at the stores. Besides farming and ranching, some residents earned a living as shoemakers, blacksmiths, tanners, carpenters, masons, and a few were store owners, miners and many worked on cattle ranches for their Mexicans neighbors.

== Culture ==
All residents of Colonia Díaz were active members of The Church of Jesus Christ of Latter-day Saints and religion was at the very center of the colony's culture. Church services were held in a large one-room schoolhouse that could be divided into four separate rooms with hanging curtains. Most residents participated in dances every Friday. The community also celebrated American holidays and some Mexican holidays, especially Cinco de Mayo. Theater was a constant cultural entertainment, including melodramas, dramas, and comedies.

== Education ==
Schooling was an important priority in Colonia Díaz. The school subjects included geography, reading, writing, arithmetic, and American and Mexican history. Spelling matches were common. Families homeschooled the subjects to their children if they lived too far out of town to get to school easily. After about the eighth grade the children who had saved enough money and had the desire to get more education were sent to Juarez Academy.
