= Family Fellowship =

Latter-day Saint support group for those who have LGBT family members

- Founded: 1993; 33 years ago
- Members: 1,700+
- Volunteers: 8
- Website: web.archive.org/web/20221003224359/https://ldsfamilyfellowship.net/

Family Fellowship is a predominantly Latter-day Saint support group for those who have lesbian, gay, bisexual, or transgender family members. It was founded in 1993, and it functioned for over 20 years. As of 2003, it had a mailing list of over 1,700. The group hosted conferences, open to the public, on various subjects concerning homosexuality. The web.archive.org link in the nearby box and in the references provides more detail on Family Fellowship.

== Leaders and Members ==
Organizational informality has characterized Family Fellowship. Over its history, three sets of co-chairs have led its efforts. The first were Fred and Wanda Karford of Idaho Falls (1993–1994), followed by Gary and Millie Watts of Provo (1995–2007), and finally Bill and Marge Bradshaw of Orem (2008–2012).

== Initiatives and Activities ==
In the months following its organization Family Fellowship sponsored the first of six conferences (in 1993, 1995, 1997, 1998, 1999, and 2001) focused on various aspects of homosexuality, its etiology, its history, its relation to morality and law, and not least, its particular impact on the lives of individuals. The featured speakers at these conferences were nationally prominent scientific experts and advocates. They included June Reinisch, head of the Kinsey Institute, Andrew Sullivan, editor of the New Republic, Dean Hamer from the National Institute of Health, Evan Wolfson, of Lamba Legal Defense, Simon LeVay, a leading neuroscientist investigator of brain development, Kate Kendall, Director of the National Center on Lesbian rights, Amity Buxton, author of a book on mixed orientation marriage, Robert Rees, former Editor of Dialogue, Lisa Diamond, Professor at the University of Utah and Christine Johnson. The first of these conferences, held at the University of Utah, drew more than four hundred participants.

Beginning in August 1993, the first issue of “Reunion,” the Family Fellowship newsletter, was sent out to a mailing list of over four hundred. Thirty four more issues followed. These newsletters regularly featured personal stories of LDS families trying to understand homosexuality as they confronted the disconnect between Church teachings and the reality of their lives. A complete set of the newsletters is also located in the Lee Library at Brigham Young University (BYU).

From 1994 to 2015 Family Fellowship conducted quarterly forums held alternately in Salt Lake City and Provo. They featured a variety of speakers and panel discussions. Attendance at these meetings ranged between fifty and one hundred members and visitors. They included gay men and lesbians, parents, straight allies, and other interested members of the public. People of all faiths participated.

== Impact ==
For nearly a quarter century Family Fellowship was at the forefront of efforts to advance LDS LGBT interests and to support those marginalized by Church doctrines and policies. By 2016 this group began to be less visible. Its leaders and core members were growing older and were content to see newer organizations push these causes forward. One concrete measure of the impact of Family Fellowship is seen in a recent survey of “known empirical literature” based on this (LDS LGBTQ) population. McGraw, et al. (2021) identified thirty three refereed publications using quantitative and qualitative methods. The authorship of fourteen of these is shared by individuals who have been leaders within Family Fellowship.

== See also ==
- Homosexuality and The Church of Jesus Christ of Latter-day Saints
