= Mormons =

Religious group of the Latter Day Saint movement

Latter-day Saints or Mormons
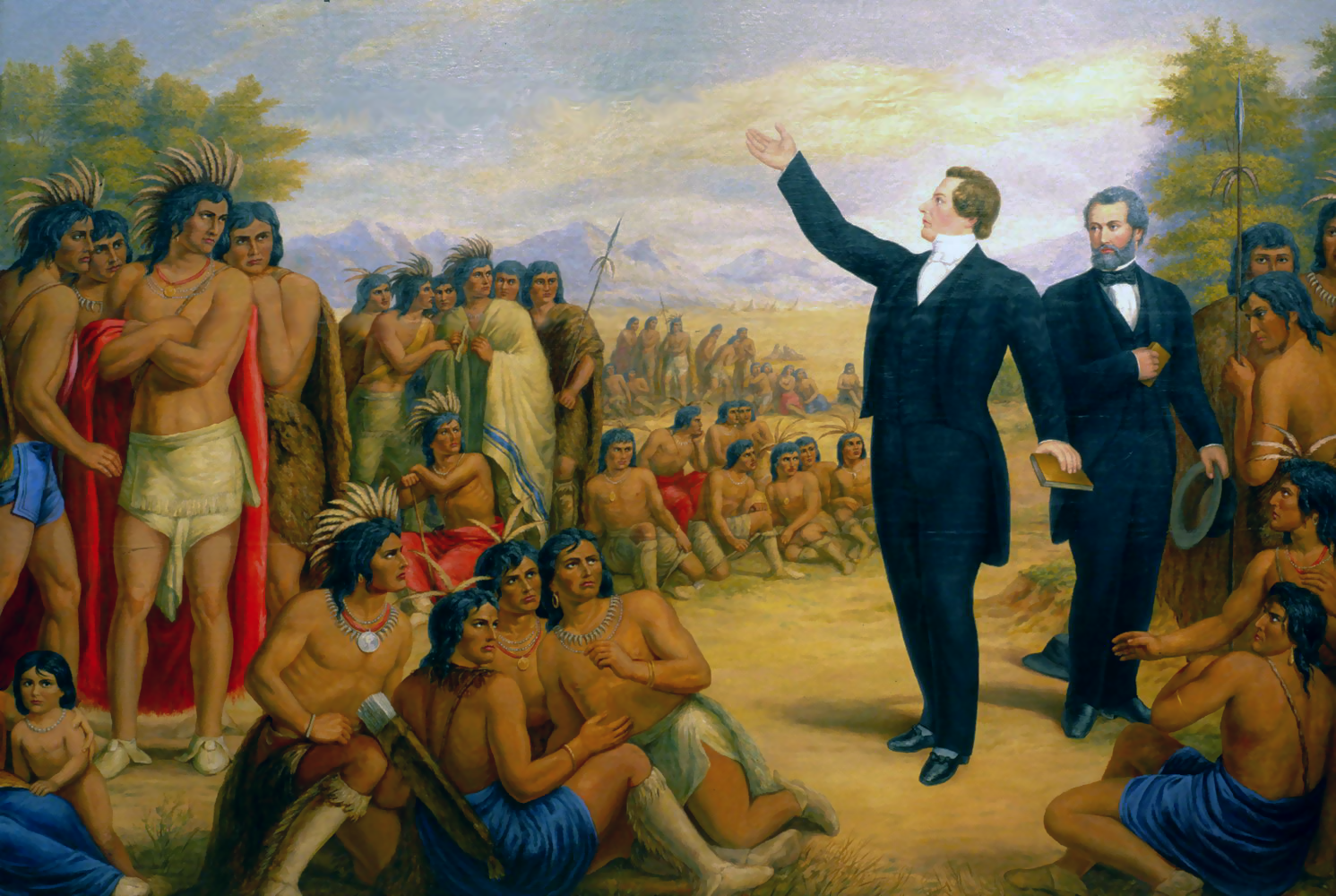
- Joseph Smith preaching to the Sac and Fox Indians who visited Nauvoo, Illinois on August 12, 1841

Total population
- 17,255,394

Regions with significant populations
- United States: 6,868,793
- Mexico: 1,516,406
- Brazil: 1,494,571
- Philippines: 867,271
- Peru: 637,180
- Chile: 607,583
- Argentina: 481,518
- Guatemala: 290,068

Religions
- Mormonism

Mormons are a religious and cultural group related to Mormonism, the theology and religious tradition of the Latter Day Saint movement started by Joseph Smith in upstate New York during the Second Great Awakening. After Smith's death in 1844, the movement split into several groups following different leaders; the majority followed Brigham Young, while smaller groups followed Sidney Rigdon and James Strang. Many who did not follow Young eventually merged into the Community of Christ, led by Smith’s son, Joseph Smith III. The term Mormon typically refers to members of the Church of Jesus Christ of Latter-day Saints (LDS Church), the largest branch, which followed Brigham Young. People who identify as Mormons may also be independently religious, secular, and non-practicing or belong to other denominations.

Since 2018, the LDS Church has expressed the desire that its followers be referred to as members of The Church of Jesus Christ of Latter-day Saints, or just members, if the identity of the church is made clear previously in the context, as the term Mormon has derogatory origins. (Note: The term "Latter-day" refers to the last dispensation, and "Saints" is the same denomination used at the time of Jesus in the New Testament.)

Members have developed a strong sense of community that stems from their doctrine and history. One of the central doctrinal issues that defined Mormonism in the 19th century was the practice of plural marriage, a form of religious polygamy. From 1852 until 1904, when the LDS Church banned the practice, many members who had followed Brigham Young to the Utah Territory openly practiced polygamy. Members are expected to dedicate significant time and resources to serving in their churches. A notable practice among both young and retired members of the LDS Church is to serve a full-time proselytizing mission. Members have a health code that eschews alcoholic beverages, tobacco, tea, coffee, and addictive substances. They tend to be very family-oriented and have strong connections across generations and with extended family, reflecting their belief that families can be sealed together beyond death. Members are expected to adhere to a law of chastity, requiring abstention from sexual relations outside heterosexual marriage and fidelity within marriage.

Mormons identify as Christian, but some non-Mormons consider church members to be non-Christian because some of their beliefs differ from those of Nicene Christianity. They believe that Christ's church was restored through Joseph Smith and is guided by living prophets and apostles. Members believe in the Bible and other books of scripture, such as the Book of Mormon. They have a unique view of cosmology and believe that all people are literal spirit children of God: they believe that returning to God requires following the example of Jesus Christ and accepting his atonement through repentance and ordinances such as baptism.

During the 19th century, converts into LDS Church tended to gather in a central geographic location, a trend that reversed somewhat in the 1920s and 1930s. The center of LDS Church cultural influence is in Utah, and North America has more members than any other continent, although about 60% of LDS Church members live outside the United States. As of December 31, 2021, the LDS Church reported a membership of 16,805,400.

== Terminology ==
The terminology preferred by the church itself has varied over time. At various points, the church has embraced the term Mormon and stated that other sects within the shared faith tradition should not be called Mormon.

The word Mormon was initially coined to describe any person who considers the Book of Mormon to be a scripture volume. Mormonite and Mormon were originally descriptive terms used both by outsiders to the faith, church members, and occasionally church leaders. The term Mormon later was sometimes used derogatorily; such use may have developed during the 1838 Mormon War, although church members and leaders "embraced the term", according to church historian Matthew Bowman, and by the end of the 1800s it was broadly used.

The LDS Church has made efforts, including in 1982, in 2001 prior to the 2002 Salt Lake City Olympics, in 2011 after The Book of Mormon appeared on Broadway, and again in 2018, to encourage the use of the church's full name, rather than the terms Mormon or LDS. According to Patrick Mason, chair of Mormon studies at Claremont Graduate University and Richard Bennett, a professor of church history at Brigham Young University, this is because non-church members have historically been confused about whether it represents a Christian faith, which concerns church leaders, who want to emphasize that the church is a Christian church. The term Mormon also causes concern for church leaders because it has been used to include splinter groups such as Fundamentalist Latter Day Saints, who practice polygamy, which the LDS Church does not; Mason said "For more than 100 years, the mainstream LDS Church has gone to great pains to distance itself from those who practice polygamy. It doesn't want to have any confusion there between those two groups."

In 2018, the LDS Church published a style guide that encourages the use of the terms "the Church", the "Church of Jesus Christ" or the "restored Church of Jesus Christ" as shortened versions after an initial use of the full name. According to church historian Bowman, 'the term "restored" refers to the idea that the original Christian religion is obsolete, and Mormons alone are practicing true Christianity.'

The 2018 style guide rejects the term Mormons along with "Mormon Church", "Mormonism", and the abbreviation LDS. The second-largest sect, the Community of Christ, also rejects the term Mormon due to its association with the practice of polygamy among Brighamite sects. Other sects, including several fundamentalist branches of the Brighamite tradition, embrace the term Mormon.

== History ==
The history of the Mormons has shaped them into a people with a strong sense of unity and commonality. From the start, Mormons have tried to establish what they call "Zion", a utopian society of the righteous. Mormon history can be divided into three broad periods: (1) the early history during the lifetime of Joseph Smith, (2) a "pioneer era" under the leadership of Brigham Young and his successors, and (3) a modern era beginning around the turn of the 20th century. In the first period, Smith attempted to build a city called Zion, where converts could gather. Zion became a "landscape of villages" in Utah during the pioneer era. In modern times, Zion is still an ideal, though Mormons gather together in their individual congregations rather than in a central geographic location.

=== Beginnings ===
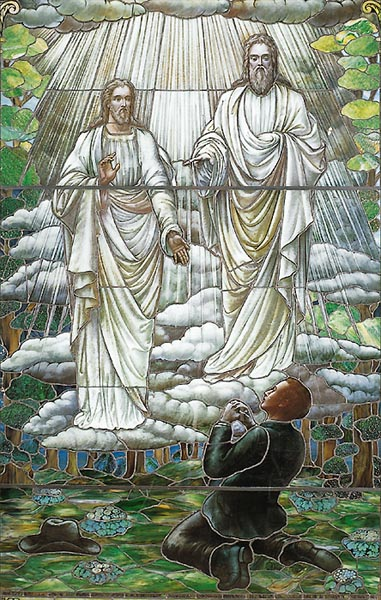
A stained glass window of Joseph Smith's 1820 First Vision

The Mormon movement began with the publishing of the Book of Mormon in March 1830, which Smith stated was a translation of golden plates containing the religious history of an ancient American civilization that the ancient prophet-historian Mormon had compiled. Smith stated that an angel had directed him to the golden plates buried in the Hill Cumorah. On April 6, 1830, Smith founded the Church of Christ. In 1832, Smith added an account of a vision he had sometime in the early 1820s while living in Upstate New York. Some Mormons regarded this vision as the most important event in human history after the birth, ministry, and resurrection of Jesus Christ.

The early church grew westward as Smith sent missionaries to proselytize. In 1831, the church moved to Kirtland, Ohio, where missionaries had made a large number of converts, and Smith began establishing an outpost in Jackson County, Missouri, where he planned to eventually build the city of Zion (or the New Jerusalem). In 1833, Missouri settlers, alarmed by the rapid influx of Mormons, expelled them from Jackson County into the nearby Clay County, where local residents were more welcoming. After Smith led a mission, known as Zion's Camp, to recover the land, he began building Kirtland Temple in Lake County, Ohio, where the church flourished. When the Missouri Mormons were later asked to leave Clay County in 1836, they secured land in what would become Caldwell County.

The Kirtland era ended in 1838 after the failure of a church-sponsored anti-bank caused widespread defections, and Smith regrouped with the remaining church in Far West, Missouri. During the fall of 1838, tensions escalated into the Mormon War with the old Missouri settlers. On October 27, the governor of Missouri ordered that the Mormons "must be treated as enemies" and be exterminated or driven from the state. Between November and April, some eight thousand displaced Mormons migrated east into Illinois.

In 1839, the Mormons purchased the small town of Commerce, converted swampland on the banks of the Mississippi River, renamed the area Nauvoo, Illinois, and began constructing the Nauvoo Temple. The city became the church's new headquarters and gathering place, and it grew rapidly, fueled in part by converts immigrating from Europe. Meanwhile, Smith introduced temple ceremonies meant to seal families together for eternity, as well as the doctrines of eternal progression or exaltation and plural marriage. Smith created a service organization for women called the Relief Society and the Council of Fifty, representing a future theodemocratic "Kingdom of God" on the earth. Smith also published the story of his First Vision, in which the Father and the Son appeared to him when he was about 14 years old. This vision would come to be regarded by some Mormons as the most important event in human history after the birth, ministry, and resurrection of Jesus Christ.

In 1844, local prejudices and political tensions, fueled by Mormon peculiarity, internal dissent, and reports of polygamy, escalated into conflicts between Mormons and "anti-Mormons" in Illinois and Missouri. Smith was arrested, and on June 27, 1844, he and his brother Hyrum were killed by a mob in Carthage, Illinois. Because Hyrum was Smith's logical successor, their deaths caused a succession crisis, and Brigham Young assumed leadership over most Latter Day Saints. Young had been a close associate of Smith's and was the senior apostle of the Quorum of the Twelve. Smaller groups of Latter-Day Saints followed other leaders to form other denominations of the Latter Day Saint movement.

=== Pioneer era ===
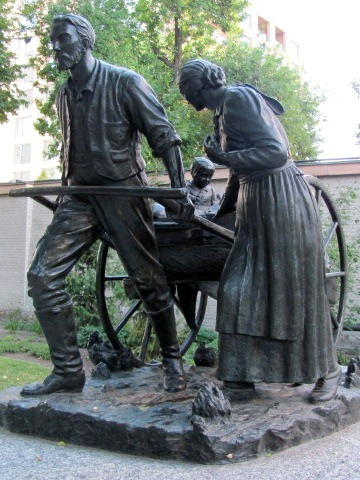
A statue commemorating the Mormon handcart pioneers

For two years after Joseph Smith's death, conflicts escalated between Mormons and other Illinois residents. To prevent war, Brigham Young led the Mormon pioneers (constituting most of the Latter Day Saints) to a temporary winter quarters in Nebraska and then, eventually (beginning in 1847), to what became the Utah Territory. Having failed to build Zion within the confines of American society, the Mormons began to construct a society in isolation based on their beliefs and values. The cooperative ethic that Mormons had developed over the last decade and a half became important as settlers branched out and colonized a large desert region now known as the Mormon Corridor. Colonizing efforts were seen as religious duties, and the new villages were governed by the Mormon bishops (local lay religious leaders). The Mormons viewed land as a commonwealth, devising and maintaining a cooperative system of irrigation that allowed them to build a farming community in the desert.

From 1849 to 1852, the Mormons greatly expanded their missionary efforts, establishing several missions in Europe, Latin America, and the South Pacific. Converts were expected to "gather" to Zion, and during Young's presidency (1847–77), over seventy thousand Mormon converts immigrated to America. Many of the converts came from England and Scandinavia and were quickly assimilated into the Mormon community. Many of these immigrants crossed the Great Plains in wagons drawn by oxen, while some later groups pulled their possessions in small handcarts. During the 1860s, newcomers began using the new railroad that was under construction.

In 1852, church leaders publicized the previously secret practice of plural marriage, a form of polygamy. Over the next 50 years, many Mormons (between 20 and 30 percent of Mormon families) entered into plural marriages as a religious duty, with the number of plural marriages reaching a peak around 1860 and then declining through the rest of the century. Besides the doctrinal reasons for plural marriage, the practice made some economic sense, as many of the plural wives were single women who arrived in Utah without brothers or fathers to offer them societal support.

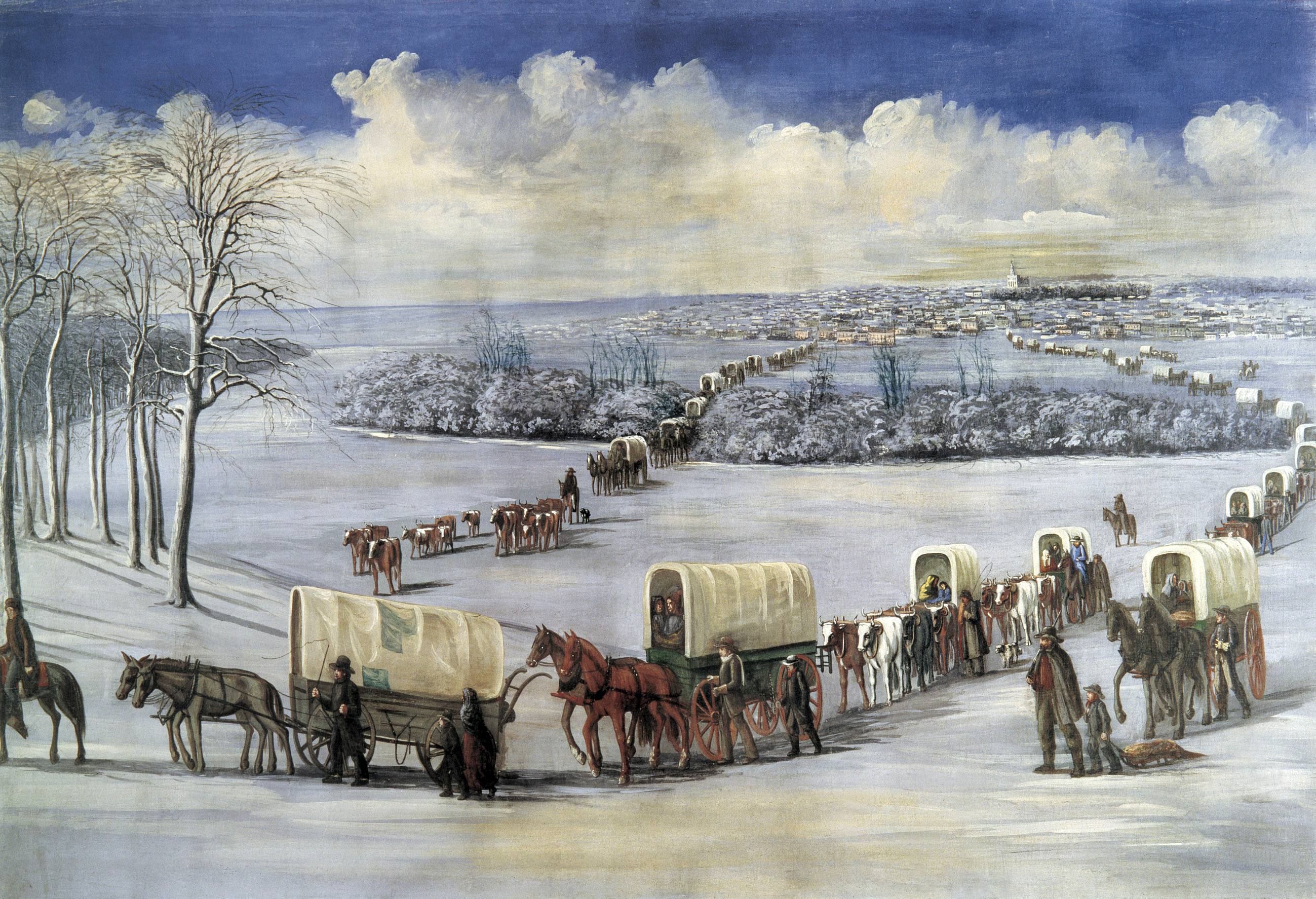
Mormon pioneers crossing the Mississippi on the ice

By 1857, tensions had again escalated between Mormons and other Americans, primarily due to accusations involving polygamy and the theocratic rule of the Utah Territory by Brigham Young. In 1857, U.S. President James Buchanan sent an army to Utah, which Mormons interpreted as open aggression against them. Fearing a repeat of Missouri and Illinois, the Mormons prepared to defend themselves, determined to torch their own homes if they were invaded. The Utah War ensued from 1857 to 1858, in which the most notable instance of violence was the Mountain Meadows massacre when leaders of a local Mormon militia ordered the killing of a civilian emigrant party that was traveling through Utah during the escalating tensions. In 1858, Young agreed to step down from his position as governor and was replaced by a non-Mormon, Alfred Cumming. Nevertheless, the LDS Church still wielded significant political power in the Utah Territory.

At Young's death in 1877, he was followed by other LDS Church presidents, who resisted efforts by the United States Congress to outlaw Mormon polygamous marriages. In 1878, the U.S. Supreme Court ruled in Reynolds v. United States that religious duty was not a suitable defense for practicing polygamy. Many Mormon polygamists went into hiding; later, Congress began seizing church assets. In September 1890, church president Wilford Woodruff issued a Manifesto that officially suspended the practice of polygamy. Although this Manifesto did not dissolve existing plural marriages, relations with the United States markedly improved after 1890, such that Utah was admitted as a U.S. state in 1896. After the Manifesto, some Mormons continued to enter into polygamous marriages, but these eventually stopped in 1904 when church president Joseph F. Smith disavowed polygamy before Congress and issued a "Second Manifesto" calling for all plural marriages in the church to cease. Eventually, the church adopted a policy of excommunicating members found practicing polygamy, and today actively seeks to distance itself from "fundamentalist" groups that continue the practice.

=== Modern times ===
During the early 20th century, Mormons began reintegrating into the American mainstream. In 1929, the Mormon Tabernacle Choir began broadcasting a weekly performance on national radio, becoming an asset for public relations. Mormons emphasized patriotism and industry, rising in socioeconomic status from the bottom among American religious denominations to the middle class. In the 1920s and 1930s, Mormons began migrating out of Utah, a trend hurried by the Great Depression, as Mormons looked for work wherever they could find it. As Mormons spread out, church leaders created programs to help preserve the tight-knit community feel of Mormon culture. In addition to weekly worship services, Mormons began participating in numerous programs such as Boy Scouting, a Young Women organization, church-sponsored dances, ward basketball, camping trips, plays, and religious education programs for youth and college students. During the Great Depression, the church started a welfare program to meet the needs of poor members, which has since grown to include a humanitarian branch that provides relief to disaster victims.

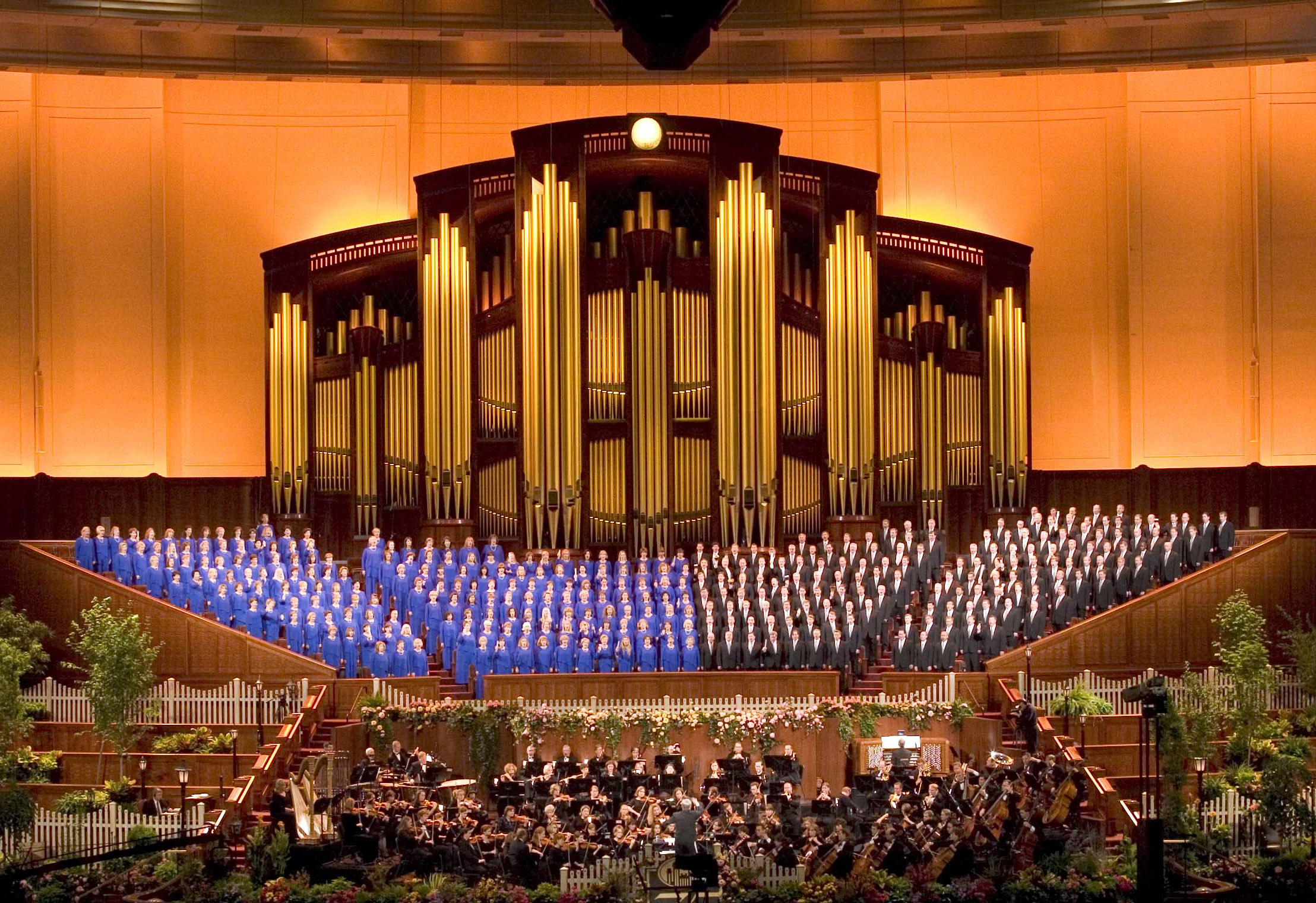
The 360-member Tabernacle Choir at Temple Square

During the later half of the 20th century, there was a retrenchment movement in Mormonism in which Mormons became more conservative, attempting to regain their status as a "peculiar people". Though the 1960s and 1970s brought changes such as Women's Liberation and the civil rights movement, Mormon leaders were alarmed by the erosion of traditional values, the sexual revolution, the widespread use of recreational drugs, moral relativism, and other forces they saw as damaging to the family. Partly to counter this, Mormons put an even greater emphasis on family life, religious education, and missionary work, becoming more conservative in the process. As a result, Mormons today are probably less integrated with mainstream society than they were in the early 1960s.

Although black people have been members of Mormon congregations since Joseph Smith's time, before 1978, black membership was small. From 1852 to 1978, the LDS Church enforced a policy restricting men of black African descent from being ordained to the church's lay priesthood. The church was sharply criticized for its policy during the civil rights movement, but the policy remained in force until a 1978 reversal that was prompted in part by questions about mixed-race converts in Brazil. In general, Mormons greeted the change with joy and relief. Since 1978, black membership has grown, and in 1997 there were approximately 500,000 black church members (about 5 percent of the total membership), mostly in Africa, Brazil, and the Caribbean. Black membership has continued to grow substantially, especially in West Africa, where two temples have been built. Some black Mormons are members of the Genesis Group, an organization of black members that predates the priesthood ban and is endorsed by the church.

Global distribution of LDS Church members in 2009

The LDS Church grew rapidly after World War II and became a worldwide organization as missionaries were sent across the globe. The church doubled in size every 15 to 20 years, and by 1996, there were more Mormons outside the United States than inside. In 2012, there were an estimated 14.8 million Mormons, with roughly 57 percent living outside the United States. It is estimated that approximately 4.5 million Mormons – approximately 30% of the total membership – regularly attend services. A majority of U.S. Mormons are white and non-Hispanic (84 percent). Most Mormons are distributed in North and South America, the South Pacific, and Western Europe. The global distribution of Mormons resembles a contact diffusion model, radiating out from the organization's headquarters in Utah. The church enforces general doctrinal uniformity, congregations on all continents teach the same doctrines, and international Mormons tend to absorb a good deal of Mormon culture, possibly because of the church's top-down hierarchy and missionary presence. However, international Mormons often bring pieces of their own heritage into the church, adapting church practices to local cultures.

As of December 2019, the LDS Church reported having 16,565,036 members worldwide. Chile, Uruguay, and several areas in the South Pacific have a higher percentage of Mormons than the United States (which is at about 2 percent). South Pacific countries and dependencies that are more than 10 percent Mormon include American Samoa, the Cook Islands, Kiribati, Niue, Samoa, and Tonga.

== Culture and practices ==
Isolation in Utah had allowed Mormons to create a culture of their own. As the faith spread worldwide, many of its more distinctive practices followed. Mormon converts are urged to undergo lifestyle changes, repent of sins, and adopt sometimes atypical standards of conduct. Practices common to Mormons include studying scriptures, praying daily, fasting regularly, attending Sunday worship services, participating in church programs and activities on weekdays, and refraining from work on Sundays when possible. The most important part of the church services is considered to be the Lord's Supper (commonly called sacrament), in which church members renew covenants made at baptism. Mormons also emphasize standards they believe were taught by Jesus Christ, including personal honesty, integrity, obedience to the law, chastity outside marriage, and fidelity within marriage.

In 2010, around 13–14 percent of Mormons lived in Utah, the center of cultural influence for Mormonism. Utah Mormons (as well as Mormons living in the Intermountain West) are on average more culturally and politically conservative than those living in some cosmopolitan centers elsewhere in the U.S. Utahns self-identifying as Mormon also attend church somewhat more on average than Mormons living in other states. (Nonetheless, whether they live in Utah or elsewhere in the U.S., Mormons tend to be more culturally and politically conservative than members of other U.S. religious groups.) Utah Mormons often emphasize pioneer heritage more than international Mormons, who generally are not descendants of the Mormon pioneers.

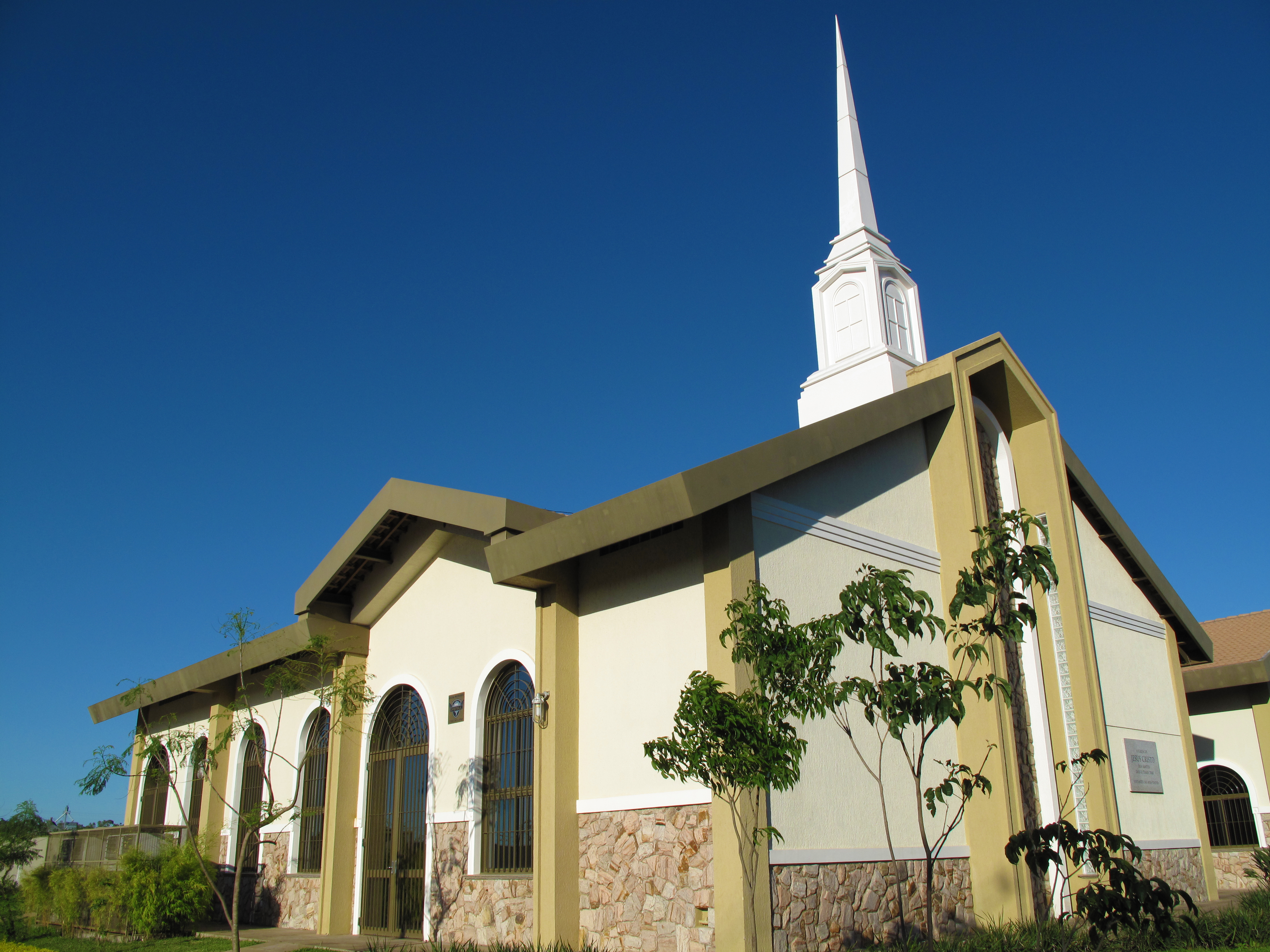
A Mormon meetinghouse used for Sunday worship services in Brazil

Mormons have a strong sense of communality that stems from their doctrine and history. LDS Church members have a responsibility to dedicate their time and talents to helping the poor and building the church. The church is divided by locality into congregations called "wards", with several wards or branches to create a "stake". Most church leadership positions are lay positions, and church leaders may work 10 to 15 hours a week in unpaid church service. Observant Mormons also contribute 10 percent of their income to the church as tithing. Paying tithing is one of the prerequisites for entrance into Mormon temples. Many LDS young men, women, and elderly couples choose to serve a proselytizing mission, during which they dedicate all of their time to the church without pay. Members are often involved in humanitarian efforts.

Mormons adhere to the Word of wisdom, a health law or code that is interpreted as prohibiting the consumption of tobacco, alcohol, coffee and tea, while encouraging the use of herbs, grains, fruits, and a moderate consumption of meat. The Word of Wisdom is also understood to forbid other harmful and addictive substances and practices, such as the use of illegal drugs and abuse of prescription drugs. Mormons are encouraged to keep a year's supplies, including food and financial reserves. Mormons also oppose behaviors such as viewing pornography and gambling.

The concept of a united family that lives and progresses forever is at the core of Latter-day Saint doctrine, and Mormons place a high importance on family life. Many Mormons hold weekly Family Home Evenings, in which an evening is set aside for family bonding, study, prayer, and other activities they consider to be wholesome. Latter-day Saint fathers who hold the priesthood typically name and bless their children shortly after birth to formally give the child a name. Mormon parents hope and pray that their children will gain testimonies of the "gospel" so they can grow up and marry in temples.

Mormons are encouraged to adhere to the law of chastity, requiring abstention from sexual relations outside opposite-sex marriage and strict fidelity within marriage. All sexual activity (heterosexual and homosexual) outside marriage is considered a grave sin, with marriage recognized as only between a man and a woman. Same-sex marriages are not performed or supported by the LDS Church. Church members are encouraged to marry and have children, and Latter-day Saint families tend to be larger than average. Mormons are opposed to abortion, except in some exceptional circumstances, such as when pregnancy is the result of incest or rape or when the life or health of the mother is in serious jeopardy. Many practicing adult Mormons wear religious undergarments that remind them of covenants and encourage them to dress modestly. Latter-day Saints are counseled not to partake in any form of media that is obscene or pornographic in any way, including media that depicts graphic representations of sex or violence. Tattoos and body piercings are generally discouraged.

LGBTQ Mormons remain in good standing in the church if they abstain from homosexual relations and obey the law of chastity. While there are no official numbers, LDS Family Services estimates that, on average, four or five members per LDS ward experience same-sex attraction. Gary Watts, former president of Family Fellowship, estimates that only 10 percent of homosexuals stay in the church. Many of these individuals have come forward through different support groups or websites discussing their homosexual attractions and concurrent church membership.

== Groups within Mormonism ==
Note that the categories below are not necessarily mutually exclusive.

=== Latter-day Saints ("LDS") ===
Members of the LDS Church, also known as Latter-day Saints, constitute over 95 percent of Mormons. The beliefs and practices of LDS Mormons are generally guided by the teachings of LDS Church leaders. However, several smaller groups substantially differ from "mainstream" Mormonism in various ways.

LDS Church members who do not actively participate in worship services or church callings are often called "less-active" or "inactive" (akin to the qualifying expressions non-observant or non-practicing used in relation to members of other religious groups). The LDS Church does not release statistics on church activity, but it is likely that about 40 percent of Mormons in the United States and 30 percent worldwide regularly attend worship services. Reasons for inactivity can include rejection of the fundamental beliefs, history of the church, lifestyle incongruities with doctrinal teachings or problems with social integration. Activity rates tend to vary with age, and disengagement occurs most frequently between age 16 and 25. In 1998, the church reported that most less active members returned to church activity later in life. As of 2017, the LDS Church was losing millennial-age members, a phenomenon not unique to the LDS Church. Former Latter-day Saints who seek to disassociate themselves from the religion are often referred to as ex-Mormons.

=== Fundamentalist Mormons ===
Members of sects that broke with the LDS Church over the issue of polygamy have become known as fundamentalist Mormons; these groups differ from mainstream Mormonism primarily in their belief in and practice of plural marriage. There are thought to be between 20,000 and 60,000 members of fundamentalist sects (0.1–0.4 percent of Mormons), with roughly half of them practicing polygamy. There are many fundamentalist sects, the largest three being the Fundamentalist Church of Jesus Christ of Latter-Day Saints (FLDS Church), the Apostolic United Brethren (AUB) and the Latter Day Church of Christ (also known as The Order or the Kingston Clan). In addition to plural marriage, some of these groups also practice a form of Christian communalism known as the law of consecration or the United Order. The LDS Church seeks to distance itself from all such polygamous groups, excommunicating their members if discovered practicing or teaching it, and today, a majority of Mormon fundamentalists have never been members of the LDS Church.

=== Liberal Mormons ===
Liberal Mormons, also known as Progressive Mormons, take an interpretive approach to LDS teachings and scripture. They look to the scriptures for spiritual guidance, but may not necessarily believe the teachings to be literally or uniquely true. For liberal Mormons, revelation is a process through which God gradually brings fallible human beings to greater understanding. A person in this group is sometimes mistakenly regarded by others within the mainstream church as a Jack Mormon, although this term is more commonly used to describe a different group with distinct motives to live the gospel in a non-traditional manner. Liberal Mormons place doing good and loving fellow human beings above the importance of believing correctly. In a separate context, members of small progressive breakaway groups have also adopted the label.

=== Cultural Mormons ===
Cultural Mormons are individuals who may not believe in certain doctrines or practices of the institutional LDS Church yet identify as members of the Mormon ethnic identity. Usually, this is a result of having been raised in the LDS faith or having converted and spent a large portion of one's life as an active member of the LDS Church. Cultural Mormons may or may not be actively involved with the LDS Church. In some cases, they may not be members of the LDS Church.

== Beliefs ==
Mormons have a scriptural canon consisting of the Bible (both Old and New Testaments), the Book of Mormon, and a collection of revelations and writings by Joseph Smith known as the Doctrine and Covenants and Pearl of Great Price. Mormons, however, have a relatively open definition of scripture. As a general rule, anything spoken or written by a prophet, while under inspiration, is considered to be the word of God. Thus, the Bible, written by prophets and apostles, is the word of God, so far as it is translated correctly. The Book of Mormon is also believed to have been written by ancient prophets and is viewed as a companion to the Bible. By this definition, the teachings of Smith's successors are also accepted as scripture, though they are always measured against and draw heavily from the scriptural canon.

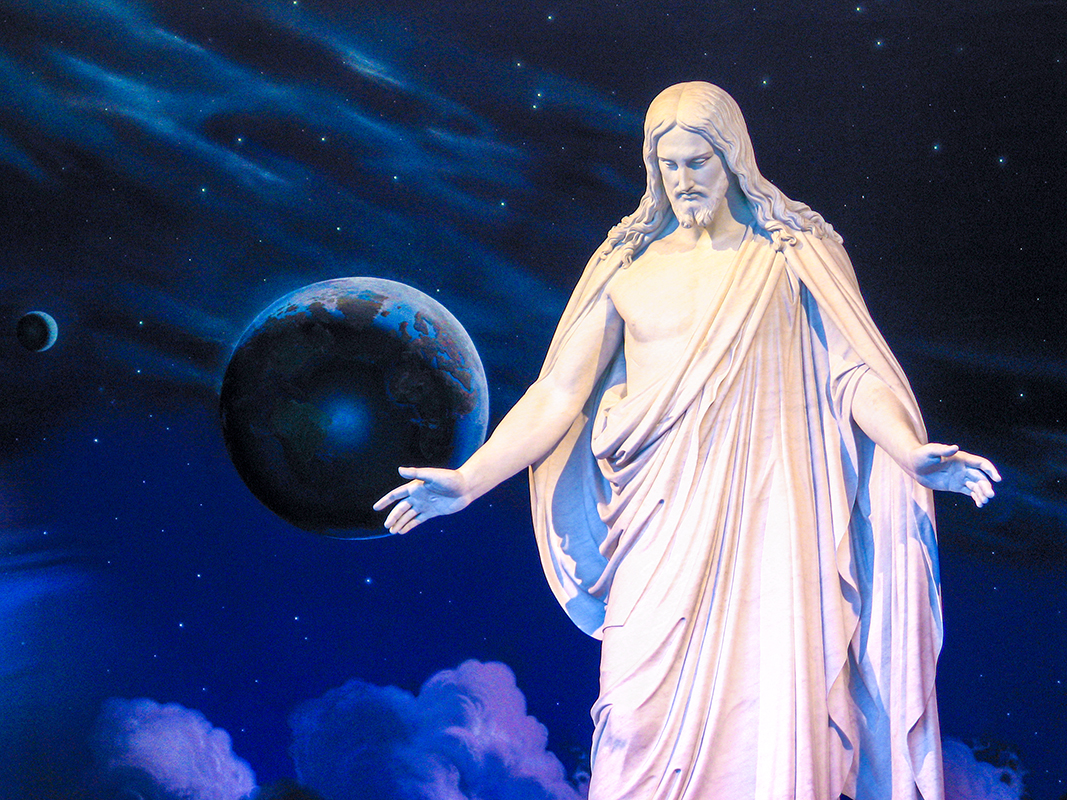
Mormons see Jesus Christ as the premier figure of their religion.

Mormons believe in "a friendly universe" governed by a God whose aim is to bring his children to immortality and eternal life. Mormons have a unique perspective on the nature of God, the origin of man, and the purpose of life. For instance, Mormons believe in a pre-mortal existence where people were literal spirit children of God and that God presented a plan of salvation that would allow his children to progress and become more like him. The plan involved the spirits receiving bodies on earth and going through trials in order to learn, progress, and receive a "fullness of joy". The most important part of the plan involved Jesus, the eldest of God's children, coming to earth as the literal Son of God to conquer sin and death so that God's other children could return. According to Mormons, every person who lives on earth will be resurrected, and nearly all of them will be received into various kingdoms of glory. To be accepted into the highest kingdom, a person must fully accept Christ through faith, repentance, and through ordinances such as baptism and the laying on of hands.

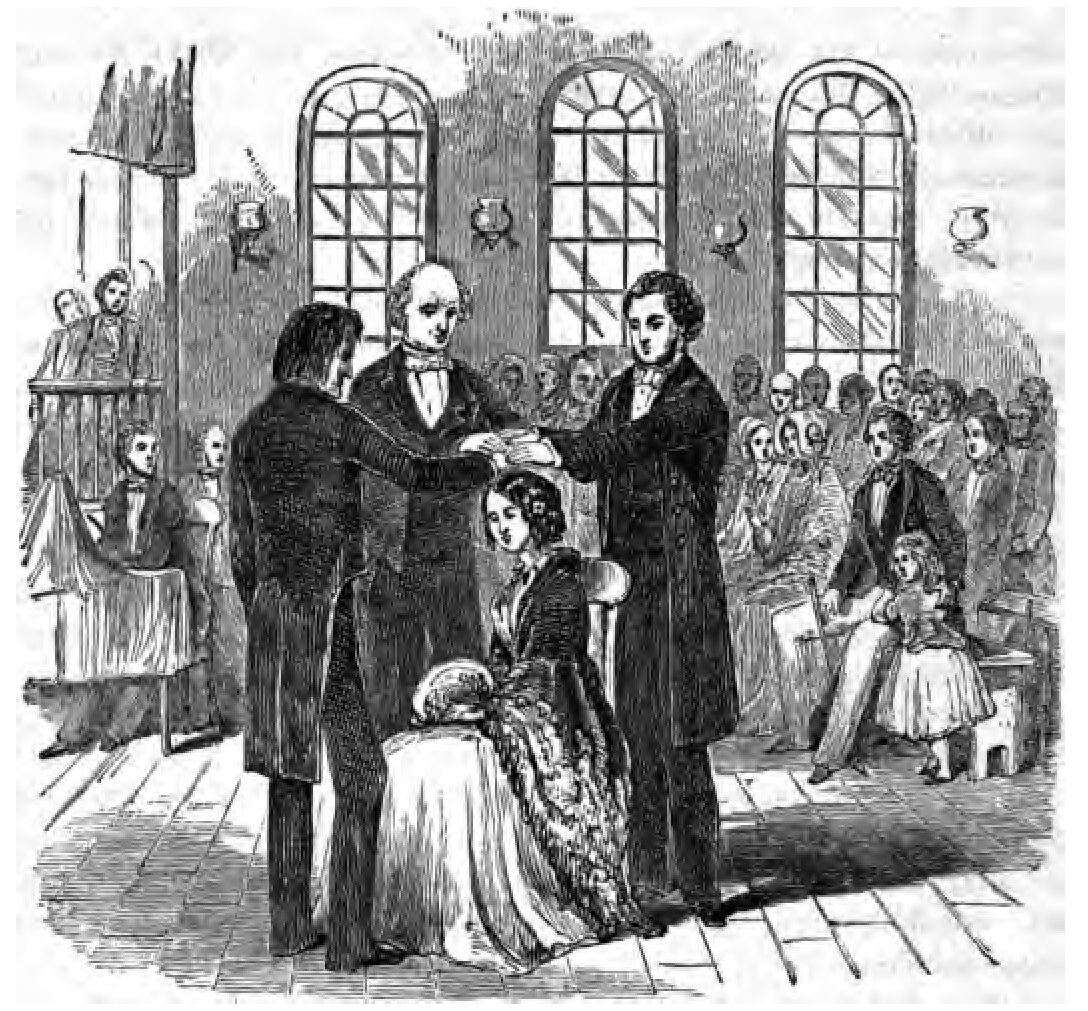
A Latter Day Saint confirmation c. 1852

According to Mormons, a deviation from the original principles of Christianity, referred to by them as The Great Apostasy, occurred after the ascension of Jesus Christ, marked by the corruption of Christian doctrine by Greek and other philosophies, Members state the martyrdom of the apostles led to a loss of priesthood authority to administer the church and its ordinances. Mormons believe that God restored the early Christian church through Joseph Smith. In particular, Mormons believe that angels such as Peter, James, John, John the Baptist, Moses, and Elijah appeared to Smith and others and bestowed various priesthood authorities on them. Mormons believe that their church is the "only true and living church" because of the divine authority restored through Smith. Mormons self-identify as being Christian, while many Christians, particularly evangelical Protestants, disagree with this view. Mormons view other religions as having portions of the truth, doing good works, and having genuine value.

The LDS Church has a top-down hierarchical structure with a president–prophet dictating revelations for the entire church. Lay members are also believed to have access to inspiration and are encouraged to seek their own personal revelations. Mormons see Joseph Smith's First Vision as proof that the heavens are open and that God answers prayers, and place considerable emphasis on asking God to find out if something is true. Most Mormons do not assert to have had heavenly visions like Smith's in response to prayers, but believe God talks to them in their hearts and minds through the Holy Ghost. According to Richard Lyman Bushman, members have some beliefs that are considered strange in a modernized world, but they continue to hold onto their beliefs because they feel God has spoken to them.

== See also ==
- List of Latter Day Saints
- Brighamite
- List of former or dissident LDS
- Anti-Mormonism

== Sources ==
- Allen, James B. (1966), "The Significance of Joseph Smith's First Vision in Mormon Thought", Dialogue: A Journal of Mormon Thought, 1 (3): 28–45, doi:10.2307/45223817, JSTOR 45223817, S2CID 222223353.
- Arrington, Leonard J. (1992), The Mormon Experience: A History of the Latter-Day Saints, University of Illinois Press, ISBN 978-0-252-06236-0.
- Brodie, Fawn M. (1971). No Man Knows My History: The Life of Joseph Smith (2nd ed.). New York: Knopf. ISBN 978-0-394-46967-6.
- Brooke, John L. (1994). The Refiner's Fire: The Making of Mormon Cosmology, 1644–1844. New York, NY: Cambridge University Press. ISBN 0-521-34545-6.
- Bushman, Richard Lyman (2005). Joseph Smith: Rough Stone Rolling. New York: Knopf. ISBN 978-1-4000-4270-8.
- Bushman, Richard Lyman (2008). Mormonism: A Very Short Introduction. New York: Oxford University Press. ISBN 978-0-19-531030-6.
- Marquardt, H. Michael (2005). The Rise of Mormonism, 1816–1844. Xulon Press.
- Howe, Eber Dudley, ed. (1834), Mormonism Unvailed, Painesville, Ohio: Telegraph Press.
- Mauss, Armand (1994). The Angel and the Beehive: The Mormon Struggle with Assimilation. Urbana & Chicago: University of Illinois Press. ISBN 978-0-252-02071-1.
- O'Dea, Thomas F. (1957). The Mormons. Chicago: University of Chicago Press. ISBN 978-0-226-61743-5.
- Quinn, D. Michael (1980), "The Council of Fifty and Its Members, 1844 to 1945", BYU Studies, 20 (2): 163–98, archived from the original on October 21, 2013.
- Quinn, D. Michael (1994). The Mormon Hierarchy: Origins of Power. Salt Lake City: Signature Books. ISBN 978-1-56085-056-4.
- Remini, Robert V. (2002). Joseph Smith. Penguin Lives. New York: Penguin Group. ISBN 0-670-03083-X.
- Roberts, B. H., ed. (1905), History of the Church of Jesus Christ of Latter-day Saints, vol. 3, Salt Lake City: Deseret News.
- Roberts, B. H., ed. (1909), History of the Church of Jesus Christ of Latter-day Saints, vol. 5, Salt Lake City: Deseret News.
- Shipps, Jan (1985). Mormonism: The Story of a New Religious Tradition. Chicago: University of Illinois Press. ISBN 978-0-252-01417-8.
- Smith, Joseph; Cowdery, Oliver; Rigdon, Sidney; Williams, Frederick G. (1835), Doctrine and Covenants of the Church of the Latter Day Saints: Carefully Selected from the Revelations of God, Kirtland, Ohio: F. G. Williams & Co, archived from the original on May 20, 2012.
- Widmer, Kurt (2000). Mormonism and the Nature of God: A Theological Evolution, 1830–1915. Jefferson, North Carolina: McFarland. ISBN 978-0-7864-0776-7.
