= Casas Grandes River =

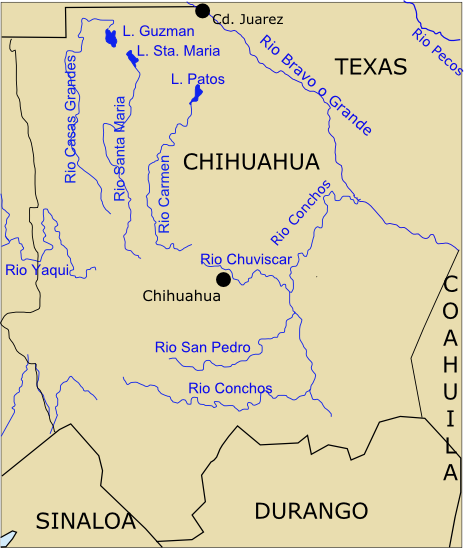
- Historic map of rivers of Chihuahua
- Native name: Río Casas Grandes (Spanish)

Location
- Country: Mexico
- State: Chihuahua

Physical characteristics
- Source
  - location: 30°15′13″N 107°59′25″W
- Mouth
  - location: 31°20′41″N 107°29′30″W

The Casas Grandes River is a river of Mexico.

== See also ==
- List of rivers of Mexico
