= LDS Mexican pilgrimage to Mesa Temple =

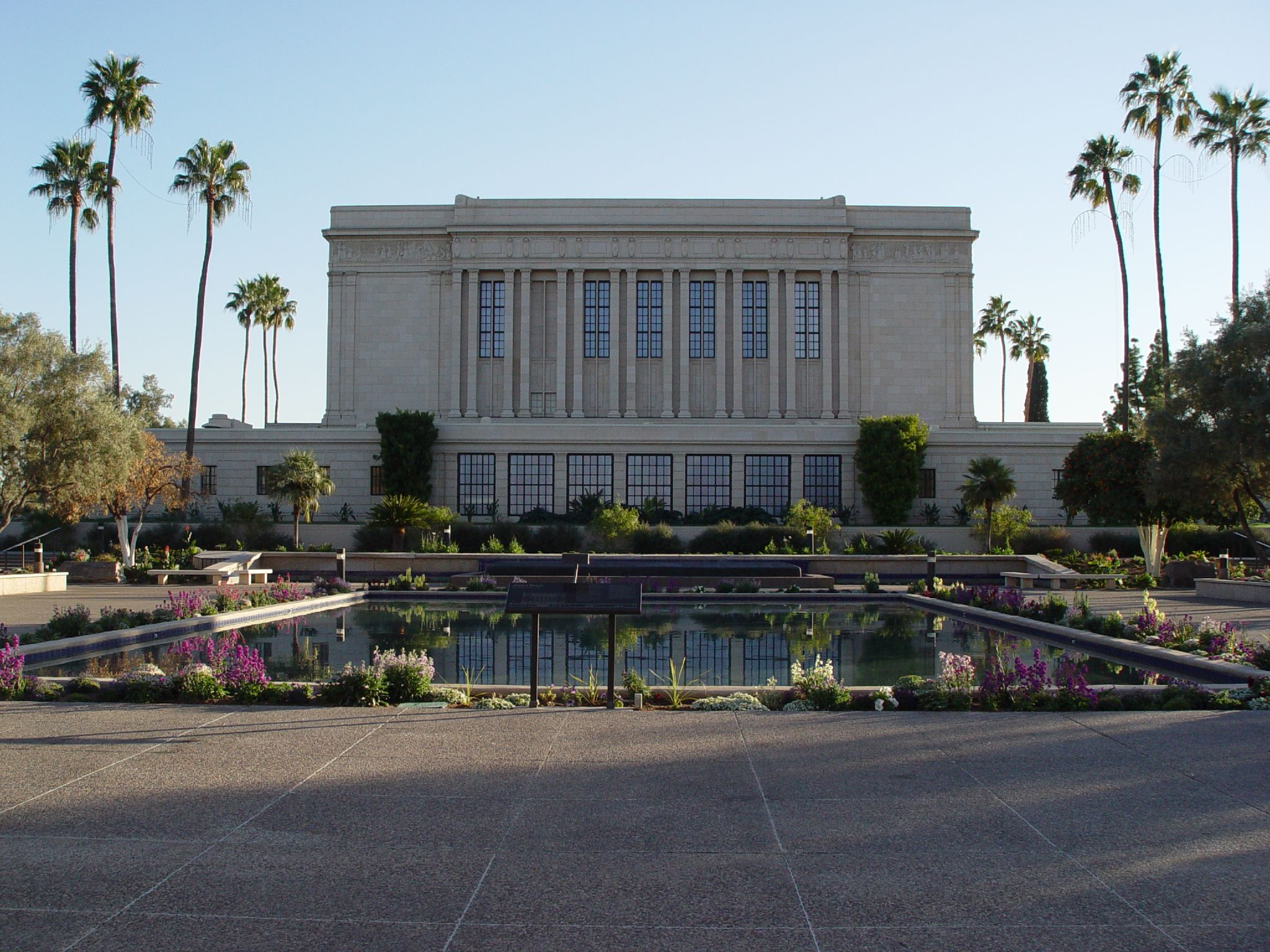
Mesa Arizona Temple

In November 1945, a large group of members of the Church of Jesus Christ of Latter-day Saints (LDS Church) traveled from Mexico to Arizona to participate in the Church's first-ever available temple ordinances in the Spanish language. This was the beginning of efforts to expand available temple worship into Spanish and other languages. Spanish-speaking members came from all over the Southern United States and Mexico to participate in a multi-day conference and Spanish temple sessions.

== History/Background ==
=== Conflict Between Mexican and American Church Leaders ===
The Church of Jesus Christ of Latter-day Saints was first established in Mexico in the 1870s. A long history of Anglo church leaders in Mexico confused some Mexican members. Desire for a Mexican mission president and a rise in nationalism after the revolution led Church members such as Margarito Bautista to form a break-off group and appoint their own Mexican church leaders. This break-off group later came to be known as the Third Convention.

In 1942, Arwell L. Pierce was assigned to be the mission president in Mexico. Pierce made efforts to understand the Mexican church members and began trying to resolve tensions with the Third Convention. His efforts to unify the dissenting group, coupled with internal contention within the leadership of the Third Convention, eventually led to their reunification with the main body of the church.

== Preparation for Spanish Temple Sessions ==
Temples are an important part of Latter-day Saint worship, but in the early to mid-1900s, Spanish-speaking Saints could only participate if there were translators present or if they understood enough English to make it through the ceremonies. After hearing missionaries emphasize the importance of temple worship, Spanish-speaking church members in La Rama Mexicana in Arizona expressed the desire for temple worship in Spanish to their leaders. In 1943, Lorin F. Jones, the mission president over the Spanish-American Mission (which covered much of the Spanish-speaking American Southwest), introduced to Church leaders the desire to make temple worship available in Spanish. Later that year, Joseph Fielding Smith and his wife met with President Jones and Charles Pugh, the president of the Mesa Temple, and discussed the idea of hosting a Spanish-language temple day. Smith was supportive and was recorded to have said, "I see no reason why the English language should monopolize the temple session." President Jones took the issue to other Church leaders in Salt Lake City, and eventually, they agreed, as well.

=== Translation ===
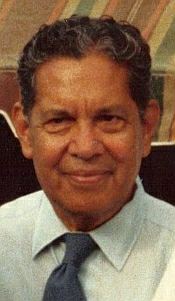
Eduardo Balderas

Once the decision was made to host Spanish-language sessions at the Mesa Temple, there was a need to translate the already existing English ordinances into Spanish. Eduardo Balderas had been working on various translation projects for the Church since around 1930. In 1939, the Church created an official bureau for Church translation and hired Balderas to head the translations. The translation of the temple endowment into Spanish was approved in 1944. Working with Antoine R. Ivins, Balderas started translating the temple ceremonies. Balderas and Ivins had to carefully consider how to maintain the doctrinal meaning of the ordinances while translating English words and phrases that were uniquely specific to the LDS religion. The translation was completed within a year and was ready to be used by November 1945.

== 1945 Pilgrimage to Mesa ==
In November 1945, many Mexican and other Spanish-speaking Saints travelled to participate in temple ordinances. For many people, traveling to Mesa required significant time and money. Relief Society sisters from both La Rama Mexicana and the Maricopa Stake helped to provide food and lodging for those who traveled to the Mesa Temple.

This gathering was inaugurated with a conference addressed to the Spanish-speaking members who had made the trip. This conference, directed by President Lorin Jones and President Arwell Pierce, included three sessions over two days, starting on Sunday, November 4, and ending on Monday evening. The messages were given in Spanish, either by the bilingual speakers themselves or through an interpreter. The first session took place during the Rama Mexicana's church service, and replaced the usual Sunday School class. President David O. McKay, the second counselor of the First Presidency of the Church at the time, attended the conference and addressed the group, commending them for their efforts and sacrifices to attend the temple. Juan Garcia, a branch president from Mexico, also spoke about the significance of this pilgrimage: "Perhaps some of us have made sacrifices, but those sacrifices that we have made are not in vain. We are joyous in having made them." The second session was on Sunday afternoon, in which there was a time for the congregation to publicly sustain the general leaders of the Church. Antoine R. Ivins was the main speaker, speaking about the importance of making covenants with God. The third and final session took place on Monday evening. Over 1,000 English-speaking Saints attended, even though the meeting was in Spanish.

In the first week of Spanish temple ceremonies in Mesa, 124 baptisms for the dead, 375 endowments, 38 living sealings, and 165 sealings of children to parents were performed.

== Legacy of the 1945 Pilgrimage ==
=== Continuing Temple Worship for Mexican Saints ===
The Mesa Arizona temple was the first temple of the Church of Jesus Christ of Latter-day Saints to have ordinances available in Spanish. The Mesa Temple served as a "pilgrimage spot" and a gathering place for Spanish-speaking Saints who came to worship in the temple, hold youth conferences, and have family reunions. Many Saints traveled to the Mesa temple yearly. Conferences called "Lamanite Conferences" were also held yearly. During visits and "Lamanite Conferences," members of the stake in Mesa continued to help provide food and lodging for those traveling from Mexico. It remained the only temple with Spanish ordinances available until the dedication of the Mexico City Temple in 1983.

=== Lasting Impact of 1945 Pilgrimage for the Church of Jesus Christ of Latter-day Saints ===
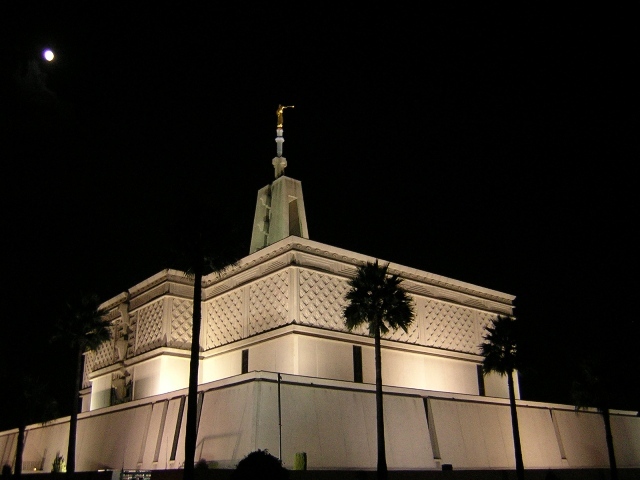
Mexico City Temple

The first temple in Mexico was dedicated in 1983 in Mexico City. Temples in Spanish-speaking and Latino countries have grown, with 27 in Mexico, and more temples in Central and South America. See also List of temples by geographic region (LDS Church).

The Church of Jesus Christ of Latter-day Saints has continued to expand the languages in which temple ordinances are available. In 2020, church leader Elder David A. Bednar said, "The endowment ceremony currently is presented in 88 languages and will become available in many additional languages as temples are built to bless more of God’s children. In the next 15 years, the number of languages in which temple ordinances will be available likely will double."
