= George Albert Smith =

President of The Church of Jesus Christ of Latter-day Saints

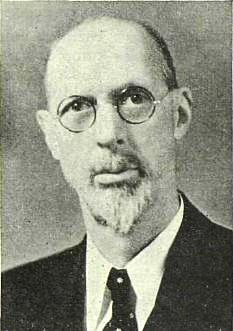

8th President of the Church of Jesus Christ of Latter-day Saints
- May 21, 1945 – April 4, 1951
- Predecessor: Heber J. Grant
- Successor: David O. McKay

President of the Quorum of the Twelve Apostles
- June 21, 1943 – May 21, 1945
- Predecessor: Rudger Clawson
- Successor: George F. Richards
- End reason: Became President of the Church

Quorum of the Twelve Apostles
- October 8, 1903 – May 21, 1945
- Called by: Joseph F. Smith
- End reason: Became President of the Church

LDS Church Apostle
- October 8, 1903 – April 4, 1951
- Called by: Joseph F. Smith
- Reason: Death of Brigham Young Jr.
- Reorganization at end of term: Marion G. Romney ordained

Personal details
- Born: April 4, 1870; Salt Lake City, Utah Territory, U.S.
- Died: April 4, 1951 (aged 81); Salt Lake City, Utah, U.S.
- Resting place: Salt Lake City Cemetery; 40.777°N 111.858°W
- Spouse(s): Lucy Emily Woodruff (m. 1892; died 1937)
- Children: 3
- Parents: John Henry Smith; Sarah Farr
- Signature

George Albert Smith Sr. (April 4, 1870 – April 4, 1951) was an American religious leader who served as the eighth president of the Church of Jesus Christ of Latter-day Saints (LDS Church).

== Early life ==
Born in Salt Lake City, Utah Territory, Smith was one of nineteen children of Latter Day Saint apostle John Henry Smith. His mother, Sarah Farr, was the first of John Henry Smith's two wives (whom he had simultaneously for many years). His grandfather, for whom he was named, was also an LDS Church apostle as well as a cousin of church prophet Joseph Smith. John Henry Smith and George Albert Smith are the only father and son pair to have been members of the Quorum of the Twelve at the same time, having served in the Quorum together between 1903 and 1910.

In his youth, Smith worked at the Zion's Co-operative Mercantile Institution (ZCMI) factory and traveled throughout Utah as a salesman. Smith attended high school at Brigham Young Academy, graduating in 1884. He then studied law at University of Deseret (later the University of Utah) for a year. His work as a salesman for ZCMI involved a long trip, starting at Panaca, Nevada and moving north-eastward, with Smith taking grocery orders while his associate, James Poulton, took shoe orders. Smith also gave many impromptu concerts on this sales trip, playing on harmonica and guitar with Poulton accompanying on the flute. During this journey Smith would regularly attend LDS Church services on Sundays in the towns he passed through coming north from Panaca. He would be regularly invited to give a talk while visiting.

== Employment and politics ==
In 1894, after returning from serving in the church's Southern States Mission, Smith got a job as assistant to a traveling salesman at ZCMI. He excelled at this enough to be promoted to working in the packing box shop, where he again excelled and was promoted to wholesale grocery salesman for ZCMI's Salt Lake County operations.

Smith also served as secretary of the Kanab Cattle Company and a member of the Utah National Guard.

In 1896, he had joined the Republican Party and campaigned for William McKinley, who became President of the United States. He was later present at the Pan American exposition in Buffalo in 1901 and heard the shot that killed McKinley.

He was appointed as a receiver for the Land Office in Utah in the years 1898 and 1903.

While surveying for a railroad as a young man, Smith's eyesight was permanently impaired by glare from the sun. After 1903, Smith found his frequent travels debilitating and began to show prominent symptoms of physical weakness. He was eventually diagnosed with lupus erythematosus, a chronic debilitating autoimmune disease.

From 1898 to 1902 Smith was chair of the Republican committee for the 28th voting district of Utah.

In 1902, there were those who sought to convince Smith to run for the United States Senate. He instead deferred to allow Reed Smoot to be the Republican candidate.

In 1920, while serving as president of the church's European Mission, Smith toured England and Scotland as the ZCMI representative to the American Goods Association tour sponsored by the British Chamber of Trade.

In 1921, Smith became a member of the Salt Lake City Chamber of Commerce. In 1923, he served on the reception committee for US President Warren G. Harding's visit to Salt Lake City.

Smith was known for his patriotism and joined various American patriotic groups. He was also an ardent supporter of the Boy Scouts of America (BSA). He was among those closely involved in the 1912 decision for the LDS Church to sponsor scout troops. He also was closely involved in its implementation. Especially in the 1920s, Smith would regularly contact Salt Lake City businessmen to personally urge them to donate money to scouting. In the 1920s Smith was elected a member of the BSA Regional Executive Council for the 12th region. This council oversaw scouting in California, Nevada, Arizona and Utah. In 1932, Smith was elected a member of the BSA's National Council. He was the first of many leaders of the LDS Church to hold this position. He also received the Silver Beaver Award that year. In 1934, the BSA's National Council awarded him the prestigious Silver Buffalo Award.

Smith was an avid genealogist and family historian and was named a vice president general of the National Society of the Sons of the American Revolution in 1922.

In 1932, Smith found himself at odds with much of the ZCMI board over plans to cut pensions for retirees as the Great Depression caused disruption for the company. Smith felt that the pensions should be left in place. Being unable to support the chosen course of action, he resigned from the board later that year.

Starting in 1933 Smith was president of the Utah Society for the Sightless. He continued in this position until 1949. Under his leadership the society built a new home for the blind in Salt Lake City. They also printed the first Braille edition of the Book of Mormon.

== Marriage and family ==
On May 25, 1892, Smith married Lucy Emily Woodruff, a granddaughter of Wilford Woodruff, in the Manti Temple. The couple later had three children. It was several years after their marriage that the first daughter was born, with the pregnancy starting shortly after Woodruff gave Lucy a priesthood blessing to be a mother. Lucy had spent much of her time growing up in the household of her grandfather and looked on him as almost more of a father than a grandfather. Smith's son, George Albert Smith, Jr., became a professor at Harvard Business School.

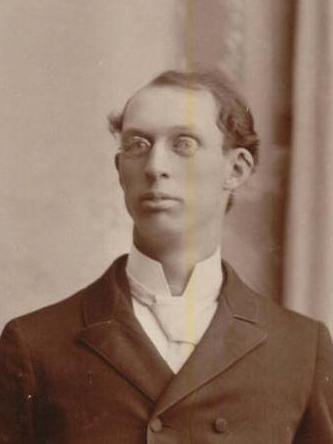
George Albert Smith,
ca. 1890

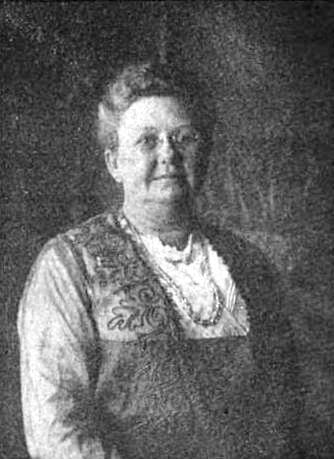
Lucy Emily Woodruff, wife of George Albert Smith

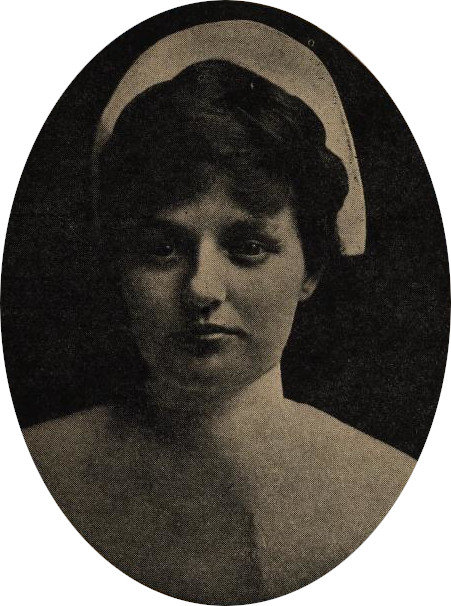
Emily Smith Stewart
as a nurse

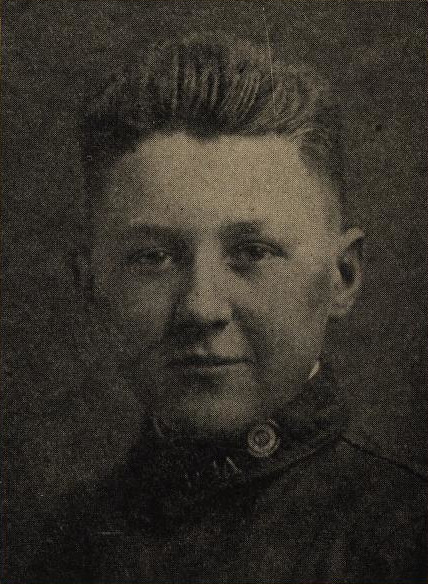
George Albert Smith Jr. as a teenager

Smith's daughter Emily Stewart, served for a time on the Primary General Board. Louie B. Felt, the general superintendent of the Primary, guided Stewart to take a hospital training course in Denver expand her medical training she already had as a registered nurse. She then became one of the leaders of Primary Children's Hospital in Salt Lake City. She and May Anderson disagreed on how to run the hospital which led to her resignation from the Primary General Board in 1932.

Smith's second daughter, Edith, earned a master's degree in history. For much of the 1930s Smith was involved in protecting her husband, George Elliott, from charges of mail fraud connected with alleged fraudulent stock sales by the Salt Lake Mortuary in Montana. Smith's brother, Winslow Farr Smith, was also involved with these charges. Smith felt the charges were baseless charges developed by other morticians who resented the Salt Lake Mortuary's low prices.

Lucy served as president of the Relief Society in Europe while Smith was the mission president. She also was a delegate to the world council. She was a member of the YW MIA's General Board for 29 years.

Lucy Smith died in 1937. Smith never remarried, which made him the only man to have not had a living wife while he was serving as church president until Gordon B. Hinckley and Thomas S. Monson both served the later part of their presidencies while widowed.

== LDS Church service ==
Just prior to his marriage to Lucy, Smith served as a Mutual Improvement Association (MIA) missionary throughout many areas in Southern Utah. He was set apart as a missionary on September 7, 1891. He was assigned to serve with William B. Dougall, Jr., who was a grandson of Brigham Young. They were assigned to the 4 stakes that covered Juab, Millard, Beaver and Iron counties. The assignment was to increase attendance and participation in MIA, for both young men and young women.

Smith and his new wife, Lucy, were missionaries in the church's Southern States Mission, with J. Golden Kimball as their mission president, from 1892 to 1894. Smith was appointed mission secretary. Initially when Smith left to serve in the Southern States mission on June 23, 1892, he left Lucy behind in Salt Lake City.

Smith's first assignment in Tennessee was to serve in the Middle Tennessee District, covering the area in and around the city of Nashville. It was intended he would assume the position of mission secretary, essentially chief assistant to the mission president, in August. It was also planned for his wife to join him at that time. However, Kimball felt that Smith needed more training in the mission field before being joined by his wife, and so did not allow her to join her husband until November. From November 1892 to August 1893 and from October 1893 to May 1894 Kimball was out of the mission so Smith was acting mission president.

As was common at the time, Smith was ordained a seventy when he went on his mission. After returning, he was made a member of the third quorum of the seventies presiding council in Salt Lake City, which meant he had specific assignments for conducting missionary outreach in the area.

Smith also served as a Sunday School teacher and then as the organization's superintendent for the 17th Ward in Salt Lake City, immediately north-west of Temple Square.

For a few years leading up to 1902 Smith served as an assistant to Richard R. Lyman and Joseph F. Merrill in running the Salt Lake Stake's youth program for young men. At the time the Salt Lake Stake took in all of Salt Lake county and was by far the largest stake by membership in the LDS Church. It was looked upon as the "flagship" stake of the church, and Lyman, Merrill and Smith initiated programs and changes that were adopted elsewhere throughout the church. Smith then served as head of the youth program for young men in Salt Lake Stake from 1902 to 1903.

=== Apostleship ===
Smith was called as a member of the Quorum of the Twelve Apostles in 1903. In 1907, Smith negotiated the church's purchase of the Joseph Smith farm in Palmyra, New York.

From 1920 until 1921 Smith served as president of the church's British and European missions. In this capacity, he preached in the United Kingdom, Ireland, France, the Netherlands, Switzerland, and Germany. He worked tirelessly to convince the British government to allow the church to send more missionaries and also met with Swiss officials to get permission to send more missionaries to that country.

While presiding over the European Mission, Smith had his first airplane flight as part of a journey from Britain to Sweden. Throughout the 1920s and 1930s he was a strong supporter of use of airplanes in travel. J. Reuben Clark, of the church's First Presidency, was an equally ardent opposer of the use of airplanes. Considering how many airplanes crashed in these early years of aviation Clark may well have had a more reasonable approach to the issue.

From 1922 to 1935, Smith was the general superintendent of the church's MIA. His counselors were Richard R. Lyman and Melvin J. Ballard. During his tenure, cooperation between the young men and young women's MIA organizations increased. One sign of this was the Young Woman's Journal, merging into the young women's MIA-published Improvement Era in 1929. In 1935 he was succeeded in this position by Albert E. Bowen.

His illnesses seem to have come on in large part as a result of many of the difficult circumstances he suffered while visiting stake conferences during the first six years he was an apostle.

After his return from Europe in 1921, Smith had a full schedule of stake conference assignments. That year he presided at stake conferences in Utah, Arizona and in Chihuahua state in Mexico.

In 1921 Smith became the chairman of the executive board of the Deseret News. He was also on the general board for Religion Classes, which were weekday religious instruction that later merged with the Young Men and Young Women programs. He was also made chairman of the church's Centennial Celebration Committee. Smith continued as chair of the Centennial Committee until it work ended in 1930.

In 1928, Smith purchased the Hill Cumorah for the church. This was a result of over 20 years of work on trying to get the hill coordinated between Smith and Willard Bean on the part of the church and the local landowners.

In 1930, Smith invited a group of his friends who shared his interest in the history of the LDS Church to his house. They organized the Utah Pioneer Trails and Landmarks Association. Smith was made the first president of this organization. They placed a large number of historical markers in the western United States over the next five years. The group would eventually erect more than 100 monuments and markers.

With the death of quorum president, Rudger Clawson, in 1943, Smith was sustained as President of the Quorum of the Twelve Apostles and served in the position for two years.

=== Church president ===
With the death of Heber J. Grant, Smith became president of the church on May 21, 1945. When World War II ended, Smith helped send supplies to Europe and was also known for his efforts to revitalize missionary work. He publicly denounced the activities and political influence of the American Ku Klux Klan. Smith dedicated the Idaho Falls Temple on September 23, 1945. Over his lifetime, he traveled approximately a million miles fulfilling church assignments.

Smith was the first church president to visit Mexico while in office. He went there to complete the reconciliation of and return to the church a group of apostates in Mexico known as the "Third Conventionists". Also during his presidency the first translation of the endowment ceremony was done. The translation was done by Antoine R. Ivins and Eduardo Balderas, with the approval of the First Presidency.

In 1947, Smith sent a response letter to a California stake president who was asking about subject of interracial marriage. He stated, "Social intercourse between the Whites and the Negroes should certainly not be encouraged because of leading to intermarriage, which the Lord has forbidden. ... [T]rying to break down social barriers between the Whites and the Blacks is [a move] that should not be encouraged because inevitably it means the mixing of the races if carried to its logical conclusion."

== Emotional illness ==
While not common knowledge among contemporary members of the LDS Church, nor even in Smith's day, it was well known to his close friends, church associates, and family members that Smith suffered from chronic depression and anxiety, which at times could be debilitating, including one nervous breakdown that left him largely bedridden from 1909 to 1912. Throughout his life, Smith took to his bed, sometimes for days at a time, with emotional and mental illness related issues. Smith professed that these experiences helped deepen his understanding of the Gospel and personal belief in the existence of God, stating in a 1921 general conference session, "I have been in the valley of the shadow of death in recent years, so near the other side that I am sure that for the special blessing of our Heavenly Father I could not have remained here. ... The nearer I went to the other side, the greater was my assurance that the gospel is true."

According to Mary Jane Woodger:

"Those close to George Albert Smith were aware of some emotional problems. Grandchild George Albert Smith V suggests that his grandfather struggled with depression, feeling incompetent, and being overwhelmed. There were times when 'he just could not pull it all together.' Another granddaughter, Shauna Lucy Stewart Larsen, who lived in George Albert's home for twelve years as a child, remembers that 'when there was great, tremendous stress, mostly [of] an emotional kind, it took its toll and he would literally have to go to bed for several days.' Grandson Robert Murray Stewart remembers, 'There were problems associated with his mental health, just maintaining control of himself.' Given what seems to be George Albert's emotional fragility, physical illness may have been a socially acceptable way for him to retreat, rest, and regroup before tackling his responsibilities again with renewed determination."

== Death and legacy ==
In March 1951, Smith suffered a stroke that left him mostly paralyzed on the right side of his body, and gradually deteriorated until his death on April 4, 1951, his 81st birthday. He was buried at Salt Lake City Cemetery on April 7, 1951, and his funeral was held in place of that day’s General Conference sessions.

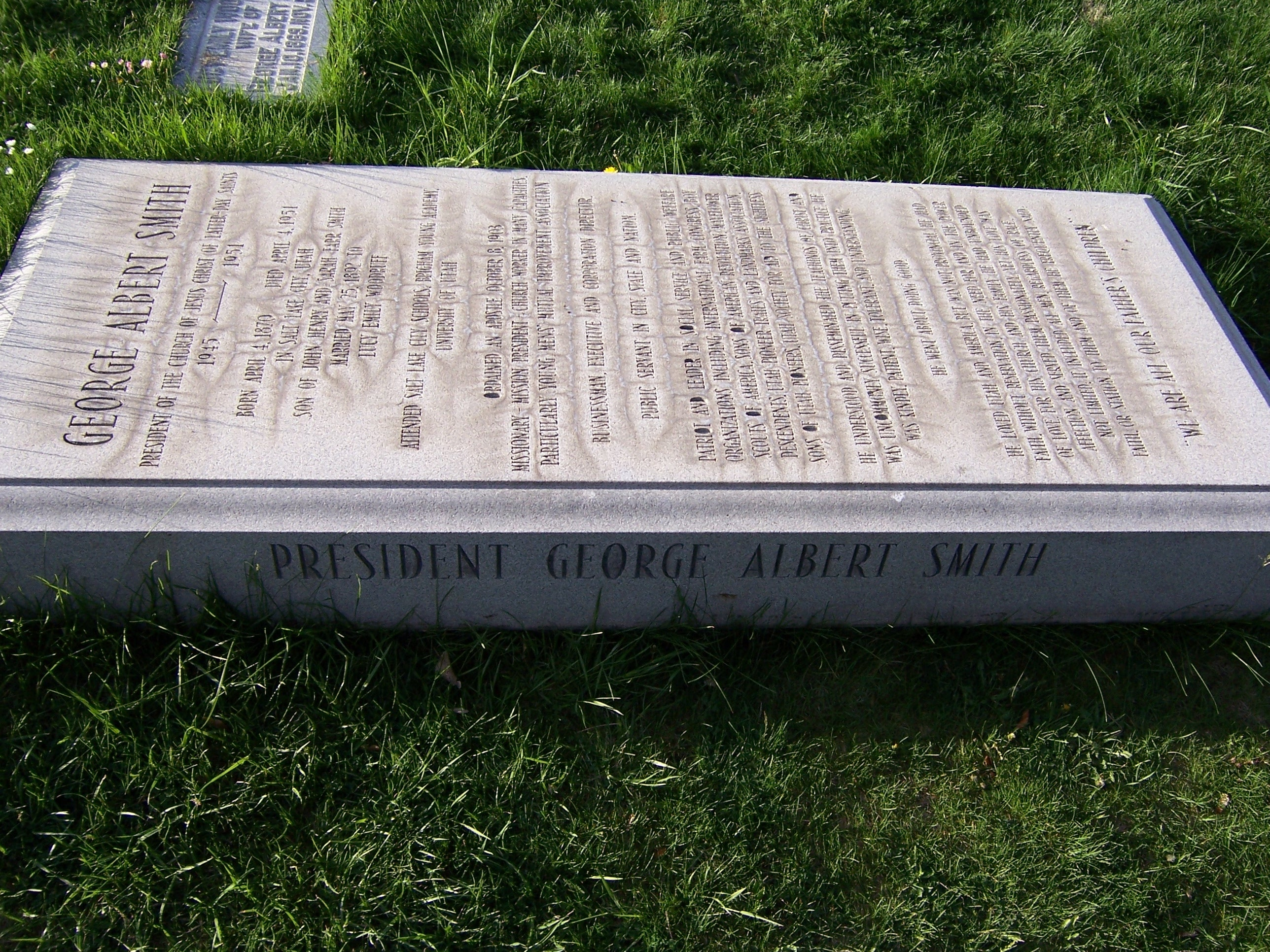
George Albert Smith's grave marker

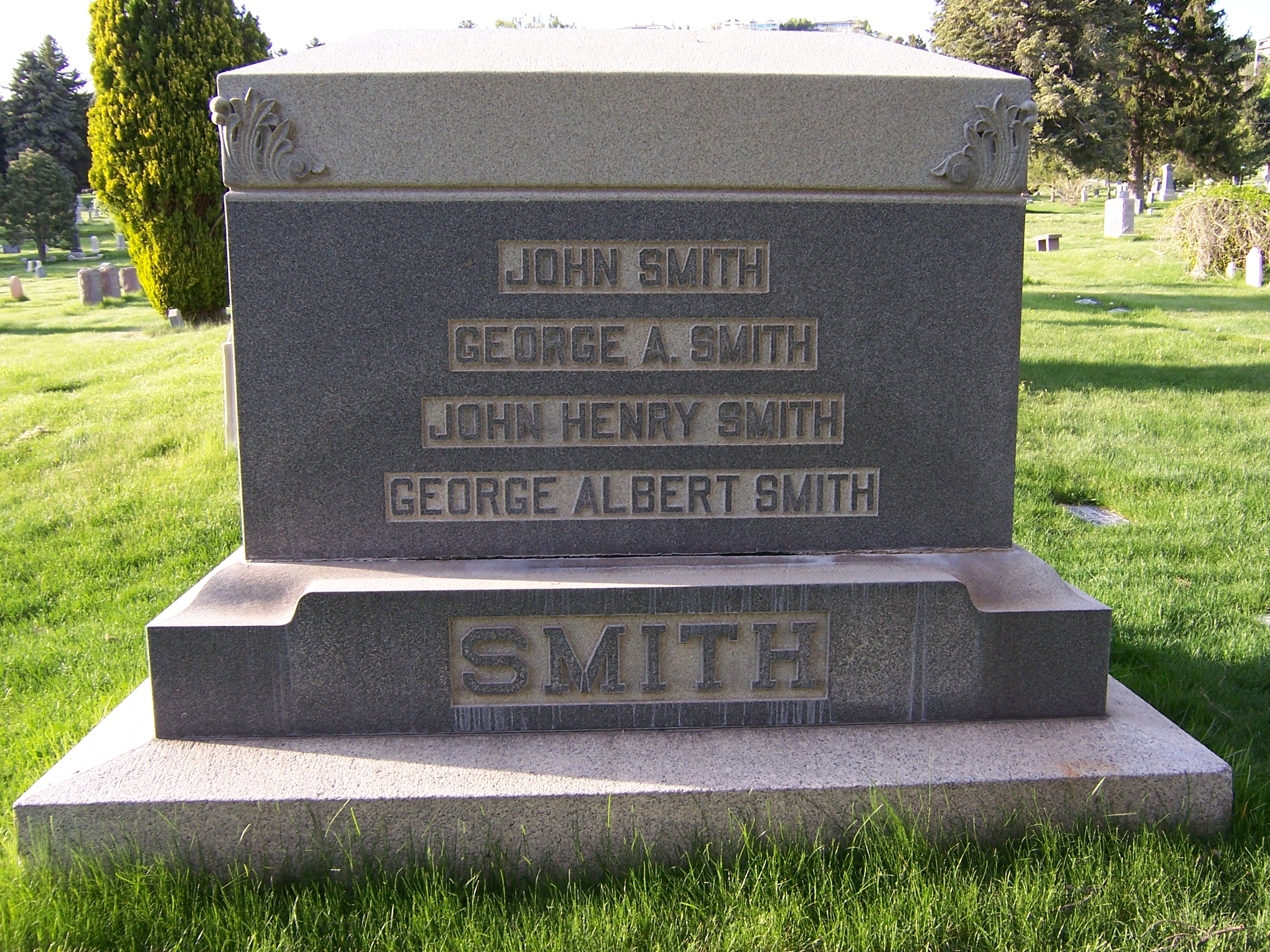
Front side of monument to four generations of a branch of the Smith family, prominent in LDS history.

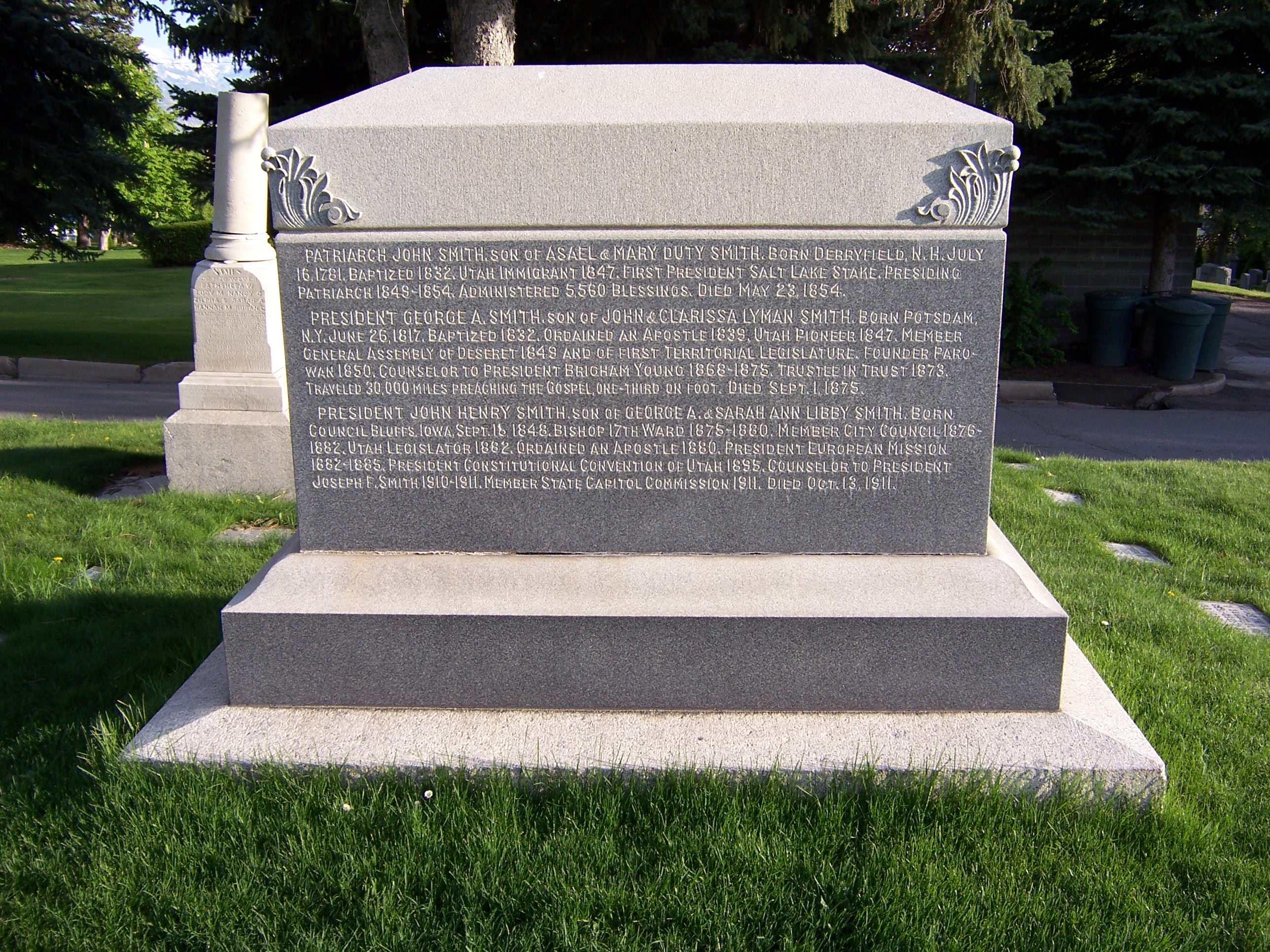
Back side of monument to four generations of a branch of the Smith family, prominent in LDS history.

Smith's teachings as an apostle were the 2012 course of study in the LDS Church's Sunday Relief Society and Melchizedek priesthood classes.

== Ancestry ==
8. John Smith
4. George A. Smith
9. Clarissa Lyman
2. John Henry Smith
10. Nathaniel Libby
5. Sarah Ann Libby
11. Tirzah Lord
1. George Albert Smith Sr.
12. Winslow Farr
6. Lorin Farr
13. Olive Hovey Freeman
3. Sarah Farr
14. Ezra Chase
7. Nancy Bailey Chase
15. Tirzah Wells

== Works ==
- Smith, George Albert (1951). Sayings of a Saint. Alice K. Chase.
- —— (1948). Sharing the Gospel With Others: Excerpts from the Sermons of President Smith. compiled by Preston Nibley. Deseret News Press.
- —— (1996). Robert McIntosh and Susan McIntosh. (ed.). The Teachings of George Albert Smith, Eighth President of the Church of Jesus Christ of Latter-day Saints. Bookcraft, Inc.
- —— (2011). Teachings of Presidents of the Church: George Albert Smith. The Church of Jesus Christ of Latter-day Saints.

== See also ==
The Church of Jesus Christ of Latter-day Saints titles
Preceded by Heber J. Grant	President of the Church; May 21, 1945–April 4, 1951	Succeeded by David O. McKay
Preceded by Rudger Clawson	President of the Quorum of the Twelve Apostles; June 21, 1943–May 21, 1945	Succeeded by George F. Richards
Preceded by Hyrum M. Smith	Quorum of the Twelve Apostles; October 8, 1903–May 21, 1945	Succeeded by Charles W. Penrose
Preceded by Anthony W. Ivins	Superintendent of the Young Men's Mutual Improvement Association; 1921–1935	Succeeded by Albert E. Bowen
