= La Rama Mexicana =

La Rama Mexicana, later known as the Lucero Ward, was one of the first Spanish-language congregations of The Church of Jesus Christ of Latter-day Saints in the United States. The branch began meeting in 1920. Prior to its creation, Church congregations in languages other than English existed in small numbers. La Rama Mexicana was formed after a group of Mexican members of the Church petitioned to receive church instruction in Spanish. The branch encountered many challenges in its early years, including lack of church materials in Spanish, White branch leadership, and cultural differences. Eventually, in 1960, La Rama Mexicana became the Lucero Ward. This change showed that the branch had experienced major growth in the forty years since its creation. Throughout the years, the congregation met in several different locations, including a local restaurant. Today, the Lucero Ward is still present in Salt Lake City, Utah. Many language-based/cultural congregations of The Church of Jesus Christ of Latter-day Saints now exist in the United States.

== History ==
=== Mexican members of the Church of Jesus Christ of Latter-day Saints in Utah ===
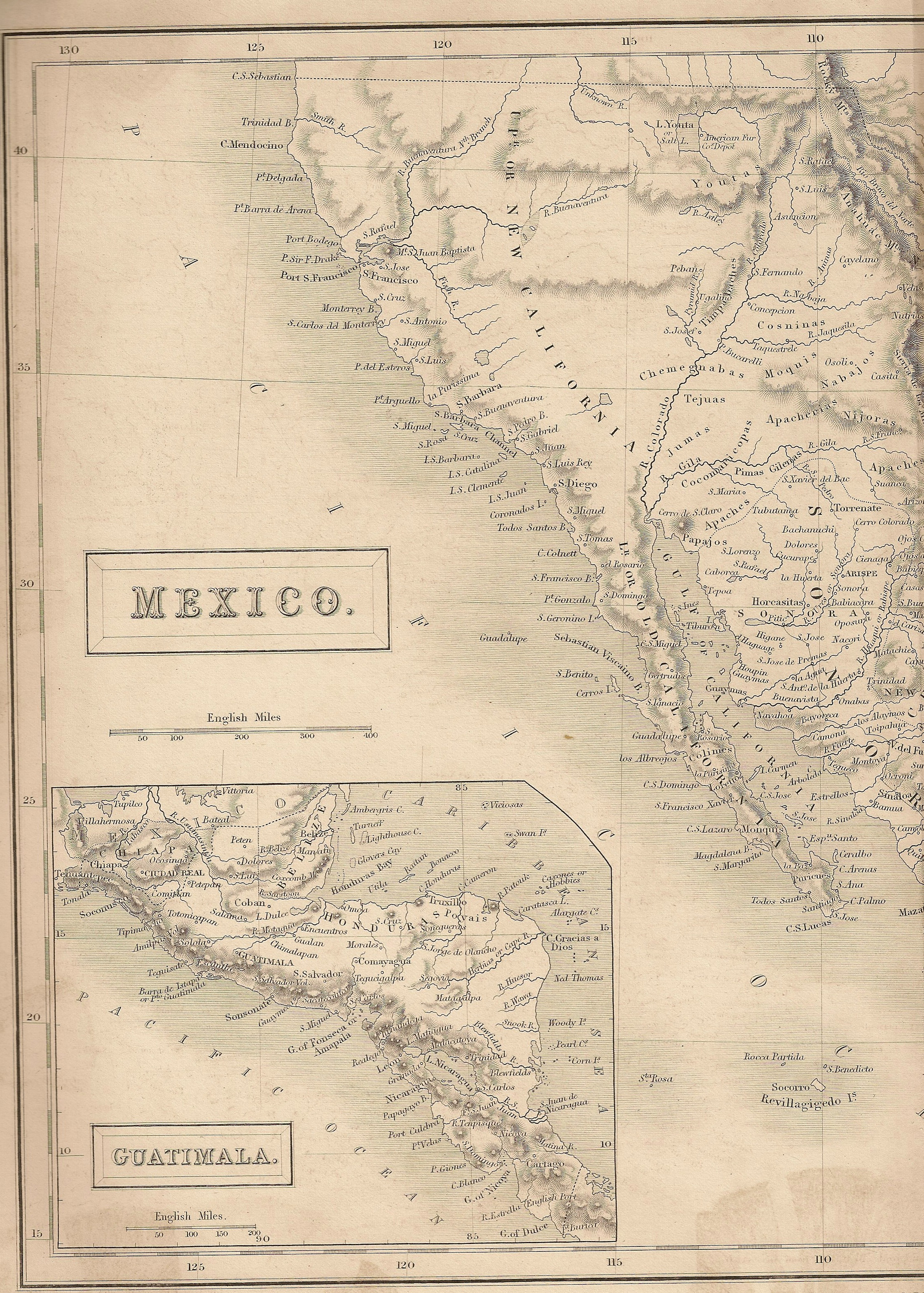
Map showing Utah in 1838 when it was part of Mexico. From Britannica 7th edition.

The first Mexican influence in Utah was part of the Spanish exploration of the western United States. However, these explorers did not stay in Utah, and the Mormon Pioneers were the first of European descent to settle in the state when they arrived in 1847. The Mormon Pioneers were a group of early members of The Church of Jesus Christ of Latter-day Saints that migrated from the Midwestern United States to Utah to flee religious persecution.

The first Mexican Members of The Church of Jesus Christ of Latter-day Saints in Utah were Domitila, Agustina, and Dolores Rivera. They joined the Church in Mexico before migrating to Utah. The Rivera sisters, along with Margarito Bautista, José Zúñiga, Francisco Solano, and Juan Ramón Martínez proselytized among the Mexican community in northern Utah at the end of the 1910s, significantly increasing the number of Mexican members of the Church in Utah.

Today, 35 percent of the members of The Church of Jesus Christ of Latter-day Saints in the United States live in Utah. Seven percent of the members of the Church in the US are Hispanic and 12 percent of Utah's population is Hispanic.

=== Creation of the branch ===
Due to the proselytization of early Mexican members of the Church in Utah, Spanish-speaking membership gradually increased. In 1920, Margarito Bautista, Francisco Solano, and Juan Ramón Martínez went to President Anthony W. Ivins, who was in the first presidency of the Church at the time, to ask for permission to create a Spanish-language group of the Church. November 1920 marked the first meeting of the Rama Mexicana in Martínez's restaurant with 19 baptized church members and 33 nonmembers in attendance. Bautista, Solano, Martínez, and José Cordero formed the first branch presidency with Bautista as president. Before being named the Rama Mexicana, the group was briefly called the "Temporary Lamanite Mission" and the "Local Mexican Mission". In 1923, the group became an official branch of the Church and was dubbed the Rama Mexicana.

=== Challenges ===
La Rama Mexicana experienced many challenges in the first several years of existence. One of these challenges came from combining diverse cultures into one social group. The members of La Rama Mexicana were mostly of Mexican descent, but also included members from other Spanish-speaking countries. Even Mexican members identified with their regional cultural identities more than their Mexican nationalism. The members of the branch also differed in their levels/rates of assimilation which caused them to view situations differently. One way in which they differed was in their opinions of the White leadership of the congregation. As a consequence of the conflict between Margarito Bautista and Francisco Solano over branch leadership (see Leadership and Members), general Church authorities called White branch presidents to preside over the branch for the next 40 years. Some saw this as a blessing because the White members usually had more experience in the Church. Others, however, felt that "it was time for a Mexican to run the Mexican branch." To them, Whites in the branch presidency and other leadership positions took leadership and growth opportunities away from the Latino members.

Another area of friction between La Rama and general Church leadership was the philosophy of "Lamanite Identity". Margarito Bautista was an avid proponent of the claim that Mexicans were descendants of the Lamanite people from the Book of Mormon who would convert to Christianity as part "God's chosen people". However, the church at this time was "an American-focused, middle-class triumphant gospel, where white saints were the norm". As the first congregation of its kind, La Rama Mexicana had to challenge this norm.

Additionally, many of the members of La Rama Mexicana came from Catholic backgrounds and were relatively new to the LDS faith. They were learning the culture of a new country, working to create a better life, not to mention learning the culture of a new religion, which often demanded more of them than they were used to.

Initially, lack of church materials in Spanish proved to be a barrier to the growth of the branch. Eduardo Balderas, an active member of the Rama Mexicana, was hired by the Church to translate Latter-day Saint scripture, music, temple ceremonies, and other resources into Spanish. He lived in Texas and moved to Salt Lake City when the translation job opportunity came.

=== Interfaith interaction and community involvement ===
La Rama Mexicana was influential in creating a center for Hispanic culture and heritage in Salt Lake City. The members of the branch created a social network that provided them with opportunities for marriage, employment, and education. During the Great Depression, members of La Rama Mexicana fared better than other Utah Latinos due to their ties to the Church. La Rama Mexicana and the Catholic Church in Salt Lake City had mostly friendly relations. Catholics were welcomed at La Rama Mexicana events. LDS and Catholic youth often mingled and dated each other. Some Catholics, however, felt that their religious affiliation alienated them from the Hispanic community in Utah which was mostly made up of Latter-day Saints, especially as membership in La Rama Mexicana increased. Members of La Rama Mexicana considered themselves members of the global LDS community, but also maintained their ethnic community identities.

=== La Rama Mexicana to Lucero Ward ===
The Church of Jesus Christ of Latter-day Saints has two types of congregations: branches and wards. Branches and wards essentially serve the same function, and differ in that branches are smaller than wards. According to the General Handbook of the Church, language-based wards require at least 125 members and 15 active, full-tithe-paying Melchizedek Priesthood holders capable of serving in leadership positions. Language-based branches have no minimum number of members, but require 4 active, full-tithe-paying Melchizedek Priesthood holders capable of serving in leadership positions. La Rama Mexicana experienced a large expansion in its membership over the decades after its creation, and there 467 members by 1960 when it was changed to the Lucero Ward. The membership had increased so much that not only did the branch receive ward status, but two other Spanish-language branches were created in the area around this same time. The different Spanish-language congregations divided the members by the geography of where they lived.

== Leadership and members ==
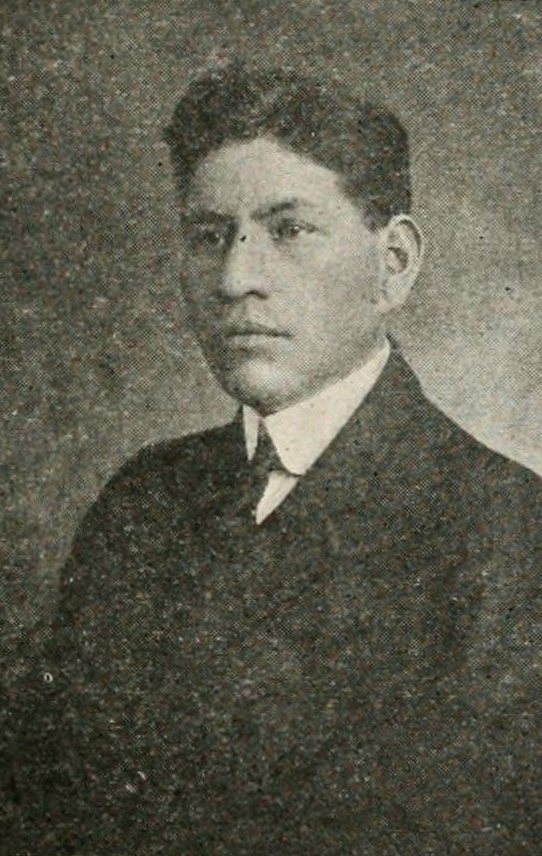
Margarito Bautista in 1920, the same year he became the first president of La Rama Mexicana.

The first president of La Rama Mexicana was Margarito Bautista. When Bautista was called on a church genealogical mission to Mexico in 1922, Francisco Solano took his place as branch president. Bautista returned from Mexico in 1924, and controversy erupted in the branch over who was the rightful leader. General Church authorities got involved and replaced both Bautista and Solano with a White branch president. The branch was led by Anglo-American presidents for the next 40 years. This disconcerted many branch members who felt that the Mexican members needed opportunities to learn valuable leadership skills and that the White leaders did not understand the struggles of the Mexican branch members. The congregation's leadership remained White until 1966, when Orlando Rivera was called as bishop of the Lucero Ward.

When the congregation started, the members were almost all Mexican, hence the name, La Rama Mexicana. As more Spanish-speaking people joined the Church or those who were already members migrated to Utah, the congregation included more members from other Latin American countries.

== Meetinghouses and locations ==
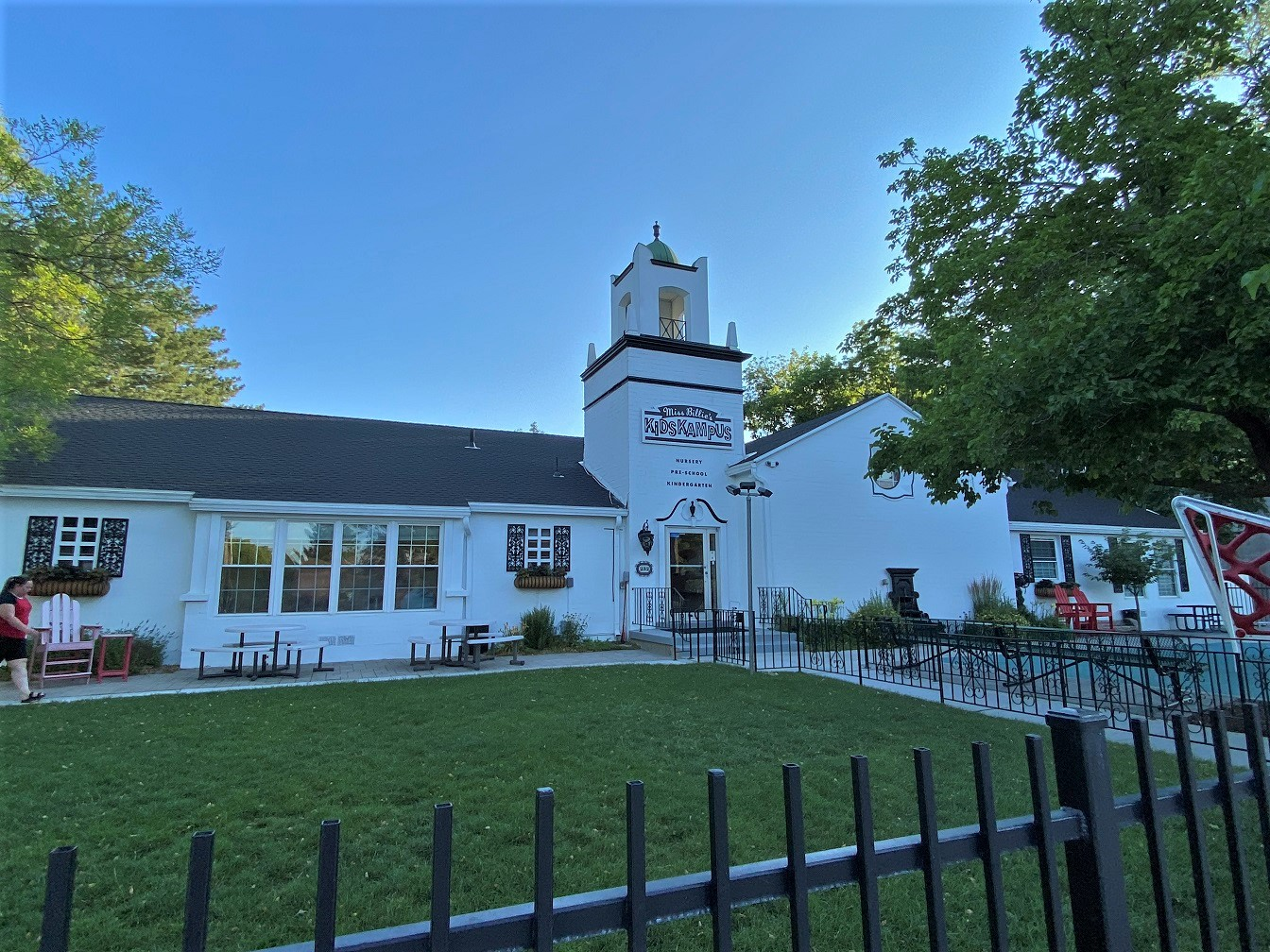
The meetinghouse for La Rama Mexicana, finished in 1950. It is now a preschool/kindergarten.

The first meeting location of La Rama Mexicana was Juan Ramón Martínez's restaurant in Salt Lake City. When the group no longer fit in Martínez's restaurant, they rented a space in a hall near the Denver Rio Grande Depot. They also met for a short time in Salt Lake City's Pioneer Park in the hopes of gaining the attention of prospective church members. In 1925, the congregation moved to a traditional meetinghouse of The Church of Jesus Christ of Latter-day Saints in Salt Lake City. La Rama Mexicana received its own dedicated meetinghouse in 1950, 30 years after the branch's conception.

== Language-based and cultural congregations ==
La Rama Mexicana was the first of many language-based/cultural congregations of the Church of Jesus Christ of Latter-day Saints in the United States. In 1962, the Lucero Ward was split into three Spanish-language congregations to accommodate for the growing number of Latino members of the Church in Utah. The number of Spanish-language congregations in the Salt Lake Valley had grown to 180 in 2023. In 2024, the Church created its first Spanish-language stake, consisting of 8 Spanish-language congregations. In the United States, there are nearly 1,000 language-based congregations, the majority of these being Spanish-speaking.

The Church's position on language-based congregations has changed over time. They have alternated between promoting assimilation through less language-based congregations and embracing the global and culturally diverse church membership through more language-based congregations. The 1960s was a period of expansion for language-based congregations, while a decision by Church leadership in 1972 called for a reduction of language-based congregations. However, the policy was changed again in 1977, allowing for an increase in language-based congregations.
