= Antoine R. Ivins =

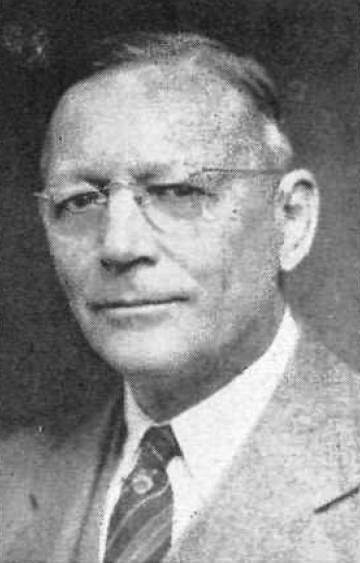

First Council of the Seventy
- October 4, 1931 – October 18, 1967
- Called by: Heber J. Grant

Personal details
- Born: Antoine Ridgeway Ivins; May 11, 1881; St. George, Utah Territory, United States
- Died: October 18, 1967 (aged 86); Salt Lake City, Utah, United States
- Resting place: Salt Lake City Cemetery; 40.777°N 111.858°W
- Alma mater: University of Michigan
- Spouse(s): Vilate Ellen Romney; Edna Robbins
- Parents: Anthony W. Ivins; Elizabeth A. Snow

Antoine Ridgeway Ivins (May 11, 1881 – October 18, 1967) was a member of the First Council of the Seventy of the Church of Jesus Christ of Latter-day Saints from 1931 until his death.

== Youth and family ==
Ivins was born in St. George, Utah Territory. Ivins spent some of his younger years in Mexico. Ivins was the son of Anthony W. Ivins, an LDS apostle and counselor in the First Presidency. His mother was Elizabeth Ashby Snow Ivins, the daughter of LDS Apostle Erastus Snow.

Ivins studied law in Mexico City. He also studied at the University of Michigan and the University of Utah. Ivins received a degree from the University of Utah.

In 1912, Ivins married Vilate Ellen Romney. Following his wife Vilate's death in 1964, Ivins married Edna Robbins.

== Church service ==
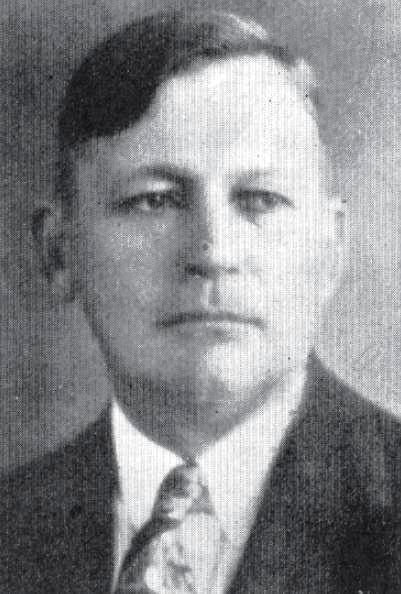
Ivins ca. 1936

From 1921 to 1931 Ivins managed the LDS Church's sugar cane plantation in Laie, Hawaii.

From 1931 until 1933 Ivins was the president of the Mexican Mission of the LDS Church. He succeeded Rey L. Pratt in this position. At this time, the mission not only had responsibility for all of Mexico, but also for all proselytizing efforts among the Spanish-speaking populations of the Southwest United States. Ivins performed the first translation of the temple endowment into a language other than English: in cooperation with Eduardo Balderas, he translated it into Spanish.

During the 1930s, after his return from serving as president of the Mexican Mission, Ivins worked on translating the Doctrine and Covenants and the Pearl of Great Price into Spanish.

From 1931 until his death, Ivins was a member of the First Council of the Seventy. He was the presiding member of the Council from 1963. He also served as a member of the General Welfare Advisory Committee of the Church.
