= George Albert Smith Jr. =

Smith, c. 1941

George Albert Smith Jr. (1905–1969) was a professor at Harvard Business School who wrote several books on management practice and other issues.

Smith was the only son and third child of George Albert Smith, who would become the eighth president of the Church of Jesus Christ of Latter-day Saints (LDS Church), and his wife Lucy Woodruff. Lucy was the daughter of Wilford Woodruff Jr., a son of Wilford Woodruff, who was the fourth president of the LDS Church. At the time of George Albert Smith Jr.'s birth his father was a member of the Quorum of the Twelve Apostles.

As a young man, Smith was a missionary for the LDS Church in Switzerland and Germany.

Smith received his bachelor's degree from the University of Utah and a graduate degree in business administration from Harvard University. He served as student body president of the Harvard Business School Association from 1933 to 1934. In 1934 he was appointed a member of the editorial board of the Harvard Business Review.

From 1934, Smith was a professor at Harvard Business School. During the 1950s, he was one of the main proponents of sizing a business's competitive strategy in light of the general trends in its specific market. Smith is also credited as one of the principal developers of SWOT analysis.

In July 1935, Smith married Ruth Nowell in the Salt Lake Temple. They had three sons, who all attended Harvard Business School.

Smith wrote three books: Policy Formulation and Administration (1951), Managing Geographically Decentralized Companies (1958), and Business, Society, and the Individual (1962).
