= Anthony W. Ivins =

American Mormon leader (1852–1934)

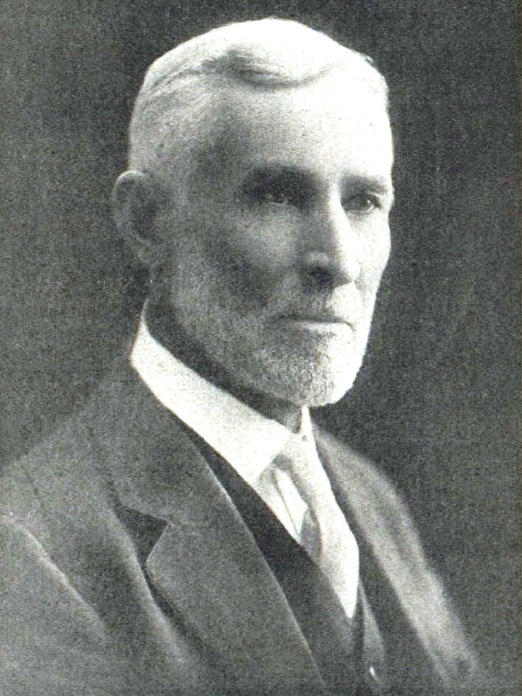
- Ivins in 1921

First Counselor in the First Presidency
- May 25, 1925 – September 23, 1934
- Called by: Heber J. Grant
- Predecessor: Charles W. Penrose
- Successor: J. Reuben Clark

Second Counselor in the First Presidency
- March 10, 1921 – May 25, 1925
- Called by: Heber J. Grant
- Predecessor: Charles W. Penrose
- Successor: Charles W. Nibley
- End reason: Called as First Counselor in the First Presidency

Quorum of the Twelve Apostles
- October 6, 1907 – March 10, 1921
- Called by: Joseph F. Smith
- End reason: Called as Second Counselor in the First Presidency

LDS Church Apostle
- October 6, 1907 – September 23, 1934
- Called by: Joseph F. Smith
- Reason: Death of George Teasdale
- Reorganization at end of term: Alonzo A. Hinckley ordained; David O. McKay added to First Presidency

Personal details
- Born: Anthony Woodward Ivins; September 16, 1852; Toms River, New Jersey, US
- Died: September 23, 1934 (aged 82); Salt Lake City, Utah, US
- Resting place: Salt Lake City Cemetery; 40.777°N 111.858°W
- Spouse(s): Elizabeth A. Snow
- Children: 9, including Antoine R. Ivins
- Parents: Israel Ivins; Ann Lowrie

Anthony Woodward Ivins (September 16, 1852 – September 23, 1934) was an apostle of the Church of Jesus Christ of Latter-day Saints (LDS Church) and was a member of the church's First Presidency from 1921 until his death.

== Early life and family ==
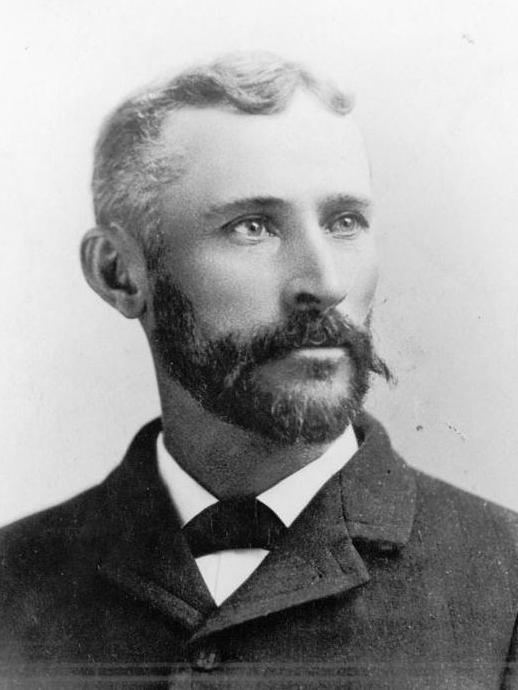
Ivins, c. 1885

Ivins was born in Toms River, New Jersey. When Ivins was still an infant, his parents migrated to Utah Territory. In 1861, they moved in St. George, Utah, as part of the original settling party for that city.

Ivins was a cousin of Heber J. Grant: Ivins's mother and Grant's mother were sisters, surnamed Ivins, and were distant cousins of Ivins's father. In 1878, Ivins married Elizabeth A. Snow, a daughter of Erastus Snow, an apostle; they had nine children. His son Antoine R. Ivins also served as a general authority of the LDS Church.

== Politics and public service ==
On his return to St. George from an 1877 mission, Ivins was appointed a constable. He later served on the St. George city council and as a prosecuting attorney for Washington County, Utah. He served as mayor of St. George in the early 1890s and later in the House of Representatives of the territorial legislature. Under his administration the city built a canal to St. George.

After a mission to Mexico City, Ivins served as Mohave County Assessor, as special Indian Agent for the Shivwits band of Southern Paiutes, and as a delegate to the 1895 Utah State Constitutional Convention.

Ivins was an avid member of the Democratic Party.

== Church service ==
In 1875, Ivins was part of an exploratory mission that found many sites in New Mexico and Arizona which were later colonized by the Mormons. In 1877, he served a mission to New Mexico, where he focused much of his attention on the Native Americans, but also preached to people of Mexican descent.

In the years immediately after his marriage, he served as a member of the stake high council in St. George. In 1882, Ivins was called on a mission to Mexico City, where he served for about the next two years. He served as the first stake president in Colonia Juárez, Chihuahua; the Juárez Stake was the first stake in Mexico. Ivins served in this position until his call to the Quorum of the Twelve in 1907.

Ivins was ordained an apostle and joined the Quorum of the Twelve Apostles on October 6, 1907, after the death of George Teasdale. From 1918 to 1921, Ivins was the superintendent of the Young Men's Mutual Improvement Association. In 1921, Ivins was called as second counselor to Heber J. Grant in the First Presidency, and was replaced in the Quorum of the Twelve by John A. Widstoe. In 1925, Ivins became the first counselor to Grant in the First Presidency, and he served in this position until his death on September 23, 1934, aged 82.

== Death ==
Ivins died in Salt Lake City of a coronary occlusion. He was buried at Salt Lake City Cemetery.

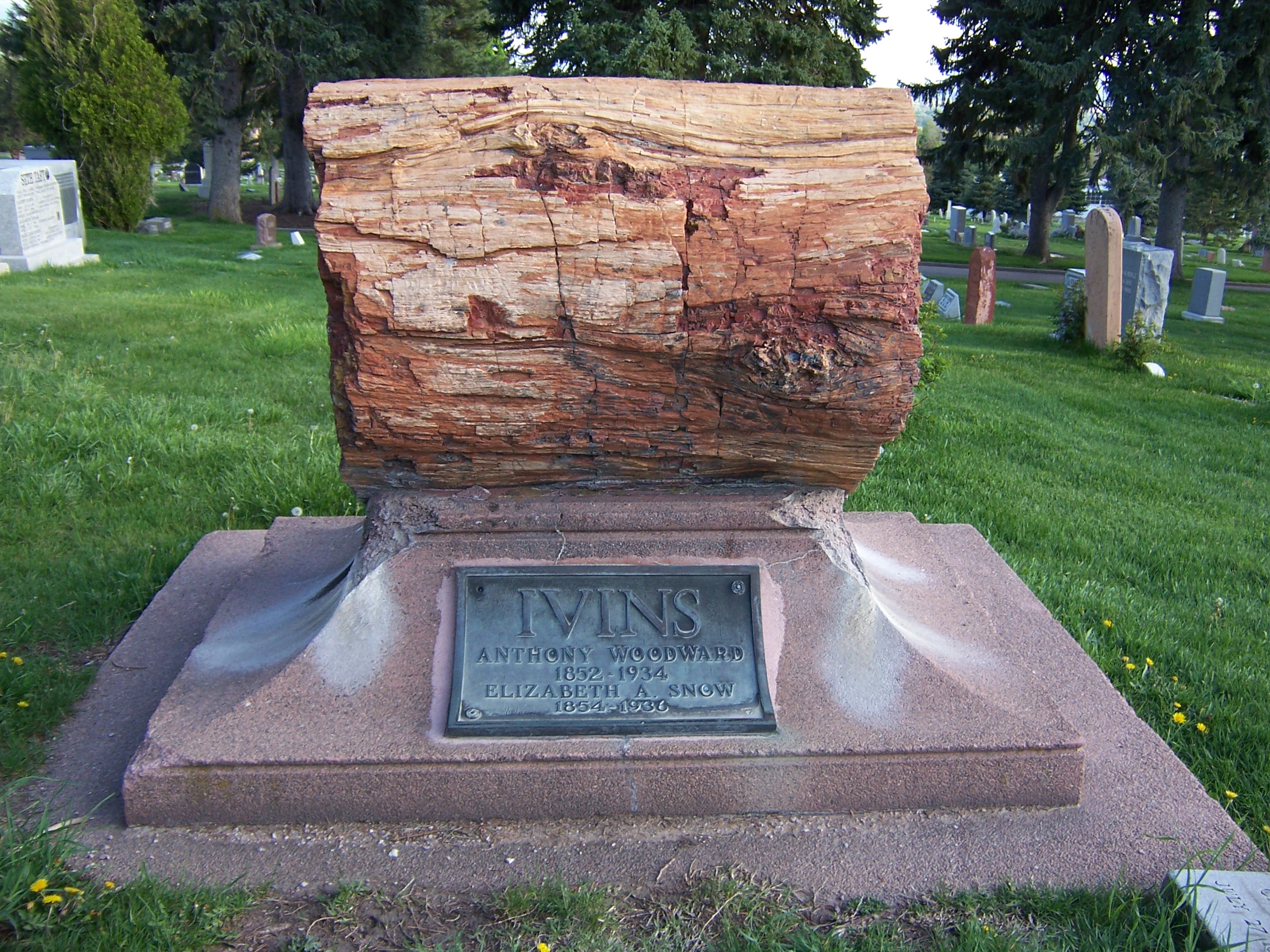
Grave marker of
Anthony W. Ivins.

== Honors ==
The small city of Ivins, Utah, is named after him. Ivins Mountain, located in Zion National Park, was named after him in 1935. In 1958, he was inducted into the Hall of Great Westerners of the National Cowboy & Western Heritage Museum for his contributions to the cattle industry.

The Church of Jesus Christ of Latter-day Saints titles
Preceded by Charles W. Penrose	First Counselor in the First Presidency; May 25, 1925 – September 23, 1934	Succeeded by J. Reuben Clark
Preceded by Charles W. Penrose	Second Counselor in the First Presidency; March 10, 1921 – May 25, 1925	Succeeded by Charles W. Nibley
Preceded by David O. McKay	Quorum of the Twelve Apostles; October 6, 1907 – September 23, 1934	Succeeded by Joseph Fielding Smith
Preceded by Joseph F. Smith	Superintendent of the Young Men’s Mutual Improvement Association; 1918–1921	Succeeded by George Albert Smith
