= Rey Pratt =

American-born missionary (1878–1931)

First Council of the Seventy
- January 29, 1925 – April 14, 1931
- Called by: Heber J. Grant

Personal details
- Born: Rey Lucero Pratt; October 11, 1878; Salt Lake City, Utah Territory, United States
- Died: April 14, 1931 (aged 52); Salt Lake City, Utah, United States
- Spouse(s): Mary Stark
- Parents: Helaman Pratt; Emmeline Billingsley

Rey Lucero Pratt (October 11, 1878 – April 14, 1931) was an American religious leader. He served as a general authority and as a mission president of the Church of Jesus Christ of Latter-day Saints (LDS Church). He served for six years as a general authority and for 23 years as president of the church's Mexican Mission. Pratt helped establish the church in Mexico and among Spanish-speaking populations in the United States and Argentina. He also translated LDS Church materials into Spanish, wrote magazine articles, and spoke several times in the church's general conference.

Pratt has at times been called the father of the Mexican Mission.

== Early life ==
Pratt was born in Salt Lake City, Utah Territory, the fourth child and second son of Helaman Pratt and Emmeline Victoria Billingsley Pratt. When Rey was nine, the Pratts moved to Mexico to help settle Colonia Dublán, a Mormon colony in the northern state of Chihuahua. His father was settling in Mexico to escape being prosecuted by the United States federal government for practicing polygamy. Rey grew up in Mexico, learning to appreciate its history and people.

He married Mary "May" Stark on 8 August 1900 in the Salt Lake Temple. They were the parents of ten children.

== LDS Church Service ==
=== Missionary to Mexico ===
Pratt was set apart by LDS Church apostle Orson F. Whitney as a missionary on 4 October 1906. On 1 November, Pratt arrived by train in Mexico City and reported to the mission home. He served for nearly a year under mission president Hyrum S. Harris, during which time he presided over the Toluca conference for seven months. Then, on 25 August 1907, Harris announced that Pratt would replace him as president of the Mexican Mission. Pratt was set apart by Harris on 29 September and the Pratts moved to Mexico City shortly thereafter.

=== Mission president ===
Pratt started his service as president of the Mexican Mission in 1907. Church membership in Mexico more than doubled during Pratt's first six years as mission president. By 1911, over a thousand church members lived in the Mexican Mission.

Mexico's political climate, however, gradually worsened. Porfirio Diaz, Mexico's longtime dictator, lost control of the government and the Mexican Revolution ensued. Shortly after serious fighting began in Mexico City in 1913, the church's First Presidency authorized the Pratts and the American missionaries to return to the United States. The Pratts moved to Salt Lake City in September 1913 and led the mission via letters from afar. Two years later, the First Presidency again instructed the Pratts to move, this time to Manassa, Colorado, and establish missionary work among Mexicans in the United States. After five years, in November 1918, church leaders moved the mission headquarters to El Paso, Texas, making it closer to the center of the vast mission territory.

In March 1921, Pratt reopened missionary work in Mexico with eight missionaries. In November, jurisdiction of the Juárez Stake in Chihuahua was transferred to the Mexican Mission. This made Pratt president of all the church's Spanish-speaking organizations. He continued to expand the mission, opening up work in southern California in 1924 and establishing a branch in Los Angeles.

=== General authority ===
Pratt's duties expanded further in January 1925, when church leaders called him to be a member of the seven-man First Council of the Seventy. He was surprised when the church leaders did not release him from his mission president duties, but he accepted both callings.

=== Mission to Argentina ===
In the October 1925 general conference, church president Heber J. Grant announced that apostle Melvin J. Ballard and Rulon S. Wells, another seventy, would go with Pratt to establish the LDS Church in South America. Pratt translated for the group. The three boarded the ship, Voltaire, on 14 November 1925 in New York City. The Voltaire stopped in Barbados, Rio de Janeiro, and Montevideo enroute to Buenos Aires, Argentina. The ship arrived at Buenos Aires on 6 December; the three disembarked at seven in the morning and immediately set to work.

In their first week in Argentina, the missionaries baptized six people who had been awaiting their arrival. They also held their first sacrament meeting. They expected to have continued success among the German and Italian immigrants, but the work soon became much more difficult. After a few weeks of hardships, the missionaries shifted their attention to the Spanish-speaking areas of Buenos Aires. They preached mostly in those areas until their departure for the United States in July 1926.

=== Later Mexican period ===
Pratt returned from South America to find Mexico caught up in another internal war, this time over the issue of separation of church and state. The Mexican government had decided to enforce the 1917 Constitution by prohibiting foreign-born ministers from holding authority in Mexico. Despite being prohibited from acting in an official capacity, Pratt continued to attend church meetings in Mexico.

The final years of Pratt's life were busy, and the constant traveling gradually wore him down. Just after the April 1931 general conference, Pratt stayed in Salt Lake City to undergo a hernia operation. While recovering in the hospital, Pratt experienced complications. His condition quickly deteriorated, and he died on 14 April 1931. He left behind his wife and ten living children. On 17 April, his funeral was held in the Assembly Hall on Temple Square. Grant and other general authorities spoke at the service. They expressed regret that Pratt had not lived to see the church grow large in Mexico.

Pratt was responsible for creating a new translation of the Book of Mormon into Spanish and was working on translating the Doctrine and Covenants when he died. He also translated many of the hymns of the church into Spanish. Eduardo Balderas, who had been mentored by Pratt, carried on a considerable amount of this work after Pratt's death.

== See also ==
- Pratt family
