= George Teasdale =

British Mormon leader

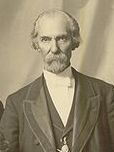

Quorum of the Twelve Apostles
- 16 October 1882 – 9 June 1907

LDS Church Apostle
- 16 October 1882 – 9 June 1907
- Reason: Reorganization of First Presidency and the death of Orson Pratt
- Reorganization at end of term: Anthony W. Ivins ordained

Personal details
- Born: 8 December 1831; London, England, United Kingdom
- Died: 9 June 1907 (aged 75); Salt Lake City, Utah, United States
- Resting place: Salt Lake City Cemetery; 40°46′37.92″N 111°51′28.8″W
- Children: 7

George Teasdale (8 December 1831 – 9 June 1907) was a Mormon missionary and a member of the Quorum of the Twelve Apostles of the Church of Jesus Christ of Latter-day Saints (LDS Church).

Teasdale was born in London, England. Teasdale was baptized into the LDS Church on 8 August 1852, after learning about the church from a Mormon co-worker.

In 1853, Teasdale married Emily Emma Brown, a member of the LDS Church. In 1857, Teasdale became a full-time church missionary in England and Scotland. In 1859, he became the supervisor of the missionaries in Scotland. In 1861, Teasdale was released as a missionary and he and his wife emigrated to Utah Territory.

In Utah, Teasdale taught school and was a member of the Mormon Tabernacle Choir. In 1868–69, he returned to England as a missionary to help British Latter-day Saints migrate to Utah. His wife died in 1874, after he had fathered seven children by her, five of whom died in infancy. The couple had been monogamous, but after Emily's death, he had four more recorded marriages, and possibly as many as 10 more, all without issue. In 1875, he served a mission to Tennessee, North Carolina and Virginia. He became president of the church's Juab Stake.

Teasdale was ordained an apostle on 16 October 1882, by church president John Taylor. Future church president, Heber J. Grant, was ordained an apostle on the same date. Teasdale immediately served a six-month mission to the Indian Territory.

As an apostle, Teasdale served another mission for the church from 1887 to 1890 and he preached in the United Kingdom, France, Switzerland, Germany, Denmark, Sweden, Norway, and Ireland.

In 1891, Teasdale became president of the church's Mexican Mission.

Teasdale died in Salt Lake City at age 75 of an intestinal obstruction. He was buried at Salt Lake City Cemetery in an unmarked grave in his family plot and was succeeded in the Quorum of the Twelve by Anthony W. Ivins.

== Notes ==
The Church of Jesus Christ of Latter-day Saints titles
Preceded by John Henry Smith	Quorum of the Twelve Apostles; 16 October 1882 – 9 June 1907	Succeeded by Heber J. Grant
