= Heber J. Grant =

American religious leader (1856–1945)

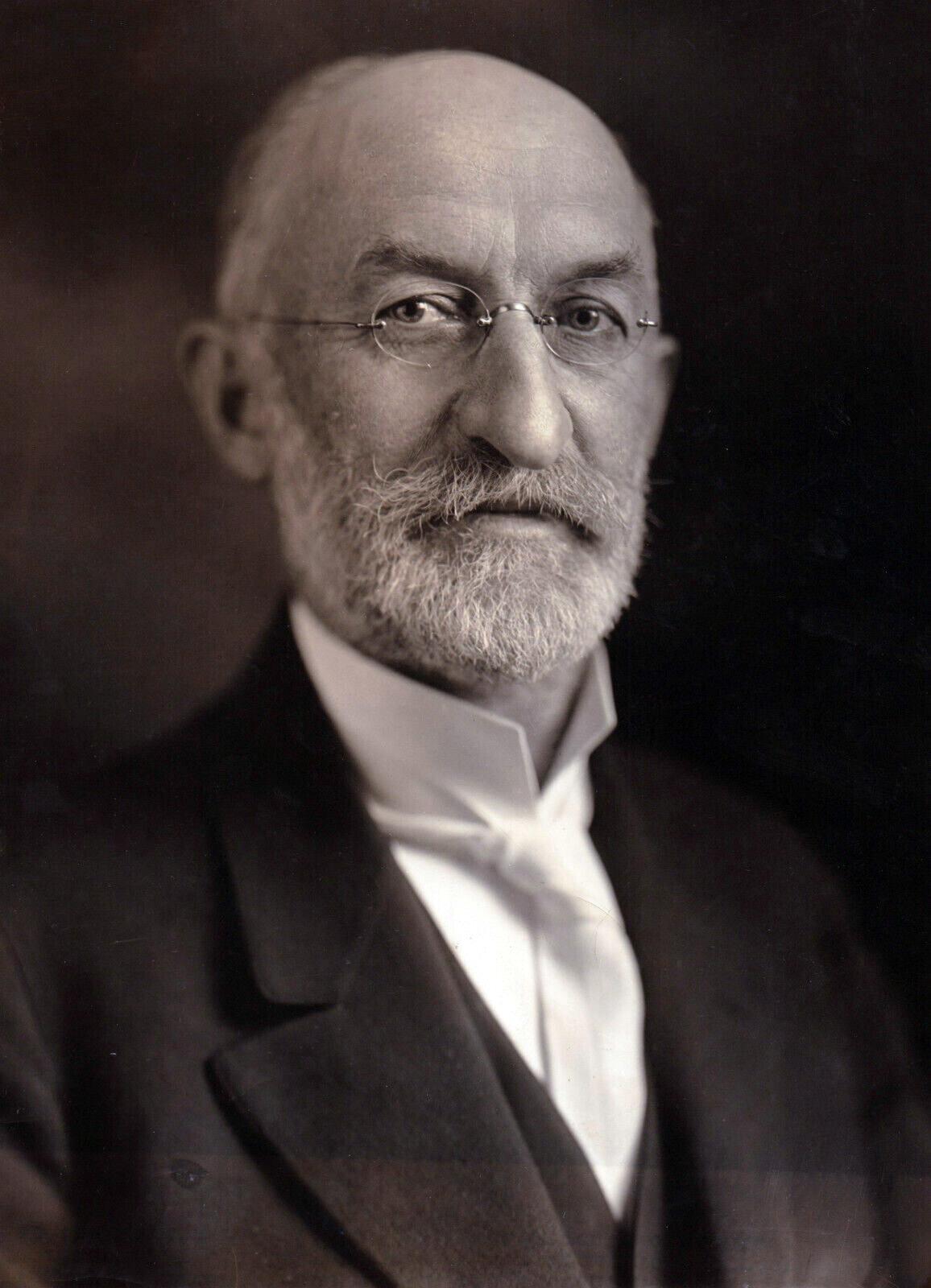
- Grant in 1919

7th President of the Church of Jesus Christ of Latter-day Saints
- November 23, 1918 – May 14, 1945
- Predecessor: Joseph F. Smith
- Successor: George Albert Smith

President of the Quorum of the Twelve Apostles
- November 18, 1916 – November 23, 1918
- Predecessor: Francis M. Lyman
- Successor: Anthon H. Lund
- End reason: Became President of the Church

Quorum of the Twelve Apostles
- October 16, 1882 – November 23, 1918
- Called by: John Taylor
- End reason: Became President of the Church

LDS Church Apostle
- October 16, 1882 – May 14, 1945
- Called by: John Taylor
- Reason: Reorganization of First Presidency and the death of Orson Pratt
- Reorganization at end of term: Matthew Cowley ordained

Personal details
- Born: Heber Jeddy Grant; November 22, 1856; Salt Lake City, Utah Territory, U.S.
- Died: May 14, 1945 (aged 88); Salt Lake City, Utah, U.S.
- Resting place: Salt Lake City Cemetery; 40.777°N 111.858°W
- Spouse(s): Lucy Stringham (m. 1877; died 1893) Hulda Augusta Winters (m. 1884) Emily Harris Wells (m. 1884; died 1908)
- Children: 12
- Parents: Jedediah M. Grant; Rachel R. Ivins
- Signature
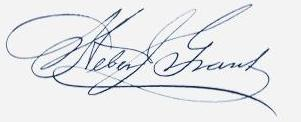

Heber Jeddy Grant (November 22, 1856 – May 14, 1945) was an American religious leader who served as the seventh president of the Church of Jesus Christ of Latter-day Saints (LDS Church). Grant worked as a bookkeeper and a cashier, but was called to be an apostle on October 16, 1882, at age 25. After the death of Joseph F. Smith in late 1918, Grant served as the LDS Church president until his death.

Grant was the first LDS church president born after the exodus to Utah in 1847. He was also the last LDS Church president to have practiced polygamy. Grant had three wives although by the time he became church president in 1918, only his second wife, Augusta Winters, was still living. In business, Grant helped develop the Avenues neighborhood of Salt Lake City. In 1884, he served one term as a representative to the Utah territorial Legislative Assembly.

== Early life ==
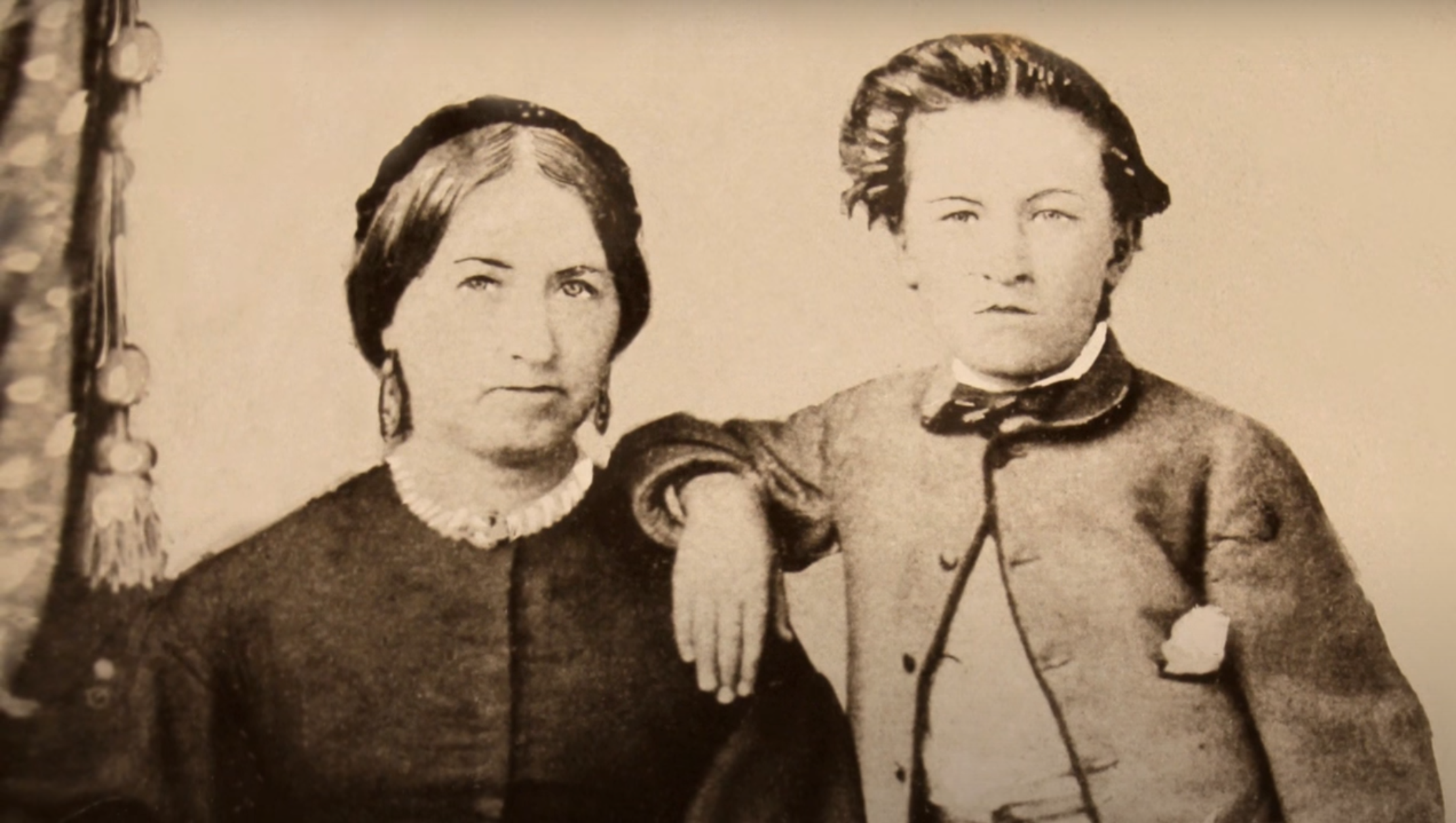
Young Heber J. Grant with his mother Rachel Ivins Grant

Grant was born on November 22, 1856, in Salt Lake City, Utah Territory, the son of Rachel Ridgeway Ivins and Jedediah Morgan Grant. His father was a counselor in the First Presidency to Brigham Young. Rachel Grant was a native of New Jersey, where she had converted to the LDS Church at about 20. Her cousin and later brother-in-law (he married her older sister Anna), Israel Ivins, was the first person baptized a Latter-day Saint in New Jersey.

Jedediah Grant died when Heber J. Grant was nine days old. After Jedediah's death, Rachel married Jedediah's brother, George Grant, but he fell into alcoholism so she divorced him. Rachel became the dominant influence in Heber's life. She served for many years as president of the 13th Ward Relief Society in downtown Salt Lake City.

He was known for his determination to achieve goals that were seemingly beyond his reach. As a child, he wanted to join the baseball team that would win the Utah territorial championship, but others believed him to be too physically awkward to be successful. In response, he purchased a baseball and practiced throwing the ball for hours against his barn to improve. The team that he joined later won the championship. In similar fashion, Grant expressed a desire to be a successful bookkeeper although many of his associates criticized his penmanship. He practiced his writing to the point that he was invited to teach penmanship at one of the local academies.

There were no free public schools in Salt Lake City when Grant was a child, but his mother kept him enrolled in various schools while he grew up.

== Business activities ==
After working as a bookkeeper in the insurance business in 1877, Grant became an assistant cashier with Zion's Savings Bank and afterwards opened an insurance business with Nephi Clayton. Later, Grant became a partner with Benjamin W. E. Jennens. He later founded an additional insurance agency in Ogden and, for a time, owned the Ogden Vinegar Works.

In the late 1890s, Grant served as the business manager for the newly-formed official LDS magazine, the Improvement Era. Grant's insurance company advertised in the publication.

Grant continued to be involved in business activities after his call as an apostle. He founded many new businesses, including a bank. He was a founder of the Utah Sugar Company and the main founder of the Salt Lake Theatre.

Grant lost a large amount of money in the Panic of 1893 and never recovered from its adverse financial effects. He was the main person to negotiate new financing to the LDS Church in New York at the time; his efforts kept the church going until Lorenzo Snow's late 1890s call for tithing placed the church in a better financial situation. He was also instrumental in helping to prevent the concurrent 1893 banking crisis from overwhelming Utah's financial institutions.

== Early LDS Church service ==
Grant was made a block teacher (similar to the modern position of home teacher) when he was still a youth, which was rare at the time. He was ordained a seventy at 15, which was also rare at the time.

In June 1875, when the first Young Men's Mutual Improvement Association (YMMIA) was organized in the Salt Lake 13th Ward, Grant, then 19, was called to serve as a counselor to Junius F. Wells in its presidency.

At 26, he served a mission to the Native Americans from 1883 to 1884.

Grant's early church assignments included service on the Church Salary Committee and the Sunday School General Board. Grant was made Second Assistant in the Superintendency of the General YMMIA in 1898. When Joseph F. Smith became president of the church and head of the YMMIA, Grant was made First Assistant, where he served until he became church president.

In 1880, Grant became president of the Tooele Utah Stake, moving there with his wife, Lucy, and their children. Around then, Lucy began to develop health problems.

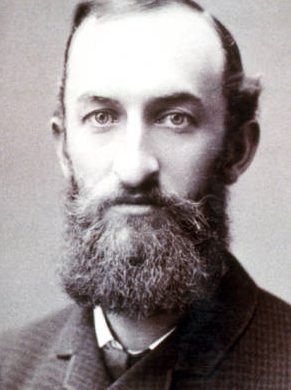
Grant in his early years as an apostle, c. 1880–89

In 1882, Grant was called as a member of the Quorum of the Twelve. Early in his service in the quorum, he made many trips to Arizona, earning the title "The Arizona Apostle". Grant twice served missions among the Yaqui in Mexico.

In 1901, Grant was sent to Japan to open the church's Japanese Mission. He served as the mission president until 1903, when he returned home, but was almost immediately sent to preside over the British and other European missions of the church. He returned from the British mission in 1906.

During the ensuing decade and later, Grant oversaw church education programs, the Genealogical Society of Utah and the Improvement Era.

== Church president ==
Grant succeeded Joseph F. Smith as church president in November 1918. He was not sustained in the position by the general church membership, however, until June 1919 because of the influenza pandemic of 1918, which forced a delay of the church's traditional springtime general conference.

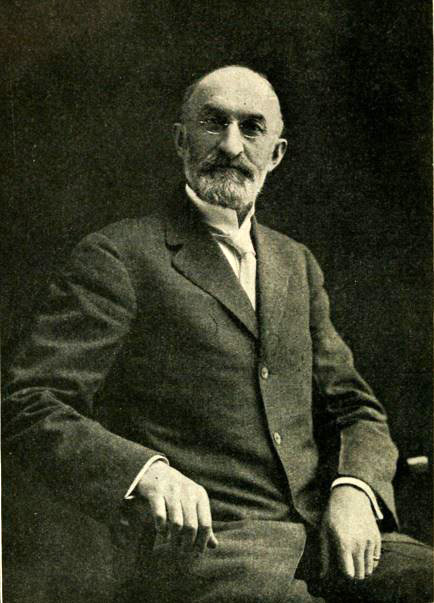
Grant upon becoming church president (late 1918 or early 1919)

During his tenure as church president, Grant enforced the 1890 Manifesto outlawing polygamy and gave guidance as the church's social structure evolved away from its early days of "plural marriage." In 1927, he authorized the implementation of the church's "Good Neighbor" policy, which was intended to reduce antagonism between Latter-day Saints and the US government. Grant dedicated the first temples outside of Utah since Kirtland and Nauvoo. The first was the Hawaii Temple, followed by the Alberta Temple, the first outside the United States, and the Arizona Temple. The church also began the Idaho Falls Temple, which was not completed until after his death.

Also under Grant, the first stakes outside the Intermountain West were organized. The first stake in Los Angeles was organized in the 1920s. Grant still operated on old methods such as personally asking LeGrand Richards to move to California with the intention of calling him as a stake president there. He also personally negotiated the purchase of the land on which the Los Angeles Temple would be built.

In the 1930s, stakes were organized in New York and Chicago and in the 1940s in Portland, Oregon, and Washington, DC. Grant presided at the dedication of an LDS chapel in Washington, DC, in 1933, which was seen to mark a new phase of nationwide expansion in the church.

In 1935, Grant excommunicated members of the church in Short Creek, Arizona, who refused to sign the loyalty pledge to the church that included a renunciation of plural marriage. That signaled the formal beginning of the Mormon fundamentalist movement, and some of the excommunicated members went on to found the Fundamentalist Church of Jesus Christ of Latter Day Saints.

One of Grant's greatest legacies as president is the church's welfare program, which he instituted in 1936: "our primary purpose was to set up, insofar as it might be possible, a system under which the curse of idleness would be done away with, the evils of a dole abolished, and independence, industry, thrift and self-respect be once more established amongst our people. The aim of the Church is to help the people help themselves." Grant also placed strong emphasis on the importance of sacrament meeting attendance and oversaw expansion of the seminary program and the creation of the institute of religion.

His administration also emphasized the practice of the LDS health code, known as the Word of Wisdom. During the early 1900s, general authorities differed in their observance of the proscription against beer, wine, tobacco, coffee and tea, but among the apostles, Grant was one of the most vocal in opposing such substances. In 1921, Grant's administration made adherence to the health code compulsory for advancement in the priesthood or for entrance to temples. Grant also spoke out in favor of Utah's Prohibition movement, which occurred around the same time.

Despite being a Democrat, Grant was opposed to the election of U.S. President Franklin Roosevelt and wrote a front-page editorial for the Deseret News urging church members not to vote for him during the 1936 election. Grant shared the view of J. Reuben Clark and David O. McKay that the New Deal was socialism, which they all despised. Roosevelt greatly alienated Grant also for opposing Prohibition, another subject.

Roosevelt still won Utah in each of his four presidential elections. Grant regarded that as "one of the most serious conditions that has confronted me since I became President of the Church." Later, when Utah voters agreed by plebiscite to become the 36th state to ratify the Twenty-first Amendment to the United States Constitution, thus completing the process of ratification and repealing prohibition, Grant was devastated. In a general conference, he told the Latter-day Saints, "I have never felt so humiliated in my life over anything as that the State of Utah voted for the repeal of Prohibition."

Under Grant's administration, the position of Assistant to the Quorum of the Twelve was created.

== Death ==
Grant died in Salt Lake City, at age 88, from cardiac failure as a result of arteriosclerosis. As he had been the final surviving member of the church's Council of Fifty, his death marked the formal end of the organization. He was buried at Salt Lake City Cemetery on May 18, 1945.

== Legacy ==
Grant's teachings as an apostle were the 2004 course of study in the LDS Church's Sunday Relief Society and Melchizedek priesthood classes.

== Wives ==
Grant was the last LDS Church president known to practice polygamy. He married a first time in 1877 and then twice more in 1884. However, by the time he became church president, only one of his wives, Augusta, was still alive.

One of his grandchildren was longtime CBS News producer Leslie Midgley, last husband of Betty Furness.

=== Lucy Stringham ===
Grant married Lucy Stringham (1858–1893) on November 1, 1877. She was a daughter of Bryant Stringham, who came to the Salt Lake Valley with Brigham Young in 1847.

Lucy had been closely associated with Grant essentially from her birth, and they attended Mary Cook's school together. Like Grant, she was a member of the 13th Ward. It was not until Grant broke off his courtship with Emily H. Wells (see below) that he started actively courting Lucy. Lucy was initially reticent to fully accept Grant's advances, seeing herself as just a temporary replacement for Emily, but after he regularly walked her home from church services for several weeks without being invited into the Stringham home, she gave up and invited him in. They married a few months later. For a time, Lucy was a school teacher.

Grant felt very close to Lucy. On an early assignment as a member of the Quorum of the Twelve in Arizona, he surprised his traveling companion, Brigham Young Jr., with how many letters he wrote to Lucy.

Lucy and Grant would become the parents of six children. He praised her "business foresight and judgment" and credited her with much of his business success. She died in 1893 after a long illness during which he gave constant, tender devotion to her, as he had given throughout their marriage.

=== Augusta Winters ===
Grant married Hulda Augusta Winters (1856–1952) on May 26, 1884. She was a school teacher for a time and was described as the ablest school teacher in Utah Territory. In the late 1880s, Augusta took up residence in New York City to try and prevent Grant's arrest on polygamy charges. Augusta bore one daughter. She accompanied Grant to Japan when he was sent to open the Japanese mission in 1901. She would often travel with him when he was president of the church, especially when he went to address non-Mormon audiences. She died in 1952.

=== Emily H. Wells ===
Grant married Emily Harris Wells (1857–1908) on May 27, 1884. She was a daughter of Daniel H. Wells.

Emily and Grant were five months apart in age and from Emily's birth she had been Grant's next-door neighbor. They were among the most prominent young orators in Salt Lake society in the 1870s, both connected with the Wasatch Literary Association and Grant was a counselor to Emily's brother in the 13th Ward YMMIA presidency. The marriage of Grant and Emily was expected by all who knew them. However, Emily then announced publicly her opposition to polygamy, which caused a falling-out between Grant and Emily.

Emily was a full sister of Briant H. Wells, who was a Major General in the United States Army. Another of her brothers, Heber M. Wells, later the first governor of the State of Utah, stayed with her for part of the time of her exile in Manassa, Colorado.

Emily attended the University of Deseret. For a time, she was a school teacher. In 1883, Grant asked Emily to marry him. Since she had not renounced her dislike for polygamy, and he was already married to Lucy, that was in many ways a very daring move on his part, and she initially declined his request. Emily then had a change of heart and she and Grant married on May 27, 1884. Since the Edmunds Act had been enacted in 1882, the situation of Mormon polygamists was far worse than it had been a decade earlier, when Emily had first renounced polygamy. To avoid Grant having to go to prison on charges of unlawful cohabitation, Emily went to England to live at the LDS mission home to have her first child. She returned to the United States 16 months later and moved between multiple locations in Utah and Idaho Territoris to avoid capture.

In 1889, to avoid being forced to testify in pending unlawful cohabitation charges against her husband, Emily went to Manassa, where she stayed for a year and a half. Grant accompanied her on the train ride from Pueblo, Colorado, to Manassa, having been on a different train on the previous part of the journey to avoid arrest. Grant stayed two weeks set up for Emily the most comfortable house in the town, and left his mother to help Emily. She remained in Manassa until March 1891, when she returned to Salt Lake City.

Emily and Grant were the parents of four daughters and a son. The son, Daniel Wells Grant, died while he was still a child. Emily's last child was born in 1899, when she was 42, the same year Grant pleaded guilty to unlawful cohabitation and paid a $100 fine.

Emily accompanied Grant when he served as mission president in England. She brought her four daughters and two of Lucy's daughters. Because of their daughters' presence, the Grants relocated the mission home to a more respectable part of Liverpool.

Emily developed stomach cancer in 1907, which caused her death in 1908. At the time of her death, she was considered one of the most prominent women in Salt Lake City.

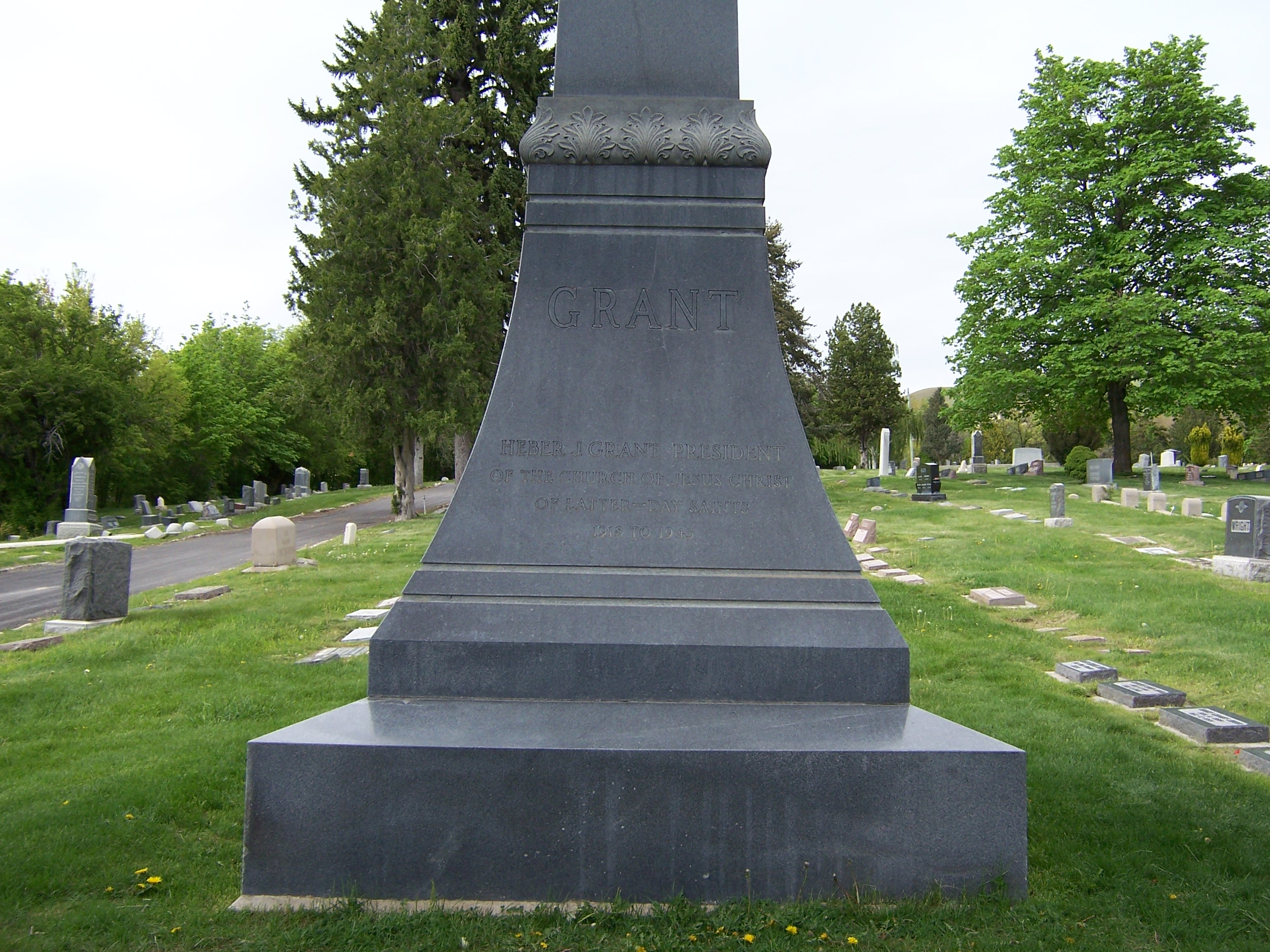
Grave monument of Heber J. Grant

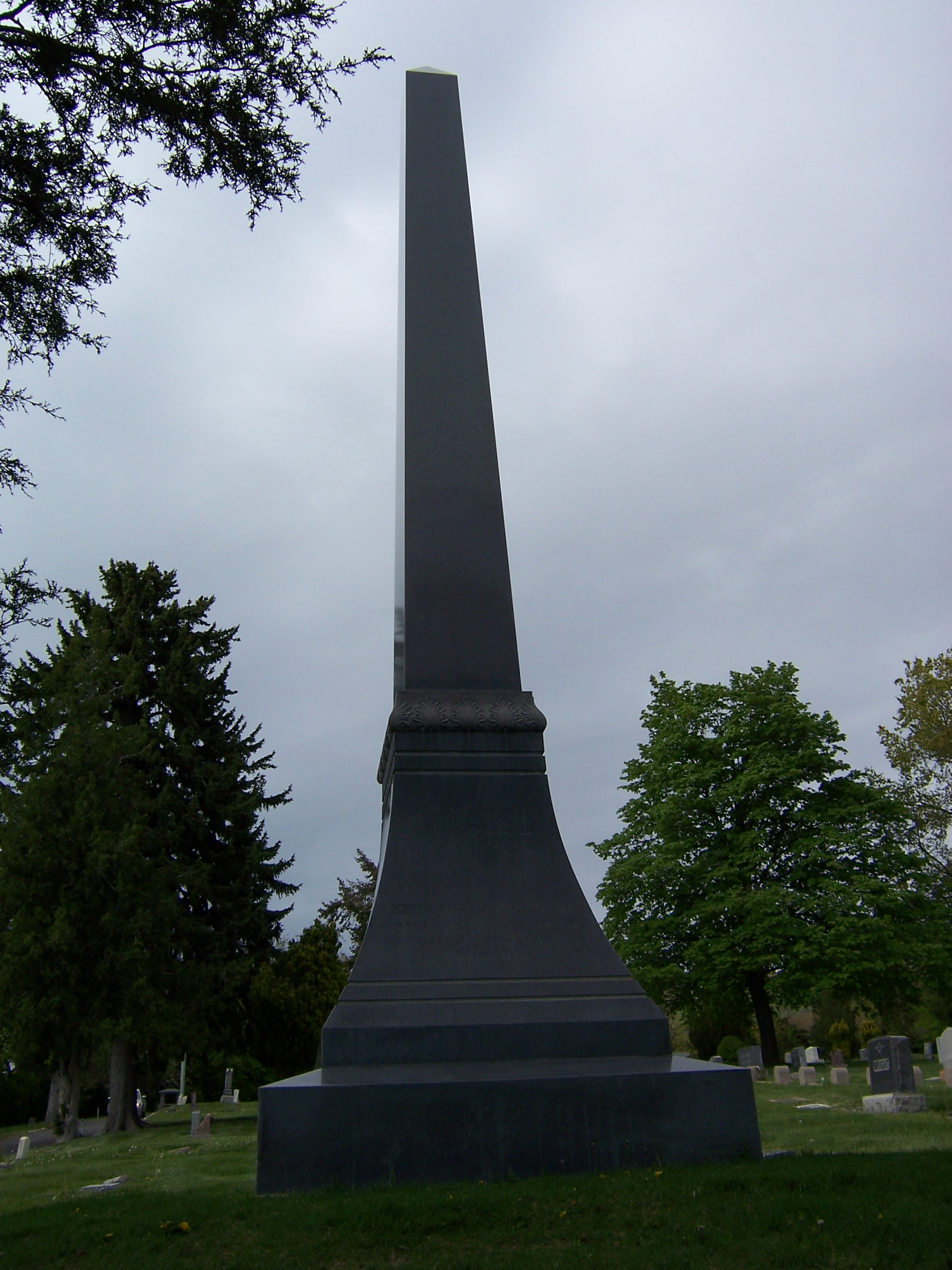

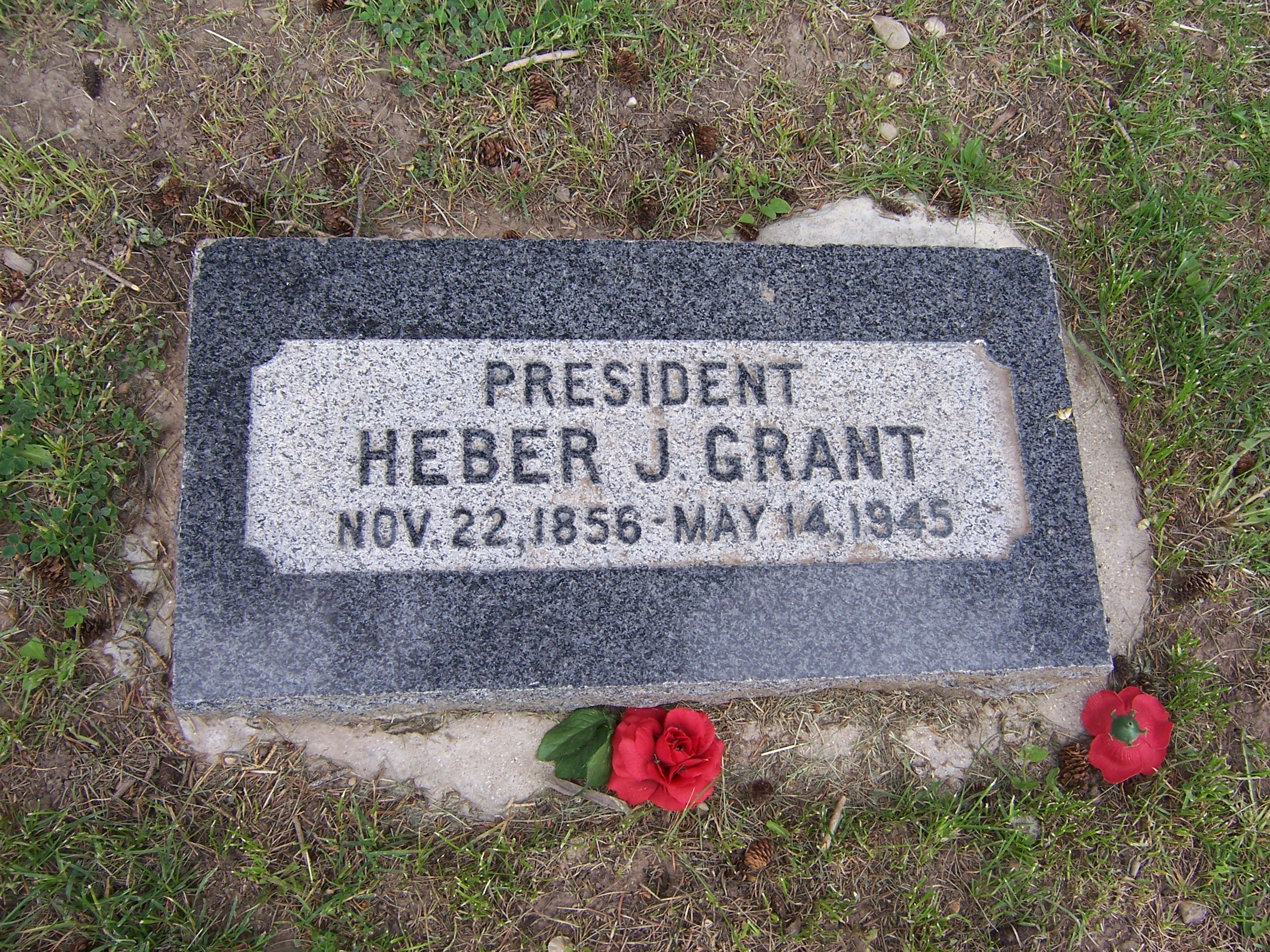

== Ancestry ==
8. Joshua Grant Jr.
4. Joshua Grant III
9. Mary Morgan
2. Jedediah Morgan Grant
10. Joseph Howard
5. Athalia Howard
11. Elizabeth Davies
1. Heber Jeddy Grant
12. Caleb Ivins
6. Caleb Wright Ivins
13. Sarah Wright
3. Rachel Ridgway Ivins
14. Barzillai Ridgeway
7. Edith Ridgeway
15. Rachel Murrell

== Works ==
- Grant, Heber J. (1941). Gospel Standards: Selections from the Sermons and Writings of Heber J. Grant. compiled by G. Homer Durham. Improvement Era. OCLC 10242816.
- —— (1970). A Japanese Journal. Compiled by Gordon A. Madsen. OCLC 16635136.
- —— (2011) [2002]. Teachings of Presidents of the Church: Heber J. Grant. Teachings of Presidents of the Church. LDS Church. OCLC 54500103.

== See also ==
- Second Manifesto

The Church of Jesus Christ of Latter-day Saints titles
Preceded by Joseph F. Smith	President of the Church; November 23, 1918 – May 14, 1945	Succeeded by George Albert Smith
Preceded by Francis M. Lyman	President of the Quorum of the Twelve Apostles; November 18, 1916 – November 23, 1918	Succeeded by Anthon H. Lund
Preceded by George Teasdale	Quorum of the Twelve Apostles; October 16, 1882 – November 23, 1918	Succeeded by John W. Taylor
