= Eduardo Balderas =

Mexican Mormon leader

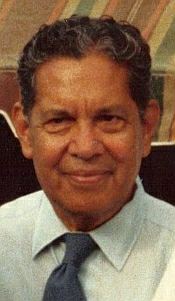
Balderas in c. 1972

Eduardo Balderas (14 September 1907 – 6 January 1989) was a Mexican translator and religious leader. He was the leading translator into Spanish of scripture and other works for the Church of Jesus Christ of Latter-day Saints (LDS Church). He served as the church's chief Spanish translator for almost 50 years. Along with Rey Pratt, Balderas was also most responsible for translating the church's hymns into Spanish. He was also involved in the first translation of the temple endowment ceremony.

== Birth and youth ==
Balderas was born in Mexico City to José Apolinar Balderas Carranco and María Centeno Guerrero. His family moved to Torreón, Mexico, when he was a young child. They later moved to El Paso, Texas. It was in El Paso in 1918 that the family joined the LDS Church.

Balderas served as an LDS Church missionary in Arizona and California from 1929 to 1931. Balderas then worked in a lumber yard in Ciudad Juárez from 1932 to 1939.

During his mission and throughout the 1930s, Balderas spent a significant amount of time doing translation work for the LDS Church's mission office in El Paso, the headquarters of the Spanish-American Mission, and accompanying mission president Harold Pratt as a translator. While serving as a missionary, Balderas had assisted Rey Pratt on a new translation of the Book of Mormon into Spanish that was never published. Pratt and Balderas also worked on translating selections from the Doctrine and Covenants, known by adherents as Latter-day revelation. Due to Rey Pratt's untimely death, his successor, Antoine R. Ivins finished translating these selections of the Doctrine and Covenants in 1934.

== Courtship and marriage ==
At about the time he was working on these translations, Balderas met a missionary named Rhea Ross. She was the daughter of Milton H. Ross, a teacher of penmanship at LDS High School in Salt Lake City. She had been born in Payson, Utah, and raised in Salt Lake City. Rhea had been a missionary in Los Angeles before being transferred to El Paso and had sought an occasion to meet Balderas, since she had heard him praised as a great teacher and speaker by members in Los Angeles. They drew close while Rhea was still serving as a missionary.

After Ross returned to Salt Lake at the end of her mission, she and Balderas continued to correspond. Despite opposition to an interracial marriage, they were married in the Mesa Arizona Temple on 10 October 1935. They then settled in El Paso, and he continued working in the lumber yard and as a part-time translator for the Mexican American Mission.

They became the parents of two girls and three boys.

== Full-time translation service ==
In 1939, Balderas was offered a job as a full-time translator for the church by Antoine R. Ivins, which he accepted, and they moved to Salt Lake City. Balderas worked under the direction of Stephen L Richards and Gordon B. Hinckley, with them giving him guidance and direction on what to translate, but the review of his translation work was done by Ivins. Balderas was the first person employed full-time by the LDS Church as a translator. Balderas remained a full-time translator until 1977, when he officially retired. He then immediately became a volunteer translator.

== Translation projects ==
Balderas completed many translation projects for the church during his career:

- A new edition of Himnos de Sión, the Spanish-language hymnbook for the church.
- The first translation of the temple endowment ceremony into a language other than English, specifically Spanish, in cooperation with Ivins.
- The complete Doctrine and Covenants, in combined efforts with Ivins.
- The Pearl of Great Price, which was completed under a church assignment, but he was the only person on the project. This was published together with the Doctrine and Covenants in 1948.
- Balderas was also involved in continuing revisions of the Spanish edition of the Book of Mormon. He created a new edition in 1949 and supervised new editions in 1969 and 1980.

In addition to this, Balderas translated several books by church leaders into Spanish, which provided access to that literature:

- A Marvelous Work and a Wonder by LeGrand Richards
- The Miracle of Forgiveness by Spencer W. Kimball
- The Articles of Faith, Jesus the Christ, and The House of the Lord by James E. Talmage
- Teachings of the Prophet Joseph Smith, Essentials in Church History, and Doctrines of Salvation by Joseph Fielding Smith
- Gospel Doctrine by Joseph F. Smith.

In 1961, Balderas helped Marion G. Romney improve his abilities in Spanish so he could more effectively function as the church's area supervisor for Mexico. Balderas was still working as a translator for the church in 1974, while also giving lessons on how to use the Liahona magazine in a church lesson.

== Other LDS Church services ==
Besides his work as a translator, Balderas also wrote articles in English for church publications about the translation process and the success of the Spanish-language sessions at the Mesa Arizona Temple. He wrote an article on translating the scriptures into Spanish that was published in the Ensign in September 1972. The previous month, Balderas had served as church president Harold B. Lee's interpreter at the church's Mexico Area Conference. Balderas also wrote "A Brief History of the Mexican Mission, 1874-1936," which was published in the Spanish Liahona in August 1956.

His ecclesiastical assignments in the church included service as a stake patriarch and as a sealer in the Salt Lake Temple. As a patriarch, he also had special authorization to give patriarchal blessings to Spanish-speaking members no matter where they lived. He also served as an officiator in the Mesa Arizona Temple, helping during excursions of Spanish-speaking Latter-day Saints. It was while in Arizona to assist with the Spanish-language temple sessions that Balderas gave most of his Spanish-language patriarchal blessings.
