= Rogers (surname) =

- Pronunciation: /ˈrɒdʒərz/

Origin
- Origin: Old English and Norman
- Region of origin: England

Other names
- Variant forms: Rodgers, Rogerson

Rogers is an English patronymic surname deriving from the given name of Roger commonly used by the Normans and meaning "son of Roger". Variants include Rodgers.

Most genealogists believe that the name Roger is derived from the pre-7th century Old English name Hrothgar, which means 'fame spear' ("hroð" fame or renown, "gari" spear), the first reference to which is in Beowulf, the Anglo-Saxon epic poem.

The surname was probably first introduced into England during the Anglo-Saxon settlement of Britain. The "Rogers" given name was probably first introduced to England after the Norman Conquest of 1066, and is first recorded as "Rogerus" in the Domesday Book of 1086. It was introduced to Ireland when the Anglo-Normans invaded in the 1170s. According to a 2020 study, those with the surname are more likely to have Viking ancestors.

The first recorded mention of the surname is in mid-13th-century England. Examples include William Rogger in the subsidy tax rolls of the county of Sussex in 1296, and Henry Rogeres in similar records for Worcestershire of 1327. The first recorded spelling of the surname is that of Richard Roger from 1263, in the "Archaeological Records" of the county of Kent during the reign of Henry III (1216–1272).

The surname is now found commonly throughout Britain, particularly in southern and western England, and also in Scotland and Wales. The surname was also taken from England to Ireland in Norman and later Cromwellian invasions. However, many occurrences of it in Ireland represent an Anglicisation of Mac Ruaidhrí and Mac Ruairí in the newer and current standard spelling.

In England and Wales it ranks as the 77th most common surname.

The surname is also popular in North America, where it was introduced during English colonisation. According to the 1990 United States Census, 'Rogers' ranked fifty-fourth in frequency among all reported surnames, accounting for 0.12% of the population. By the 2010 United States census, 'Rogers' ranked sixty-ninth among all reported surnames.

== A ==
- Aaron Rogers, Australian Rules footballer.
- A. B. Rogers, American surveyor
- Abigail Rogers (1818–1869), American advocate for women's rights and women's education
- Agnes L. Rogers (1884–1943), Scottish educator and educational psychologist
- Ambrose Rogers, Gaelic footballer
- Abbie G. Rogers, first wife of Henry Huddleston Rogers
- Adela Rogers St. Johns, American writer, daughter of Earl Rogers
- Adrian Rogers, American Baptist pastor
- Allan Rogers, multiple people
- Amerie Rogers, American singer Amerie
- Amy Keating Rogers, American screenwriter
- Andrew Rogers, British journalist
- Anthony A. C. Rogers, American politician
- Armani Rogers (born 1997), American football player
- Asa Rogers (disambiguation), multiple people
- Alex Rogers (songwriter), American composer and songwriter (1876–1930)

== B ==
- Barney Rogers, Zimbabwean cricketer
- Benjamin Rogers (disambiguation), multiple people
- Bernard Rogers, American composer
- Bernard W. Rogers, retired American general
- Benedict Rogers, British human rights activist
- B. H. Rogers, American politician
- Big Bubba Rogers, American wrestler Ray Traylor
- Bill Rogers (golfer) (born 1951), American golfer
- Bo Rogers, American football player
- Bobby Rogers, American Motown singer/songwriter, member of The Miracles
- Bogart Rogers (1897–1966), American motion picture writer and pursuit pilot
- Brandon Rogers (disambiguation), multiple people
- Brendan Rodgers (disambiguation), multiple people
- Brittany Rogers, Canadian Olympic gymnast
- Bruce Rogers (broadcaster), Canadian broadcaster
- Bruce Rogers (typographer), American typographer
- Bruce Holland Rogers, American writer
- Buck Rogers, science fiction hero appearing in a range of media
- Buddy Rogers (disambiguation), multiple people
- Byron Rogers (author), Welsh essayist and biographer

== C ==
- Caitrin Rogers, American documentary film producer
- Caleb Rogers (born 2001), American football player
- Carl Rogers (1902–1987), American psychologist
- Carlos Rogers (disambiguation), multiple people
- Casey Rogers (born 1998), American football player
- Cathy Rogers (born 1968), English television producer
- Chandler Rogers (born 2001), American football player
- Charles Rogers (disambiguation), multiple people
- Chris Rogers (disambiguation), multiple people
- Christabella Rogers, English poet
- Claude Ambrose Rogers (1920–2005), English mathematician
- Claudette Rogers Robinson (born 1942), American singer-songwriter
- Clay Rogers (born 1980), American stock car racing driver
- C. L. B. Rogers (1928–1996), Belizean politician
- Clement V. Rogers (1839–1911), American judge
- Clifford Joy Rogers (1897–1962), American politician
- Collin Rogers (1791–1845), American architect
- Corky Rogers (1943–2020), American football coach
- Craig G. Rogers (born 1971), American urologist
- Cullen Rogers (1921–1997), American football player

== D ==
- D. J. Rogers (1948–2020), stage name of DeWayne Julius Rogers, American singer-songwriter, record producer, and musician
- Dale Evans Rogers, American singer-songwriter, wife of Roy Rogers
- Dalton Rogers (born 2001), American baseball player
- Daniel Rogers, (1573–1652), English Puritan clergyman and religious writer
- Daniel Rogers, (1754–1806), early American politician and miller from Delaware
- Daniel Rogers, (c. 1538–1591), Anglo-Flemish diplomat
- Danny Rogers (born 1994), Irish football goalkeeper
- Darryl Rogers, American football coach
- David Rogers (disambiguation), multiple people
- Dayton Leroy Rogers (born 1953), American serial killer
- Denis Rogers, former mayor of Hamilton, New Zealand
- Desiree Rogers, former White House social secretary
- Don Rogers (disambiguation), multiple people
- Doug Rogers (disambiguation), multiple people

== E ==
- E. D. Rogers, American businessman and politician
- Earl Rogers, American trial lawyer
- Eamonn Rogers, Irish footballer
- Edith Rogers (Manitoba politician), Canadian politician
- Edith Nourse Rogers, American politician
- Edward S. Rogers, Sr., Canadian businessman
- Edward Samuel Rogers ("Ted" Rogers), Canadian businessman
- Edward Rogers III, president of Rogers Cable, son of Ted Rogers and grandson of Edward S. Rogers, Sr.
- Edwina Rogers, public policy consultant, former executive director at the Secular Coalition for America
- Effie Hoffman Rogers, American educator
- Elgin Rogers Jr., American politician
- Elizabeth Rogers, American actress
- Ellen Rogers, British photographer
- Emma Winner Rogers, American writer, speaker, suffragist
- Erik Rogers, American singer
- Ernesto Nathan Rogers, Italian architect
- Ethel Tench Rogers, American composer
- Evan Rogers, Chiropractor
- Everett Rogers, American scholar of innovation

== F ==
- Fred Rogers, host of the American children's show Mister Rogers' Neighborhood on public television
- Fred Rogers (football coach), Drake University football coach for the 1896 season
- Frederic Rogers, 1st Baron Blachford, British civil servant
- Frederick Arundel Rogers (1876–1944), British archdeacon and plant collector

== G ==
- Gabe Rogers (born 1990), American basketball player
- Gabriel Rogers (born 2001), British footballer
- George Rogers (disambiguation), multiple people
- Ginger Rogers (1911–1995), American actress and dancer
- Glen Edward Rogers (1962–2025), American executed serial killer
- Grace Rainey Rogers (1867–1943), American art collector, philanthropist
- Greg Rogers (born 1948), Australian swimmer
- Gretchen Woodman Rogers (1881–1967), American painter

== H ==
- Hal Rogers, American politician
- Harold A. Rogers, the founder of Kin Canada
- Harry Rogers (cricketer), English cricketer
- Hartley Rogers, Jr., American mathematician
- Henk Rogers, Tetris entrepreneur
- Henry Darwin Rogers, American geologist
- Henry Huttleston Rogers, American businessman
- Henry Martyn Rogers (1879–1926), English missionary on Tristan da Cunha

== I ==
- Ian Rogers (disambiguation), multiple people
- Isaiah Rogers, American architect
- Ivan Rogers, British civil servant

== J ==
- Jacob Rogers (born 1981), American football player
- Jacob S. Rogers (died 1901), American locomotive manufacturer
- Jake Rogers (disambiguation), multiple people
- James Rogers (disambiguation), multiple people
- Jane Rogers (disambiguation), multiple people
- Jean Rogers (1916–1991), American actress
- Jennifer Rogers, British statistician
- Jeffrey Rogers, British fashion designer and retailer
- Jeremy Rogers, (Born 1974) Electrical Engineer
- Jessie Rogers (born 1993), Brazilian-American pornographic actress
- Jim Rogers (born 1942), American money manager
- Jim Rogers, American entrepreneur and former attorney
- Jim Rogers, American businessman
- Jimmy Rogers (1924–1997), American musician
- Jimmy Rogers (American football player) (born 1955), American football player
- Jimmy Rogers (American football coach) (born 1988/1989), American football coach
- Joel Rogers, American law professor
- Joel Augustus Rogers, Jamaican historian
- Joel Townsley Rogers, American writer
- Jodie Rogers (born 1970), Australian diver
- John Rogers (disambiguation), multiple people
- Josh Rogers (born 1994), American baseball player
- Judith Ann Wilson Rogers (born 1939), American judge
- Julian Rogers (born 1947), Caribbean broadcaster and journalist
- Julia Ellen Rogers (1866–1958), American author of natural science and educator
- Justin Rogers (disambiguation), multiple people

== K ==
- Kasey Rogers, American actress
- Kate Rogers, Canadian musician
- Keith Rogers, Canadian broadcaster
- Kelis Rogers (born 1980), American singer and songwriter
- Kendrick Rogers (born 1997), American football player
- Kenneth C. Rogers (born 1929), American physicist, academic administrator, and government official
- Kenny Rogers (1938–2020), American singer, songwriter and actor
- Kenny Rogers (baseball), American baseball player
- Kent Rogers (1923–1944), American voice actor
- Kevin Rogers (disambiguation), multiple people
- Kimberly Rogers (c. 1961–2001), Canadian fraudster
- Kristian Rogers, English footballer
- Kristina Curry Rogers, American paleontologist
- Kylie Rogers (born 2004), American actor

== L ==
- Lane Rogers (1994–2025), American pornographic actor
- Laura Rogers, British actress
- Lee Rogers (disambiguation), multiple people
- Leonard Rogers, British physician
- Leonard James Rogers, British mathematician
- Les Rogers (disambiguation), multiple people
- Lillian Rogers Parks, American writer, daughter of Margaret Parks
- Linda Rogers (poet), Canadian poet
- Lisa Rogers, British television presenter
- Louis W. Rogers, labor unionist
- Lucy Rogers, British science writer
- Lucy Rogers (politician)
- Lynn Rogers (biologist), biologist
- Lynn Rogers (politician), American businessman

== M ==
- Marc Rogers, Canadian bassist
- Margaret Rogers (disambiguation), multiple people
- Mark E. Rogers (1952–2014), American writer
- Marshall Rogers, comic book artist
- Martha E. Rogers, American nurse, researcher, theorist, and author
- Mary Rogers – American crime victim
- Mary (Mai) Huttleston Rogers Coe, daughter of Henry Huddleston Rogers
- Mat Rogers, Australian rugby league player
- Matthew Rogers, American singer
- Maurice Albert Windham Rogers, British soldier
- Melody Rogers, American actress, known for Saved by the Bell as Mrs. Melanie Morris
- Michael Rogers (disambiguation), multiple people
- Michael J. Rogers, name used by American film director Ray Dennis Steckler
- Michele Rogers, American model
- Mick Rogers (disambiguation), multiple people
- Mimi Rogers, American actress
- Morgan Rogers, English footballer

== N ==
- Nancy H. Rogers, American lawyer and politician
- Natalie Rogers, psychologist
- Nathaniel Rogers (disambiguation), multiple people
- Neil Rogers, American journalist
- Neil Rogers (swimmer)
- Neomia Rogers (1940–2025), American high jumper
- Nicola Rogers, British archaeologist
- Nigel Rogers (1935–2022), British singer
- Noah Rogers (born 2005), American football player
- Noel Rogers, Australian cricketer
- Norm Rogers (disambiguation), multiple people
- Norman Rogers (disambiguation)

== P ==
- Pamela Rogers Turner, American sex offender
- Patricia Helen Rogers, Canadian politician
- Patrick J. Rogers, Irish-American lawyer and politician
- Patsy Rogers, American composer
- Paul Rogers (actor), British actor
- Paul Rogers (basketball), Australian basketball player
- Paul Rogers (politician), American politician
- Peter Rogers, British film director

== R ==
- Ralph B. Rogers, American businessman
- Randolph Rogers, American artist
- Rex M. Rogers, American writer
- Richard Rogers (disambiguation), multiple people
- Rip Rogers, American wrestler
- Robbie Rogers, American soccer player
- Robert Rogers (disambiguation), multiple people
- Rodney Rogers (1971–2025), American basketball player
- Rodney J. Rogers (1965–2024), American entrepreneur and expert technologist
- Roy Rogers, American cowboy actor
- Russell L. Rogers, American astronaut
- Ruth Rogers, American-born British chef

== S ==
- S. E. Rogers, Canadian politician
- Sally Rogers, British actress
- Sam Rogers (fullback), American football player
- Samuel Rogers, British poet
- Samuel Baldwyn Rogers, British metallurgical chemist, printer and pamphleteer
- Samuel Shepard Rogers (1943–2017), American actor known as Sam Shepard
- Scott Rogers, American public service officer and musician
- Shaggy Rogers, fictional character from Scooby-Doo
- Sharon Elery Rogers, American composer
- Sharon Rogers, American model
- Shaun Rogers (American football)
- Shelagh Rogers, Canadian broadcaster
- Shelby Rogers, American tennis player
- Sherman S. Rogers, New York politician
- Shorty Rogers, American jazz musician
- Sion Hart Rogers, American politician
- SirVincent Rogers, American football player
- Stan Rogers, Canadian folk singer
- Stanley Rogers, American politician
- Stanley R. H. Rogers, American author
- Stephen Rogers, Canadian politician
- Stephen Walter Rogers, American preacher, activist, writer, and editorialist
- Steve Rogers (disambiguation), multiple people
- Su Rogers, British architect
- Suzanne Rogers, American actress

== T ==
- Taylor Rogers, American baseball player
- Ted Rogers (comedian), British comedian
- T. Gary Rogers (1942–2017), American businessman
- Thomas Rogers (disambiguation), multiple people
- Thorold Rogers, English economist, historian and Member of Parliament
- Tim Rogers (disambiguation), multiple people
- Todd Rogers, American beach volleyball player
- Tom Rogers (baseball), American baseball player
- Tommy Rogers, American wrestler
- Tommy Giles Rogers, Jr., musician
- Tony Rogers (disambiguation), multiple people
- Trevor Rogers (disambiguation), multiple people
- Tristan Rogers, Australian-American actor
- Tyler Rogers, American baseball player
- Tyler Rogers (gridiron football), American football player

== V ==
- Volney Rogers (1846–1919), American lawyer

== W ==
- Warren Rogers (1922–2003), American journalist
- Wayne Rogers (1933–2015), American actor
- Will Rogers (1879–1935), American humorist and entertainer
- Will Rogers Jr. (1911–1993), American politician, son of Will Rogers
- William Rogers (disambiguation), multiple people
- Woodes Rogers (1679–1732), British privateer

== See also ==
- Rodgers
