= Rodgers =

- Pronunciation: /ˈrɒdʒərz/

Origin
- Origin: English and Norman
- Region of origin: England

Other names
- Variant forms: Rogers, Rogerson, Roger, Rodger, Rodgerson

Rodgers is a patronymic surname deriving from the given name of "Rodger" commonly used by the Normans and meaning "son of Rodger". Variant form of Rogers.

The name Rodger is of Old German origin and is likely derived from the Germanic name Hrodger meaning "famous spear", composed of the elements hruod "fame" and ger "spear".

In England, the name Rodger could’ve derived from the pre-7th century Old English name Hrothgar, which means 'fame spear' ("hroð" fame or renown, "gari" spear), the first reference to which is in Beowulf, the Anglo-Saxon epic poem. The name was probably first introduced into England during the Anglo-Saxon settlement of Britain.

However, it is more likely that the name Rodger was introduced to England after the Norman Conquest of 1066. In Normandy, the name "Rodger" was reinforced by the Old Norse cognate Hróðgeirr and was very popular with the Norsemen. It was they who "borrowed" it from the Gauls they conquered, as they swept through on their long march from Scandinavia to their home in Normandy. According to a 2020 study, those with the surname are more likely to have Viking ancestors.

The Normans brought the name to England, where it replaced the name "Hroðgar" (Old Norse: Hróarr). The name of a legendary Danish king, living in the early 6th century mentioned in Beowulf, Widsith, and also in Norse sagas.

From the Old Norse, Hroð-geirr; from the Danish, Roedeger, Rodgers; from the Flemish, Roger; from the French, Rogier; from the German, Roger; from the Latin, Rodegerus, Rodeghiero; in the Domesday Book, Roger.

It was introduced to Ireland when the Anglo-Normans invaded in the 1170s and then later in the Cromwellian invasions. However, many occurrences of it in Ireland represent an Anglicisation of Mac Ruaidhrí and Mac Ruairí in the newer and current standard spelling.

The surname Rodgers was first found in the Hundredorum Rolls of 1273 as Adam filius Rogeri in Lincolnshire; and Robert filius Rogeri in Norfolk. Kirby's Quest of Somerset listed Waltero Rogero in Somerset, 1 Edward III (during the first year of Edward III's reign.) Over 100 years later, the name had evolved from the early Latin versions that held either the vowel "i" or "o" to the more recent spellings we understand today. The Yorkshire Poll Tax Rolls of 1379 listed Willelmus Rogerson and as a personal name Rogerus Smyth.

The name was "rare or absent in England north of a line drawn from the River Humber to the River Mersey. Scattered over the rest of England and also Wales, but generally infrequent in the eastern counties, being by far the most numerous in the western half of its area. It is most common in Herefordshire and Shropshire, and also in Cornwall." This author continues "Rodger is the Scotch form, it has no definite distribution. In England we only find it occasionally, as in the case of Rodgers in Derbyshire."

From this vantage, we explored the aforementioned "Scotch" (Scottish) origin further. In this case, many of the records were recorded in the Anglo-Saxon or English version rather than the previous entries that had the Latin form. "Roger was appointed abbot of Dryburgh in 1152. Roger, son of Oggou, attested a deed of middle of thirteenth century. William Roger was tenant of the abbot of Coupar-Angus in 1468." Black continues "Rodgers is the more common form with Scots. Rogers, in some parts of central Scotland, is pronounced Rodgie, and some Gaelic-speaking people in Perthshire pronounce it Rougie and sometimes Royger. John Rodgers, born in Maryland, 1771, son of a Scots colonel of militia, fired with his own hand the first shot in the war with Great Britain in 1812."

"The family of Rogers of Home, in Shropshire, are a cadet of the Norburys of Norbury in that county. In 7. Edward II., (seventh year of Edward II's reign) Roger de Norbury, son of Philip, and grandson of Roger de Norbury, had a grant of the estate of Home. His son took the name of Rogers, and his posterity under that appellation have ever since resided at Home."

Roger of Salisbury (died 1139), "also called Roger the Great, bishop of Salisbury and justiciar, was of humble origin, and originally priest of a little chapel near Caen. The future king, Henry I, chanced, while riding out from Caen, to turn aside to this chapel to hear mass. Roger, guessing the temper of his audience, went through the service with such speed that they declared him the very man for a soldier's chaplain, and Henry took him into his service."

== Surname ==
- Aaron Rodgers (born 1983), American football player
- Alan Rodgers (1959–2014), American science fiction and horror writer, editor, and poet
- Amari Rodgers (born 1999), American football player
- Amy Rodgers (born 2000), English professional footballer
- Andre Rodgers (1934–2004), American professional baseball player
- Andrew Rodgers (1827–1922), American colonel and politician
- Andrew Denny Rodgers, III (1900–1981), American lawyer and botanist
- Andy Rodgers (born 1983), Scottish footballer
- Andy Rodgers (musician) (1922–2004), American Delta blues harmonicist, guitarist, singer and songwriter
- Anton Rodgers (1933–2007), British actor and director
- Bertram J. Rodgers (1894–1983), American vice admiral
- Bill Rodgers, several people
- Brendan Rodgers, multiple people
- Buck Rodgers (born 1938), American baseball player and manager
- Calbraith Perry Rodgers (1879–1912), American aviation pioneer
- Carolyn Rodgers (born 1940), American writer
- Cathy McMorris Rodgers (born 1969), American politician
- Chris Rodgers (born 1976), English professional golfer
- Christopher Raymond Perry Rodgers (1819–1892), American admiral
- Clodagh Rodgers (1947–2025), Northern Ireland singer and actress
- Daniel Rodgers (born 1994), Vogue editor
- Daniel T. Rodgers (born 1942), American historian and emeritus
- Dave Rodgers (Giancarlo Pasquini, born 1963), Italian songwriter, composer, and producer
- David H. Rodgers (1923–2017), American politician
- Del Rodgers (born 1960), American professional football player
- Denny Rodgers (born 1968), Canadian politician
- Derrick Rodgers (born 1971), American professional football player
- Eileen Rodgers (1930–2003), American singer and Broadway performer
- Eleazar Rodgers (born 1985), South African footballer
- Emily Rodgers (born 1980), American singer-songwriter and multi-instrumentalist
- Francis Silas Rodgers (1841–1911), American cotton merchant of Charleston, South Carolina
- Francois Rodgers (born 1961), South African politician
- Frank E. Rodgers (1909–2000), American politician
- Frederick Rodgers (1842–1917), American admiral
- Gaby Rodgers (born 1928), German-born American actress, theater director, and journalist
- Gage Rodgers (born 2003), American professional stock car racing driver
- George Rodgers, several people
- Guy Rodgers (1935–2001), American professional basketball player
- Harvey Rodgers (born 1996), English professional footballer
- Ilona Rodgers (born 1942), British actress and television presenter
- Ira Rodgers (1895–1963), American football, basketball, baseball, and golf player and coach
- Isaiah Rodgers (born 1997), American football player
- Jacquizz Rodgers (born 1990), of the Atlanta Falcons
- Jake Rodgers (born 1991), American professional football player
- James O. Rodgers (1874–1945), American football player and coach
- James W. Rodgers (1910–1960), American criminal executed by firing squad in Utah
- Jameson Rodgers (born 1987), American country music singer and songwriter
- Jennifer Rodgers (born 1970/1971), American attorney and legal analyst
- Jimmie Rodgers (country singer) (1897–1933), American country singer
- Jimmie Rodgers (pop singer) (1933–2021), American pop singer
- Jimmy Rodgers (basketball) (born 1943), American basketball coach
- John Rodgers, several people
- John S. Rodgers (born 1965), American politician
- Johnny Rodgers (born 1951), American football player
- Jordan Rodgers (born 1988), American football player; brother of Aaron
- Joseph Lee Rodgers (born 1953), American psychologist
- Judy Rodgers (1956–2013), American chef, restaurateur, and cookery book writer
- Kemi Rodgers (born 1994), English presenter
- Kevin Rodgers, several people
- Kordell Rodgers (born 1998), American professional football player
- Lorraine Rodgers (1921–2018), American pilot, first American woman to fly in World War II
- Luke Rodgers (born 1982), English footballer (soccer player)
- Marion Rodgers (1921–2017), American military pilot, Tuskegee Airmen
- Marion Elizabeth Rodgers, American author and scholar
- Mary Rodgers (1931–2014), American composer and author of children's books, daughter of Richard Rodgers
- Matt Rodgers (born 1969), American professional football player
- Michael Rodgers, several people
- Mighty Mo Rodgers (born 1942), American blues musician and record producer
- Mike Rodgers (born 1985), American professional track and field sprinter
- Moses Rodgers (c. 1835–1900), American mining engineer
- Nguyễn Rodgers (born 1981), Kenyan footballer
- Nigel Rodgers (born 1952), British writer and campaigner
- Nile Rodgers (born 1952), American bassist and producer
- Norman Rodgers (1927–2023), American politician
- Norman Rodgers (footballer) (1891–1947), English footballer
- Patrick Rodgers (born 1992), American professional golfer
- Patsy Rodgers, English Calgary Stampede queen
- Patsy Dan Rodgers (1944–2018), Irish painter, musician, and the King of Tory
- Paul Rodgers (born 1949), British singer-songwriter
- Pepper Rodgers (1931–2020), American football player and coach
- Philip Rodgers (1891–1966), English professional golfer
- Raymond P. Rodgers (1849–1925), American admiral
- Rebecca Rodgers (born 2000), American curler
- Richard Rodgers (1902–1979), American composer
- Richard Rodgers II (born 1992), American football tight end
- Richard Rodgers Sr. (born 1961), American football coach and former player
- Samuel Rodgers (1894–1970), Irish politician
- Samuel R. Rodgers (1798–1866), American attorney, judge and politician
- Silvia Rodgers (1928–2006), German-British writer and political activist
- Sondra Rodgers (1903–1997), American actress
- Sonny Rodgers (1939–1990), American blues guitarist, singer and songwriter
- Sugar Rodgers (born 1989), American basketball player
- Terry Rodgers (born 1947), American artist
- Thomas S. Rodgers (1858–1931), United States Navy admiral
- Thurman D. Rodgers (1934–2022), American army lieutenant general
- Travis Rodgers, American sports talk radio personality
- Violet Rodgers (1914–1978), British museum curator
- Will Rodgers (born 1994), American professional stock car racing driver
- William Rodgers, several people
- T. J. Rodgers (born 1948), American businessman
- Thelma Rodgers, Antarctic scientist from New Zealand
- Thomas Malin Rodgers (1943–2012), puzzle collector and founder of Gathering 4 Gardner
- W. R. Rodgers (1909–1969), known as "Bertie" Rogers, Northern Ireland poet
- William Ledyard Rodgers (1860–1944), American admiral
- Woodall Rodgers (1890–1961), American attorney, businessman, and mayor of Dallas

== Given name ==
- Rodgers Grant (1935–2012), American jazz pianist, composer, and lyricist
- Rodgers Kola (born 1989), Zambian footballer
- Rodgers Rop (born 1976), long-distance runner from Kenya

== See also ==
- Rodgers House (disambiguation)
- Rodgers Instruments, organ builder (Rodgers Organs, digital and pipe combination organs)
- Rodgers Stores, defunct chain of stores in Portland, Oregon
- Rural Municipality of Rodgers No. 133, Saskatchewan, Canada
- Rodgers Peak
- Rodger, a surname
- Rogers (surname)
- Rogers (disambiguation)
