= David Rogers =

David or Dave Rogers may refer to:

== Arts and entertainment ==
- David Rogers (country singer) (1936–1993), American country music singer
- D.V. Rogers (born 1968), New Zealand performance installation artist
- David Clayton Rogers (born 1977), American film producer, writer and actor
- David Rogers (film editor) (fl. 1996–present), American television editor, director and producer
- David Rogers (Hawaiian musician) (1935–1983), Hawaiian steel guitar player

== Politics and law ==
- David McGregor Rogers (1772–1824), Canadian farmer and political figure in Upper Canada
- David Rogers (Canadian politician) (1829–1909), Canadian merchant, shipbuilder and politician in Prince Edward Island
- David Dickson Rogers (1845–1915), Canadian politician
- David Rogers (North Carolina politician) (born 1965), American politician in the North Carolina House of Representatives
- Dave Rogers (Massachusetts politician) (fl. 2019–present), American politician in the Massachusetts House of Representatives

== Sports ==
- David Rogers (footballer) (1892–?), English football (soccer) player
- Dave Rogers (Australian footballer) (1942–2000), Australian footballer for Carlton Football Club
- David Rogers (racing driver) (1955–2020), American racing driver
- Dave Rogers (crew chief) (born 1974), American auto racing crew chief
- Dave Rogers (footballer, born 1975), English footballer

== Others ==
- David Rogers (librarian) (1917–1995), British bibliographer
- David Rogers (priest) (1921–2020), British Anglican priest
- David Rogers (meteorologist) (born 1957), British atmospheric scientist

== See also ==
- David Rodgers (disambiguation)
- David Roger (born 1961), American attorney
- Rogers (surname)
