= Richard Rodgers (disambiguation) =

Richard Rodgers (1902–1979) was an American composer.

Richard Rodgers may also refer to:

- Richard Rodgers (tight end) (born 1992), American football tight end
- Richard Rodgers Sr. (born 1961), American football coach and player
- Richard Rodgers, founder of the UK Christian political party The Common Good

== Fictional characters ==
- Richard Alexander Rodgers or Richard Castle, fictional character on the television crime series Castle

== See also ==
- Richard Rodgers Theatre, New York City
- Richard Rodgers Award (disambiguation)
- Richard Rodgers School (disambiguation)
- Richard Rogers (disambiguation)
