= James Rogers =

James, Jim, Jimmy, or Jimmie Rogers (or Rodgers) may refer to:

== Academics ==
- James Blythe Rogers (1802–1852), American chemist
- James Edwin Thorold Rogers (1823–1890), English economist, historian and Liberal politician
- Leonard James Rogers (1862–1933), British mathematician
- James Harvey Rogers (1886–1939), American professor of economics
- James Stanley Rogers (1893–1977), Australian physicist

== Businessmen ==
- James Woodall Rodgers (1890–1961), American attorney, businessman and mayor of Dallas
- James E. Rogers (attorney) (1938–2014), American entrepreneur and attorney
- Jim Rogers (born 1942), American investor, co-founder of the Quantum Fund
- James E. Rogers Jr. (1947–2018), American businessman and author
- James D. Rogers (born 1949), president and CEO of Kampgrounds of America

== Military ==
- James Rogers (British Army officer) (1726–1790), colonial American soldier and Loyalist
- James Rogers (Australian soldier) (1875–1961), Australian soldier who received the Victoria Cross

== Music ==
- Jimmie Rodgers (1897–1933), American country singer-songwriter known as the "Singing Brakeman"
- Jimmy Rogers (1924–1997), American blues guitarist
  - Jimmy Rogers (album), 1990
- Jimmie Rodgers (pop singer) (1933–2021), American pop singer who sang "Honeycomb"
- James Hotchkiss Rogers (1857–1940), American organist, composer, teacher, music critic, and publisher
- James Gamble Rogers IV (1937–1991), American folk musician

== Politics ==
- James Rogers (congressman) (1795–1873), U.S. representative from South Carolina
- James C. Rogers (1838–1907), American general, lawyer and politician
- James T. Rogers (1864–1929), New York politician
- James Grafton Rogers (1883–1971), American assistant secretary of state
- James Woodall Rodgers (1890–1961), American attorney, businessman and mayor of Dallas
- Jim Rodgers (politician) (born 1943), former lord mayor of Belfast, Northern Ireland
- Jim Rogers (California politician) (born 1955), city councilman and "the Peoples' Lawyer" in Richmond, California
- Jimmie Rodgers (doctor) (active in 21st century), Solomon Islander Secretary to Prime Minister - Special Duties

== Religion ==
- James Guinness Rogers (1822–1911), British Nonconformist clergyman
- James Rogers (bishop) (1826–1902), Canadian Roman Catholic bishop

== Sports ==
=== American football ===
- James O. Rodgers (American football) (1874–1945), American football player and coach
- Jimmy Rogers (American football player) (born 1955), American NFL football running back with the New Orleans Saints
- James Rogers (American football) (born 1988), American NFL football cornerback with the Tampa Bay Buccaneers and Kansas City Chiefs
- James Rodgers (gridiron football) (born 1988), American NFL football wide receiver with the Atlanta Falcons
- Jimmy Rogers (American football coach) (born 1988/1989), American football coach

=== Other sports ===
- Jim Rogers (baseball) (1872–1900), American baseball player
- Jimmy Rodgers (footballer) (1897–1973), Australian rules footballer
- Jimmy Rogers (footballer) (1929–1996), English footballer
- Jimmy Rogers (basketball, born 1939) (1939–2018), British basketball coach and player
- Jimmy Rodgers (basketball) (born 1943), American basketball coach and executive
- James Rogers (handballer) (born 1946), American Olympic handball player
- Jimmy Rogers (swimmer) (born 1949), English swimmer
- Jimmy Rogers (basketball, born c. 1950), American basketball player
- James Rogers (cricketer) (born 1958), English cricketer
- Jimmy Rogers (baseball) (born 1967), American baseball player

== Other ==
- James Edward Rogers (1838–1896), Irish architect and artist
- James E. Rogers Energy Complex, coal plant in Mooresboro, North Carolina
- James Rodgers (consul) (1861–1930), United States Consul-General to Shanghai, Havana and Montreal
- James Gamble Rogers (1867–1947), American architect
- James Gamble Rogers II (1901–1990), American architect
- James W. Rodgers (1910–1960), American criminal executed by firing squad in Utah
- James O. Rodgers (author), American writer and proponent of diverse workplaces
- J. B. Rogers (active since 1999), American film director and producer
- James Rogers, the son of Captain America and Black Widow from Marvel Animation's Next Avengers (2008)
