= Rodger =

Rodger is given masculine name and surname.

== First name ==
- Rodger Arneil, Scottish rugby union player
- Rodger Bain, British former record producer
- Rodger Bumpass, American voice actor and actor
- Rodger Corser, Australian actor
- Rodger Dean Duncan, American author and business consultant
- Rodger Krouse (born 1961), American businessperson
- Rodger McFarlane, American gay rights activist
- Rodger O. Riney, American CEO, president and founder of Scottrade Inc.
- Rodger Saffold, American football player (NFL)
- Rodger Smith, Canadian ice hockey player
- Rodger Wilton Young (1918–1943), American U.S. Army soldier during World War II, recipient of the Medal of Honor

== Surname ==
- Alan Rodger, Baron Rodger of Earlsferry (1944–2011), Scottish judge
- George Rodger (1908–1995), British photojournalist
  - Peter Rodger, British-American filmmaker, son of George
  - Elliot Rodger (1991–2014), grandson of George, British-born American spree killer
- Jim Rodger (1933–2024), Scottish footballer
- N. A. M. Rodger, British naval historian
- Patrick Campbell Rodger (1920–2002), British Anglican ecumenist
- Tom Rodger, Scottish footballer

== See also ==
- All pages beginning with Rodger
- Rodgers, a surname and given name
- Roger, a surname and given name
