= Jean Barrett =

Jean Barrett may refer to:

- Jean Barrett (American football) (born 1951), former American football offensive lineman
- Jean Barrett (novelist), pseudonym of the American romantic novelist Robert "Bob" Rogers
