= Charles Rogers =

Charles Rogers may refer to:

== Arts and entertainment ==
- Charles Rogers (collector) (1711–1784), English customs official, known as an art collector
- Charles Rogers (director) (born 1987), American film director and screenwriter
- Charles "Buddy" Rogers (1904–1999), American actor and jazz musician
- Charles R. Rogers (1892–1957), American film producer
- Charley Rogers (1887–1956), British actor, film director and screenwriter who was sometimes credited as Charles Rogers
- Charlie Rogers (painter) (1930–2020), English self-taught artist

== Sports ==
- Charlie Rogers (American football) (born 1976), American football running back and wide receiver in the National Football League
- Charles Rogers (American football coach) (1902–1986), American football coach
- Charles Rogers (cricketer) (1823–1887), English cricketer
- Charles Rogers (sailor) (born 1937), American Olympic sailor
- Charles Rogers (wide receiver) (1981–2019), American football wide receiver
- Charles Rogers (decathlete), American decathlete, 2nd at the 1924 USA Outdoor Track and Field Championships
- Charles Rogers (triple jumper) (born 1971), American triple jumper, 1992 and 1993 All-American for the UCLA Bruins track and field team

== Other ==
- Charles Rogers (author) (1825–1890), Scottish minister and historical writer
- Charles Rogers (murder suspect) (1921–1975), American pilot, geologist, murder suspect
- Charles Rogers (New York politician) (1800–1874), U.S. Representative from New York
- Charles Calvin Rogers (1929–1990), United States Army officer and Medal of Honor recipient
- Charles Cassius Rogers (1849–1937), Wisconsin State Senator
- Charles Coltman-Rogers (born Charles Coltman Rogers; 1854–1929), British agriculturalist and politician
- Charles P. Rogers (1829–1917), American furniture industrialist and banker from New York City
