= Leslie Rogers =

Leslie or Lesley Rogers may refer to:

- Leslie Rogers (footballer) (1896–1916)
- Lesley Rogers, figure skater in 1997 World Figure Skating Championships
- Leslie Rogers (curler) in 2006–07 curling season
- Leslie Rogers Jr (died 2009), Belizean shooting victim

== See also ==
- Les Rogers (disambiguation)
