= Stanley Rogers (disambiguation) =

Stanley Rogers (born 1939) is an American lawyer and politician from Tennessee.

Stanley Rogers may refer to:

- Stanley R. H. Rogers (1887–1961), American maritime author and illustrator
- Stan Rogers (1949–1983), Canadian folk singer
- Stan Rogers (American football) (born 1952), American football player

== See also ==
- Stan Rodger (1940–2022), New Zealand politician
