= David Rodgers (disambiguation) =

David Rodgers (born 1952) is an English footballer.

David Rodgers or Dave Rodgers may also refer to:

- David H. Rodgers (1923–2017), mayor of Spokane, Washington
- Dave Rodgers (born 1963), Italian musician

== See also ==
- David Rogers (disambiguation)
- Dave Rodger (born 1955), New Zealand rower
- David J. Rodger (1970–2015), British author and game designer
