= David Rodger =

David Rodger may refer to:

- Dave Rodger (born 1955), New Zealand rower
- David J. Rodger (1970–2015), British author and game designer
