= Robert Rogers =

Robert Rogers may refer to:

== Politics ==
- Robert Rogers (Irish politician) (died 1719), Irish politician, MP for Cork City 1692–1699
- Robert Rogers (Manitoba politician) (1864–1936), Canadian politician
- Robert Rogers, Baron Lisvane (born 1950), Chief Executive and Clerk of the House of Commons of the United Kingdom
- Robert Gordon Rogers (1919–2010), Canadian Lieutenant Governor of British Columbia
- Robert Louis Rogers, former Canadian ambassador to Israel

== Other ==
- Robert Rogers (British Army officer) (1731–1795), American colonial officer, explorer, and playwright; commanded Rogers' Rangers
- Robert Empie Rogers (1813–1884), American chemist
- Robert Montresor Rogers (1834–1895), Irish recipient of the Victoria Cross
- Robert Rogers (novelist), American writer under the pen names of Lee Rogers, Jean Barrett, and Jean Thomas
- Sir Robert Hargreaves Rogers (1850–1924), Sheriff of the City of London
- Robert Athlyi Rogers (1891–1931), author of the Holy Piby, an important foundational text in Rastafarian theology
- Robert Rogers (priest) (–1595), Anglican priest and antiquary
- Bobby Rogers (1940–2013), American Motown singer, songwriter, member of The Miracles

== See also ==
- Robert L. Rodgers (1875–1960), U.S. Representative from Pennsylvania
- Bob Rogers (disambiguation)
- Rogers (surname)
