= Ridgers =

Ridgers is a surname. Notable people with the surname include:

- Derek Ridgers (born 1952), English photographer
- Mark Ridgers (born 1990), Scottish football goalkeeper

== See also ==
- Rodgers
