= Kevin (TV series) =

American adult animated sitcom

- Genre: Adult animation; Animated sitcom
- Created by: Joe Wengert; Aubrey Plaza
- Starring: Jason Schwartzman; Amy Sedaris; Aparna Nancherla; Gil Ozeri; Aubrey Plaza; John Waters; Whoopi Goldberg
- Music by: Dan Romer
- Opening theme: "I'm Coming Home" by Jason Schwartzman
- Country of origin: United States
- Original language: English
- No. of seasons: 1
- No. of episodes: 8

Production
- Executive producers: Joe Wengert; Aubrey Plaza; Dan Murphy; Chris Prynoski; Shannon Prynoski; Antonio Canobbio; Ben Kalina
- Producer: Robbee Jones
- Editors: Robert Ashe; Andy Maxwell; Jake Reed
- Production companies: B-U-N-G; Evil Hag Productions; Titmouse, Inc.; Amazon MGM Studios

Original release
- Network: Amazon Prime Video
- Release: April 20, 2026

Kevin is an American adult animated sitcom created by Joe Wengert and Aubrey Plaza for Amazon Prime Video. The show depicts Kevin, the titular anthropomorphic cat, adjusting to life on his own following the separation of his two owners in a fictional version of New York City. The series was released on April 20, 2026. On June 19, 2026, it was announced that the series was canceled after one season.

== Premise ==
After his owners separate from each other, Kevin, an anthropomorphic cat living in New York City, moves into a pet rescue in Astoria, Queens with a group of misfit animals.

== Voice cast and characters ==
=== Main ===
- Jason Schwartzman as Kevin, a neurotic tuxedo cat exploring life on his own.
- Amy Sedaris as Brandi, Seth's pet Shih Tzu.
- Aparna Nancherla as Judy, a sickly Scottish Fold kitten.
- Gil Ozeri as Seth, the human owner of "Furrever Friends" pet rescue.
- Aubrey Plaza as Dana, Kevin's former human owner.
- John Waters as Armando, a Persian cat.
- Whoopi Goldberg as Cupcake, a feral hairless cat.

=== Guest ===
- Quinta Brunson
- Neil Casey
- Mike Mitchell
- Pam Murphy
- Jim O'Heir
- Ben Rogers
- Carl Tart
- Lamar Woods
- John Milhiser
- Debby Ryan
- Maria Bamford
- Joe Wengert
- Nick Wiger
- Joe Locke
- Patti LuPone
- Charles Melton
- Addison Rae
- Seth Kirschner
- Stephen Malkmus
- Lennon Parham
- Stephanie Allynne
- Aaron Jackson
- Tig Notaro
- Eugene Cordero
- Cary Elwes

== Episodes ==
No. overall	No. in season	Title	Directed by	Written by	Original release date
1	1	"The Breakup"	Casey Crowe and Angelo Hatgistavrou	Teleplay by : Joe Wengert; Story by : Joe Wengert & Aubrey Plaza	April 20, 2026
2	2	"Animal of the Month"	Casey Crowe	Alison Bennett	April 20, 2026
3	3	"Kitten Season"	Angelo Hatgistavrou and Sarah Seember Huisken	Marcy Jarreau	April 20, 2026
4	4	"In Heat"	Michael Moloney	Jess Dweck	April 20, 2026
5	5	"Quarantined"	Casey Crowe	John T. Reynolds	April 20, 2026
6	6	"Fourth of July"	Sarah Seember Huisken	Corin Wells	April 20, 2026
7	7	"Provincetown"	Michael Moloney	Peter Kelly	April 20, 2026
8	8	"Opening Night"	Casey Crowe	Alison Bennett & Jess Dweck	April 20, 2026

== Production ==
The series was produced through co-creator Aubrey Plaza's Evil Hag Productions banner in collaboration with Titmouse, Inc., and Amazon MGM Studios.

On June 19, 2026, co-creator Joe Wengert revealed on his Instagram account that Amazon Prime Video had canceled the series after one season.

== Release ==
On March 2, 2026, Amazon MGM Studios revealed the series' title sequence. The first episode was shown on April 16, 2026, at Metrograph in New York City. All eight episodes of the series were released on April 20, 2026, on Amazon Prime Video.

== Music ==
Music for the series was composed by Dan Romer. The opening title song "I'm Coming Home" was performed by Schwartzman, who co-wrote the song with Romer.

== Reception ==
The review aggregator website Rotten Tomatoes reported a 64% approval rating based on 11 critic reviews. Metacritic, which uses a weighted average, gave a score of 62 out of 100 based on 7 critics, indicating "generally favorable" reviews.

In a positive review for Variety, Alison Herman praised the show's "enjoyable chaos", noting the similarities of the series to other shows like Big Mouth and Broad City.

In a negative review for The Guardian, critic Sarah Dempster described the series as being "so irretrievably bad it must never be allowed to happen again", giving the show one-star out of five. Clint Worthington for RogerEbert.com found it inferior to its stylistic influences, namely Bojack Horseman and Tuca & Bertie, and criticized the quality of the show's animation as well as its repetitive humour.
