= 2010 AAA Texas 500 =

Race details
- Race 34 of 36 in the 2010 NASCAR Sprint Cup Series
- Date: November 7, 2010
- Location: Texas Motor Speedway in Fort Worth, Texas
- Course: Permanent racing facility
- Course length: 1.5 miles (2.4 km)
- Distance: 334 laps, 501 mi (806.3 km)
- Weather: A high temperature of 71.6 °F (22.0 °C); wind speeds reaching up to 17.26 miles per hour (27.78 km/h).
- Average speed: 140.456 miles per hour (226.042 km/h)

Pole position
Driver	Elliott Sadler	Richard Petty Motorsports
- Time: 27.636

Most laps led
Driver	Greg Biffle	Roush Fenway Racing
- Laps: 223

Winner
No. 11	Denny Hamlin	Joe Gibbs Racing

Television in the United States
- Network: ESPN
- Announcers: Marty Reid, Dale Jarrett and Andy Petree

The 2010 AAA Texas 500 was a NASCAR Sprint Cup Series race that was held on November 7, 2010, at Texas Motor Speedway in Fort Worth, Texas. Contested over 334 laps, it was the thirty-fourth race during the 2010 NASCAR Sprint Cup Series season and the eighth race in the Chase for the Sprint Cup. The race was won by Denny Hamlin of the Joe Gibbs Racing team. Matt Kenseth finished second, and Mark Martin clinched third.

There were nine cautions and thirty-five lead changes among fourteen different drivers throughout the course of the race. It was Hamlin's eighth win in the 2010 season, and his second at Texas Motor Speedway. The result moved him to first in the Drivers' Championship, 33 points ahead Jimmie Johnson in second. Chevrolet maintained its lead in the Manufacturers' Championship, 40 ahead of Toyota and 91 ahead of Ford, with two races remaining in the season. A total of 156,000 people attended the race.

== Report ==
=== Background ===
Texas Motor Speedway, the race track where the race was held.

Texas Motor Speedway is one of ten intermediate to hold NASCAR races. The standard track at Texas Motor Speedway is a four-turn quad-oval track that is 1.5 miles (2.4 km) long. The track's turns are banked at twenty-four degrees, while the front stretch, the location of the finish line, is five degrees. The back stretch, opposite of the front, also has a five degree banking. The racetrack has seats for 191,122 spectators.

Before the race, Jimmie Johnson led the Drivers' Championship with 6,149 points, and Denny Hamlin stood in second with 6,135 points. Kevin Harvick followed in third with 6,111 points, 169 ahead of Jeff Gordon and 192 ahead of Kyle Busch in fourth and fifth. Carl Edwards with 5,902 was seventy points ahead of Tony Stewart, as Matt Kenseth with 5,825 points, was twenty-six ahead of Kurt Busch, and twenty-eight in front of Jeff Burton. Greg Biffle and Clint Bowyer was eleventh and twelfth with 5,788 and 5,788 points. In the Manufacturers' Championship, Chevrolet was leading with 245 points, forty-five points ahead of their rival Toyota. Ford, with 152 points, was twenty-three points ahead of Dodge in the battle for third. Kurt Busch was the race's defending champion.

=== Practice and qualifying ===
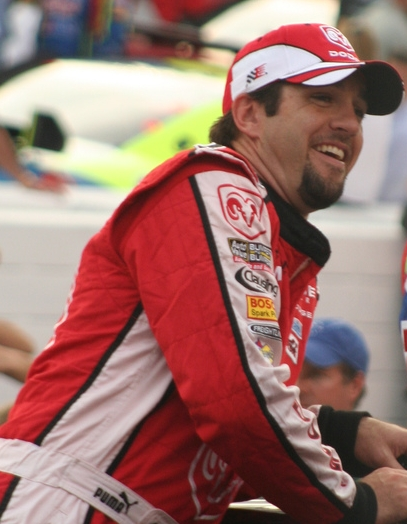
Elliott Sadler (pictured in 2007) won the pole position, after having the fastest time of 27.636 seconds.

Three practice sessions will be held before the Sunday race — one on Friday, and two on Saturday. The first session lasted 90 minutes, while the second session lasted 45 minutes. The third and final practice session lasted 60 minutes. During the first practice session, Biffle, for the Roush Fenway Racing team, was quickest ahead of Edwards in second and Juan Pablo Montoya in the third position. Kenseth was scored fourth, and Elliott Sadler managed fifth. Regan Smith, Paul Menard, Martin Truex Jr., Johnson, and A. J. Allmendinger rounded out the top ten quickest drivers in the session.

Forty-nine cars were entered for qualifying, but only forty-three were able to race because of NASCAR's qualifying procedure. Sadler clinched his eighth pole position during his career, with a time of 27.363, his first since May, 2006 at Talladega Superspeedway. He was joined on the front row of the grid by Biffle. Edwards qualified third, Montoya took fourth, and David Ragan started fifth. Johnson, one of the drivers in the Chase for the Sprint Cup, qualified seventeenth, while Hamlin was scored thirtieth. The six drivers that failed to qualify for the race were J. J. Yeley, Scott Riggs, Michael McDowell, Jeff Green, Josh Wise, and Brian Keselowski. Once the qualifying session completed, Sadler commented, "I’m feeling Superman today! I could sit here and say it is me, or this or that, but [crew chief] Todd Parrott is the man. He can do so much as a crew chief. He is good for me from the mental side and we have been qualifying so much better here the last six weeks or so... that is a really fast lap for me. I got all I can get out of it."

On the next morning, Kyle Busch was quickest in the second practice session, ahead of Edwards and Truex in second and third. Ryan Newman was fourth quickest, and Burton took fifth. Stewart, Montoya, Kurt Busch, Bowyer, and Biffle followed in the top-ten. Other drivers in the chase, such as Hamlin, was eighteenth, and Harvick, who was thirty-first. During the third, and final practice session, Kyle Busch, with a fastest time of 28.696, was quickest. Ragan and Truex followed in second and third with times of 28.765 and 28.884 seconds. Kurt Busch managed to be fourth fastest, ahead of Smith and Sam Hornish Jr. Sadler was scored seventh, Menard took eighth, Gordon was ninth, and Johnson took tenth.

=== Race ===
The race, the thirty-fourth out of a total of thirty-six in the season, began at 3:00 p.m. EST and was televised live in the United States on ESPN. Prior to the race, weather conditions were dry with the air temperature around 69 °F (21 °C). Dr. Roger Marsh, of Texas Alliance Raceway Ministries, began pre-race ceremonies, by giving the invocation. Next, rock singer Kelly Hansen of Atlantic recording artists Foreigner performed the national anthem, and singer Lee Ann Womack gave the command for drivers to start their engines. During the pace laps, Trevor Bayne had to move to the rear of the grid because of changing transmissions.

At the start, Sadler maintained his lead ahead of Biffle. On the following lap, Biffle took the first position away from Sadler, as Montoya maintained fourth. Hamlin, who started the race twenty-eighth, had fallen to thirtieth by the fifth lap. Ragan took over the third position, while his teammate Edwards claimed second on the sixth and eighth laps respectively. On the twelfth lap, the first caution was given because Joe Nemechek's car was putting oil and debris on the track after the engine in his car failed and he slid into the wall. All the front runners made pit stops during the caution. At the lap 17 restart, Biffle remained the leader, ahead of Sadler and Edwards in second and third. Within four laps, Johnson had moved to ninth. On lap 23, Sadler lost third to Mark Martin. The next lap, Dave Blaney's car began smoking, though the caution did not come out; Blaney would take his car to the garage five laps later.

Kurt Busch hit the wall on lap 25, falling to 36th. Johnson continued moving up the field, having advanced to fifth by lap 42. On lap 43, the second caution was given for debris. Martin came off of pit road the leader, followed by Edwards, Kyle Busch, and Biffle. The green flag came back out on lap 47; two laps later, Biffle claimed the lead from Martin. Newman made an unscheduled pit stop on lap 55 as his seatbelt had come undone. The third caution was given three laps later when Hornish hit the turn 3 and 4 wall. Biffle maintained the lead on the restart, followed by Martin, Sadler, Bowyer, and Johnson. Kyle Busch both passed Sadler on lap 65, then passed Bowyer for third four laps later while his teammate Johnson moved into fourth. By lap 74, Sadler had fallen to eighth. Kyle Busch was passed by Johnson and Bowyer on laps 77 and 80 respectively.

Martin, meanwhile, began to close on Biffle, trimming his lead to 0.6 seconds on lap 91. On lap 97, Martin made the pass for the lead. Green flag pit stops began eight laps later when Martin made a pit stop, handing the lead back to Biffle. The lead changed hands a few times while pit stops were being made, with Martin cycling back to the lead on lap 113. About 20 laps after Martin reclaimed the lead, Truex spun into the infield, bringing out the fourth caution. Joey Logano was first off of pit road and led the field on the restart. Biffle took the lead from Logano two laps after the restart. Between laps 144 and 148, Johnson moved from ninth to sixth, passing Bowyer, Harvick, and Kyle Busch. Truex brought out the fifth caution on lap 151, this time for cutting a right-front tire.

Joey Logano won the race off of pit road and he led the field to the restart. Logano and Biffle raced side by side for the race lead for the next 2 laps with Biffle beating out Logano to the finish line both times. On lap 159, the 6th caution flew when Kyle Busch spun in turns 1 and 2. Busch came down pit road to get new tires and he got back out onto the racetrack and beat the pace car to stay on the lead lap. Unfortunately for Busch, he got caught for going too fast on pit road and Busch had to be held on pit road for 1 lap. Frustrated with NASCAR's decision, Busch gave the NASCAR Official who was holding him on pit road the finger. The race restarted on lap 163 and NASCAR penalized Busch again for flipping the NASCAR Official and had to come to pit road to be held for 2 laps. Busch pleaded his case even going as far as saying about the freedom of speech which made his crew chief, Dave Rogers, even more irate with Busch and Rogers yelled at Busch to stop and bring his car to pit road and park it for 2 laps which Busch would do on lap 164.

On lap 177, Joey Logano passed Greg Biffle and took the lead. On lap 191, one of the strangest wrecks in NASCAR history occurred. For the third time in the race, Martin Truex Jr. brought out a caution this time for blowing a right front tire and hitting the wall in turn 3. Meanwhile, Jeff Gordon and Jeff Burton were racing each other for a position when the caution flew in turn 1. Burton went down as if to follow Gordon in turn 2 but instead Burton hooked Gordon and the two hit the outside wall ending their races. Gordon got out of his car and walked halfway down the apron of the backstretch towards Burton's car. Burton got out of his car and walked towards Gordon as if to apologize for what happened. But before words were exchanged, Gordon shoved Burton and the two got into a little bit of a fight on the backstretch with Officials separating both drivers. Both drivers walked into the same ambulance to the infield care center. After Jimmie Johnson had two bad pitstops, Johnson's crew chief Chad Knaus decided to switch pit crew members. He decided to switch Johnson's crew with Jeff Gordon's crew.

The race restarted on lap 201 with Logano leading the field but Greg Biffle passed Logano and took the lead. With 91 laps to go, green flag pit stops began on the race track. Biffle got his lead back after the lead was shared by Kevin Harvick and Matt Kenseth. With 49 laps to go, the second cycle of green flag pit stops began with Joey Logano leading for 2 laps while Biffle pitted and Biffle took the lead back after everything cycled through. After 100 green flag laps, the 8th caution flew with 35 laps to go for debris. Kevin Harvick won the race off of pit road but Mark Martin and Tony Stewart stayed out of pit road and Martin led the field to the restart with 30 laps to go.

With 29 laps to go, Denny Hamlin passed Mark Martin and Hamlin took the lead. Hamlin had built a large lead over Matt Kenseth but with 7 laps to go, the 9th and final caution flew when Patrick Carpentier spun in turn 2. Some went onto pit road while others stayed out including Hamlin and Kenseth. The race restarted with 3 laps to go. Hamlin and Kenseth raced side by side for the lead with Hamlin beating Kenseth to the line with 3 laps to go. With 2 laps to go, Kenseth passed Hamlin in turn 2 but Hamlin pulled the cross-over move on Kenseth and Kenseth got loose out of turn 2 and Hamlin passed Kenseth for the lead. Kenseth tried to catch Hamlin but Hamlin pulled away from Kenseth and Denny Hamlin won his 8th and final race of the 2010 season and Kenseth finished in 2nd. The win would boost Hamlin to the points lead. Mark Martin, Joey Logano, and Greg Biffle rounded out the top 5 while Kevin Harvick, Clint Bowyer, David Ragan, Jimmie Johnson, and Paul Menard rounded out the top 10.

== Results ==
=== Qualifying ===
Grid	No.	Driver	Team	Manufacturer	Time	Speed
1	19	Elliott Sadler	Richard Petty Motorsports	Ford	27.636	195.397
2	16	Greg Biffle	Roush Fenway Racing	Ford	27.885	193.652
3	99	Carl Edwards	Roush Fenway Racing	Ford	27.886	193.646
4	42	Juan Pablo Montoya	Earnhardt Ganassi Racing	Chevrolet	27.910	193.479
5	6	David Ragan	Roush Fenway Racing	Ford	27.918	193.424
6	2	Kurt Busch	Penske Racing	Dodge	27.925	193.375
7	33	Clint Bowyer	Richard Childress Racing	Chevrolet	27.933	193.320
8	78	Regan Smith	Furniture Row Racing	Chevrolet	27.948	193.216
9	5	Mark Martin	Hendrick Motorsports	Chevrolet	27.954	193.174
10	43	A. J. Allmendinger	Richard Petty Motorsports	Ford	27.966	193.092
11	14	Tony Stewart	Stewart–Haas Racing	Chevrolet	27.968	193.078
12	98	Paul Menard	Richard Petty Motorsports	Ford	28.012	192.775
13	9	Aric Almirola	Richard Petty Motorsports	Ford	28.037	192.603
14	39	Ryan Newman	Stewart–Haas Racing	Chevrolet	28.071	192.369
15	24	Jeff Gordon	Hendrick Motorsports	Chevrolet	28.126	191.993
16	31	Jeff Burton	Richard Childress Racing	Chevrolet	28.127	191.986
17	48	Jimmie Johnson	Hendrick Motorsports	Chevrolet	28.134	191.939
18	00	David Reutimann	Michael Waltrip Racing	Toyota	28.141	191.891
19	17	Matt Kenseth	Roush Fenway Racing	Ford	28.142	191.884
20	20	Joey Logano	Joe Gibbs Racing	Toyota	28.159	191.768
21	56	Martin Truex Jr.	Michael Waltrip Racing	Toyota	28.162	191.748
22	88	Dale Earnhardt Jr.	Hendrick Motorsports	Chevrolet	28.163	191.741
23	82	Scott Speed	Red Bull Racing Team	Toyota	28.173	191.673
24	83	Kasey Kahne	Red Bull Racing Team	Toyota	28.184	191.598
25	1	Jamie McMurray	Earnhardt Ganassi Racing	Chevrolet	28.189	191.564
26	29	Kevin Harvick	Richard Childress Racing	Chevrolet	28.190	191.557
27	77	Sam Hornish Jr.	Penske Racing	Dodge	28.194	191.530
28	21	Trevor Bayne	Wood Brothers Racing	Ford	28.259	191.090
29	18	Kyle Busch	Joe Gibbs Racing	Toyota	28.264	191.056
30	11	Denny Hamlin	Joe Gibbs Racing	Toyota	28.277	190.968
31	10	Bobby Labonte	Stavola Labonte Racing	Chevrolet	28.295	190.846
32	47	Marcos Ambrose	JTG Daugherty Racing	Toyota	28.297	190.833
33	38	David Gilliland	Front Row Motorsports	Ford	28.391	190.201
34	87	Joe Nemechek	NEMCO Motorsports	Toyota	28.403	190.121
35	13	Casey Mears	Germain Racing	Toyota	28.463	189.720
36	12	Brad Keselowski	Penske Racing	Dodge	28.476	189.633
37	26	Patrick Carpentier	Latitude 43 Motorsports	Ford	28.533	189.255
38	66	Mike Bliss	Prism Motorsports	Toyota	28.541	189.202
39	7	Robby Gordon	Robby Gordon Motorsports	Toyota	28.594	188.851
40	71	Andy Lally	TRG Motorsports	Chevrolet	28.628	188.626
41	34	Travis Kvapil	Front Row Motorsports	Ford	28.825	188.626
42	37	Dave Blaney	Front Row Motorsports	Ford	28.825	185.663
43	09	Landon Cassill	Phoenix Racing	Chevrolet	28.572	188.996
Failed to Qualify
44	36	J. J. Yeley	Tommy Baldwin Racing	Chevrolet	28.621	188.673
45	81	Scott Riggs	Whitney Motorsports	Chevrolet	28.624	188.653
46	46	Michael McDowell	Whitney Motorsports	Chevrolet	28.746	187.852
47	64	Jeff Green	Gunselman Motorsports	Toyota	28.851	187.169
48	23	Josh Wise	R3 Motorsports	Toyota	29.041	185.944
49	92	Brian Keselowski	K-Automotive Motorsports	Dodge	29.658	182.076

=== Race results ===
Pos	No.	Driver	Team	Manufacturer	Laps	Points
1	11	Denny Hamlin	Joe Gibbs Racing	Toyota	334	190
2	17	Matt Kenseth	Roush Fenway Racing	Ford	334	175
3	5	Mark Martin	Hendrick Motorsports	Chevrolet	334	170
4	20	Joey Logano	Joe Gibbs Racing	Toyota	334	165
5	16	Greg Biffle	Roush Fenway Racing	Ford	334	165
6	29	Kevin Harvick	Richard Childress Racing	Chevrolet	334	155
7	33	Clint Bowyer	Richard Childress Racing	Chevrolet	334	146
8	6	David Ragan	Roush Fenway Racing	Ford	334	142
9	48	Jimmie Johnson	Hendrick Motorsports	Chevrolet	334	143
10	98	Paul Menard	Richard Petty Motorsports	Ford	334	134
11	14	Tony Stewart	Stewart–Haas Racing	Chevrolet	334	130
12	47	Marcos Ambrose	JTG Daugherty Racing	Toyota	334	127
13	83	Kasey Kahne	Red Bull Racing Team	Toyota	334	124
14	43	A. J. Allmendinger	Richard Petty Motorsports	Ford	334	121
15	00	David Reutimann	Michael Waltrip Racing	Toyota	334	118
16	1	Jamie McMurray	Earnhardt Ganassi Racing	Chevrolet	334	115
17	21	Trevor Bayne	Wood Brothers Racing	Ford	334	112
18	77	Sam Hornish Jr.	Penske Racing	Dodge	334	109
19	99	Carl Edwards	Roush Fenway Racing	Ford	334	106
20	39	Ryan Newman	Stewart–Haas Racing	Chevrolet	334	103
21	9	Aric Almirola	Richard Petty Motorsports	Ford	334	100
22	78	Regan Smith	Furniture Row Racing	Chevrolet	334	97
23	19	Elliott Sadler	Richard Petty Motorsports	Ford	333	94
24	2	Kurt Busch	Penske Racing	Dodge	333	91
25	88	Dale Earnhardt Jr.	Hendrick Motorsports	Chevrolet	333	88
26	13	Casey Mears	Germain Racing	Toyota	333	90
27	82	Scott Speed	Red Bull Racing Team	Toyota	333	82
28	42	Juan Pablo Montoya	Earnhardt Ganassi Racing	Chevrolet	333	79
29	38	David Gilliland	Front Row Motorsports	Ford	333	81
30	10	Bobby Labonte	Stavola-Labonte Racing	Chevrolet	333	73
31	26	Patrick Carpentier	Latitude 43 Motorsports	Ford	333	75
32	18	Kyle Busch	Joe Gibbs Racing	Toyota	332	67
33	12	Brad Keselowski	Penske Racing	Dodge	332	64
34	71	Andy Lally	TRG Motorsports	Chevrolet	331	66
35	7	Robby Gordon	Robby Gordon Motorsports	Toyota	240	63
36	31	Jeff Burton	Richard Childress Racing	Chevrolet	192	55
37	24	Jeff Gordon	Hendrick Motorsports	Chevrolet	190	52
38	56	Martin Truex Jr.	Michael Waltrip Racing	Toyota	188	49
39	66	Mike Bliss	Prism Motorsports	Toyota	45	51
40	09	Landon Cassill	Phoenix Racing	Chevrolet	35	43
41	34	Travis Kvapil	Front Row Motorsports	Ford	25	40
42	37	Dave Blaney	Front Row Motorsports	Ford	23	37
43	87	Joe Nemechek	NEMCO Motorsports	Toyota	12	34

== Standings after the race ==
Drivers' Championship standings
Rank	Driver	Points
1	Denny Hamlin	6,325
2	Jimmie Johnson	6,292
3	Kevin Harvick	6,266
4	Carl Edwards	6,008
5	Matt Kenseth	6,000
6	Jeff Gordon	5,994
7	Kyle Busch	5,986
8	Tony Stewart	5,962
9	Greg Biffle	5,953
10	Clint Bowyer	5,928
11	Kurt Busch	5,890
12	Jeff Burton	5,852

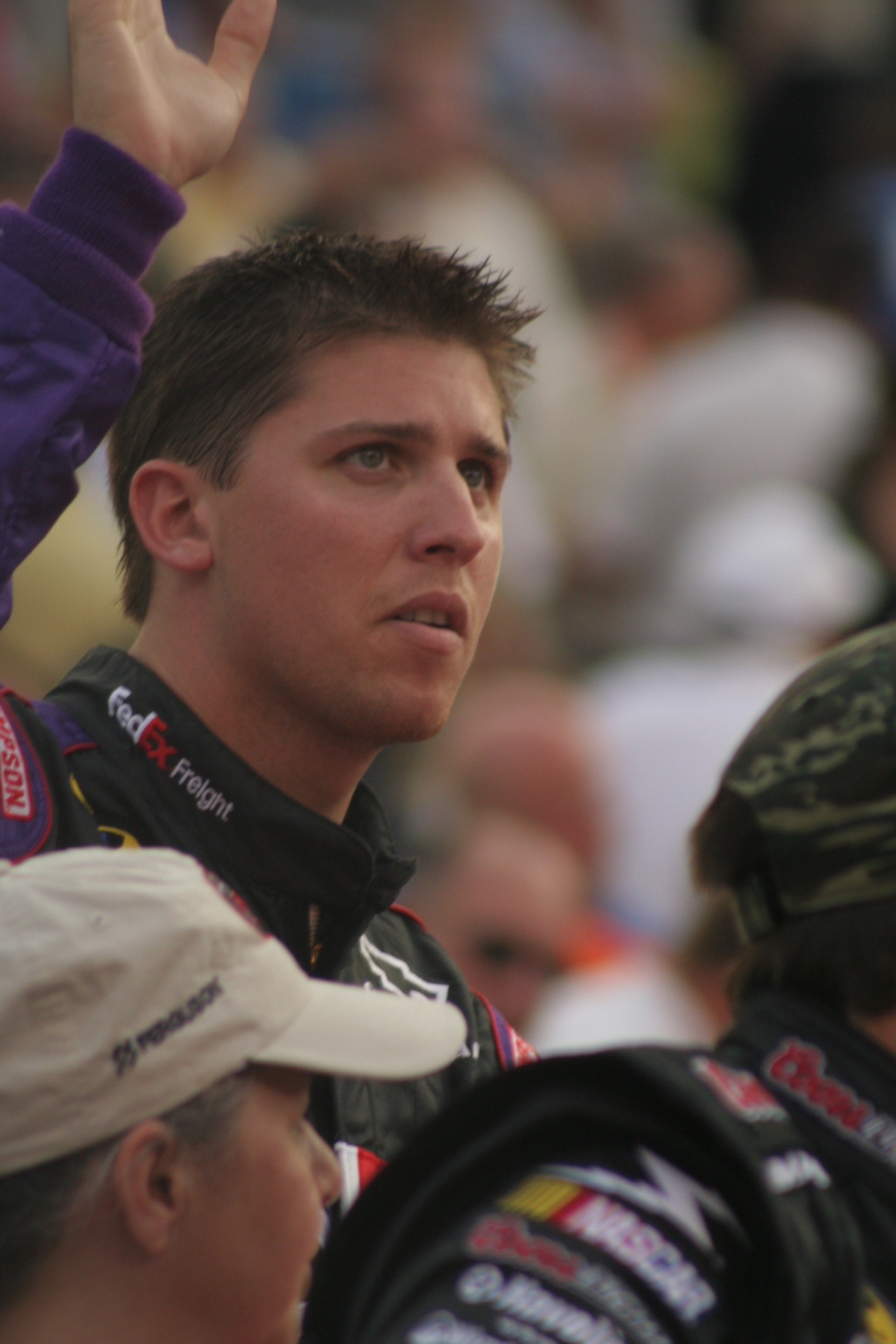
Denny Hamlin became the Drivers' championship leader, after winning the race.

Manufacturers' Championship standings
Rank	Manufacturer	Points
1	Chevrolet	249
2	Toyota	249
3	Ford	158
4	Dodge	132

- Note: Only the top twelve positions are included for the driver standings. These drivers qualified for the Chase for the Sprint Cup.

Previous race: 2010 AMP Energy Juice 500	Sprint Cup Series; 2010 season	Next race: 2010 Kobalt Tools 500
