= Bob Rogers =

Bob Rogers may refer to:

- Bob Rogers (SAAF officer) (1921–2000), South African Air Force officer and Member of Parliament
- Bob Rogers (bobsleigh) (1923–1995), American Olympic bobsledder
- Bob Rogers (DJ) (1926–2024), Australian radio disc jockey
- Bob Rogers (designer), founder and chairman of BRC Imagination Arts in the US
- Bob Rogers (novelist), American writer under the pennames of Lee Rogers, Jean Barrett, and Jean Thomas
- Bob Rogers (rower) (1934–2017), American athlete who competed at the 1960 Summer Olympics

== See also ==
- Bob Rodgers (fl. 1987–2012), American former sportscaster and television producer
- Robert Rogers (disambiguation)
