= Margaret Rodgers =

Margaret Rodgers may refer to:

- Margaret Rodgers (deaconess) (1939–2014), Australian Anglican church leader
- Margaret Catharine Rodgers (born 1964), American federal jurist

== See also ==
- Margaret Rogers (disambiguation)
