= Nathaniel Rogers =

Nathaniel, Nathan or Nat Rogers may refer to:

- Nathaniel Rogers (minister) (1598–1655), English clergyman and early New England pastor
- Nathaniel Peabody Rogers (1794–1846), American lawyer, abolitionist writer and newspaper editor
- Nathaniel Rogers (physician) (1808–1884), English medical practitioner and donor of stained glass windows
- Nat Rogers (1893–1981), African-American baseball player
- Nathan Rogers (writer) (1638– after 1708), Welsh political radical and writer
- Nathaniel Rogers (painter) (1787–1844), American painter
- Nathaniel Rogers (MP) (died c. 1738), British merchant and politician
- Nathan Rogers (born 1979), Canadian folk musician and songwriter

== See also ==
- Rogers (surname)
- Nathaniel Rogers House, American historic home on Long Island in Suffolk County hamlet of Bridgehampton
