= Ian Rogers =

Ian Rogers may refer to:

- Ian Rogers (chess player) (born 1960), Australian chess grandmaster
- Ian Rogers (referee) (1957–1998), South African rugby referee
- Ian Rogers (singer), singer, member of band Still Pending
- Ian Rogers (writer) (born 1976), Canadian supernatural and horror writer
