= Timothy Rogers (disambiguation) =

Timothy Rogers (1658–1728) was an English minister.

Timothy Rogers may also refer to:

- Timothy Rogers (Puritan), (1589–1650?), English Puritian cleric
- Timothy Rogers (Quaker leader) (1756–1834), Canadian Quaker
- Jack Ladder (Timothy Kenneth Rogers, born 1983), Australian singer-songwriter

== See also ==
- Tim Rogers (disambiguation)
