= Anthony Rogers =

Anthony Rogers may refer to:

- Anthony A. C. Rogers (1821–1899), American politician
- Anthony Rogers (actor), British actor
- Anthony Rogers (motorcyclist) (born 1990), British motorcycle racer
- Rufus Rogers (Anthony Trevelyan Rogers, 1913–2009), New Zealand politician of the Labour Party
- Buck Rogers, a fictional character originally called Anthony Rogers

== See also ==
- Tony Rogers (disambiguation)
- Anton Rodgers (1933–2007), English actor
- Anton Rodgers (footballer) (born 1993), Irish football player
