= Shipley Art Gallery =

Art gallery in Gateshead, United Kingdom

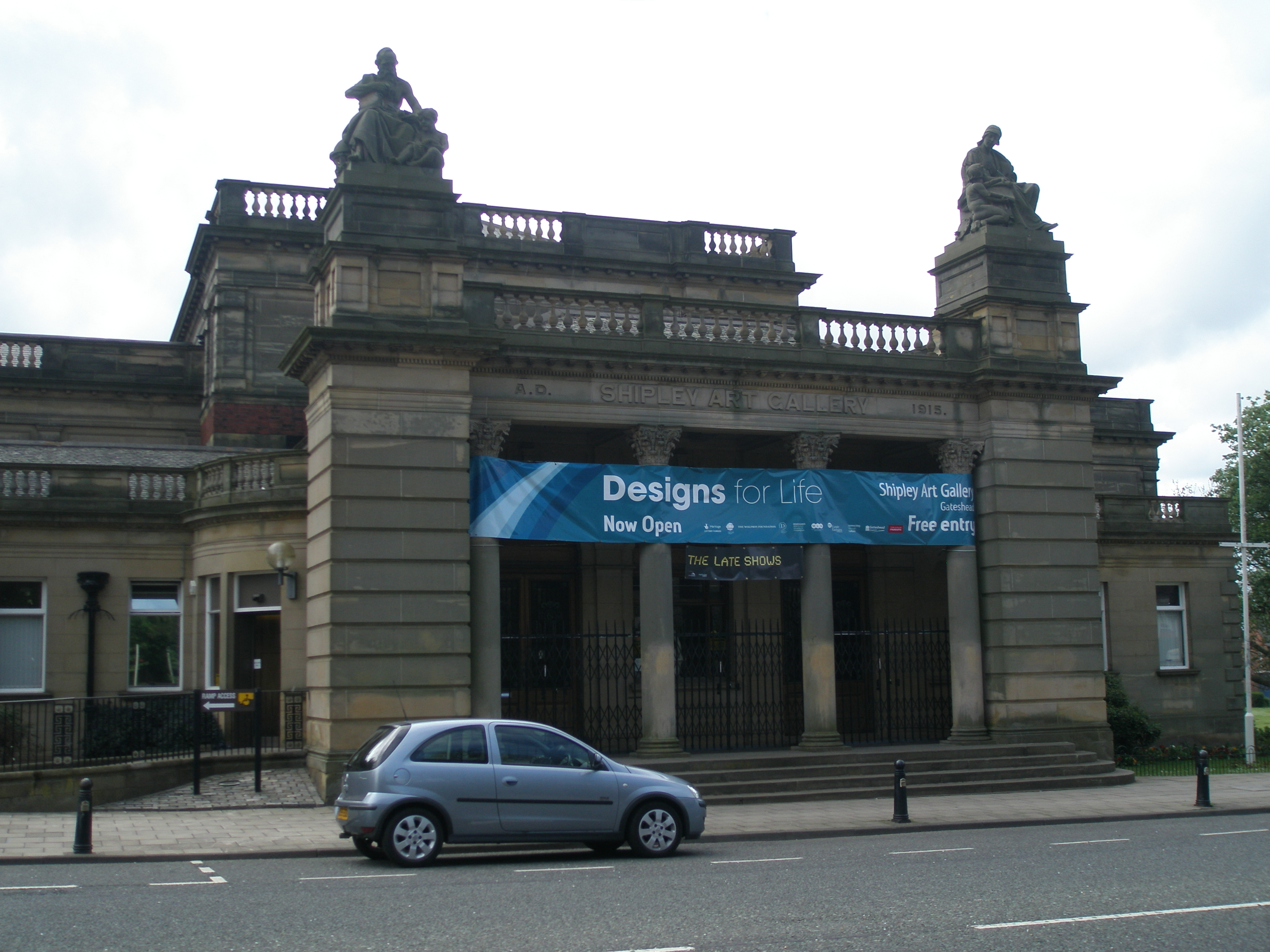

- Shipley Art Gallery shown within Tyne and Wear; OS grid reference NZ256617
- Location: Gateshead, Tyne and Wear, England
- Coordinates: 54.950°N 1.602°W
- Website: www.northeastmuseums.org.uk/shipley

The Shipley Art Gallery is an art gallery in Gateshead, Tyne and Wear, England, located at the south end of Prince Consort Road. It has a Designated Collection of national importance.

== Origins ==
The Shipley Art Gallery opened to the public in 1917. This was made possible by a bequest from wealthy local solicitor and art collector, Joseph Ainsley Davidson Shipley (1822–1909).

Shipley was a rather enigmatic person about whom little is known. He was born in Gateshead, near High Street. He was a solicitor in the Newcastle firm of Hoyle, Shipley and Hoyle. From 1884 until his death, he leased Saltwell Park House, now known as Saltwell Towers. Shipley's main passion was art and collecting paintings. He bought his first painting when he was sixteen and by the time he died he had amassed a collection of some 2,500 paintings.

On his death, Shipley left £30,000 and all his pictures to the City of Newcastle, which was to build a new gallery to house the collection. This was to be known as "The Shipley Bequest". Current belief within local history circles is that Shipley’s will expressly banned Newcastle’s art gallery as a recipient of the bequest, but this assertion must be dismissed: since the foundation stone of the Laing Art Gallery was laid only in August 1901 and the gallery opened in October 1904, the institution did not yet exist in 1900, when Shipley’s will was compiled. Shipley’s will did, in fact, declare that ‘the Art Gallery to be erected in Higham Place will not be and shall not be regarded as an Art Gallery within this trust’, owing to its being ‘too small’, but he conceded that if it ‘shall be capable of being enlarged so as to render it capable of holding all, then I direct my Trustees to raise the sum of £30,000 out of my residuary estate and pay the same to the treasurer of the gallery to be applied in or toward such enlargement as aforesaid’. It was only following a lengthy process that the County Borough of Gateshead was offered the collection. As it was impossible to house all of the paintings, 359 of the pictures recommended by the executors of Shipley's will were selected. A further group was then added by the Gateshead Committee, bringing the total to 504.

In 1914, after the sale of the remaining paintings, work began on the new art gallery. The building, which was designed by Arthur Stockwell, M.S.A. of Newcastle, opened on 29 November 1917. The stone entrance portico is distyle in antis – four Corinthian-style stone columns flanked by solid pilasters. These are surmounted by two sculptured figures, one representing the Arts and the other Industry and Learning, by W. Birnie Rhind, RSA. of Edinburgh.

Pevsner described the art gallery as a "bold arrangement of a brick central block and lower wings containing galleries". The building was designated as Grade II listed in 1982.

== Present gallery ==
The original 504 paintings represented all the main European schools from the 16th to the 19th centuries. Since 1917, the collection has been added to, and now comprises some 10,000 items.

The gallery holds a strong collection of 16th- and 17th-century Dutch and Flemish paintings, as well as 19th-century British works, watercolours, prints, drawings and sculpture. Also featured are items of local interest, which include the popular painting by William C. Irving (1866–1943) of "Blaydon Races" (1903) and a 1970 street scene of Redheugh Crossroads by Gateshead-born Charlie Rogers.

Since 1977 the gallery has become established as a national centre for contemporary craftwork. It has built up one of the best collections outside London, which includes ceramics, wood, metal, glass, textiles and furniture. The Shipley is home to the Henry Rothschild collection of studio ceramics. In 2008, the Shipley opened its Designs for Life gallery which showcases the gallery's collections of contemporary craft and design. The Gallery also hosts a varied programme of temporary exhibitions and has a strong partnership with the V&A Museum in London.

The Shipley Art Gallery is managed by North East Museums on behalf of Gateshead Council.
