= Les Rogers =

Les Rogers may refer to:

- Les Rogers (footballer) (1896–1916), Australian rules footballer
- Les Rogers (curler), Canadian curler
- Les Rogers (rugby league) (1909–1939), Australian rugby league footballer

== See also ==
- Lesley Rogers, figure skater in 1997 World Figure Skating Championships
- Leslie Rogers (disambiguation)
