= Thomas Rodgers =

Thomas or Tom Rodgers may refer to:

- Thomas A. Rodgers (died 1821), Secretary of State of Alabama
- Thomas S. Rodgers (1858–1931), U.S. Navy officer in the Spanish–American War
- Tom Rodgers (born 1960), advocate for Native Americans and tribal issues
- Thomas Rodgers (born 1979), heir apparent of the Rodgers baronets
- Thomas Malin Rodgers (1943–2012), founder of Gathering for Gardner
- Tom Rodgers (mountain bike racer) (died 2009)

== See also ==
- Thomas Rogers (disambiguation)
- Thomas Rodger (1832–1883), Scottish photographer
