= John Rogerson =

John Rogerson may refer to:

- John Rogerson (MP for Coventry), see Coventry
- Sir John Rogerson (1648–1724), Irish politician, merchant and property developer; Member of Parliament for Clogher and Dublin City
- John Rogerson (1676–1741), his son, Member of Parliament for Granard and Dublin City; Solicitor-General for Ireland, 1714–1720
- John Rogerson (physician) (born 1741), Scots born physician to the Russian court of Catherine the Great
- John Bolton Rogerson (1809–1859), English poet
- John Rogerson (Barnard Castle MP) (1865–1925), Conservative Member of Parliament, 1922–1923
- John W. Rogerson (1935–2018), biblical scholar and Church of England priest
