= Charles P. Rogers =

American industrialist

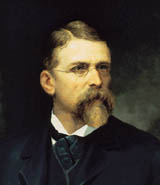
- Charles Platt Rogers
- Born: Charles Platt Rogers; May 5, 1829; New York City
- Died: December 17, 1917 (aged 88); New York City
- Resting place: Kensico Cemetery
- Other names: Chas P. Roger, Chas Rogers, Charles Rogers.
- Occupations: Industrialist, bedding manufacturer, importer, banker
- Known for: Founder Of Charles P. Rogers & Co. America's oldest existing bedding manufacturer.
- Successor: William O. Rogers
- Board member of: Fourteenth Street Bank of New York
- Spouse: Anna Burt Rogers
- Children: Minnie Rogers (Zabriskie)
- Parent(s): Andrew Yelverton Rogers, Jane (Phillips) Rogers
- Relatives: William Oscar Rogers
- Website: charlesprogers.com

Charles (Chas) Platt Rogers (May 5, 1829, in New York City – December 17, 1917, in New York City) was an early American industrialist, New York City socialite and charter member and director of the Fourteenth Street Bank of New York. His longest lasting achievement was the founding the eponymous company Charles P Rogers & Co. established in 1855. It is the longest continuously operating bedding manufacturing and retail company in the United States. The company continues operations to this day and provided more beds and bedding to the finest hotels and clubs than any other company during its first hundred years. Charles was a pioneer in both the manufacturing processes and importation of brass and iron bedstead and a beloved member of the business community of New York; after his death he was referred to as the "dean of the bedding manufacturers of New York City…" in The Furniture Manufacturer and Artisan Periodical, volume 15, 1918.

== Early life and family ==
Charles P. Rogers was born in New York City, the second son of merchant Andrew Yelverton Rogers and Jane Phillips (born 1796, New York City, died 1874 Southold, Long Island). In 1854 Charles was married to Anna Burt. (born 1834 Oswego, New York, died April 30, 1916, New York City) Anna was the granddaughter of Daniel Burt (born 1740, Ridgefield, Connecticut, died 1823, Oswego, NY) a soldier in the American Revolution who served in the Orange County, New York, militia at the battle of Minisink, under Col. John Hathorn. Chas and Anna had one daughter, Minnie Rogers (Zabriskie) (born 1857, died NYC) who would later play a role in his bed manufacturing business, becoming a leading player in the company following her father's death in 1917.

== Entrepreneurial beginnings ==
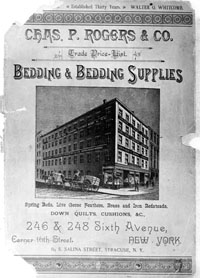
Rogers New York City storefront at 246 & 248 Sixth Ave. Manhattan

Rogers began his entry in the bed manufacturing business contracting cots for Public School 135 in the Borough of Manhattan in 1854, with another bedding maker named Bradford Willard, a loose association which continued until the late 1850s. Due to bed bugs and vermin during this period in the city, iron and brass beds became fashionable both for style and as they harbored no hiding places for the pests as most wood furniture did. Rogers looked to capitalize on this growing demand. His first retail location in New York City was at 384 Hudson Ave. in lower Manhattan. Chas was selling mattresses, cots, iron bed frames and wholesaling other materials while developing contacts and suppliers for his brass bed business which he began in earnest in early 1855. He began selling brass beds after becoming the sole importer of Fisher Brown & Co. of Birmingham, England one of the major European producers of sought after, finely crafted brass beds. As his bedding business increased he began selling other items such as down comforters, pillows, bedsprings, divans, iron bedsteads and also began making specialized yacht cushions.

== Successful industrial pioneer ==
Rogers soon became the leading importer as well as manufacturer of high-end brass and iron bedsteads and bedding in New York City. After being highly recommended in the 1870 New York Shopping Guide, he was supplying not only the social elite of the city, but also furnishing the major New York luxury hotels such as The Waldorf-Astoria Hotel, St. Regis New York, Hotel Manhattan, Holland House, the Herald Square and other fine hotels. The renowned quality and reputation of the company soon led to supplying more distant hotels such as The New Willard in Wash. DC, The Hotel Belvedere in Baltimore and The New St. Charles in New Orleans, LA. Rogers moved the company operations to 264 to 266 6th Ave. and 17th St. in Manhattan to accommodate the increasing demand for his products in both domestic and commercial applications. He was also active in supplying wholesale supplies to other furniture makers in the city including the Herter Brothers. Chas also opened a second retail location at 89 S. Salina Street in Syracuse, New York, in 1882 and had moved locations to 346–348 S. Warren Street, Syracuse by 1885.

In 1894, Rogers took on his first true partner, his nephew William O. Rogers (born 1864, died January 1, 1944, Madison, New Jersey.) William was the son of Charles' older brother, William Oscar Rogers (born April 12, 1825, New York City, died December 17, 1919, Madison, New Jersey) who was the New Orleans superintendent of schools and Second President of Tulane University, Acting 1899–1900. Ironically and much to his New York families displeasure, he was also a Confederate soldier, having moved to New Orleans for health reasons in 1848 after a horse riding accident.

As the bed business flourished due to increased availability of home oriented print advertising in publications such as McClure's, Scribner's Magazine, The Century Magazine, Harper's Magazine Making of America Project (1896). Harper's Magazine. Harper's Magazine Co. and The Catholic World, more responsibility fell on William Rogers for running the day-to-day operations of the highly lucrative company. Chas and Anna spent more time at socialite vacation destinations such as Richfield Springs, New York and Cooperstown, New York, attending parties and holding elegant dinners. Chas and Anna were staying at the Spring House Hotel in Richfield when it was consumed by fire in 1897 along with New York city Mayor William L. Strong. As a result of the fire by 1910 had purchased the famous Crossways Cottage in Cooperstown, NY for hosting their social events. Chas P. Rogers Co. hotels serviced now included New York Biltmore Hotel, The Vanderbilt and The Belmont.

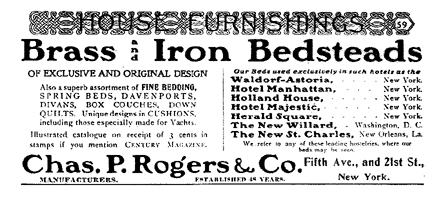
Servicing the finest hotels in New York and beyond fueled Chas P Rogers success and fortune between 1870 and 1915.

== The hard times ==
World War I caused a tremendous scarcity of the materials needed for the brass and iron bed business and badly affected all metal bed makers in the world. After the death of his wife Anna in 1916 of pneumonia, Chas turned over the company operations entirely to the direction of his nephew William who had then been acting president for over 15 years. Charles dedicated himself to his flower arranging hobby for the remainder of his life while leaving the business to his trusted associates. Rogers died in 1917 but the company he founded continued on in his absence. A re-organization took place in 1918 with his daughter Minnie Zabriskie, William O. Rogers and G. F. Burt (born 1869, died 1943, New York City) taking the leading roles as partners. Their leadership coincided with a large capital increase in 1925.

== His name becomes his legacy ==
After the death of William O. Rogers in 1919 and the retirement of G.F. Burt in late 1936, Sims Read assumed the presidency of the company in 1937. Read was the presiding head during the 100th year celebration held at the New York Biltmore Hotel in 1955 as covered by The New Yorker. In 1946, industrialist Maj. General John W. Morgan (winner of the Croix de Guerre in World War I and also president of the Cox Gelatin Company) became board chairman of the Charles P. Rogers & Co., which had temporarily moved its manufacturing to Yonkers, New York. He continued in that capacity until his death at the age of 69.

More than 150 years after the company was founded, The Charles P Rogers Co. is still a manufacturer of hand crafted beds, mattresses, linens, and related bedding products. In the tradition of its founder, Charles P. Rogers still hand crafts iron, wood, and leather beds. Their beds are sold through decorators, their factory showrooms at 26 W. 17th St., Manhattan and in East Rutherford, New Jersey, the internet, and through their mail order catalogs.

Rogers's beds have also been used in popular culture appearing in movies such as The Devil's Advocate in 1997 and 88 Minutes in 2007 both starring Al Pacino. Television placements include season one of America's Next Top Model in 2003, Extreme Home Makeover on ABC and Catalog This on the Fine Living Network.

Rogers was renowned in his lifetime as a businessman and innovator. His company still resonates today, recently author Emily Giffin mentioned the company as the source for the "four-poster marital bed" in the 2004 The New York Times bestseller Something Borrowed

== Other sources ==
Fitzhugh, Armistead (1929) The Architect and the Industrial Arts: An Exhibition of Contemporary American Design. Metropolitan Museum of Art. Original from the University of Michigan. Digitized August 30, 2006. Google Book Search. Retrieved November 23, 2007.

The Furniture Manufacturer and Artisan. (1918) Volume 15, 1918. Periodical Publishing Co. Original in New York Public Library. Google Book Search. Retrieved November 12, 2007.

Furniture Making (1918) v. 76, no. 15 Original from the New York Public Library. Digitized June 14, 2006. Google Book Search. Retrieved October 15, 2007.

Directory of Directors in the City of New York (14th street bank) (1909/10) Audit Co. Original from Harvard University. Digitized May 8, 2007. Google Book Search. Retrieved November 12, 2007.

Transportation: Devoted to Travel and Traffic (1900–01) "Brass and Iron Bedsteads of beautiful and exclusive design. Fine Bedding, Spring-Beds. ... Chas. P. Rogers & Co., Fifth Ave. and ..." Original from the New York Public Library v. 4–5. p. 25. Digitized April 19, 2007. Google Book Search. Retrieved November 18, 2007.
