= Charlie Rogers (painter) =

English painter (born 1930)

Charles (known as Charlie) Henry Rogers (1930-2020) was a self-taught artist from Gateshead. Turning to painting after a sports injury in the 1960s, he made unpretentious Tyneside localities and their inhabitants his subject matter.

== Life ==
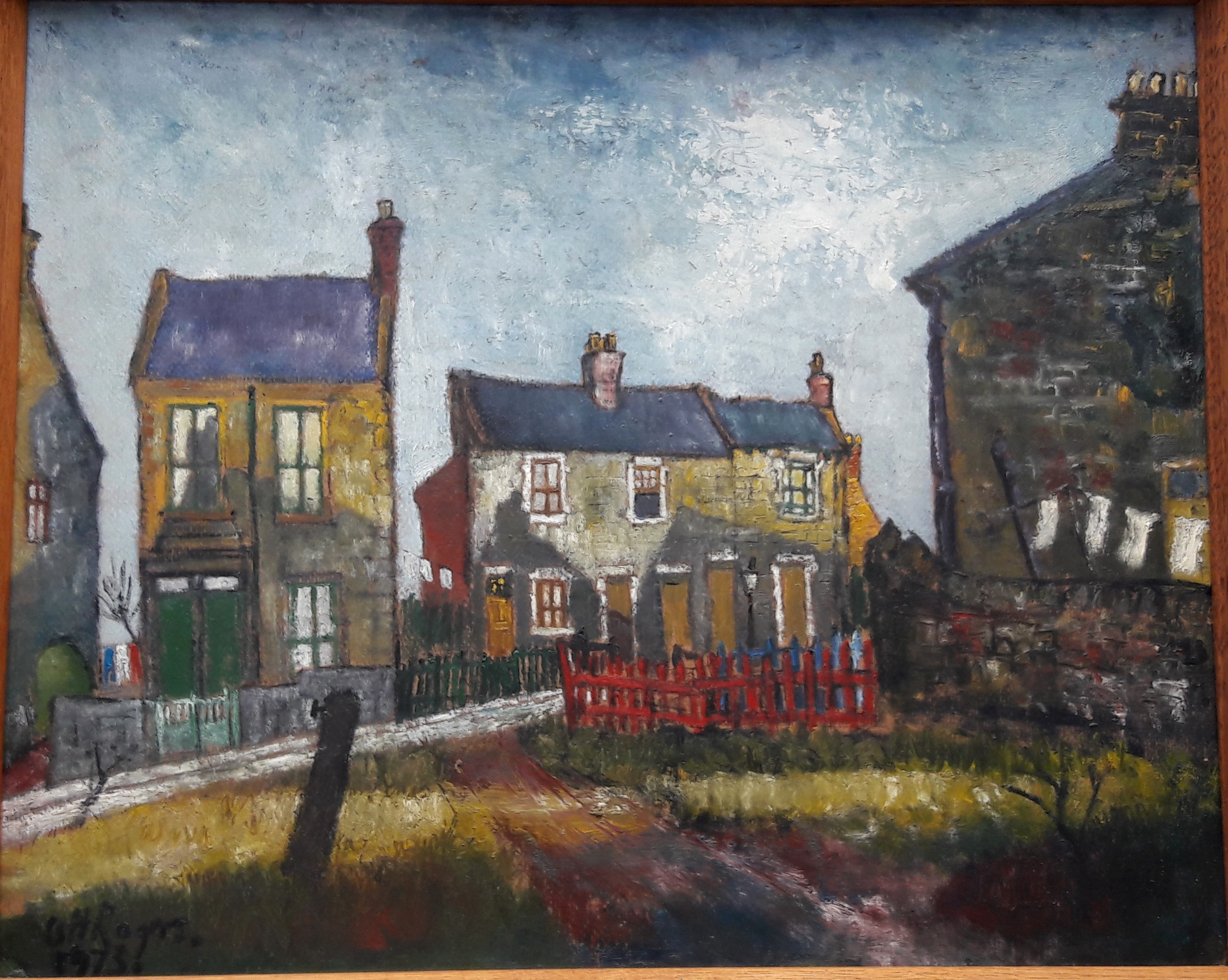
Gateshead Cottages, Charlie Rogers, 1973

Charlie Rogers was born near Saltwell Park in Gateshead. He suffered a footballing injury when he was 34 and then took to sketching and eventually painting local street scenes, although he never had formal art training. His first exhibition was at the Univision Gallery in Newcastle upon Tyne in 1965 and thereafter he showed at the Laing Art Gallery and Northumbria University, as well as at smaller venues. Outside the North East, he also exhibited at London's National Gallery and the Royal Scottish Academy. Later in life he moved to Low Fell and one of his final exhibitions was hung at the library there at the end of 2016.

Charlie was a life-long member of the Gateshead Art Society and a former holder of the Tyne Tees Trident Fellowship. One of his paintings now hangs in the town's Shipley Art Gallery. Working in both watercolour and oil, his chosen subjects have always been street scenes, local characters and recognisable buildings worked up from life. However, his partiality to back lanes and unmodernised parts meant that he was often one step ahead of the demolition teams and their bulldozers. This gave his work an element of nostalgia in consequence, which made it greatly sought after. It was a love of urban landscapes that he shared with Norman Cornish, with whom he was particularly friendly, and with the much older L. S. Lowry.

After the artist's death in a care home during the 2020 COVID-19 pandemic, his cause was taken up by Brian Rankin, another local artist, who organised a retrospective exhibition at Gateshead Public Library in 2025 and devoted a book to his work: Charlie Rogers: Pursued by Bulldozers.
