= Kevin Rogers =

Kevin Rogers may refer to:

- Kevin Rogers (American football) (born 1951), American football coach and former player
- Kevin Rogers (baseball) (born 1968), former Major League Baseball pitcher
- Kevin Rogers (footballer) (born 1963), Welsh former footballer

== See also ==
- Kevin Rodgers (disambiguation)
