= Asa Rogers =

Asa Rogers may refer to:

- Asa Rogers (Virginia) (1802–1887), American farmer, merchant, politician and Confederate officer
- Asa Rogers (Wisconsin) (1829–1901), American carpenter, contractor, and politician
