= David Rogers (meteorologist) =

- Alma mater: University of East Anglia; University of Southampton
- Employer: Met Office; University of Nevada, Reno (1983–1988)

David Peter Rogers (born 20 March 1957) was Chief Executive of the Met Office from June 2004 to July 2005. Since 2007, he has been President and Chairman of the Health and Climate Foundation, a charity with headquarters in Washington, DC.

He was educated at the University of East Anglia (BSc) and the University of Southampton (PhD), where his thesis was on numerical modelling of the atmospheric boundary layer over the ocean.
