= Tom Rodger =

Scottish footballer

Personal information
- Full name: Thomas Rodger
- Date of birth: 1882
- Place of birth: Dundee, Scotland
- Position: Winger

Senior career*
Years	Team	Apps	(Gls)
1902–1904	Dundee		
1904	Manchester United	0	(0)
1904–1906	Preston North End	5	(1)
1906–1907	Grimsby Town	34	(13)
1907	Reading		
1907–1908	Brighton & Hove Albion	15	(1)
1908–1909	Leeds City	25	(4)
- * Club domestic league appearances and goals

Thomas Rodger (9 June 1882 – after 1908) was a Scottish professional footballer who played as a winger in the Football League for Preston North End, Grimsby Town and Leeds City. He also played in the Southern League for Brighton & Hove Albion.
