= Tony Rogers =

Tony Rogers is the name of:

- Tony Rogers (athlete) (born 1957), New Zealand middle-distance runner
- Tony Rogers (director), Australian film director
- Tony Rogers, keyboard player for UK band The Charlatans

== See also ==
- Anthony Rogers (disambiguation)
