= Michael Rogers =

Michael Rogers may refer to:

== Politics and military ==
- Mike Rogers (Alabama politician) (born 1958), U.S. Representative from Alabama
- Mike Rogers (Maryland politician) (born 1964), state legislator
- Mike Rogers (Michigan politician) (born 1963), former U.S. Representative from Michigan
- Michael Rogers (Oklahoma politician) (born 1978), Oklahoma Secretary of State
- Michael S. Rogers (born 1959), director of the National Security Agency
- Michael Rogers (North Carolina politician) in North Carolina General Assembly of 1777
- F. Michael Rogers (1921–2014), U.S. Air Force general

== Sports ==
- Mike Rogers (ice hockey) (born 1954), Canadian hockey player
- Michael Rogers (cyclist) (born 1979), Australian professional road bicycle racer
- Michael Rogers (racing driver) in 2008 Australian Superkart season
- Mike Rogers (sailor) on List of World Championships medalists in sailing

== Other people ==
- Bela Matina, an actor credited as "Mike Rogers" in The Wizard of Oz (1939)
- Michael A. Rogers, author and futurist
- Michael Rogers (actor) (born 1970), Canadian television and film actor
- Michael Rogers (publisher) (born 1963), American publisher, fundraiser, gay rights leader, and former blogger
- Michael John Rogers (1932–2006), English ornithologist
- Michael Rogers, bass player in the band Peel
- Mike Rogers (Batman: Legends of the Dark Knight 44) on List of DC Comics characters: M
- Mike Rogers, actor in The Somme – From Defeat to Victory
- Mike Rogers (producer), radio DJ in Tokyo

== See also ==
- Michael Rodgers (disambiguation)
- Mick Rogers (disambiguation)
