= Margaret Rogers =

Margaret Rogers or Maggie Rogers may refer to:

- Margaret Rogers (nurse) (1875–1915), New Zealand WWI casualty
- Margaret Rogers (politician) (born 1949), American state legislator in Mississippi
- Maggie Rogers (born 1994), American performer
- Maggie Rogers (White House maid) (1874–1953), American staff member

== See also ==
- Margaret Rodgers (disambiguation)
