= Kevin Rodgers =

Kevin Rodgers may refer to:

- Kevin Rodgers, musician in Golden Shower (band)
- Kevin Rodgers, candidate in Doncaster Council election, 2010

== See also ==
- Kevin Rogers (disambiguation)
