= Thomas Rogers =

Thomas Rogers, Tom Rogers or Tommy Rogers may refer to:

== Arts and entertainment ==
- Thomas Rogers (writer) (1927–2007), American novelist
- Thomas D. Rogers (born 1945), American sculptor/engraver, designed Sacagawea dollar coin
- Thomas Rogers, fictional character in And Then There Were None, 1945 American film
- Tommy Giles Rogers Jr. (born 1980), American musician
- Tommy Rogers, a supporting character in 1956 musical drama film Rock, Rock, Rock!

== Politics ==
- Thomas J. Rogers (1781–1832), United States congressman from Pennsylvania
- Thomas Rogers (MP) (1735–1793), English banker and member of parliament

== Religion ==
- Thomas Rogers (priest) (died 1616), English Anglican clergyman, controversialist, and translator
- Thomas Rogers (deacon) (1806–1903), Anglican clergyman and campaigner for convict rights in Australia

== Sports ==
- Tom Rogers (footballer) (1885–?), English footballer
- Tom Rogers (baseball) (1892–1936), American baseball player
- Tom Rogers (American football, born 1902) (1902–1976), American college football player and coach at Denison University
- Tom Rogers (American football, born 1910) (1910–1990), American college football player and coach at Wake Forest University
- Tom Rogers (cricketer, born 1994), Australian cricketer
- Tom Rogers (cricketer, born 1999), Australian cricketer
- Tom Rogers (rugby union) (born 1998), Welsh rugby player
- Tommy Rogers (wrestler) (1961–2015), American professional wrestler Thomas Crouch
- Tom Rogers Jr. (born 1978), American stock car racing driver

== Others ==
- Thomas Rogers (Mayflower passenger) (died 1621), English passenger on the Mayflower
- Thomas Rogers (fl. 1657), American settler and founder of Old Orchard Beach, Maine
- Thomas Rogers (locomotive builder) (1792–1856), American mechanical engineer
- Thomas Edward Rogers (1912–1999), British diplomat
- Tom Rogers (executive), American television executive, president and CEO of TiVo
- Tom Rogers, Australian Electoral Commissioner since December 2014
- T. Gary Rogers (1942–2017), American entrepreneur and executive

== See also ==
- Thomas Rodgers (disambiguation)
