= Warren Rogers =

American journalist

Warren Joseph Rogers Jr. (May 6, 1922 – August 31, 2003) was a political reporter and an author. Born in New Orleans, Rogers took a liking to the press at an early age, working as a night messenger boy for the Postal Telegraph Co. and later as a copy boy for the New Orleans Item.

During World War II, Rogers served as a U.S. Marine and took part in the first offensive at Guadalcanal. He also served at Tulagi.

After returning home, Rogers work as a journalist with a New Orleans paper, but later joined the Associated Press and transferred to Baton Rouge to cover Louisiana politics.

In 1956, during the Adlai Stevenson campaign, Rogers first met Robert F. Kennedy, who was traveling with the press to prepare for his brother's 1960 presidential campaign. Despite the frequent arguments that they had with one another, Rogers and Kennedy became good friends as they sat on buses on Stevenson's campaign trail.

Rogers joined the Washington bureau of the New York Herald Tribune in 1959 and began reporting on the military, foreign affairs, the presidency, and national politics. During his time with the Herald Tribune, he was nominated for two Pulitzer Prizes: one for a series called "Our Man on the Bus" and one for a series of reporting on Green Beret combat in Vietnam, for which he made ten trips to that country. He also covered the Cuban Missile Crisis, the civil rights movement, the White House and the McCarthy hearings.

Rogers became bureau chief for the Hearst Corporation in 1963, and then was named Washington Editor for Look Magazine in 1966. In 1968, Rogers' friendship with Robert Kennedy allowed him an insider's view of Kennedy's campaign for the Democratic nomination. Rogers not only served as a reporter to the Kennedy campaign, but also as a near-staff member. Rogers was present during Kennedy's assassination on June 5, 1968, and even helped subdue the gunman, Sirhan Sirhan. In 1993, Rogers published a book called When I Think of Bobby: A Personal Memoir of the Kennedy Years (see below).

Warren Rogers died on August 31, 2003, from a perforated ulcer. He was 81 at the time of his death.

== Bibliography ==
- Sea Shepherd: My Fight for Whales and Seals (1981; ISBN 0-393-01499-1) by Paul Watson as told to Warren Rogers
- When I Think of Bobby: A Personal Memoir of the Kennedy Years (1993; ISBN 0-06-017042-5)

== Sources ==
- Eyewitness to History
- Blog of Death (Obituary)
- Warren Rogers Dies, Former NPC President (photo)
