= Richard Rodgers School =

Richard Rodgers School refers to several schools named after the American composer Richard Rodgers, including these two in New York City:

- PS 96 Richard Rodgers School, the Bronx
- PS 166 Richard Rodgers School of Arts & Technology, Manhattan
