= Richard Rogers (disambiguation) =

Richard Rogers (1933–2021) was a British architect.

Richard Rogers may also refer to:

- Richard Rogers (bishop) (1532/33–1597), British religious leader
- Richard Birdsall Rogers (1857–1927), Canadian civil & mechanical engineer
- Richard Reid Rogers (1867–1949), American jurist & military governor of Panama Canal Zone
- Richard Dean Rogers (1921–2016), American jurist and politician in the Kansas state legislature
- Richard Rogers (psychologist) (born 1950), American psychologist & academic
- Richard Rogers (sound engineer), American sound engineer
- Richard Rogers (died 1643) (c. 1611–1643), English soldier who sat in the House of Commons from 1640 to 1642
- Richard Rogers (theologian) (1550–1618), English nonconformist clergyman
- Dick Rogers (1912–1970), American jazz musician, composer, comedian
- Richard Saltonstall Rogers (1790–1873), East Indies merchant & Salem politician
- Richard Sanders Rogers (1861–1942), Australian medical doctor and authority on Australasian orchids
- Richard Rogers (serial killer) (born 1950), American serial killer

== See also ==
- Rick Rogers (born 1963), American college football player
- Richard Rodgers (disambiguation)
