= Brandon Rogers =

Brandon Rogers may refer to:

- Brandon Rogers (ice hockey) (born 1982), American ice hockey player
- Brandon Rogers (actor) (born 1988), American comedian, actor, and director
- Brandon Rogers, American contestant on American Idol (season 6)

== See also ==
- Brendan Rodgers (disambiguation)
