= David Rogers (footballer) =

English footballer

David Rogers (born 3 February 1892) was an English professional association footballer. He played for Swindon Town and Gillingham between 1920 and 1928, making nearly 200 appearances in the Football League.
