= Stephen Walter Rogers =

African-American preacher, activist, writer, and editorialist

Stephen Walter Rogers (1839–1872) was an African-American preacher, activist, writer, and editorialist. He was historically influential in Louisiana and Alabama; and was one of the people holding civil disobedience against the anti-education laws of the time.

== Biography ==
Stephen Walter Rogers was enslaved during his early life. Rogers was freed on May 18, 1852. While working as a valet in the area of Mobile, Alabama, Rogers taught fellow slaves to read in a carriage house loft.

He wrote about Abraham Lincoln, and published a book of hymns. He was a pastor at St. Thomas Church in New Orleans. Harper's Magazine described him as one of the most prominent pastors in New Orleans in 1866. Rogers was also the editor of The Black Republican, a Black newspaper based in New Orleans originating in 1865.
