= Wentworth Mansion =

- U.S. Historic district – Contributing property
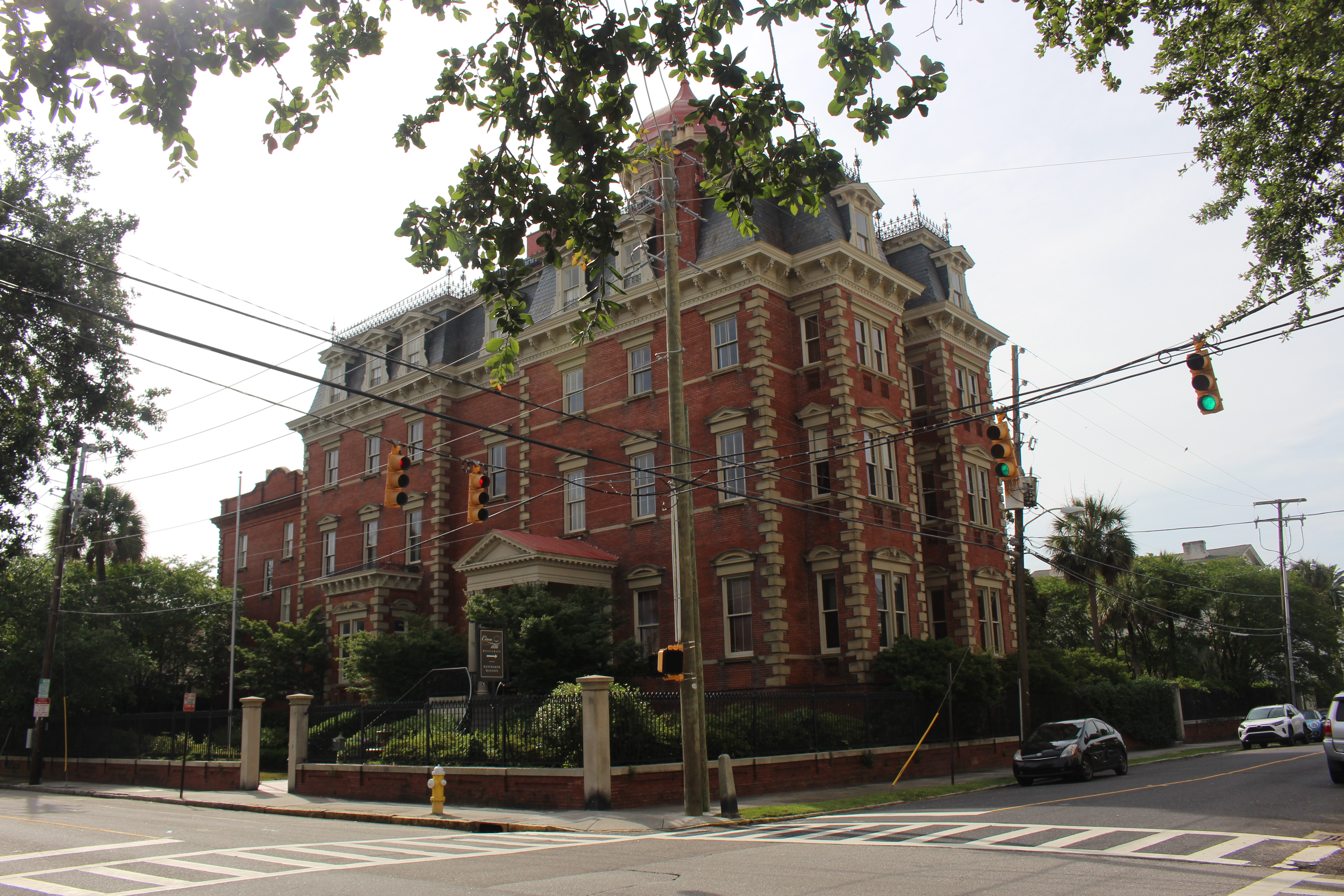

- Location within South Carolina Location within the United States
- Location: 149 Wentworth St., Charleston, South Carolina
- Coordinates: 32.77985°N 79.93990°W
- Architectural style: Second Empire
- Part of: Charleston Historic District (ID78002497)
- Designated CP: July 16, 1978

The Wentworth Mansion is a hotel in Charleston, South Carolina, United States.

It was built in 1886 as a home for cotton merchant Francis Silas Rodgers and his family. The mansion is Second Empire in style.

The Rodgers Mansion was purchased in 1920 for US$100,000 by the Scottish Rite Cathedral Association of Charleston, a Masonic organization. In 1922 it constructed an auditorium which could accommodate the organization's 600 members on the property, connected by a corridor to the mansion; the auditorium was removed some time later.

It is a contributing property in the Charleston Historic District. (Note: See sources at Charleston Historic District covering the large scope of that historic district. This site is in the core area, well south of the northern boundary, Bee St.)

It was listed as a member of Historic Hotels of America by the National Trust for Historic Preservation since 2003.
