= Mick Rogers =

Mick Rogers may refer to:

- Mick Rogers (wildlife warden) (1944–2003), warden of Portland Bird Observatory and Field Centre at Portland Bill, Dorset, England
- Mick Rogers (musician) (born 1946), English rock guitarist, singer and songwriter
- Michael Rogers (cyclist) (born 1979), Australian road racing cyclist

== See also ==
- Michael Rogers (disambiguation)
