= Tim Rogers =

Tim Rogers may refer to:

- Tim Rogers (American football) (born 1966), American football coach of the Kalamazoo Hornets
- Tim Rogers (writer) (born 1979), American video games journalist
- Tim Rogers (musician) (born 1969), Australian musician, frontman of You Am I

== See also ==
- Timothy Rogers (disambiguation)
