= Still Pending =

US musical group

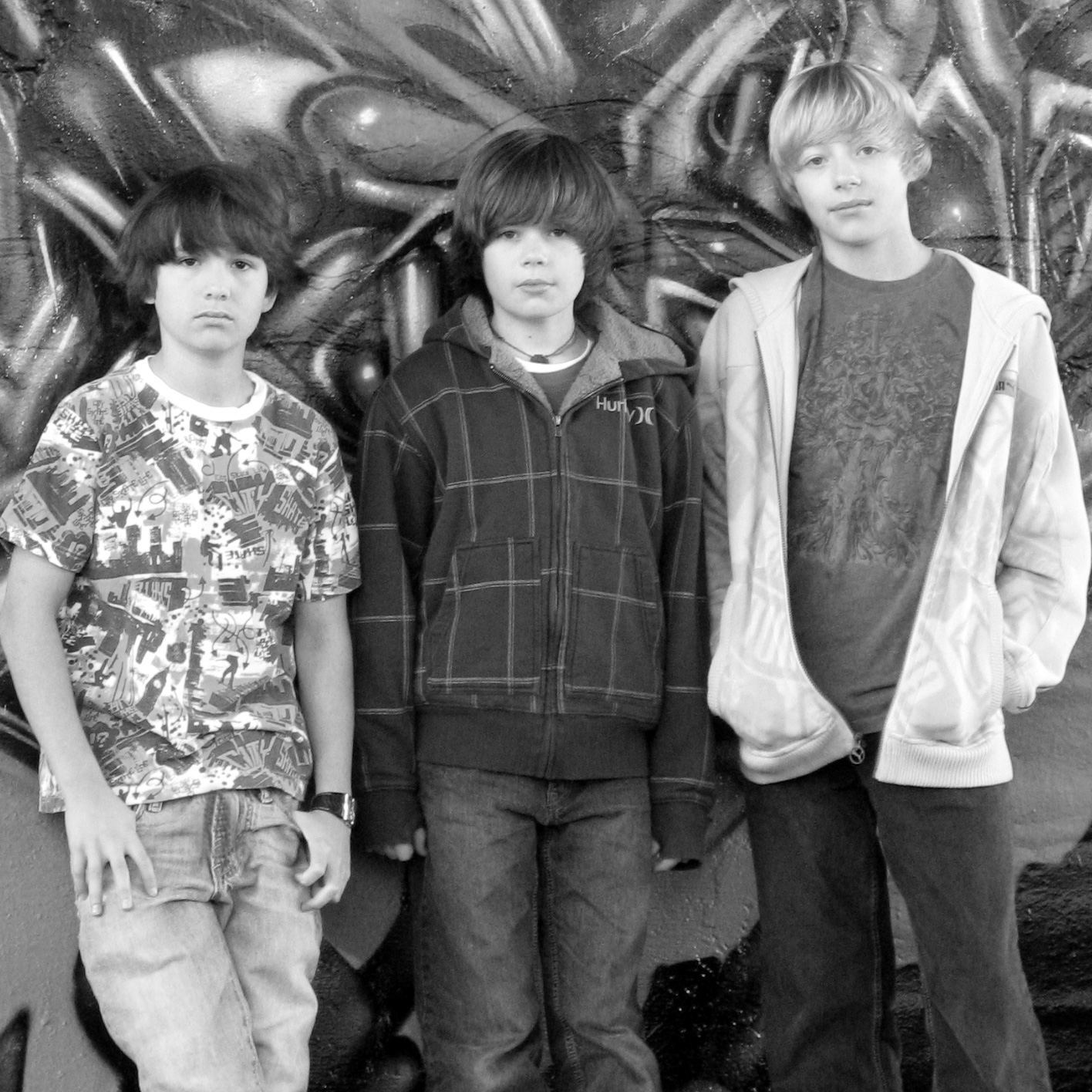
- Still Pending in November 2008, from left to right: Reed Gulick-Stutz, Grant Ellman, and Andrew Turel

Background information
- Origin: Portland, Oregon, United States
- Genres: Rock; Alternative rock Punk rock
- Years active: 2005–2010
- Labels: Unsigned
- Members: Reed Gulick-Stutz (guitar, lead vocals); Grant Ellman (drums, vocals); Ian Rogers (bassist, until 2007); Andrew Turel (bassist, from 2007)
- Website: http://stillpending.com

Still Pending was an American punk children band, formed in Portland, Oregon, United States, in 2005. The band originally comprising three young musicians, Reed Gulick-Stutz (guitar and vocals), Grant Ellman (drums and vocals), and Ian Rogers (bass guitar). In June 2007, Rogers left the band and was replaced by Andrew Turel in August 2007. It is rumored that the band broke up due to drummer and vocalist Grant Ellman embarking on a Jamaican Patois vocalism and lyric training course, leaving little time for him to perform his band duties because of the intense training schedule. The official website is currently down, and their social media is inactive currently.

== Band history ==
=== Formation of the band ===
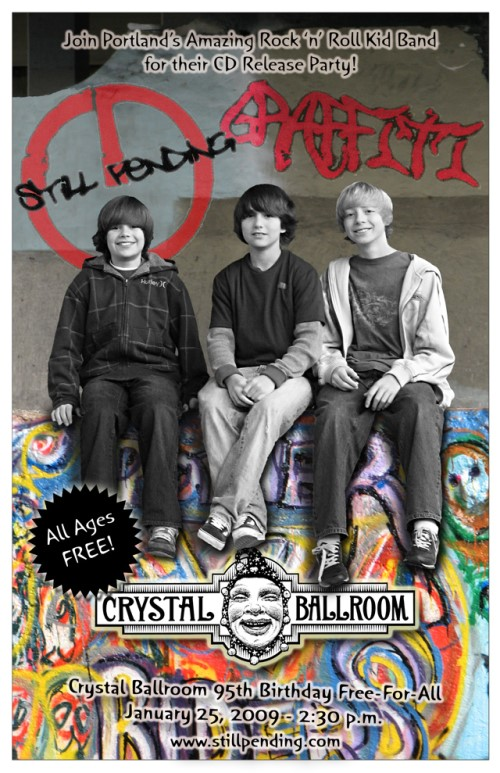
A promotional poster from a January, 2009 performance at the Crystal Ballroom (Portland, Oregon)

Still Pending was formed by a group of classmates in the fall of 2005.

=== The Break and Debut CD ===
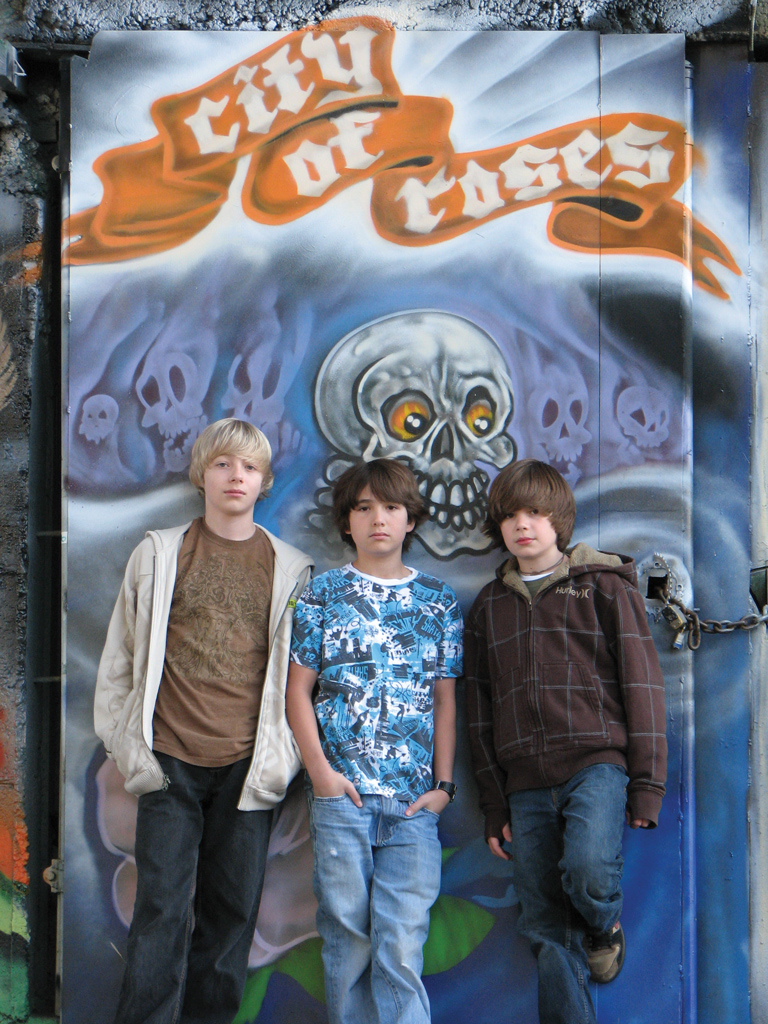
(Left/right) Andrew Turel, Reed Gulick-Stutz and Grant Ellman in Portland, Oregon, November 2008

Shortly thereafter, the band got its first break as the on-stage band in the Oregon Children's Theatre rock musical production, Alexander, Who is Not, Not, Not, Not, Not, Not Going to Move.

In September 2006, the band released its first EP-length CD entitled, Innocent Days. The CD is made up entirely of original material and was recorded by themselves. On the CD, the band showcases its typical punk pop style. All three musicians take part in crafting the music. It features the bass lines by Ian, bassist at the time of the recording.

=== Exposure ===
In the fall 2006, Still Pending entered into a national talent search conducted by the Cartoon Network for its Props TV show.

In January 2007, NAMM, the International Music Products Association, selected Still Pending to promote their "Wanna Play?" initiative. The band is featured on the celebrity endorsers page of NAMM's website along with other musical celebrities including Jim Messina and Michelle Branch.

== Discography ==
=== Studio albums ===
- Innocent Days (September 2006)
- Graffiti (January 2009)
