= Jane Rogers =

Jane Rogers may refer to:

- Jane Rogers (novelist) (born 1952), British novelist and scriptwriter
- Jane Rogers (actress, died 1718), English stage actress
- Jane Rogers (actress, died 1739), her daughter, English stage actress
- Jane A. Rogers (born 1960), American actress
- Jane Margaret Rogers, High Sheriff of Kent
