= Michael Rodgers =

Michael Rodgers may refer to:

- Mike Rodgers (born 1985), American track and field athlete
- Michael E. Rodgers (born 1969), British actor
- Michael Rodgers (singer) on Steve Lukather discography
- Michael Rodgers (art historian), Slade Professor of Fine Art

== See also ==
- Michael Rogers (disambiguation)
