= Don Rogers =

Don Rogers may refer to:

- Don Rogers (footballer) (born 1945), English footballer
- Don Rogers (offensive lineman) (born 1936), American football offensive lineman
- Don Rogers (politician) (1928–2018), American politician in the state of California
- Don Rogers (safety) (1962–1986), American football safety
