= Norman Rogers =

Norman Rogers may refer to:

- The real name of DJ Terminator X (born 1967)
- Norman McLeod Rogers (1894–1940), member of the Cabinet of Canadian Prime Minister William Lyon Mackenzie King
- Norm Rogers (Australian rules footballer) (born 1937), East Fremantle defender
- Norm Rogers (rugby league), Eastern Suburbs centre
