= Richard Rodgers Award =

Richard Rodgers Award may refer to:

- The ASCAP Foundation Richard Rodgers Award
- The ASCAP Foundation Richard Rodgers New Horizons Award
- The Richard Rodgers Award for Excellence in Musical Theater, presented by the Pittsburgh Civic Light Opera and established in 1988
- The Richard Rodgers Award for Musical Theatre, presented by the American Academy of Arts and Letters, created and endowed in 1978 by Richard Rodgers
