= Trevor Rogers =

Trevor Rogers may refer to:

- Trevor Rogers (baseball) (born 1997), American baseball pitcher
- Trevor Rogers (politician) (born 1943), New Zealand politician
