= Carlos Rogers =

Carlos Rogers may refer to:

- Carlos Rogers (American football) (b. 1981), American former professional football player
- Carlos Rogers (basketball) (b. 1971), American former professional basketball player
