= Christabella Rogers =

English poet and author

Christabella Rogers (1618? – ?) was a 17th-century English poet and author of an untitled song addressed to Cupid.

== Biography ==
Records indicate the christening of a "Christobel Rogers" in Shropshire, England, in the year 1618. That this Rogers is the poet Rogers is not certain, however. Other than this, very little is known about Rogers. As Alison Shell states in Early Modern Women’s Manuscript Writing: "Christobella Rogers and Alice Fennel [her cousin], remain for the moment as obscure as most early modern women."

Shell identifies Rogers and her cousin Fennel as part of a writers' circle centring on the Feilding family, "one of the most prominent aristocratic dynasties in seventeenth-century England". In a letter addressed to "Lady" Christabella Rogers, a "Frances Feilding" (herself an ambiguous figure) praises Rogers’ skill, writing, "then talke not of ben jonson skill / nor yet of homers soaring quill". This letter not only tells us that Rogers was a member of the aristocracy ("Lady") but also suggests a greater body of work than the meagre writings we have today. Indeed, though very little of her work survives today, Rogers was apparently author of "substantial quantities of verse." With what little knowledge we have, then, we can place Rogers in an aristocratic literary community in the mid-seventeenth century.
