= Rodgerson =

Rodgerson is a surname. Notable people with the surname include:

- Eva Rodgerson (born 1945), Canadian politician
- Ian Rodgerson (born 1966), English footballer
- Ralph Rodgerson (1892–1939), English footballer
- Stan Rodgerson (1894–1955), Australian rules footballer

== See also ==
- Rogerson
