= Jimmy Rodgers (footballer) =

Australian rules footballer

Personal information
- Full name: James Arthur Rodgers
- Born: 13 July 1897; Yarram, Victoria
- Died: 27 November 1973 (aged 76); Wattle Glen, Victoria
- Original team: State Savings Bank / Melbourne District
- Height: 179 cm (5 ft 10 in)
- Weight: 70 kg (154 lb)

Playing career^{1}
Years	Club	Games (Goals)
1921	South Melbourne	11 (1)
1923	Geelong	6 (0)
Total		17 (1)
- ^{1} Playing statistics correct to the end of 1923.

James Arthur Rodgers (13 July 1897 – 27 November 1973) was an Australian rules footballer who played with South Melbourne and Geelong in the Victorian Football League (VFL). Rodgers also played for State Savings Bank in a 1923 Victorian Banks Football Association (VBFA) final.
