= Dave Rogers (Australian footballer) =

Australian rules footballer

Personal information
- Full name: David Wallace Rogers
- Born: 27 March 1942
- Died: 6 October 2000 (aged 58)
- Original team: East Coburg
- Height: 182 cm (6 ft 0 in)
- Weight: 76 kg (168 lb)

Playing career^{1}
| Years | Club | Games (Goals) |
| 1963–64 | Carlton | 7 (1) |
| 1965–66 | North Melbourne | 9 (2) |
| Total | | 16 (3) |
- ^{1} Playing statistics correct to the end of 1966.

Dave Rogers (27 March 1942 – 6 October 2000) was an Australian rules footballer who played with Carlton and North Melbourne in the Victorian Football League (VFL).
