= Rogerson =

Rogerson is a surname. Notable people with the surname:

- Andrew Peter Rogerson (born 1985 Melbourne) Captain CFA
- Adam Rogerson (born 1984), American soldier, one of twelve deputed to guard Saddam Hussein when captured
- Barnaby Rogerson (born 1960), British author, television presenter, and publisher
- Barry Rogerson (born 1936), British bishop
- Clark Thomas Rogerson (1918–2001), American mycologist
- Craig Rogerson (born 1965), Australian diver
- Cynthia Rogerson (born 1953), American writer
- Dan Rogerson (born 1975), British Liberal Democrat politician, (MP for North Cornwall, UK)
- George Rogerson (1896–1961), English cricketer
- Iain Rogerson (1960–2017), British actor
- Isabella Whiteford Rogerson (1835–1905), Irish-Newfoundland poet
- James Johnstone Rogerson (1820–1907), Newfoundland businessman and philanthropist
- John Rogerson (disambiguation), several people
- Logan Rogerson (born 1998), New Zealand footballer
- Nicole Rogerson (born 1974), Australian director and CEO of Autism Awareness Australia
- Philip Rogerson (born 1945), British businessman
- Phoenicia Rogerson (born 1996), British author
- Pippa Rogerson, British solicitor and academic
- Ralph Rogerson (born 1937), former Australian rules footballer
- Richard Rogerson (fl. 1970s–2020s), American economist
- Robert Rogerson, American industrialist
- Roger Rogerson (1941–2024), Australian criminal and former police officer
- Ron Rogerson (1943–1987), American football coach
- Sean Rogerson (born 1977), Canadian actor and former photomodel
- Sydney Rogerson (1915–1993), British army staff sergeant
- Simon Rogerson (fl. 1980s–2020s), Europe's first Professor of Computer Ethics
- Tim Rogerson, American painter
- Tom Rogerson, British musician
- Wallace M. Rogerson (1880–1943), American exercise leader
- William Rogerson (1860–1939), Newfoundland politician

== See also ==
- Rogerson, Idaho, an unincorporated community in Twin Falls County, Idaho, United States
- Sir John Rogerson's Quay, a street and quay in Dublin (named after Sir John Rogerson)
- Royscot Trust Ltd v Rogerson, an English contract law
- Rogerson River, river in New Zealand
- Rogerson's Village Historic District, a mill village in Massachusetts
- John Rogerson Montgomery House, residence in Illinois
- Rodgerson, a surname
