= James O. Rodgers (author) =

- Born: Georgia, US
- Education: University of Alabama at Birmingham
- Occupation: Writer
- Writing career
- Genre: Race relations
- Website: thediversitycoach.com

James O. Rodgers is an American writer and a proponent of diverse workplaces. He has published over 100 articles and written a book on the subject. With Edgar Schein and other leaders of the field, James promotes the principles of diversity management as a strategy to improve overall business performance at conferences. Recruiter.com's Managing Editor, Matthiew Kosinski, calls Rodgers's philosophy "dramatically different" because it "emphasizes diversity of perspective, rather than more superficial characteristics."
