= Stanley R. H. Rogers =

American writer, illustrator, and historian

Stanley Rogers
- Born: Stanley Reginald Harry Rogers; 7 May 1887; Nottingham, England
- Died: 21 January 1961 (aged 73); Bronxville, New York, US
- Education: Goldsmiths' College; Royal Academy of Fine Arts
- Occupations: Writer, illustrator, historian
- Spouse: Franke Woodhouse Rogers
- Children: 1
- Writing career
- Period: fl. 1920–1960
- Subjects: Maritime history, naval history, shipbuilding, shipwrecks

Stanley Reginald Harry Rogers (7 May 1887 – 21 January 1961) was a British and American writer, illustrator, and maritime historian. Born in Nottingham, raised in Washington, and educated in London, he was based in London and New York during his career.

== Biography ==
Born in Nottingham, England, his family emigrated to the United States in August 1888, and settled in Olympia, Washington.

He studied art at Goldsmiths' College in London before World War I, where he met his future wife: children's books illustrator Franke Rogers (née Woodhouse). Franke illustrated over 50 children's books, including the popular Robin Family series, which she also wrote. She was also the illustrator of the "Mr. Papingay" books written by Marion St. John Webb, who was a close personal friend from Goldsmiths'. Their son Cedric became an author of many popular geology books.

Rogers wrote and illustrated over 50 books for children and adults between 1920 and 1960. These included Sea Lore, The Atlantic, The Indian Ocean, Enchanted Isles, Gallant Deeds of the War, Hazards of War, Barenetha Rock, and Hazards of the Deep.

The family lived in London for more than 30 years before moving back to New York City after World War II. Toward the end of his life he lived in Yonkers, New York. Rogers died on 21 January 1961, in nearby Bronxville.
