= David J. Rodger =

David J. Rodger (30 August 1970, Newcastle Upon Tyne – 22 November 2015, Bristol) was a British author and game designer best known for his novels set in a near-future world of corporate and political intrigue. He published nine novels, all set in the same universe, both before and after an apocalyptic event. Oakfield, God Seed, Dante’s Fool, Iron Man Project, Iron Man Project, Edge, and Living in Flames, are all near-future supernatural thrillers, while Dog Eat Dog, The Black Lake, and The Social Club, are based in the world of Yellow Dawn, a role-playing game set in the same future world ten years after it has been devastated by a terrible mutagenic virus.

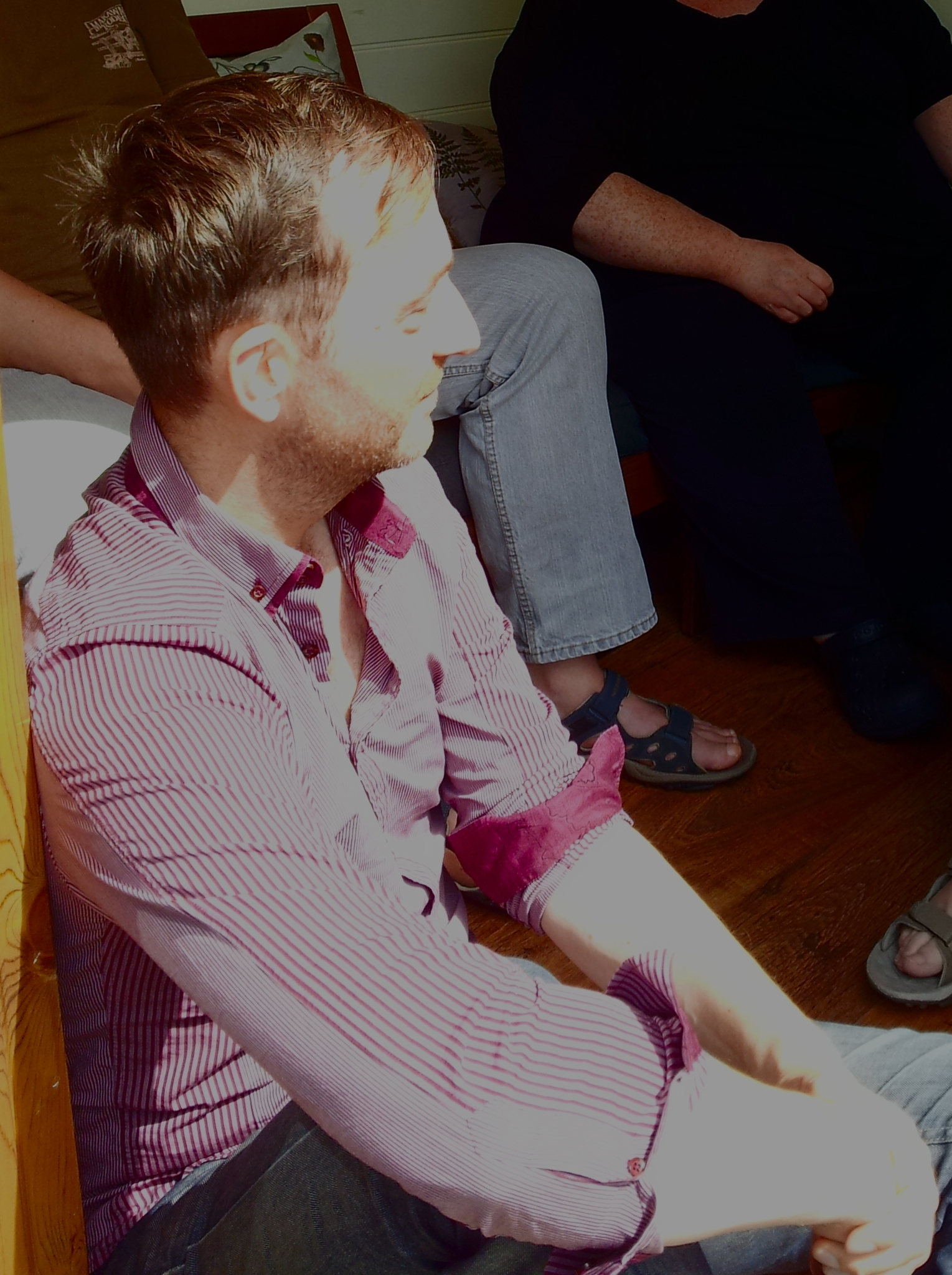
David J. Rodger, British author and game designer

Rodger's novels combined high-tech intrigue and political/corporate machinations with elements of the Cthulhu Mythos, as created by H.P. Lovecraft. Rodger's contributions to the Mythos include the creation of several new Great Old Ones in his novels Edge, Dog Eat Dog and Living in Flames and the use of the Outer God Nyarlathotep in the novel God Seed. In Yellow Dawn, his interpretation of the Mythos, in particular the Great Old One Hastur, is a major part of the background material. He published Shadows of the Quantinex, a large-scale campaign expansion for the Yellow Dawn game, and released a 2.5 Edition update to the basic game in 2013. At the time of his death in 2015, Rodger completed a third edition of the game, bringing it in line with the latest edition of the Call of Cthulhu rules system, to be published through Modiphius Entertainment. He also wrote Cloudy Head, a children's story illustrated by Kenn-Ole Moen, and Murder at Sharky Point, a murder mystery game.

Rodger started writing at the age of 19. He spent 8 years working for the Environment Agency (non-departmental government agency), developing a virtual communications service within the IT Division, before moving into commercial project management for a major UK publisher. In 2000, Rodger's presence on the Internet got him a place in the BBC documentary, Through The Eyes of the Young, directed by Chris Terrill.

== Death ==
Rodger died at his home in Bristol on 22 November 2015, aged 45, after a short illness. Rodger is survived by his sister and his longtime girlfriend.

== Bibliography ==
=== Novels ===
- God Seed (1996)
- Dante's Fool (1999)
- Iron Man Project (2005)
- Edge (2008)
- Dog Eat Dog (2010)
- Living in Flames (2012)
- The Black Lake (2012)
- The Social Club (2013)
- Oakfield (2015)

=== Collections ===
- Songs of Spheres (2012)

=== Anthologies ===
- Achtung! Cthulhu: Dark Tales of the Secret War, edited by John Houlihan (Modiphius, 2015)

=== Games ===
- Yellow Dawn 1st Edition (2006)
- Murder at Sharky Point (2007)
- Yellow Dawn 2nd Edition (2008)
- Shadows of the Quantinex (2009)
- Yellow Dawn 2.5 Edition (2012)

=== Children's Stories ===
- Cloudy Head (Illustrated, 2007)

=== Scripts ===
- Salo IV (2007)
