= Dave Rogers (crew chief) =

American NASCAR crew chief (born 1974)

- Rogers in 2009

Personal information
- Born: David B. Rogers; March 12, 1974 (age 52) Marshfield, Vermont, U.S.

Sport
- Country: United States
- Sport: NASCAR Cup Series
- Team: 23XI Racing

David B. Rogers (born March 12, 1974) is an American NASCAR crew chief who works as the performance director for 23XI Racing. He previously worked as a crew chief for Joe Gibbs Racing in both the NASCAR Cup and Xfinity Series as well as the technical director for JGR's Xfinity operations. He has over a decade of experience as a crew chief, all with JGR. Over the course of his career, he has worked in the NASCAR Cup Series and Xfinity Series with drivers Jason Leffler, Denny Hamlin, Aric Almirola, Tony Stewart, Travis Kittleson, J. J. Yeley, Kyle Busch, Joey Logano, Brad Coleman, Matt DiBenedetto, Michael McDowell, Carl Edwards, Daniel Suárez, Matt Tifft, Kyle Benjamin, Riley Herbst, and Daniel Hemric. Hemric and Rogers won the 2021 NASCAR Xfinity Series championship.

== Career ==
=== 1998–2005: Stewart's engineer and Leffler's crew chief ===
After graduating from Clarkson University with a bachelor's degree in mechanical engineering and a master's from Kettering University in vehicle dynamics, Rogers was quickly hired by Joe Gibbs Racing and began working there on July 1, 1998. For the rest of the year, he worked in the team's shop before starting as race engineer in 1999 for Tony Stewart's No. 20 team under crew chief Greg Zipadelli. Success on that team earned him the crew chief position on the No. 11 Sprint Cup team with driver Jason Leffler in 2005 when JGR expanded to three cars full time in the Cup Series. However, after the team had major struggles, failing to perform as good as the other two of the Gibbs cars (including a DNQ at the Coca-Cola 600), Rogers was replaced by Mike Ford as Leffler's crew chief.

=== 2006–2009: Busch/Nationwide Series ===
In 2006, Rogers became the crew chief of the No. 20 Busch Series team for JGR, replacing Cully Barraclough, who moved to Michael Waltrip Racing. Working with Denny Hamlin, they finished fourth in points, earning six poles (the most of any team that year), and two wins.

Rogers continued as the No. 20 crew chief in 2007, with Hamlin scaling back and sharing the ride with developmental driver Aric Almirola. That year was a notable one for the team when the team won the race at Milwaukee when Hamlin, who was originally scheduled to drive that weekend, was late to arrive to the track from Sonoma Raceway in California, where the Cup race was that weekend. Almirola had practiced and qualified the car for Hamlin the rest of the weekend, and started the race before the team ordered him out in favor of Hamlin at the request of sponsor Rockwell Automation. Hamlin would charge back through the field and go on to win the race. Almirola had won the pole and lead a good part of the race before being replaced. Because Almirola started the race in the No. 20, he was credited with the win although Hamlin drove the car across the finish line first and was the one celebrating in victory lane. Rogers and Hamlin would win three additional races in 2007 at Darlington, Michigan, and Dover in September.

In 2008, the No. 20 car was split between Tony Stewart, Hamlin, Kyle Busch (who joined JGR from Hendrick Motorsports), and rookie Joey Logano once he turned 18 in May of that year. Working with all four drivers, Rogers won at least one race with each of them. Stewart won five races at Daytona, Fontana, Talladega, Darlington, and New Hampshire. Kyle Busch won one race in the No. 20 at Mexico City, which was his third win in a row after having driven the JGR No. 18 to victories in the previous two races. Hamlin won driving the No. 20 at Richmond in May and Daytona in July. Logano's one win came at Kentucky. The No. 20 car won the owners' championship that year.

Rogers returned to crew chief the No. 20 for the fourth year in a row in 2009. Logano drove the car primarily throughout the year, with Hamlin and Brad Coleman also driving in some races. Kyle Busch only drove the No. 18 that year, and Stewart left JGR after 2008, so he did not return either. Logano scored five wins for the No. 20 team in 2009.

=== 2009–2017: Back to Cup ===
Rogers started to crew chief for Kyle Busch in the No. 18 car late in the 2009 season after Busch missed the Chase for the Sprint Cup. He replaced Steve Addington, who was released from the team and ended up at Penske Racing the following year.

In 2010, Rogers' first full season with Busch, they finished 8th in points. Rogers is known to be a conservative crew chief, usually taking four tires late in races and not gambling on fuel mileage. Rogers has played a large role in the maturation of his former rowdy and controversial driver Busch. Rogers has 13 wins in the NASCAR Sprint Cup Series as Busch's crew chief. Rogers served as the crew chief for Busch through the 2014 season. In 2015, Rogers became the crew chief for Denny Hamlin in the No. 11 team, winning two races with Hamlin. In 2016, Rogers moved over to the No. 19 team with Carl Edwards, winning three races and a near Championship. After 2016, Edwards stepped down as the driver of the No. 19 car.

After Edwards' retirement, Rogers was replaced by Daniel Suárez in the No. 19, and Rogers worked with him to start the year. On March 29, 2017, it was announced that Rogers would be taking an indefinite personal leave of absence, with Scott Graves, who had won the Xfinity Series title with Suárez the prior year, would serve as crew chief of the No. 19 team.

=== 2017–2021: Back to Xfinity ===
On June 19, JGR announced that Rogers had returned from his leave of absence, but instead of returning as the crew chief for the No. 19, would become the technical director for JGR's Xfinity Series teams. Later that year, he was the interim crew chief for JGR's No. 19 Xfinity team driven by Matt Tifft at Kansas when Matt Beckman served a one-race suspension.

On October 9, during the 2018 season, Rogers returned as interim crew chief of Suárez's No. 19 driven Cup car for the last six races of the season, replacing Scott Graves who parted ways with JGR to later join Roush Fenway Racing as the crew chief of the No. 6 car of Ryan Newman in 2019. Rogers also served as an interim crew chief for the No. 18 JGR Xfinity team earlier that year for one race at Iowa in July when Eric Phillips was suspended.

After two and a half years in his technical director position, Rogers returned to crew chiefing full-time when JGR announced on November 7, 2019, that he would work with Riley Herbst in his first full time Xfinity season.

=== 2022: 23XI Racing ===
On November 16, 2021, Rogers announced that he would move from JGR to 23XI Racing in the Cup Series as performance director in 2022.

On March 29, 2022, Rogers was announced as the crew chief of the No. 23 for Richmond, Martinsville, Bristol, and Talladega after Bootie Barker was suspended for four races due to a tire and wheel loss during the 2022 Texas Grand Prix at COTA.
