= Benjamin Rogers =

Benjamin or Ben Rogers may refer to:

- Benjamin Rogers (musician) (1614–1698), English organist and composer
- Benjamin Rogers (politician, born 1836) (1836–1911), merchant and politician in Prince Edward Island
- Benjamin Rogers (politician, born 1837) (1837–1923), former lieutenant governor of Prince Edward Island
- Benjamin Bickley Rogers (1828–1919), English classical scholar
- Benjamin Tingley Rogers (1865–1918), founder of the BC Sugar Refining Company
- Ben Rogers (rugby league) (born 1985), Australian rugby league player
- Benedict Rogers, British human rights activist
- Ben Rogers (Days of Our Lives), character from the American soap opera Days of Our Lives
