= Les Rogers (footballer) =

Australian rules footballer

Personal information
- Full name: Leslie Joseph Rogers
- Born: 25 June 1896; Footscray, Victoria
- Died: 4 August 1916 (aged 20); Pozières, France
- Original team: Yarraville

Playing career^{1}
Years	Club	Games (Goals)
1915	Essendon	3 (0)
- ^{1} Playing statistics correct to the end of 1915.

Leslie Joseph Rogers (25 June 1896 – 4 August 1916, born Leslie Joseph Collins) was an Australian rules footballer who played with Essendon in the Victorian Football League (VFL).

Rogers, a wingman, came from Yarraville originally and played only three games at Essendon before joining the Army.

As a Private, Rogers fought on the Western Front with the 23rd Battalion and was killed in action.

== See also ==
- List of Victorian Football League players who died on active service
