= Brendan Rodgers (disambiguation) =

Brendan Rodgers (born 1973) is a Northern Irish professional football manager and former player.

Brendan Rodgers or Brendan Rogers may also refer to:

- Brendan Rodgers (baseball) (born 1996), American baseball player
- Brendan Rogers (Canadian football) (born 1968), Canadian football player
- Brendan Rogers (dual player) (born 1994), hurling and Gaelic football player

== See also ==
- Brandon Rogers (disambiguation)
