= Jean Barrett (novelist) =

American writer

Bob Rogers
- Born: Robert Rogers
- Occupation: Novelist
- Spouse: Laura
- Writing career
- Pen name: Lee Rogers, Jean Barrett, Jean Thomas, Jeanie Thomas
- Period: 1979–present
- Genre: romance
- Website: www.jeanbarrett-author.com

Robert "Bob" Rogers is an American writer of over 24 romance novels under the female pennames Lee Rogers, Jean Barrett, Jean Thomas, and Jeanie Thomas since 1979.

== Biography ==
Robert "Bob" Rogers lives with his wife Laura near along the shore of Lake Michigan in Wisconsin, U.S. He published romance novels since 1979 under female pennames Lee Rogers, Jean Barrett, and Jean Thomas at different publishers: Harlequin-Silhouette, Kensington, Berkley and Dorchester.

== Bibliography ==
=== As Lee Rogers ===
- All These Splendid Sins (1979)

=== As Jean Barrett ===
==== Single novels ====
- Fire Bird (1985)
- Hot On Her Trail (1990)
- Heat (1991)
- A Ring of Gold (1992)
- Held Hostage (1992)
- White Wedding (1995)
- Fugitive Father (1998)
- My Lover's Secret (1999)
- Not Without You (2011)

==== Crossing Series ====
1. Delaney's Crossing (1997)
2. Archer's Crossing (1999)
3. McAllister's Crossing (2001)

==== Hawke Family ====
1. The Hunt for Hawke's Daughter (2001)
2. Private Investigations (2002)
3. Official Escort (2002)
4. Cowboy PI (2003)
5. Sudden Recall (2004)

==== Who is this Woman of Mystery? Multiauthor series ====
9. The Shelter of Her Arms (1994)

==== Mail Order Brides Multiauthor series ====
- Man of the Midnight Sun (1996)

==== Top Secret Babies Multiauthor series ====
3. The Hunt for Hawke's Daughter (2001)
12. Paternity Unknown (2005)

==== Eclipse Multiauthor series ====
- The Legacy of Croft Castle (2004)
- To the Rescue (2006)

==== Dead Bolt Multiauthor series ====
- Sudden Recall (2004)

==== Omnibus in collaboration ====
- Stolen Bride / Sudden Recall (2004) (with Jacqueline Diamond)
- Legacy of Croft Castle / Hijacked Honeymoon (2005) (with Susan Kearney)
- Police Business / Paternity Unknown (2005) (with Julie Miller)

=== As Jean Thomas ===
- AWOL with the Operative (2012)
