= Jack Rogers =

Jack Rogers may refer to:

- Jack Rogers (English footballer) (1895–1977), English footballer
- Jack Rogers (Australian footballer) (1913–1997), Australian rules footballer
- Jack D. Rogers (1919–2002), American professor of business management at University of California, Berkeley
- Jack Rogers (minister) (1934–2016), American theologian and Presbyterian moderator
- Jack Rogers (politician) (born 1937), American politician in South Carolina
- Jack Rogers (retailer), footwear retailer
- Jack Rogers (businessman), American businessman
- Jack Rogers (cricketer) (born 1998), English cricketer

== See also ==
- John Rogers (disambiguation)
