= John Rogers =

John Rogers may refer to:

== Arts and entertainment ==
- John Rogers (sculptor) (1829–1904), American sculptor
- John Rogers (actor) (1888–1963) British actor
- John Rogers (writer) (fl. 1996– ), American screenwriter, comics writer, film producer

== Business and industry ==
- John Rogers (businessman) (c. 1961–2018), Canadian-born American businessman and executive
- John F. W. Rogers (born 1956), American businessman; Goldman Sachs partner
- John W. Rogers Jr. (born 1958), American businessman and investor

== Law and politics ==
=== United Kingdom ===
- John Rogers (died 1565) (before 1507–1565), English MP for Dorset
- John Rogers II (died 1611/12), MP for Canterbury
- Sir John Rogers, 1st Baronet (1649–1710), English MP for Plymouth 1698–1700
- Sir John Rogers, 2nd Baronet (1676–1744), British MP for Plymouth 1713–1722
- Sir John Rogers, 3rd Baronet (1708–1773), British MP for Plymouth 1739–1740
- Sir John Rogers, 6th Baronet (1780–1847), British MP for Callington
- John Rogers (1750–1832), British MP for West Looe, Penryn and Helston
- John Jope Rogers (1816–1880), British barrister, author and MP for Helston

=== United States ===
- John Rogers (speaker) (1653–1707), politician from Rhode Island
- John Rogers (Continental Congress) (1723–1789), delegate to Continental Congress
- John Rogers (Cherokee chief) (1779–1846), last elected Principal Chief of the Cherokee Nation West
- John Sill Rogers (1796–1860), American politician
- John Rogers (New York politician) (1813–1879), US Congressman from New York
- John Rankin Rogers (1838–1901), Governor of Washington
- John Henry Rogers (1845–1911), US Representative and judge from Arkansas
- John G. Rogers (1849–1926), American judge and politician
- John Jacob Rogers (1881–1925), Massachusetts Congressman
- John W. Rogers Sr. (1918–2014), American attorney, judge, and military aviator
- John Rogers (Alabama politician) (born 1940), Alabama State Representative
- John M. Rogers (born 1948), US federal judge on the Court of Appeals for the Sixth Circuit
- John C. Rogers (born 1960), US Defense Department deputy
- John H. Rogers (born 1964), Massachusetts state representative
- John Rogers (Ohio politician) (fl. 2012– ), Ohio state representative

=== Elsewhere ===
- John Warrington Rogers (1822–1906), MP and judge in Tasmania, Australia
- John Rogers (Australian politician) (1842–1908)
- John Rogers (Barbadian politician), Senator of Barbados
- John Rogers (Irish lawyer) (born 1947), Attorney General of Ireland, 1984–1987

== Religion ==
- John Rogers (Bible editor and martyr) (c. 1500–1555), English clergyman; editor and translator of the Matthew Bible
- John Rogers (died 1636), English Puritan lecturer of Dedham, Essex
- John Rogers (Fifth Monarchist) (1627–?), English minister and physician
- John Rogers (Harvard) (1630–1684), English Puritan minister and president of Harvard University
- John Rogers (archdeacon of Leicester) (1648–1715), Anglican priest in England
- John Rogers (priest, born 1679) (1679–1729), English controversialist
- John Rogers (divine) (1778–1856), English clergyman and writer
- John Rogers (dean of Llandaff) (1934–2023), Dean of Llandaff Cathedral in Wales

== Sports ==
=== Cricket ===
- John Rogers (cricketer, born 1858) (1858–1935), Australian cricketer for Victoria
- John Rogers (cricketer, born 1860) (1860–?), English cricketer for Middlesex
- John Rogers (cricketer, born 1910) (1910–1968), English first-class cricketer
- John Rogers (cricketer, born 1943), Australian cricketer for New South Wales, see Chris Rogers
- John Rogers (cricketer, born 1987), Australian cricketer for Tasmania, Western Australia

=== Other sports ===
- John Rogers (baseball) (1844–1910), American baseball executive; owner of the Philadelphia Phillies
- John Rogers (rugby union) (1867–1922), England international rugby union player
- John T. Rogers (coach) (fl. 1899–1900), American football and basketball coach at Temple University
- John W. Rogers (horse trainer) (1852–1908), American Thoroughbred horse trainer
- John Rogers (ice hockey, born 1910) (1910–?), British ice hockey player
- John Rogers (American football center) (1910–1968), American football player
- John Rogers (rower) (1930–2016), Australian Olympic rower
- John Rogers (footballer) (born 1950), English footballer
- John Rogers (ice hockey, born 1953), Canadian ice hockey player

== Others ==
- John Rogers (academic) (1651–1703), English academic
- John Rogers (Albemarle County, Virginia) (died 1838), American agriculturalist; overseer of three plantations
- John Rogers (naturalist) (1807–1867), English barrister and gardener
- John Haney Rogers (1822–1906), American pioneer in the California Gold Rush
- John T. Rogers (journalist) (1881–1937), American journalist for the St. Louis Post-Dispatch
- John Rogers (RAF officer) (1928–2021), British air marshal
- John Daniel Rogers (born 1954), American curator of archaeology at the National Museum of Natural History
- John David Rogers (1895–1978), Australian Army Director of Military Intelligence during the Second World War
- John A. Rogers (born 1967), American physical chemist at Northwestern University

== See also ==
- Johnny Rogers (disambiguation)
- John Rodgers (disambiguation)
- Jon Rogers (disambiguation)
- John Roger (disambiguation)
- Jack Rogers (disambiguation)
