= Jonathan Rogers =

Jonathan Rogers may refer to:

- Jonathan Clark Rogers (1885–1967), American college president
- Jonathan Rogers (GC) (1920–1964), Welsh-born Australian recipient of the George Cross
- Jonathan L. Rogers, American accounting scholar
- Jonathan Rogers (ice dancer), American ice dancer

== See also ==
- Jon Rogers (disambiguation)
