= Johnny Rogers (disambiguation) =

Johnny Rogers is a Spanish-American former basketball player.

Johnny Rogers or Rodgers may also refer to:

- Johnny Rogers (rugby) (1892–1958), Welsh rugby union and rugby league footballer
- Johnny Rogers (1905–1977), a.k.a. B. H. Rogers, Louisiana politician
- Johnny Rogers (1926–2016), British bebop saxophonist, co-founder of Club Eleven
- Johnny Rodgers (born 1951), American football player
- Johnny Rodgers (singer) (born 1974), American singer-songwriter and pianist

== See also ==
- John Rogers (disambiguation)
- John Rodgers (disambiguation)
