= Carol Tomé =

American business executive (born 1957)

Carol B. Tomé
- Born: Carol Louise Buchenroth; January 8, 1957 (age 69); Jackson, Wyoming, U.S.
- Education: University of Wyoming (BA); University of Denver (MBA)
- Occupation: Businesswoman
- Known for: CEO of UPS
- Spouse: Ramon Tomé

Carol B. Tomé (born Carol Louise Buchenroth; January 8, 1957) is an American business executive and chief executive of United Parcel Service (UPS). She formerly served as the chief financial officer of The Home Depot from 1995 to 2019. She has been a board member for UPS since 2003, and upon her appointment to chief executive in 2020, Tomé became the first outsider to lead the company.

== Biography ==
Carol B. Tomé was born Carol Louise Buchenroth on January 8, 1957 in Jackson, Wyoming. Tomé's family emphasized the value of hard work and capability in her upbringing, which Tomé characterizes as "an unbelievable childhood". She learned to hunt, fish, cook, sew, and live off the land. Her father was a community banker. Tomé took an early interest in finance, and envisioned herself following a similar path and working in banking after her graduation from business school at the University of Denver.

Tomé worked as a commercial lender at United Bank of Denver (now, Wells Fargo), was director of banking at Johns-Manville Corporation, and was vice president and treasurer of Riverwood International Corporation of Atlanta (now part of Graphic Packaging), a global paperboard, packaging, and packaging machinery firm. She joined The Home Depot in 1995 when they sought an experienced executive for an expansion into Mexico. She was promoted to CFO in 2001. During her time at the company, The Home Depot grew from 400 stores to 2,200 with revenue of nearly $100 billion. Its share price over her tenure increased more than 450%. She has received praise for The Home Depot's performance after its emergence from the 2008-09 financial and housing crisis.

After a brief retirement, Tomé was announced Chief Executive Officer Elect of UPS, where she had been a member of the board of directors since 2003. In 2020, she became Chief Executive Officer of UPS. In 2023, Tomé's total compensation from UPS was $23.4 million, representing a CEO-to-median worker pay ratio of 436-to-1. Meanwhile, at the head of UPS over the last five years, stock prices have fallen nearly 50%.

Tomé has been a member of the board of the Federal Reserve Bank of Atlanta and was chairman, a member of The Committee of 200, the Atlanta Botanical Garden board of directors, The Business Council, the Metro Atlanta Chamber of Commerce as chairman of the board, the Grady Memorial Hospital as a board trustee, the International Business Council of the World Economic Forum, and the Verizon Communications board of directors.

== Recognition ==
Tomé has been named thrice to the Forbes list of The World's 100 Most Powerful Women as #19, #16 and #12. In 2012, Tomé was listed second on The Wall Street Journal's list of best chief financial officers, and among the top 50 most powerful women in business by Fortune magazine.

Tomé was selected for the inaugural 2021 Forbes 50 Over 50; made up of entrepreneurs, leaders, scientists and creators who are over the age of 50. In 2023, she was ranked 6th on Fortune's list of Most Powerful Women. That same year, she also featured 19th on Forbes list of the World's 100 Most Powerful Women.

In 2024, Tomé was inducted as a Georgia Trustee, an honor given by the Georgia Historical Society in conjunction with the Governor of Georgia to individuals whose accomplishments and community service reflect the ideals of the founding body of Trustees, which governed the Georgia colony from 1732 to 1752.

On May, 3, 2025, Tomé was awarded an honorary doctor of letters degree by Oglethorpe University.

== Personal life ==
Tomé is married to Ramon Tomé. Since 1995, the couple has made various donations to the University of Wyoming (their alma mater), including a $1 million gift for a student recruiting center named in their honor.
