= John Roger =

John Roger may refer to:

- John Roger (died 1441), MP for Bridport and Dorset
- John Roger (died 1415), MP for New Romney

== See also ==
- John Pickersgill Rodger, British colonial administrator
- John Rogers (disambiguation)
- John-Roger Hinkins (1934–2014), American author, public speaker, and founder of the Movement of Spiritual Inner Awareness (MSIA)
