= Jon Rogers =

Jon Rogers may refer to:

- Jon Rogers (musician), see Bad Channels
- Jon Rogers (basketball), see Southeast Texas Mavericks

== See also ==
- Jonathan Rogers (disambiguation)
- John Rogers (disambiguation)
