= United Parcel Service =

American package delivery company

Coordinates: 33°56′36″N 84°21′36″W

United Parcel Service of America, Inc.
- Formerly: American Messenger Company (1907–1913); Merchants Parcel Delivery (1913–1919)
- Type: Public company
- Traded as: NYSE: UPS (Class B); DJTA component; S&P 100 component; S&P 500 component
- Industry: Courier
- Founded: August 28, 1907; 119 years ago in Seattle, Washington, U.S., as the American Messenger Company
- Founder: James E. Casey
- Headquarters: Sandy Springs, Georgia, U.S.
- Area served: Worldwide
- Key people: Carol B. Tomé (CEO); William R. Johnson (chairman)
- Services: Courier express services; Freight forwarding services; Logistics services
- Revenue: ▼US$88.7 billion (2025)
- Net income: ▼US$5.57 billion (2025)
- Number of employees: c. 460,000 (2026)
- Subsidiaries: UPS Airlines; Nightline Group; Marken; UPS Logistics; UPS Mail Innovations; UPS Professional Solutions; Roadie; UPS i-parcel
- Website: ups.com

United Parcel Service, Inc. (UPS) is an American multinational shipping-and-receiving and supply chain management company founded in 1907. Originally known as the American Messenger Company specializing in telegraphs, UPS has expanded to become a Fortune 500 company and one of the world's largest shipping couriers. UPS today is primarily known for its ground shipping services as well as the UPS Store, a retail chain which assists UPS shipments and provides tools for small businesses. UPS offers air shipping on an overnight or two-day basis and delivers to post office boxes through UPS Mail Innovations and UPS Ground Saver.

UPS is the largest courier company in the world by revenue, with annual revenues around US$85 billion in 2020, ahead of competitors DHL and FedEx. UPS's main international hub, UPS Worldport in Louisville, Kentucky, is the fifth busiest airport in the world by cargo traffic based on preliminary statistics from ACI, and the third busiest in the U.S. The company is one of the largest private employers in the United States. As of 2023, UPS is third in U.S. parcel volumes shipped since 2015, trailing the United States Postal Service and Amazon. There are about 460,000 employees.

== History ==
=== Foundation ===
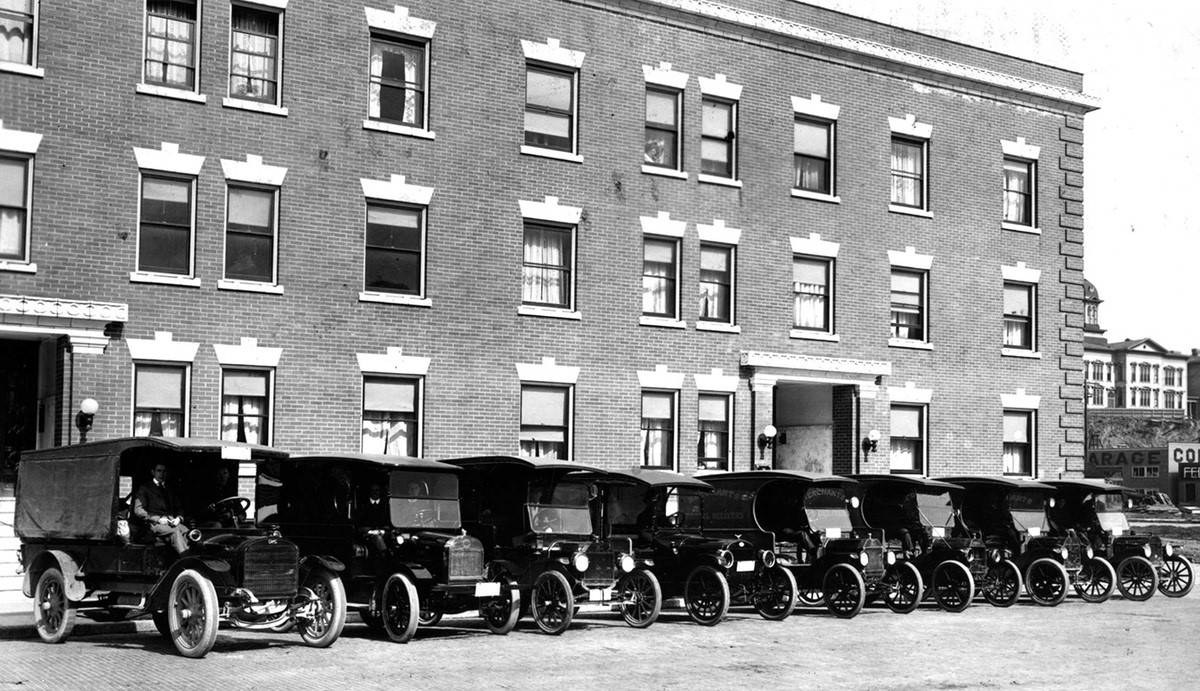
Merchants Parcel Delivery vehicles, 1916

On August 28, 1907, James E. Casey founded the American Messenger Company with Claude Ryan in Seattle, Washington, capitalized with $100 in debt. Most deliveries at this time were made on foot and bicycles (later streetcars) were used for longer trips. The company received telephone calls for its deliveries.

The American Messenger Company focused primarily on package delivery to retail stores with special delivery mail coming into Seattle for its largest client, the United States Post Office Department—the predecessor of today's United States Postal Service. Due to improvements in telephony and in the auto industry, demand for messenger service declined. The company addressed this by shifting focus to package delivery for retail stores. In 1913, the company acquired a Ford Model T as its first delivery vehicle. Casey and Ryan merged with a competitor, Evert McCabe, and formed Merchants Parcel Delivery. Consolidated delivery was also introduced, combining packages addressed to a certain neighborhood onto one delivery vehicle.

In 1916, Charlie Soderstrom joined Merchants Parcel Delivery bringing in more vehicles for the growing delivery business. In 1919, the company expanded for the first time outside of Seattle to Oakland, California, and changed its name to United Parcel Service.

The common carrier service was acquired in 1922 from a company in Los Angeles, California. UPS became one of the only companies in the United States to offer common carrier service. At first, common carrier was only limited to a small area around Los Angeles but by 1927 expanded to areas up to 125 miles outside the city. In 1924, a conveyor belt system was debuted for the handling of packages for UPS operations.

In 1930, a consolidated carrier service began in New York City; soon after, the company expanded its services to include other major cities in the East and the Midwest. The use of a common carrier for delivery between all customers placed UPS in direct competition with USPS, and delivering parcels beyond the California border brought it under the jurisdiction of the Interstate Commerce Commission. The first city for UPS to use common carrier status outside California was Chicago, Illinois, in 1953.

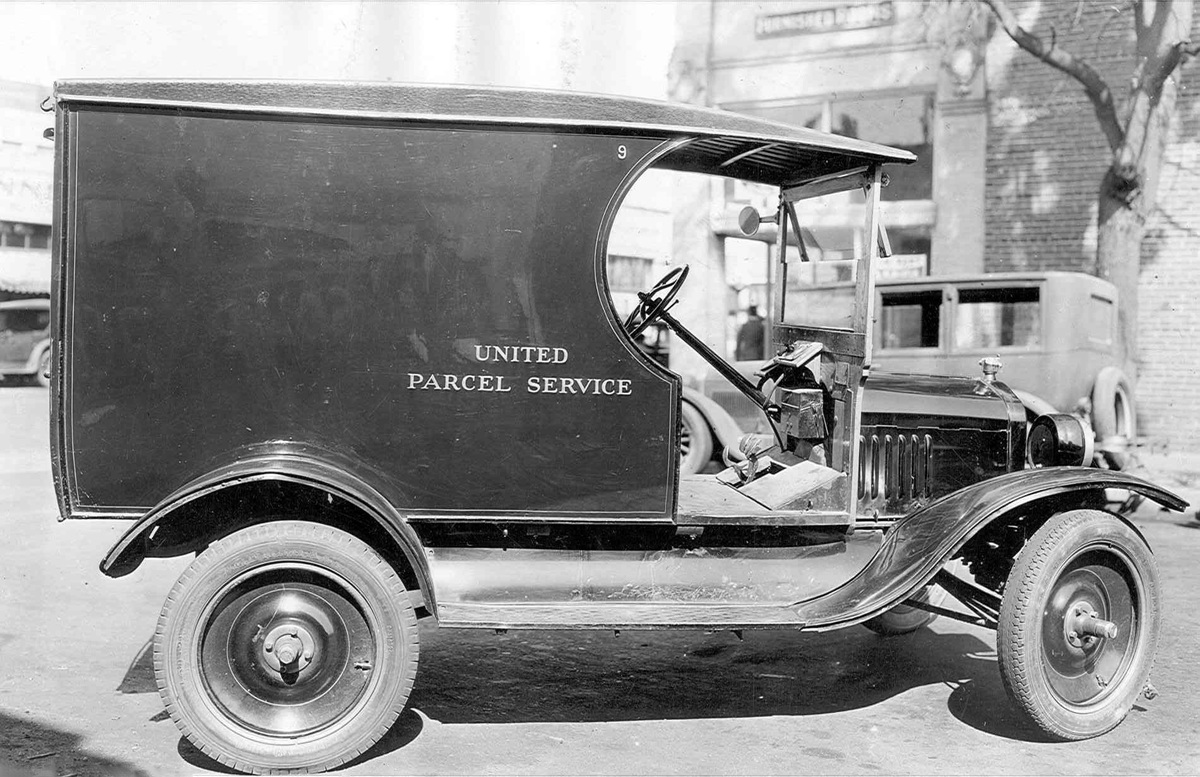
Ford Model T UPS delivery vehicle in 1921

Air service through UPS was first used in 1929 through private airlines. However, the Great Depression and a lack of volume ended the service. In 1953, UPS resumed air service called UPS Blue Label Air with two-day service to major cities along the East Coast and West Coast.

=== Expansion and diversification ===
In 1975, UPS moved its headquarters to Greenwich, Connecticut, and began serving all of the 48 contiguous states of the United States. This expansion of operations made UPS the first package delivery company to serve every address in the contiguous United States. Additionally in 1975, UPS went international by establishing operations in Canada. In 1976, UPS established a domestic operation in West Germany.

UPS Next Day Air Service was launched in 1985 for all 48 contiguous states plus Puerto Rico. In 1988, UPS Airlines was launched with authorization from the Federal Aviation Administration and became the fastest-growing airline in FAA history – currently the 10th largest airline in the United States. Domestic air service was added to Germany in 1989. In 1991, UPS relocated its headquarters to Sandy Springs, Georgia, a suburb of Atlanta. Following this in 1992, UPS acquired both Haulfast and Carryfast and rebranded them into UPS Supply Chain Solutions. Haulfast provided the pallet haulage and trucking network for the CarryFast group of companies. By 1993, UPS was delivering up to 11.5 million packages and documents per day.

In order for the company to service the large volume of customers in 1991, UPS developed technologies to improve efficiency. A handheld device named the "Delivery Information Acquisition Device" (DIAD) was created to record and upload delivery information to the UPS network immediately upon pickup by every UPS driver. In 1992, UPS began tracking all ground shipments electronically. In 1994, UPS.com debuted, and provided an interface to make what was primarily internal operational information available for customer access.

In 1995, UPS acquired SonicAir to offer service parts logistics and compete with Choice Logistics. In the same year, UPS launched the UPS Logistics Group to facilitate global supply chain management services and consulting for customer needs. In 1997, a walkout by the 185,000 members of the Teamsters shut down UPS for 16 days. In 1998, UPS Capital was established to enable companies to grow their business through a comprehensive menu of integrated financial services through UPS. UPS acquired Challenge Air in 1999 to expand its operations in Latin America.

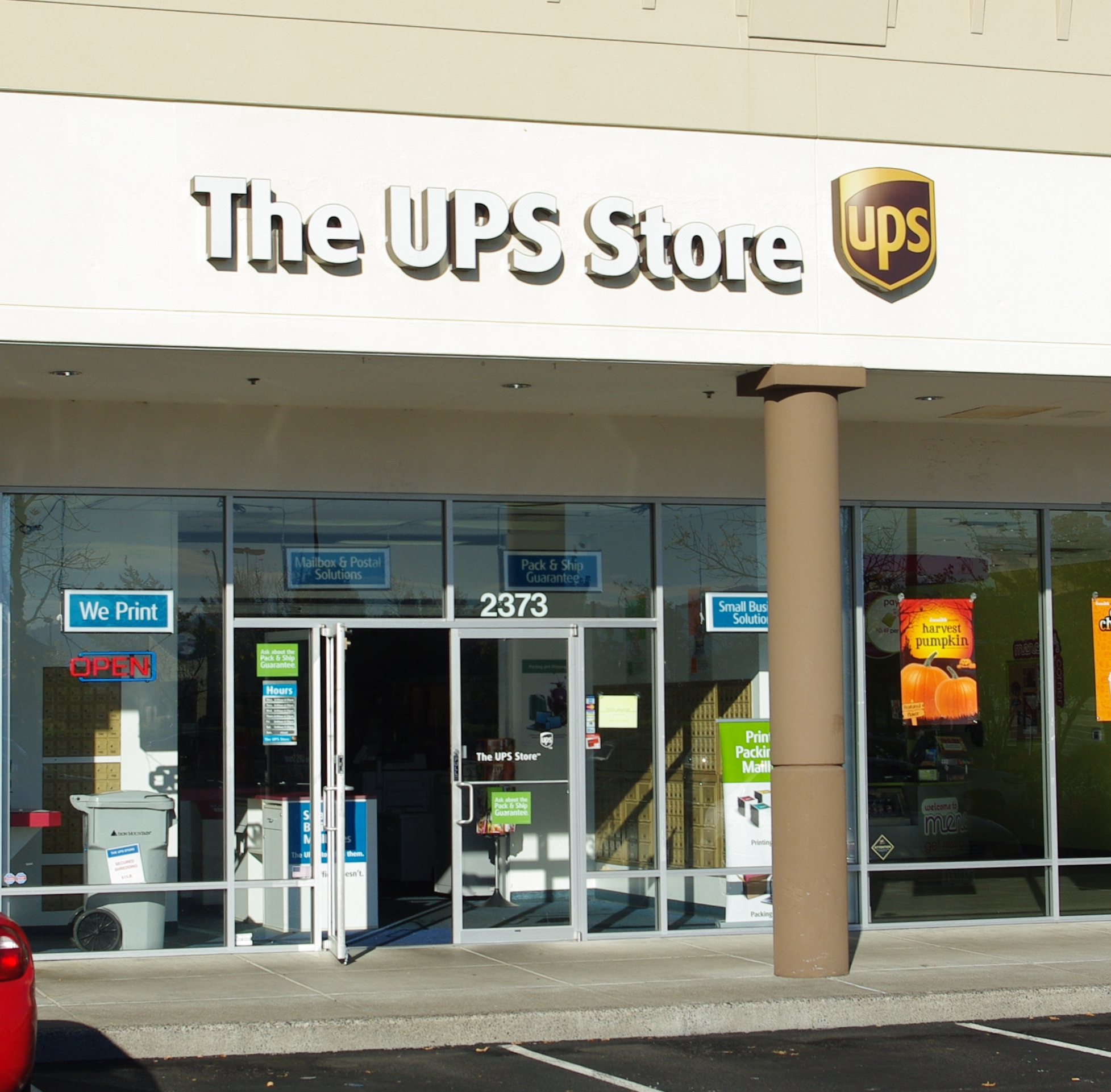
Mail Boxes Etc., Inc. was re-branded as The UPS Store in 2001.

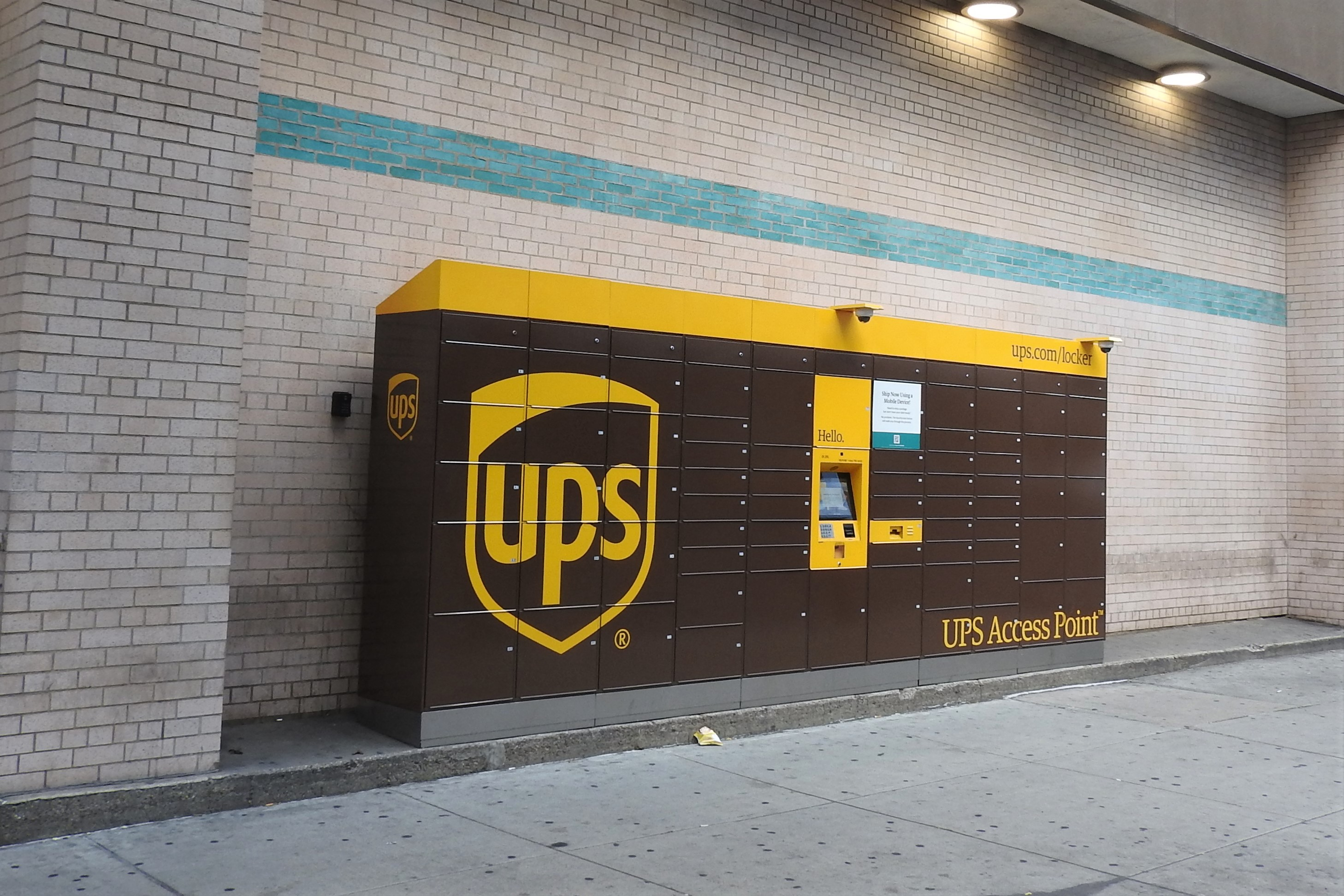
UPS Access Point on 11th Avenue in New York City

On November 10, 1999, UPS became a public company in the largest initial public offering of the 20th century.

=== 21st century ===
In 2001, UPS acquired Mail Boxes Etc., Inc., a franchised network of packing and shipping retail centers across the United States and Canada. In 2003, the company rebranded the Mail Boxes, Etc. network as The UPS Store.

In 2004, UPS entered the heavy freight business with the purchase of Menlo Worldwide Forwarding, a former subsidiary of Menlo Worldwide; UPS rebranded it as UPS Supply Chain Solutions. The purchase price was US$150 million and the assumption of US$110 million in long-term debt.

On August 5, 2005, UPS announced that it had completed its acquisition of less-than-truckload (LTL) trucking company Overnite Transportation for US$1.25 billion. This was approved by the FTC and Overnite shareholders on August 4, 2005. On April 28, 2006, Overnite officially became UPS Freight.

In 2005, UPS offered non-stop delivery service between Guangzhou and the United States. On October 3, 2005, UPS completed the purchase of Lynx Express, one of the largest independent parcel carriers in the United Kingdom, for £55.5 million (US$97.1 million) after receiving approval for the transaction from the European Commission. The first joint package car center operation in Dartford, Kent, was opened in 2006.

On August 28, 2007, United Parcel Service celebrated its 100th anniversary. All Nippon Airways, a Star Alliance member, and UPS formed a cargo alliance and codeshare agreement to transport member cargo in 2008, similarly to an airline alliance.

On March 19, 2012, UPS announced that it intended to acquire TNT Express for $6.8 billion, in a move to help expand its presence in European and Asian markets. However, the deal fell through in January 2013, after it was announced that UPS had failed to obtain permission from the European Commission and as such had been blocked on competition grounds.

In February 2012, UPS acquired Brussels-based company Kiala that provides e-commerce retailers the option to have goods delivered to a conventional retail location.

In 2018, The Wall Street Journal reported that UPS's operations were hampered by its outdated 20th-century technology, lagging behind its competitors.

In May 2019, UPS launched a partnership with autonomous trucking startup TuSimple to carry cargo across Phoenix, Arizona, and Tucson, Arizona.

In October 2019, UPS won the approval of the Federal Aviation Administration to fly drones. The certification will allow UPS to deliver health care supplies using a fleet of drones.

On January 29, 2020, UPS announced it was investing in UK start-up Arrival and ordering 10,000 Generation 2 electric vehicles as a step towards a cleaner, more high-tech fleet. The deal ran from 2020 until 2024 and was reported to be worth more than $400 million.

In March 2020, the company appointed Carol Tomé to succeed David Abney as its chief executive officer. It was viewed as a move to steer the parcel delivery company through the turbulence of trade wars, technological disruption and the risk of a pandemic-induced recession.

In March 2020, UPS expanded its autonomous trips with TuSimple by adding an extra route between Phoenix and El Paso, Texas.

In January 2021, UPS announced it had agreed to sell UPS Freight, its less-than-truckload freight business, to TFI International, a Canadian transport and logistics company, for $800 million. UPS said the move would allow it to focus on small-package delivery. At the time of the sale, UPS Freight had about 14,500 employees, approximately 11,000 of them represented by the Teamsters union, and generated an estimated $3.15 billion in revenue in 2020 offering services across the US, Canada, and Mexico. TFI had reported $4.1 billion in revenue in 2019 and already operated truckload and LTL services in Canada. The acquisition was completed in April and UPS Freight was renamed TForce Freight.

In 2021, following the company's shift to target smaller customers to boost profits during the COVID-19 pandemic, UPS reported a 21% jump in their fourth quarter sales to $24.9 billion. CEO Carol Tomé reported that Amazon paid UPS $11.3 billion in shipping in 2020, accounting for 13.3% of the company's revenue.

In September 2021, UPS entered into an agreement to acquire Roadie for an undisclosed amount with the transaction expected to be closed in the fourth quarter.

In May 2022, UPS acquired logistics company Delivery Solutions, a key partner for Walmart's GoLocal network.

In November 2022, it was announced UPS had acquired the healthcare focused, Europe-based warehousing and temperature-controlled transport company, Bomi Group.

In September 2023, it was announced UPS had acquired the Long Beach, California-headquartered time-critical, health care logistics company, MNX for an undisclosed amount.

In October 2023, it was announced UPS had acquired the Los Angeles-headquartered reverse logistics company, Happy Returns from PayPal for an undisclosed amount.

In January 2024, UPS announced that it planned to cut 12,000 jobs and mandate that staff return to the office five days a week. Chief Executive Carol Tomé blamed the move on a "difficult and disappointing year" in 2023.

In July 2024, UPS announced an agreement to acquire the Mexican logistics company Estafeta. Although the deal was expected to close in the first half of 2025, UPS terminated the planned acquisition on September 17, 2025, citing the inability to satisfy all required closing conditions in a filing with the SEC. According to reporting by The Wall Street Journal, the cancellation follows a more than year-long effort to integrate the Mexican small-package provider into UPS's regional growth strategy.

In October 2025, the company announced it had reduced its workforce by 48,000 jobs in 2025, with 14,000 positions cut in management and 34,000 positions across its operations.

In 2025, UPS began reducing the volume of packages it handled for its largest customer, Amazon, as part of a strategy to focus on higher-yielding business. The change was part of a broader restructuring of UPS's network and business portfolio.

== Operational facilities ==
=== United States ===
==== Louisville UPS Worldport ====
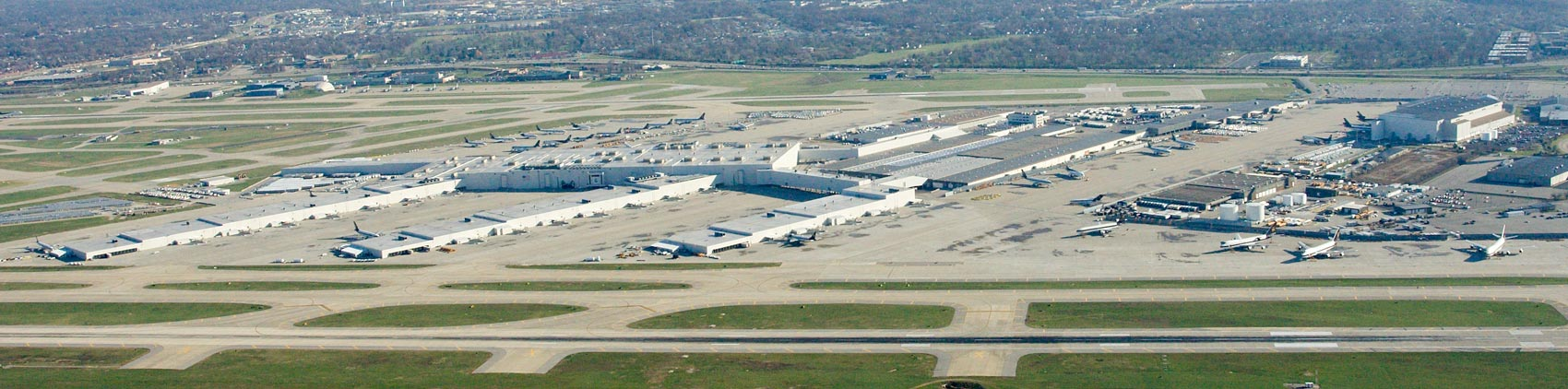
Panorama of UPS Worldport Air Hub at Louisville International Airport in 2004

UPS' global hub for air shipments is the Worldport, located at Louisville Muhammad Ali International Airport. The facility contributes to the airport's status of the third-busiest cargo airport in the United States and the fifth-busiest worldwide.

The Worldport consists of:

- 290 aircraft;
- more than 20,000 employees;
- 5.2 million square feet of building space (about 90 football fields).
- the capacity to handle 115 packages per second (equivalent to 416,000 packages flowing through its facilities every hour);

==== Regional air hubs ====
UPS has five large regional air hubs in the United States, located in Ontario, California; Dallas, Texas; Rockford, Illinois; Philadelphia, Pennsylvania; and Atlanta, Georgia. These hubs serve as centers for sorting, transfer and delivery of packages.

=== Europe ===
==== UPS European service hub ====
UPS' European service hub is located at Cologne Bonn Airport in Cologne, Germany. The Cologne Hub handles 190,000 packages an hour in the 57,000m² facility. It is the second-busiest UPS hub worldwide, in terms of daily flights serving more than 200 countries and territories around the world.

==== Poland ====
UPS has established a 11,000 square meter package center in Mysłowice. The facility is equipped with a conveyor belt system capable of sorting up to 6,000 packages per hour. It also offers parking for 170 package cars and houses a customer call center. The Mysłowice facility is more than three times larger than the one in Katowice. Mysłowice was chosen as the location for the new facility in 2017 due to its proximity to various business distribution centers and Katowice airport, where UPS has invested in additional air cargo capacity.

==== Turkey ====
UPS has 15 small package and four SCS operating facilities in Turkey, located in various cities such as Istanbul, Ankara, Izmir, Bursa, and Antalya.

=== Asia-Pacific Region ===
==== Asia-Pacific Air Hub ====
UPS's Asia-Pacific Air Hub is located at Singapore Changi Airport. The hub has been expanded by 25% in 2023 to meet the growing e-commerce demand following the pandemic. After the upgrade, it can process 40% more import packages and 45% more export packages, enabling extended pick-up cut-off times for all export services.

The hub also features refrigerators and freezers that can maintain temperatures between −20 and 25 °C (−4 and 77 °F) to facilitate the temporary storage of shipments, especially for critical healthcare deliveries such as COVID-19 vaccines. It is part of Changi's cold chain infrastructure, which ensures an unbroken cold chain for pharmaceutical manufacturers.

==== Regional hubs ====
UPS has five regional hubs in the Asia-Pacific region, located in Hong Kong, Japan, Korea, Malaysia, and Thailand. These hubs serve as major sorting and distribution centers for packages moving within and between regions.

== Finances ==
For the fiscal year 2025, UPS reported net income of US$5.57 billion and revenue of US$88.66 billion, a decrease of 2.6% in revenue from the previous fiscal year. UPS ranked No. 34 on the 2022 Fortune 500 list of the largest United States corporations by total revenue.

Year	Revenue in mil. USD	Net income in mil. USD	Total Assets in mil. USD	Employees
2005	42,581	3,870	34,947	407,000
2006	47,547	4,202	33,210	428,000
2007	49,692	382	39,042	425,300
2008	51,486	3,003	31,879	426,000
2009	45,297	1,968	31,883	408,000
2010	49,545	3,338	33,597	400,600
2011	53,105	3,804	34,701	398,000
2012	54,127	807	38,863	399,000
2013	55,438	4,372	36,212	395,000
2014	58,232	3,032	35,440	435,000
2015	58,363	4,844	38,311	444,000
2016	60,906	3,431	40,377	434,000
2017	65,872	4,910	45,403	454,000
2018	71,861	4,791	50,016	481,000
2019	74,094	4,440	57,857	495,000
2020	84,628	1,343	62,408	458,000
2021	97,287	12,890	69,405	534,000
2022	100,338	11,548	71,124	536,000
2023	90,958	6,708	70,857	500,000

== Operations ==
UPS's primary business is the time-definite delivery of packages and documents worldwide. In recent years, UPS has extended its service portfolio to include less-than-truckload (LTL) transportation and supply chain services, primarily in the U.S.

UPS reports its operations in three segments:

- U.S. Domestic Package operations,
- International Package operations, and
- Supply Chain & Freight operations.

=== United States domestic shipping ===
UPS services for consumers include:

- UPS Ground for day-definite delivery. Can take up to 5 days.
- UPS 3-Day Select for less-sensitive express shipments. This service may use either air or ground transportation depending on distance, demand, and weather conditions, and as noted by its name, can take up to three days.
- UPS 2nd Day Air for packages that must arrive within two days. UPS also offers a 2nd Day Air AM service which offers morning delivery.
- UPS Next Day Air for shipments that require overnight service. UPS splits Next Day Air into three tiers:
  - Next Day Air Saver: guaranteed overnight shipping with afternoon delivery
  - Next Day Air: guaranteed overnight delivery between 10:30 AM and noon
  - Next Day Air Early: guaranteed overnight shipping by 8:30 AM for major US cities and 9:30 AM to most other destinations.
- UPS Express Critical: UPS' fastest service. Delivers to all 50 states, DC, and Puerto Rico by end of day.

UPS also offers UPS Ground Saver (formerly SurePost), in which packages are handled by UPS in intermodal transit, and delivered last-mile by USPS.

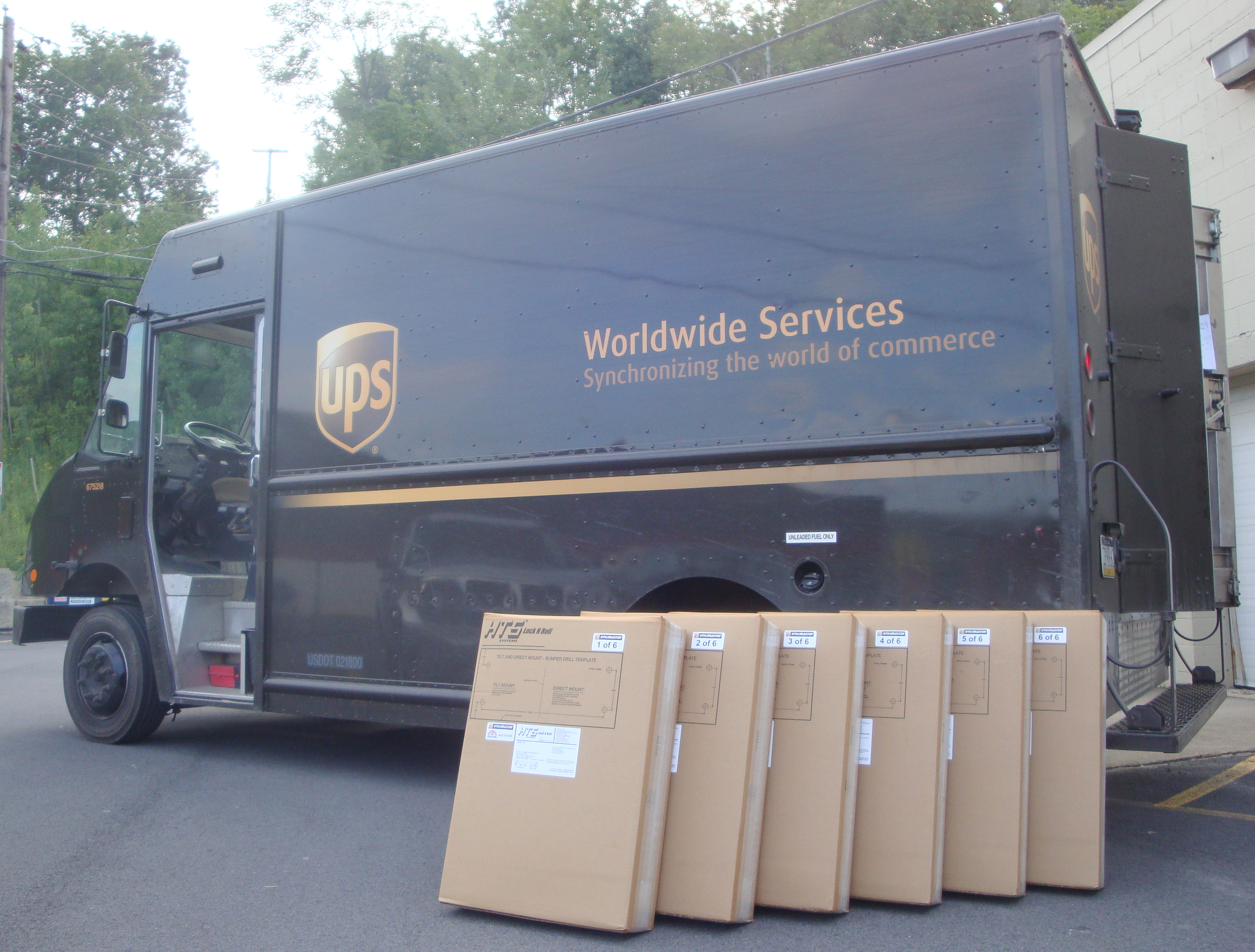
UPS delivery van with packages in 2013

=== International Package ===
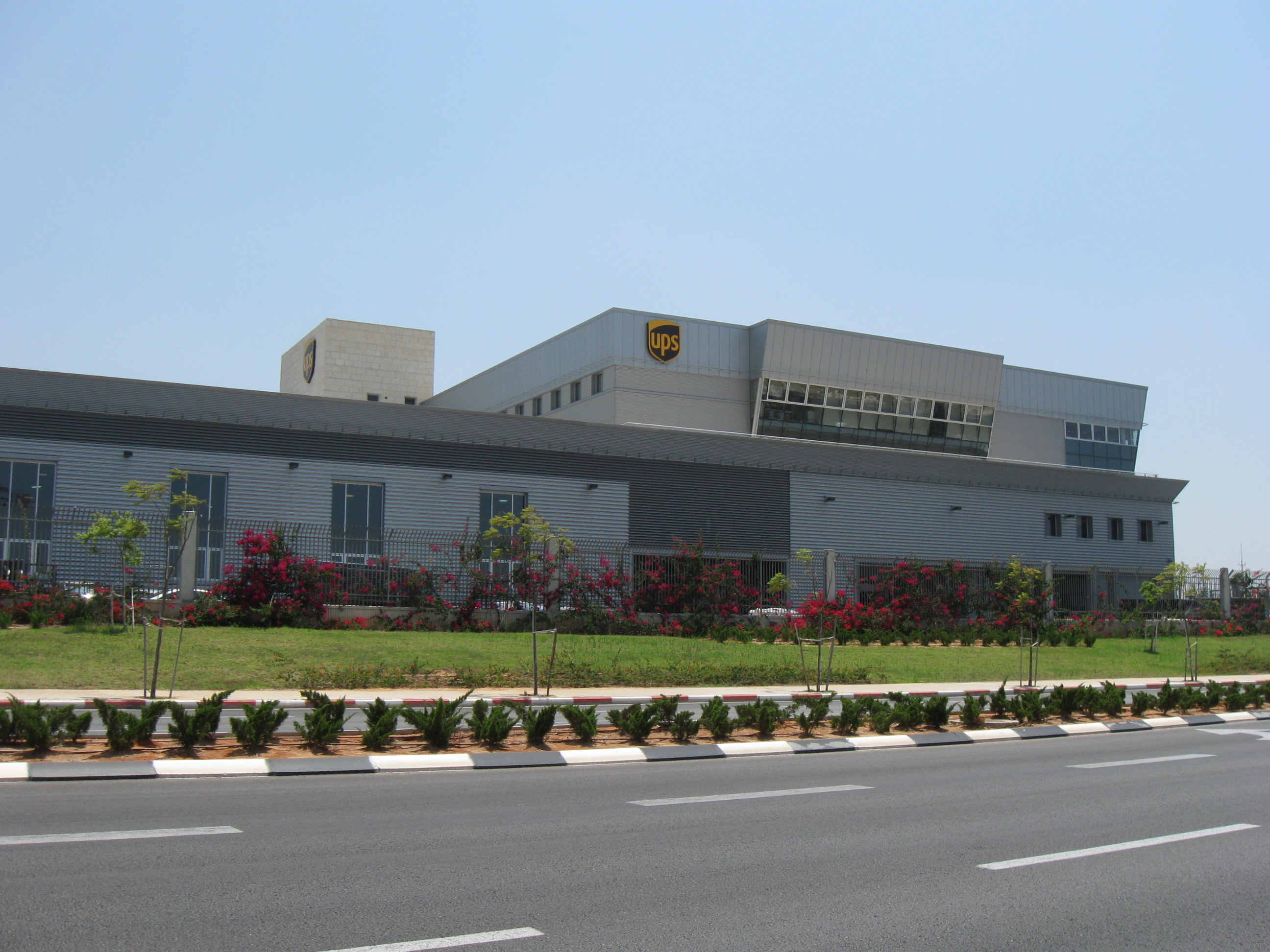
UPS has service worldwide, including at Israel's Ben Gurion International Airport.

International Package operations include delivery to more than 220 countries and territories worldwide, including shipments wholly outside the United States, as well as shipments with either origin or distribution outside the United States.

UPS splits its international shipping into a few services:

- UPS Standard for shipments to Mexico and Canada
- UPS Worldwide Expedited for all international shipments usually delivered within 2-5 business days
- UPS Worldwide Saver, also for all international shipments usually delivered overnight to Canada, 2 Days to Mexico, Latin America, and Europe, and 3 or more days to the rest of the world, all by the end of the day.
- UPS Worldwide Express for more critical international shipments with similar time frames to Worldwide Saver. Delivers around 10:30 AM to Noon.
- UPS Worldwide Express Plus for Worldwide Express shipments that need to arrive to their destination earlier in the morning.

=== Supply Chain & Freight ===
Supply Chain & Freight (UPS-SCS for UPS Supply Chain Solutions) includes UPS' forwarding and contract logistics operations and other related business units. UPS' forwarding and logistics business provides services in more than 175 countries and territories worldwide and includes worldwide supply chain design, execution and management, freight forwarding and distribution, customs brokerage, mail and consulting services.

Other business units within this segment include The UPS Store and UPS Capital.

- Trailer / railroad reporting marks: UPGX, UPGZ, UPOZ, UPSZ, UPWZ, UPSC, UPSU, NONZ
- NMFTA SCAC code: UPSS, UPSN, UPSC

Until 2021, this segment also included UPS Freight which offered a variety of less than truckload ("LTL") and truckload ("TL") services to customers in North America. UPS Freight was sold to TFI International in April 2021 and was renamed TForce Freight.

=== Personnel structure ===
In 2016, UPS employed approximately 444,000 staff: 362,000 in the U.S. and 82,000 internationally. In 2023, approximately 330,000 UPS drivers, package handlers, and clerks are represented by the International Brotherhood of Teamsters with more than 50% of those being part-time workers. In 2023, the average UPS full-time package delivery worker with more than four years experience was paid $95,000 per year.

During the United Parcel Service strike of 1997, the company's only nationwide strike in its history, which lasted 16 days, Teamster President Ron Carey negotiated a new contract for workers. In July 2023, before their contract was set to expire, a strike was threatened over union demands of increases in wages, benefits, and air conditioning in delivery vans. A 10-day strike would have been the largest single-employer strike in US history and would have cost the US economy more than $7 billion. The strike was called off after UPS agreed to increase starting pay for part-time workers to $21 per hour, in addition to other concessions. UPS had previously announced the non-economic portions of the agreement had been settled, including to equip new delivery vans with air conditioning starting January 2024 combined with retrofitting existing vehicles with 2 fans, additional ventilation of the cargo area and shielding to reduce heat from the exhaust being transmitted to the cargo area of delivery vehicles. All tractor trailers are already equipped with AC.

=== Chief executives ===
- 1907–1962, James E. "Jim" Casey
- 1962–1972, George D. Smith
- 1972–1973, Paul Oberkotter
- 1973–1980, Harold Oberkotter
- 1980–1984, George Lamb
- 1984–1989, John W. Rogers
- 1989–1996, Kent C. "Oz" Nelson
- 1997–2001, James P. Kelly
- 2002–2007, Michael L. "Mike" Eskew
- 2008–2014, Scott Davis
- 2014–2020, David Abney
- 2020–current, Carol B. Tomé

== Competitors ==
Major competitors in the United States include the United States Postal Service (USPS), FedEx, and Amazon Logistics, along with regional carriers such as OnTrac, and LSO (formerly Lonestar Overnight). In addition to these domestic carriers, UPS competes with a variety of international operators, including SF Express, Canada Post (and its subsidiary Purolator), TransForce, Deutsche Post (and its subsidiary DHL), La Poste (France) (and its subsidiary Chronopost), Royal Mail, Japan Post Service, and many other regional carriers, national postal services and air cargo handlers.

Historically, the bulk of competition for UPS came from inexpensive ground-based delivery services, such as Parcel Post (USPS) or Choice Logistics. In 1998, FedEx expanded into ground parcel delivery through its acquisition of RPS (formerly Roadway Package System), rebranding it as FedEx Ground in 2000. In 2003, DHL acquired Airborne Express, expanding its operations in the United States.

In response to the expansion of FedEx and DHL, UPS partnered with the US Postal Service to offer UPS Mail Innovations, a program that allows UPS to pick up mail and packages weighing under one pound separately from the main ground network and transfer them to a USPS center, or destination delivery unit (DDU), for final distribution. This process is also known as zone skipping, long used by parcel consolidators. UPS also has a separate product called "Ground Saver" which uses the UPS Ground network to deliver packages weighing under 10 pounds to the nearest UPS Package Center, which transfers them to the USPS DDU for "final mile" delivery.

More recently, the continued growth of online shopping, combined with increasing awareness of the role of transportation (including package delivery) on the environment, has contributed to the rise of emerging competition from niche carriers or rebranded incumbents. For instance, the US Postal Service claims "greener delivery" of parcels on the assumption that USPS letter carriers deliver to each US address, six days a week anyway, and therefore offer the industry's lowest fuel consumption per delivery. Other carriers, like ParcelPool.com, which specializes in residential package delivery to APO/FPO addresses, Hawaii, Alaska, Puerto Rico, and other US Territories, arose in response to increased demand from catalog retailers and online e-tailers for low-cost residential delivery services closely matching service standards normally associated with more expensive expedited parcel delivery.

In 2019, UPS sued in an attempt to force USPS to raise their prices, but was rejected by the Supreme Court.

== Transportation ==
UPS operates over 119,000 delivery vehicles worldwide, ranging from bicycles to tractor-trailer trucks. In a long-running company policy to avoid advertisement or endorsement of a vehicle manufacturer, all external manufacturer emblems and badging are removed when a vehicle enters service (whenever possible).

The typical lifespan of a UPS ground vehicle is 20–25 years (or more), lasting until the structural integrity is compromised. The company does not re-sell any of its ground vehicles. As such, retired vehicles are almost always stripped of reusable parts before being sent to be crushed/broken up. Prior to scrapping, UPS trucks and trailers have all company branding painted over and are assigned an ADA (Automotive Destruction Authorization) number and must be crushed under the supervision of UPS Automotive personnel, which records the vehicle's destruction. The only exception to this policy are vehicles taken off the road for internal company use; package cars (repainted white) are used for various purposes (typically at large hubs); older semi tractors sometimes see use as terminal tractors.

=== Delivery vans ===
UPS refers to its delivery van as a "package car". Several designs and sizes are used by the company, dependent on routes and package volume; the distinct design of the rounded "bubble-nose" front hood and upper roofline was introduced in 1965. The bodies of the package cars are manufactured by Morgan Olson (Grumman Olson), Union City Body, and Utilimaster; while older vehicles were based on Ford or General Motors P-chassis, vehicles manufactured in the 21st century use Freightliner or Workhorse chassis.

Until the end of the 20th century, UPS delivery vehicles were equipped with manual transmissions and steering, with automatic transmissions and power steering adopted by newer vehicles.

For lower-volume delivery routes, UPS utilizes production-based vehicles, including minivans (including the Ford Transit Connect or the Ford Transit, and Dodge Grand Caravan C/V) and Mercedes-Benz (Dodge/Freightliner) Sprinter box vans. UPS has ordered Modec electric vans for its UK and German fleets. Energy costs play a huge part in the potential profitability of package delivery companies.

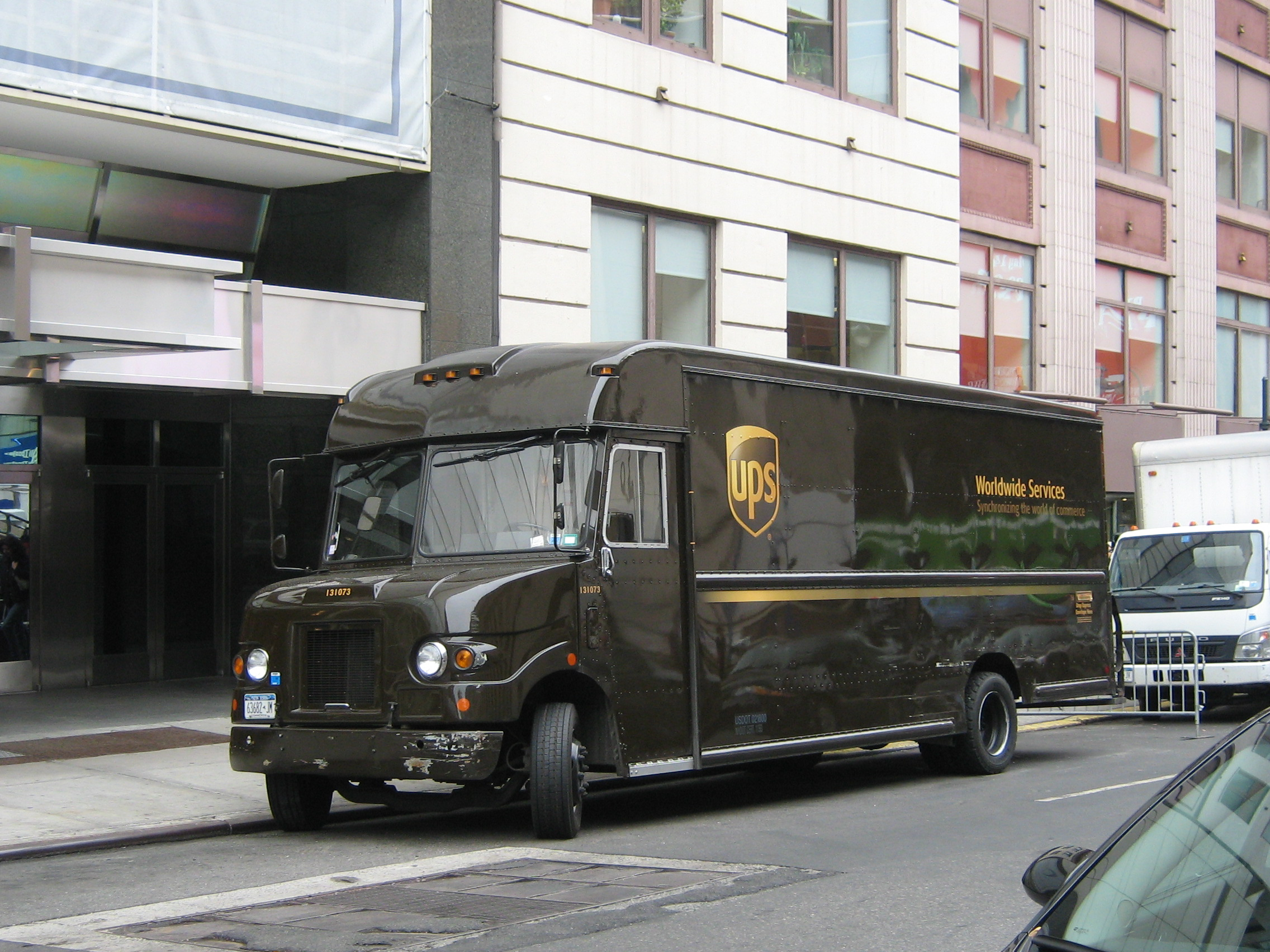
1990s Grumman Olson/Navistar package car, showing 1965-design rounded nose and upper fascia

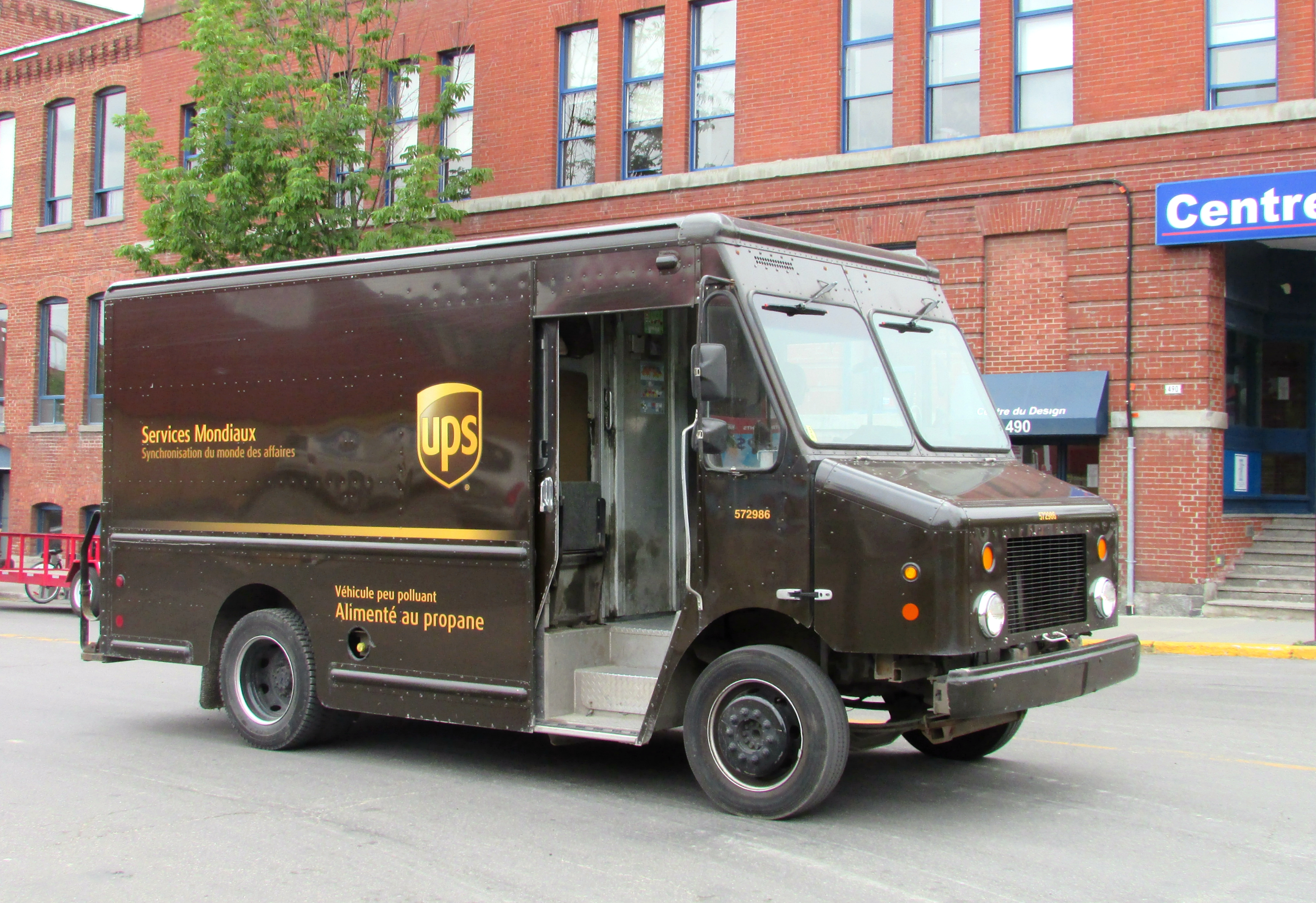
2000s propane-fueled package car in Montreal, Quebec

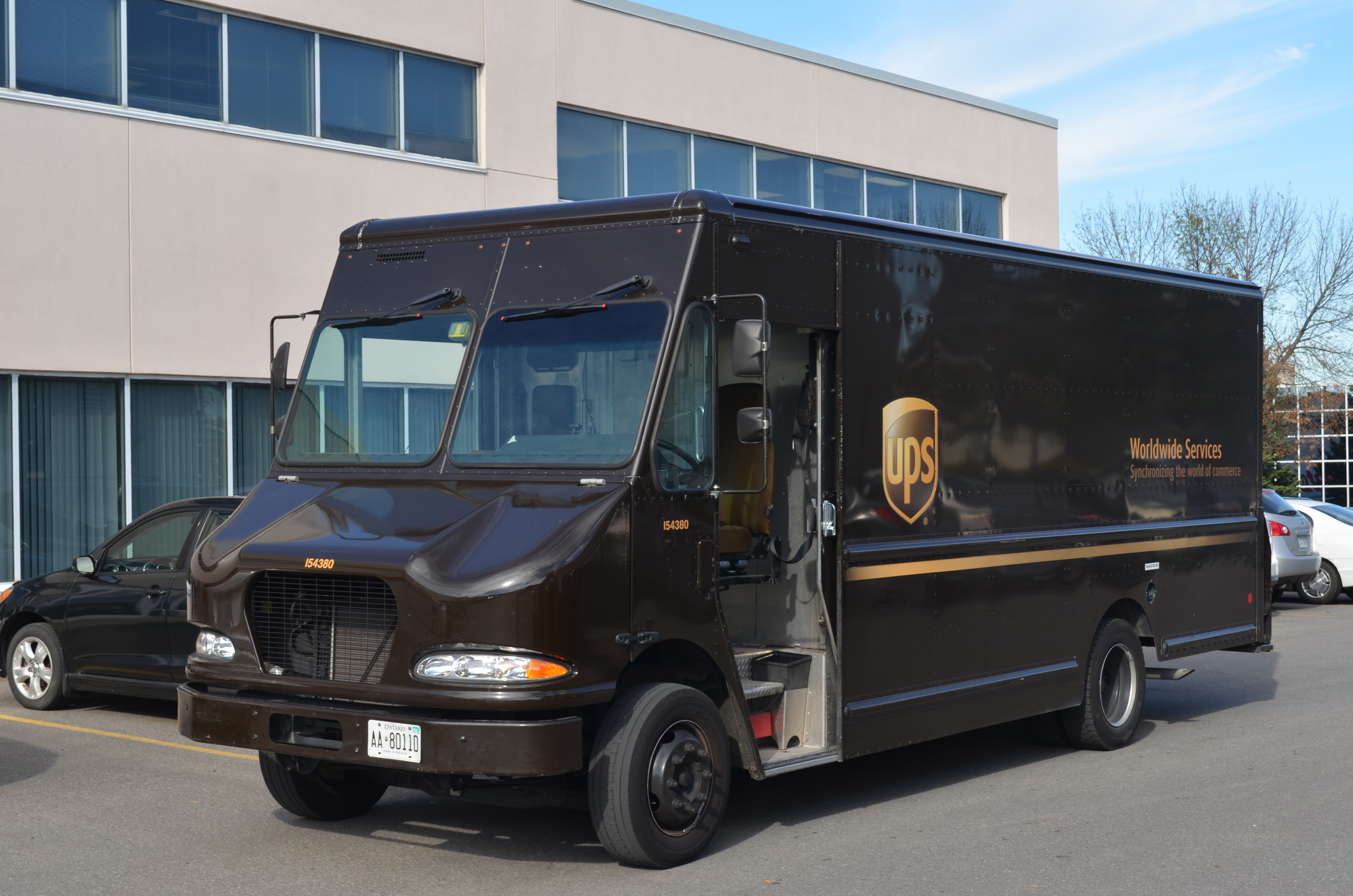
Early 2010s package car in Ontario

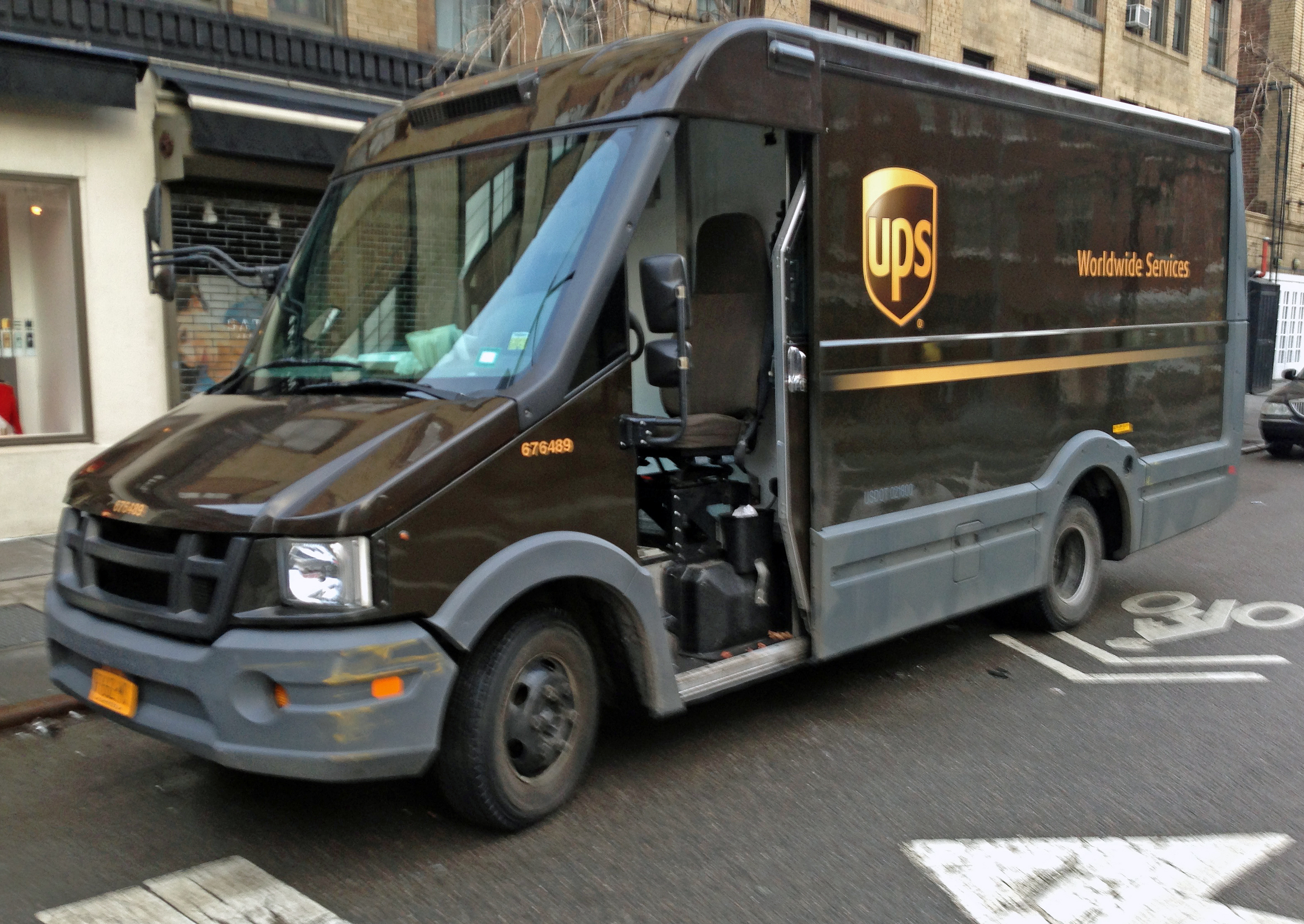
Utilimaster-body package car on Isuzu Reach chassis in New York City

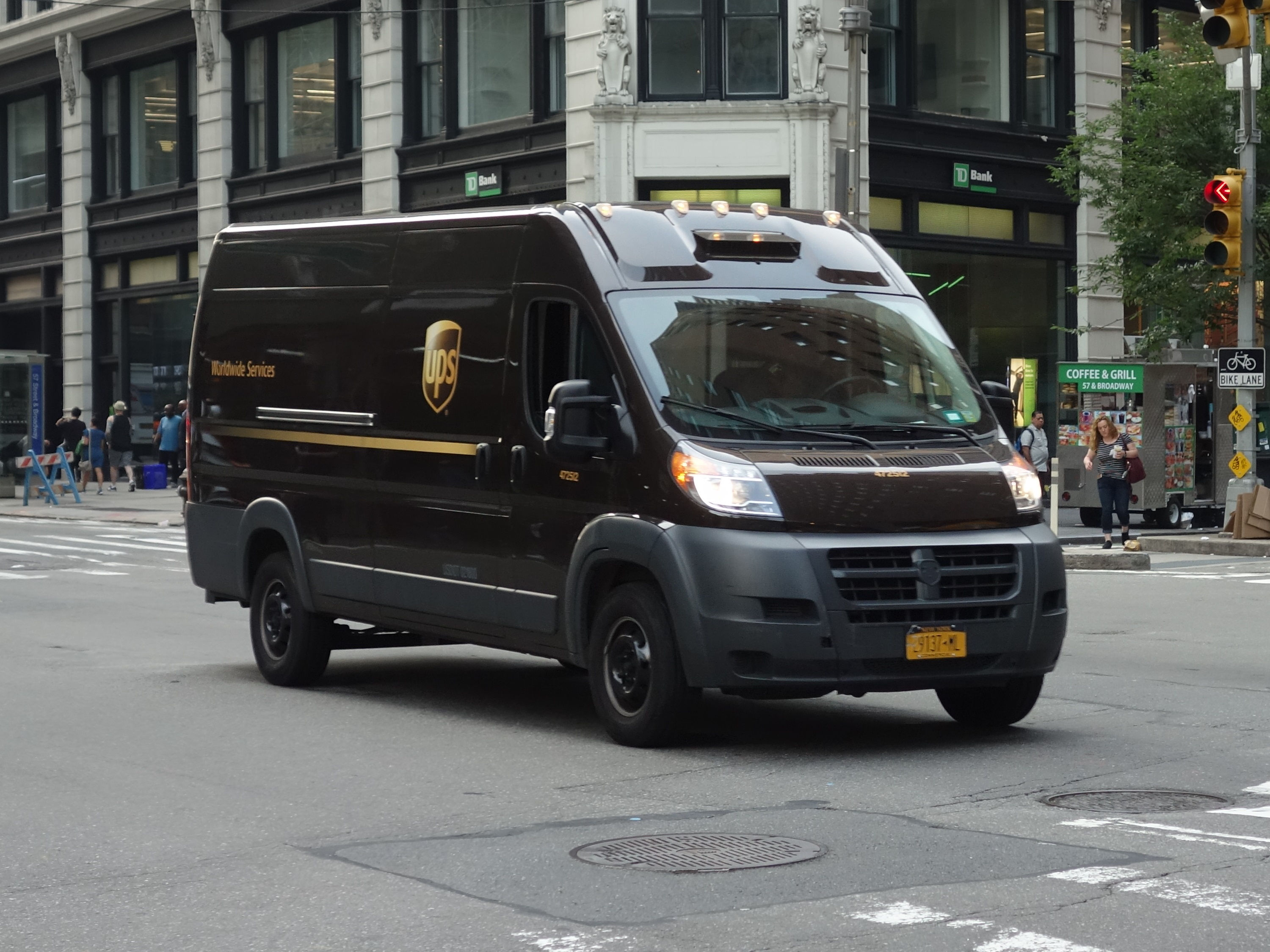
Ram ProMaster package car

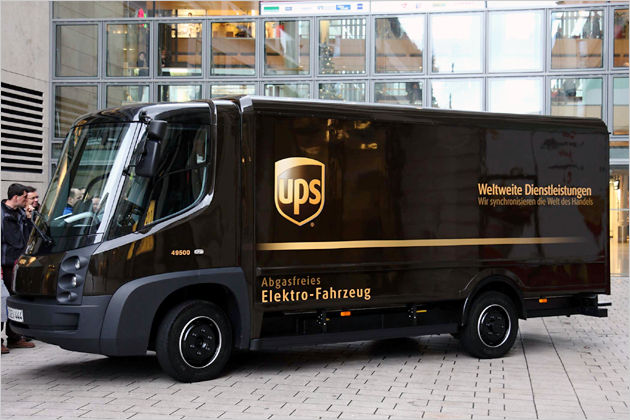
Modec electric-powered van in Germany

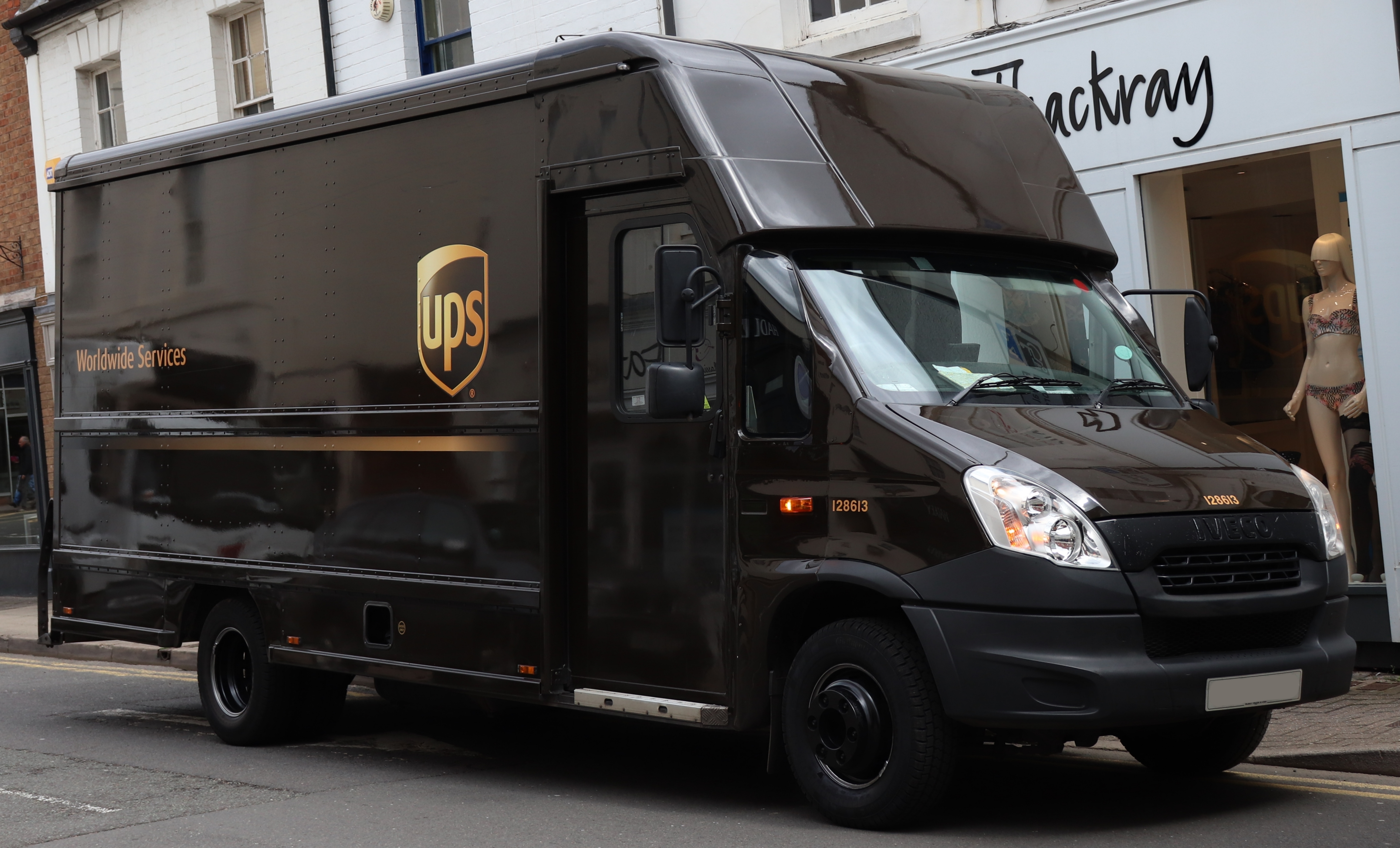
Iveco Daily package car in Leamington Spa, United Kingdom

Most UPS Ground vehicles have no air conditioning, with the exception of tractor-trailers. This has been considered to be a contributing factor to heatstroke and other heat-related health problems in drivers who work in these vehicles for the entire shift. Modern vehicles have improved ventilation systems.

On January 29, 2020, UPS invested in Arrival and ordered 10,000 Generation 2 Electric Vehicles.

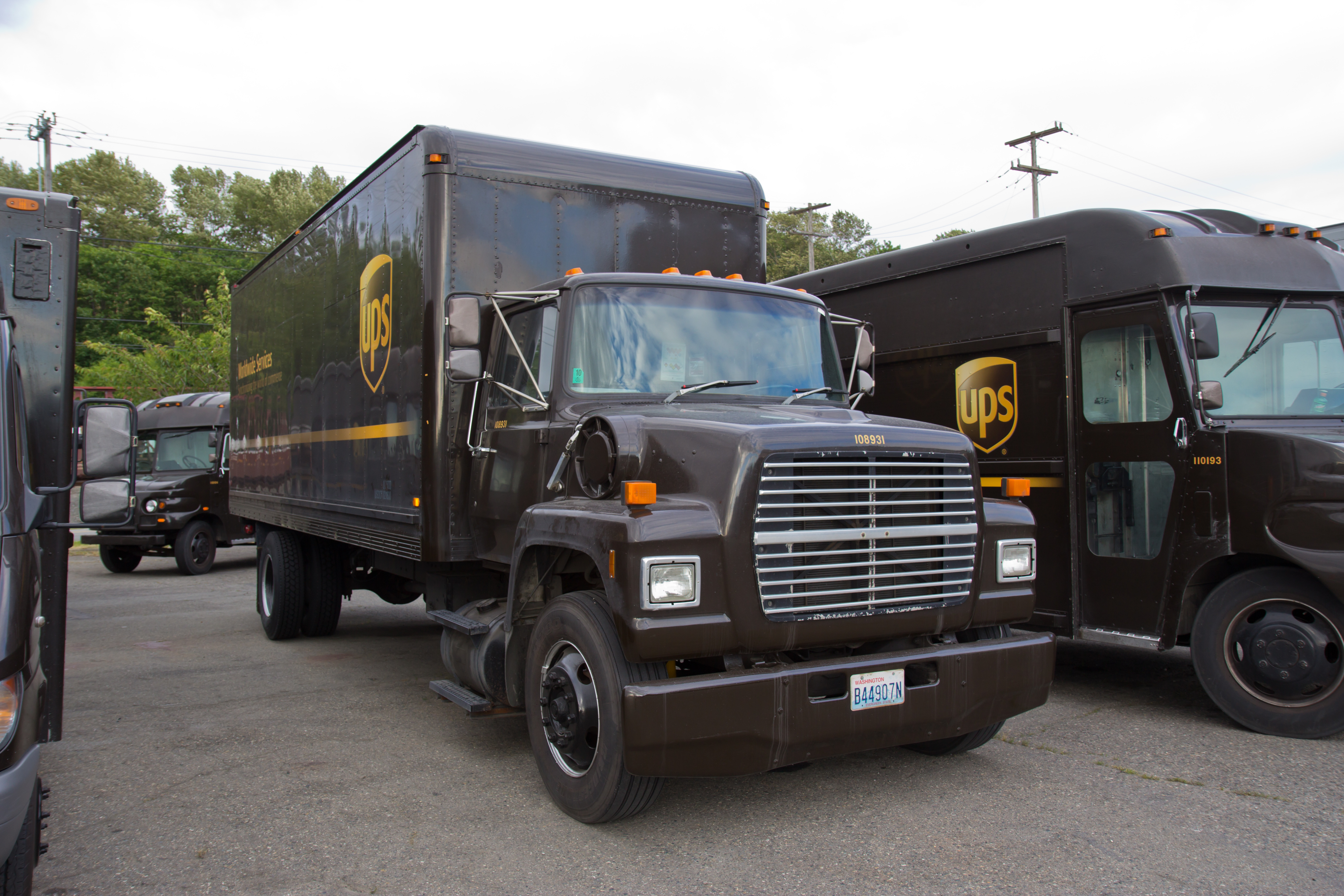
UPS 1990 Ford LN8000 in Seattle, Washington

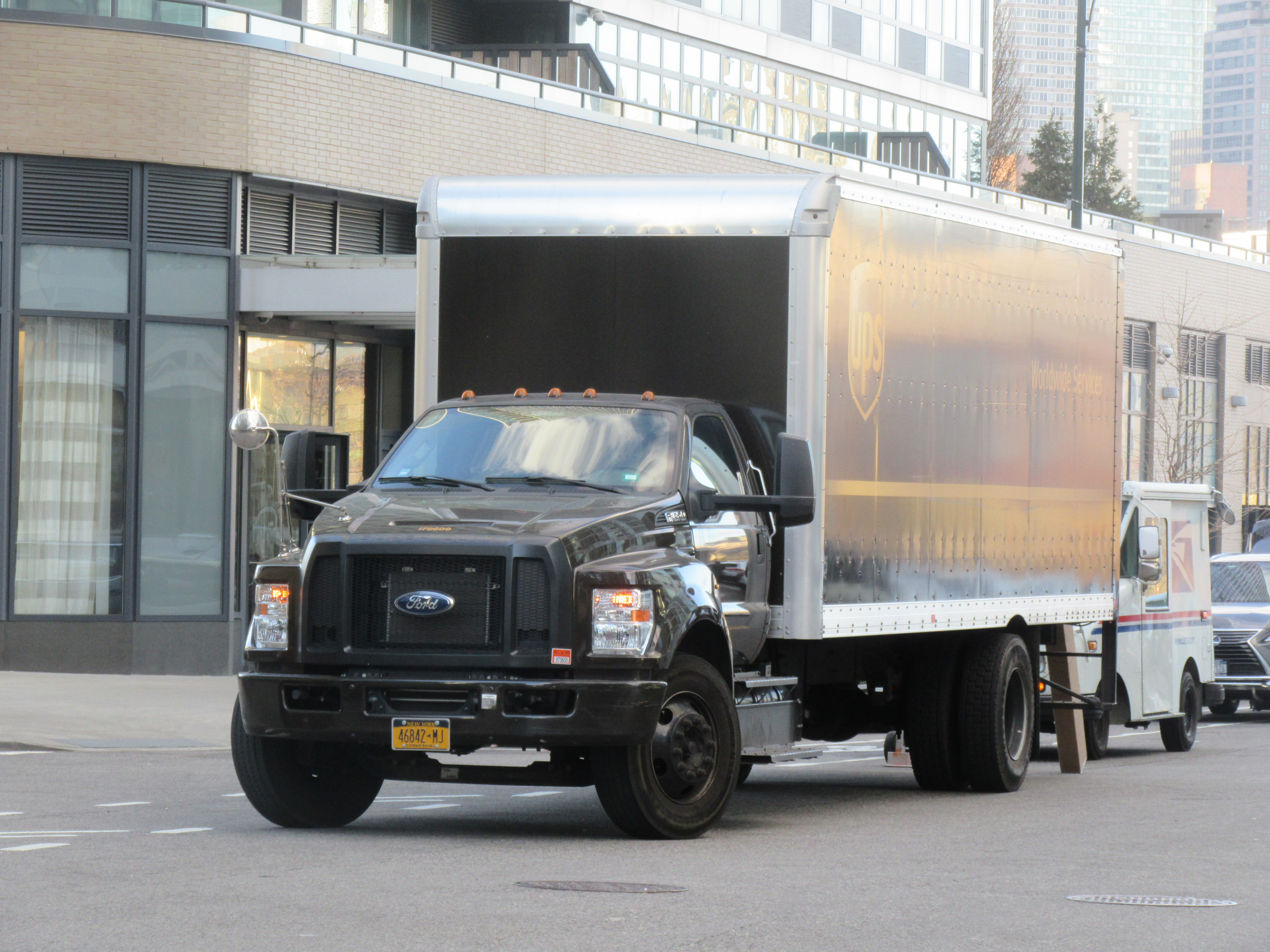
2017 Ford F-650 in New York City

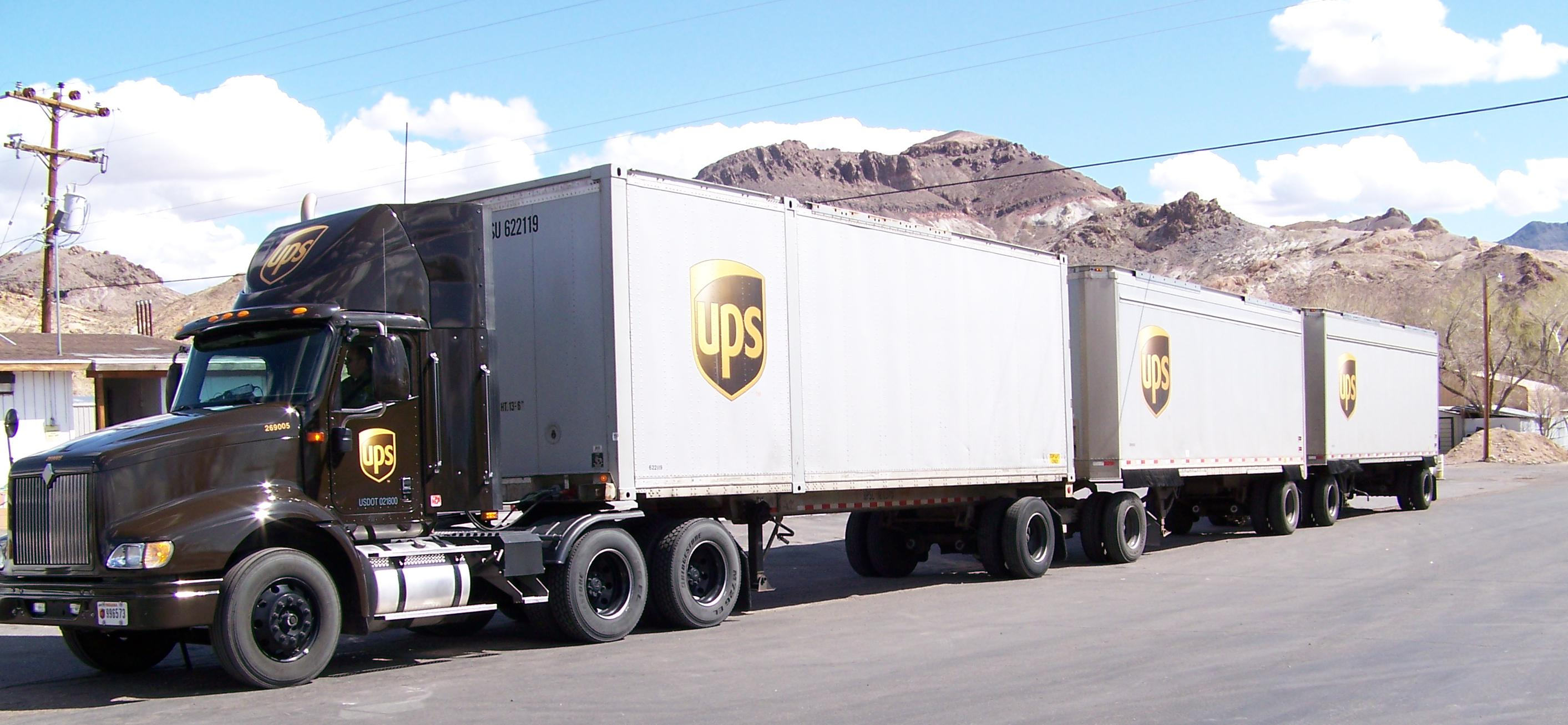
UPS International 9000 towing triple trailers in Beatty, Nevada

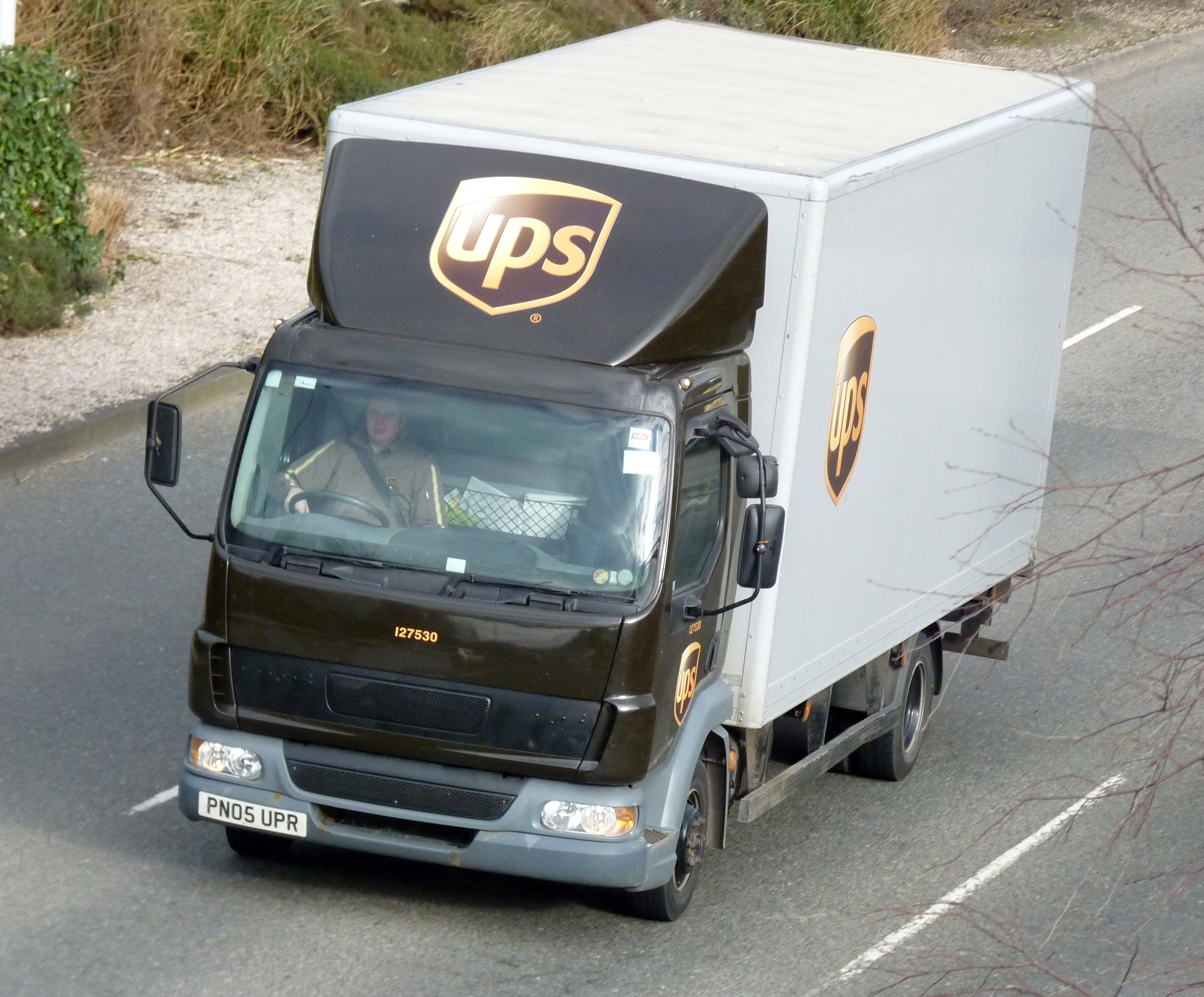
UPS DAF LF cabover straight truck in Plymouth, United Kingdom

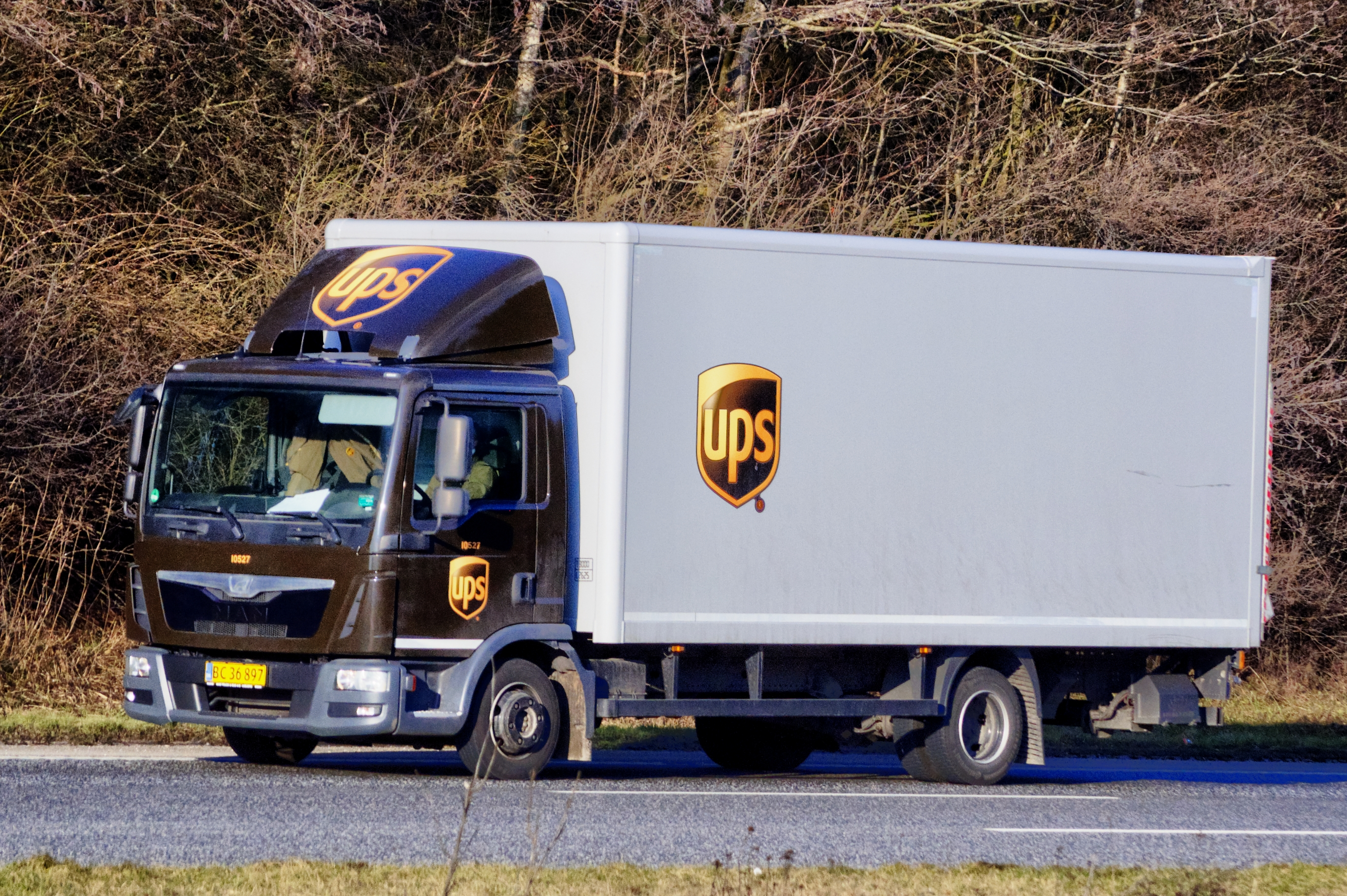
UPS MAN TGL truck in Denmark

=== Bicycles ===
In 2008, UPS started hiring bicycle delivery personnel in Vancouver, Washington, and in several cities in Oregon (Portland, Salem, Corvallis, Eugene, and Medford). In fall of 2018, UPS announced a new program in Seattle, Washington using pedal-assist electric cargo bikes (made by Portland-based Truck Trike) around Pike Place and other congested downtown areas. In Amsterdam UPS also uses Urban Arrow delivery bicycles for delivery via a granted concession.

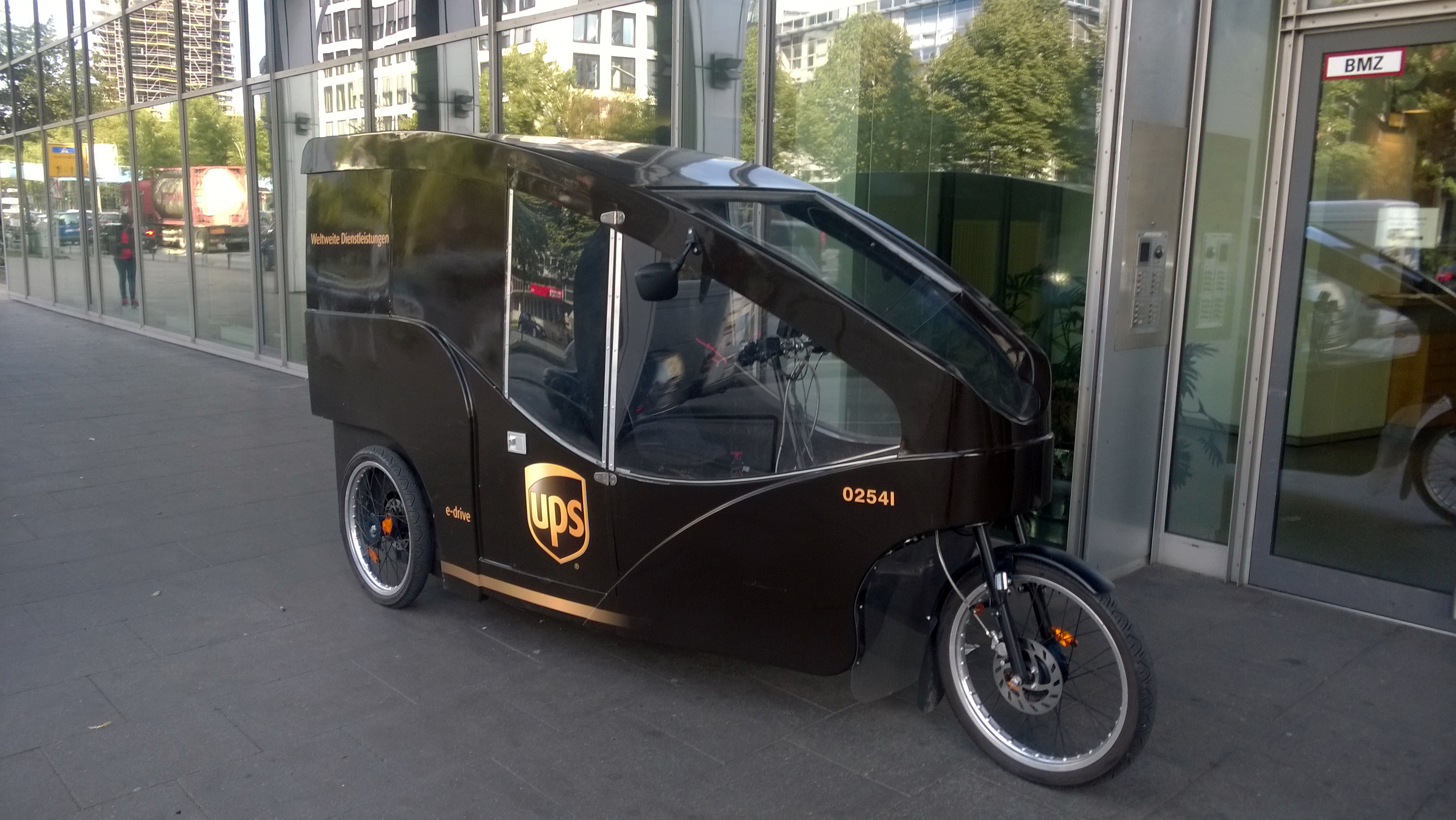
UPS e-drive electric-assisted cargo tricycle in Hamburg, Germany

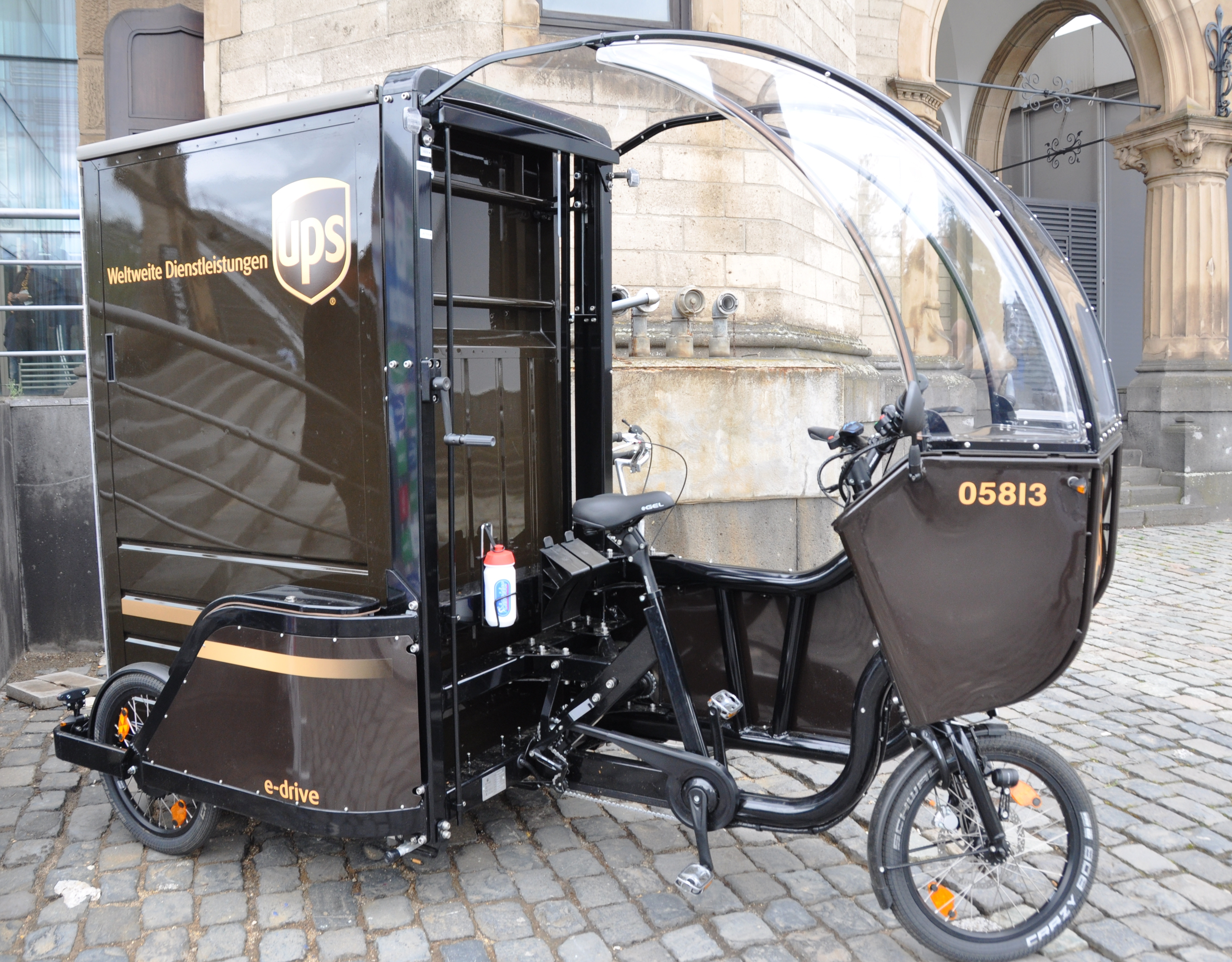
UPS e-drive electric-assisted cargo tricycle in Cologne, Germany

=== Cargo airline ===
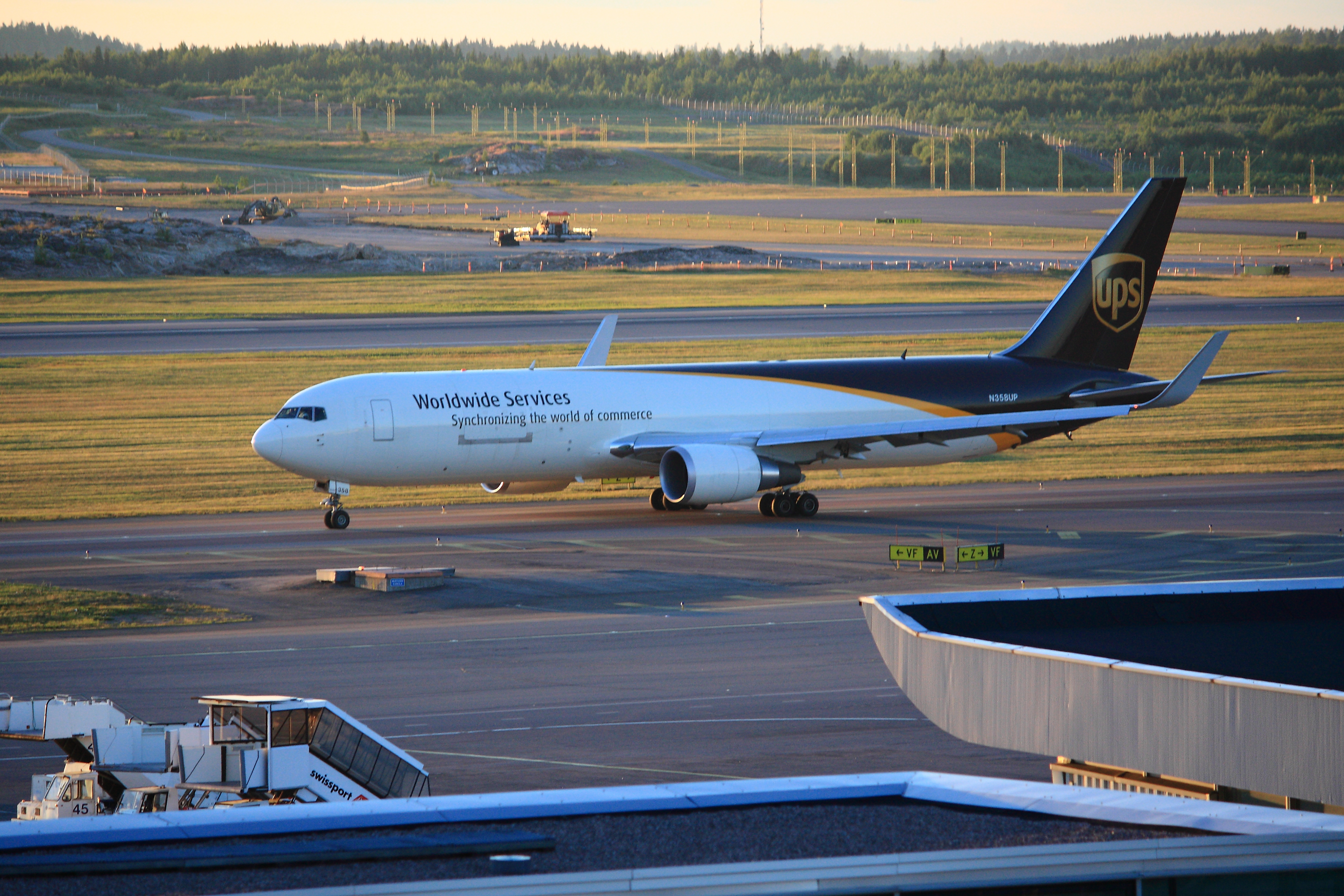
A Boeing 767-34AF/ER aircraft (N358UP) of United Parcel Service (UPS) at Helsinki-Vantaa Airport

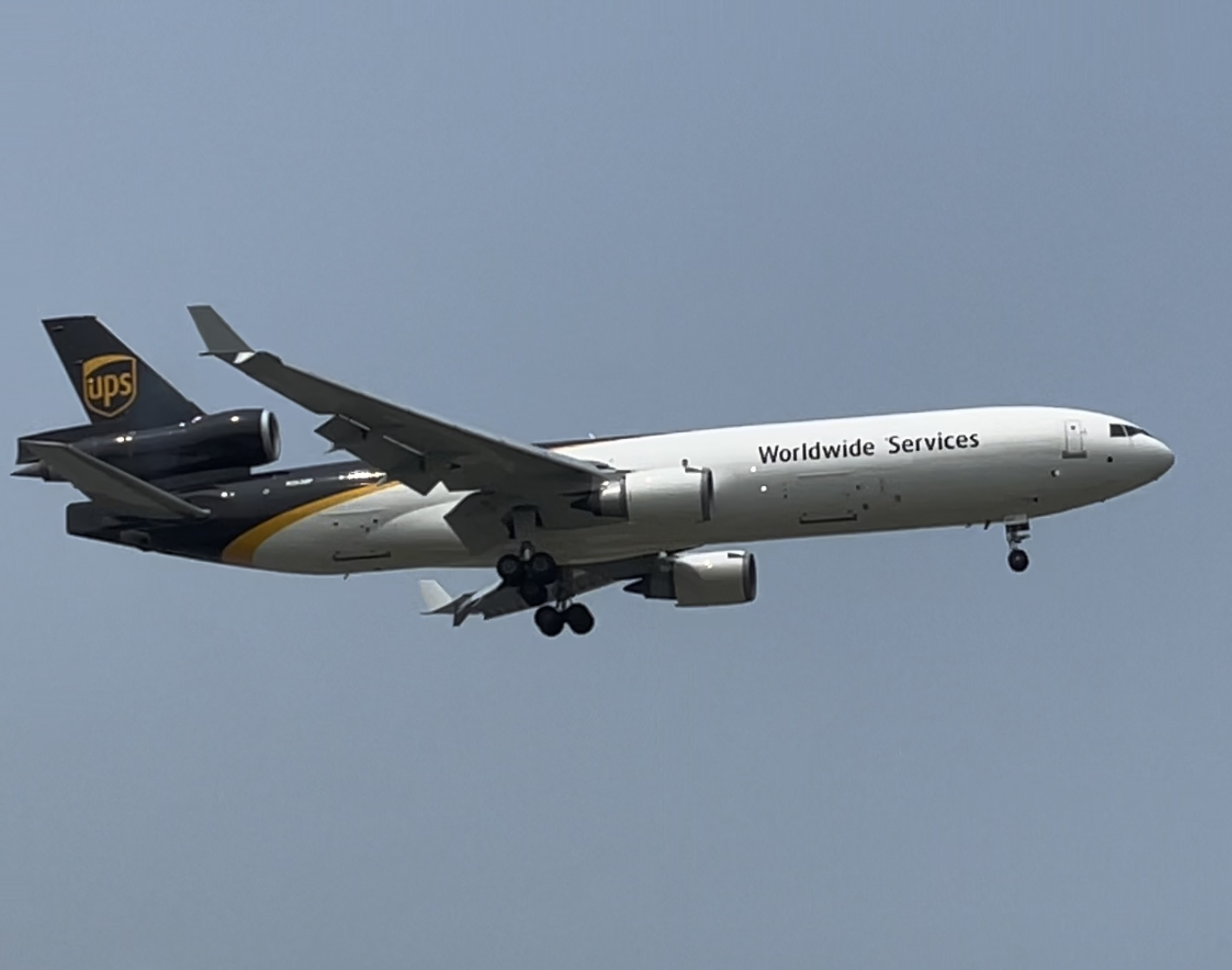
UPS McDonnell-Douglas MD-11 taking off at Louisville Muhammad Ali International Airport

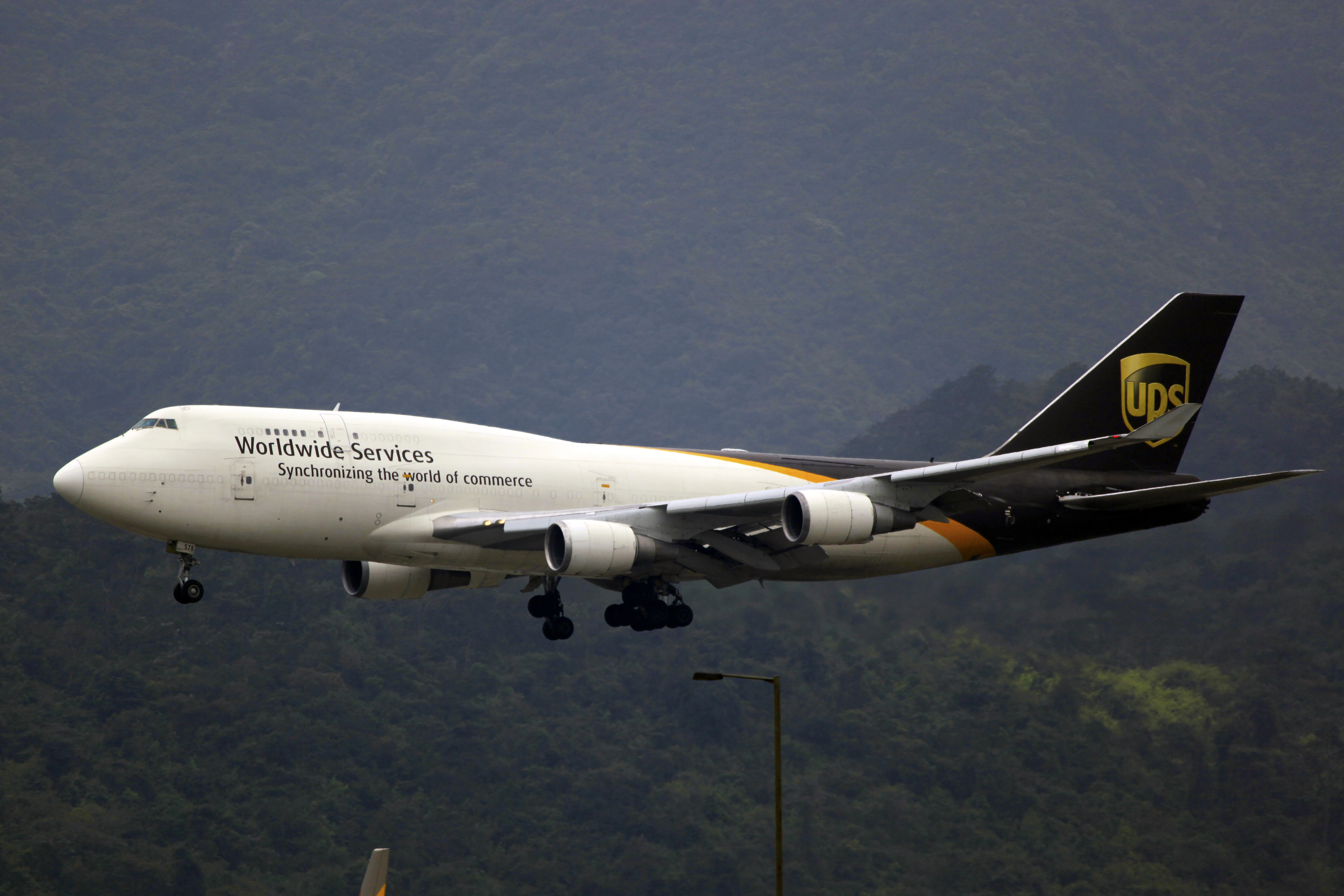
UPS Boeing 747-400BCF landing at Hong Kong International Airport in 2014

The fourth-largest cargo airline worldwide, UPS Airlines flies to over 800 destinations worldwide (the most of any airline, cargo or passenger). Formed in 1988, the airline is headquartered in Louisville, Kentucky (home to Worldport, its worldwide air hub) with additional hubs in the United States located in Ontario, California, Dallas, Texas, Rockford, Illinois and Philadelphia. Outside of North America, a hub in Cologne, Germany services Europe; in Asia, UPS Airlines operates a facility in Hong Kong and two hubs in mainland China.

Consisting of a fleet of nearly 300 aircraft (as of 2025), the airline competes directly against FedEx Express, facilitating air shipments by the company in over 200 countries and territories worldwide.

=== Cargo drone airline ===
UPS Flight Forward is a subsidiary which was formed in July 2019 and approved by FAA for Part 135 Standard certification, first ever to receive this specific type of certification. The FAA's Part 135 Standard certification allows company to operate an unlimited number of drones of any size (even allowing the cargo to exceed 55 pounds) even with an unlimited number of remote operators in command.

== Company brand ==
Versions of the UPS shield logo (left to right), the 1916 eagle logo, the c. 1937 logo, Paul Rand's 1961 version, and the modern 2003 rendering

=== Brown ===
The brown color that UPS uses on its vehicles and uniforms is called Pullman brown. Company founder James E. Casey originally wanted company vehicles to use a yellow paint scheme, but one of his partners, Charlie Soderstrom, stated that a yellow vehicle would be hard to keep clean and that Pullman railroad cars were brown for just that reason.

During the 2000s, the company used the familiarity of its color scheme in an advertising slogan: "What can Brown do for you?"

=== Font ===
UPS commissioned brand consultancy FutureBrand to develop its own font, UPS Sans, for use in marketing and communication material. UPS Sans was created by slightly altering certain parts of FSI FontShop International's font FF Dax without permission. This has resulted in an agreement between FSI FontShop International and FutureBrand to avoid litigation.

=== Reputation ===
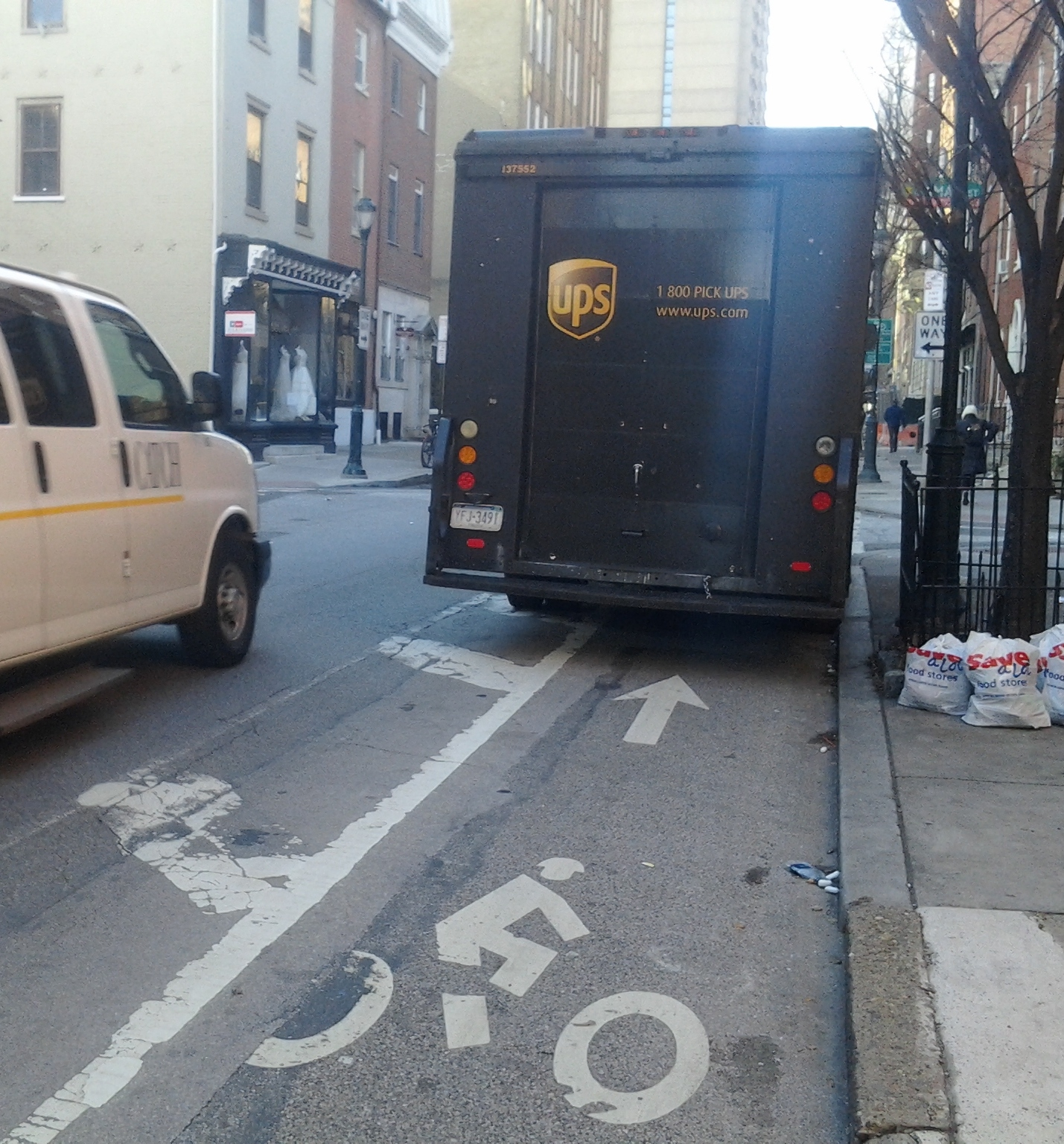
UPS truck illegally parked in a bike lane in Philadelphia

UPS has been criticized for its treatment of its workforce, including providing inadequate protections and sick leave during the COVID-19 pandemic.

The company has also been subject to perennial criticism for damaged, late, or otherwise mishandled packages.

Safe streets activists have attacked UPS, along with other parcel delivery services, for frequently illegally parking their vehicles in bike lanes while making deliveries, a practice that endangers cyclists. They were sued over it in New York in 2015, and criticized alongside peers in a letter from Washington, D.C.'s transportation agency in 2018.

== Environmental record ==
As of 2013, UPS has over 104,900 vehicles in operation worldwide including nearly 7,000 alternative fuel vehicles. In May 2008, UPS placed an order for 200 hybrid electric vehicles (adding to the 50 it had at that point) and 300 compressed natural gas (which are 20% more fuel efficient, and add to the 800 it already has) vehicles from Daimler Trucks North America. The company added 200 hybrid electric vehicles to its fleet in 2016.

UPS received a "striding" rating of 80 points out of 100 totals on the environmental scorecard by the Climate Counts Group for its efforts to lessen the company's impact on the environment. UPS has also been awarded the Clean Air Excellence Award by the United States Environmental Protection Agency because of the alternative fuel program it has developed. A few years later, the Environmental Protection Agency fined the UPS for not following environmental laws.

In October 2009, UPS became the first small-package carrier to offer customers the chance to buy carbon offsets to neutralize the greenhouse gas emissions generated by the transport of their packages. Although initially only available on ups.com and to high-volume shippers, they are now widely available through UPS shipping systems and UPS Ready third-party shipping systems.

=== Carbon footprint ===
UPS reported Total CO_{2}e emissions (Direct + Indirect) for the twelve months ending December 31, 2020, at 16,500 Kt (+1,546/+10% y-o-y). UPS aims to reach net zero emissions by 2050.

UPS's annual Total CO2e Emissions - Market-Based Scope 1 + Scope 2 (in kilotonnes)
Dec 2016	Dec 2017	Dec 2018	Dec 2019	Dec 2020
13,263	13,792	14,635	14,954	16,500

== See also ==
- Big Brown – 2008 Kentucky Derby and Preakness Stakes winner; named after the company
- Human Intervention Motivation Study
- MaxiCode – A UPS developed and utilized square barcode-like symbol that appears on their package label
