= Delivery Solutions =

American software company

- Type: Subsidiary
- Industry: Logistics, Software as a Service (SaaS)
- Founded: 2018; 8 years ago
- Founders: Arshaad Mirza, Manil Uppal
- Headquarters: Plano, Texas, United States
- Area served: United States, Canada, United Kingdom, Europe, Australia
- Products: Same-day delivery, curbside pickup, BOPIS, omnichannel delivery platform, post-purchase services
- Services: Retail logistics, delivery fleet aggregation, analytics, reverse logistics
- Parent: UPS
- Website: www.deliverysolutions.co

Delivery Solutions is an American-based software company that provides Software as a Service (SaaS) options to enterprise merchants, such as last-mile delivery, same-day delivery, curbside pickup, and Buy Online Pickup In-Store (BOPIS).

In May 2022, Delivery Solutions was acquired by United Parcel Service and became a subsidiary. It partners with Walmart, Sephora, Abercrombie & Fitch, ShopRite, and Total Wine & More, operating in North America, the U.K., Australia, and Europe.

== History ==
Delivery Solutions was founded in 2018 by Arshaad Mirza and Manil Uppal, who had previously started Lash Delivery, an alcohol delivery service. They saw an opportunity to create a platform that brought together different delivery fleets to help retailers improve their last-mile deliveries.

In 2019, Delivery Solutions launched its same-day delivery system and worked with Total Wine & More.

In 2020, the company added more features, including curbside pickup, BOPIS, order tracking, reverse logistics, and analytics. By 2021, Delivery Solutions had processed $660 million in orders. In May 2022, Delivery Solutions was acquired by UPS and became a subsidiary. Although it is now part of UPS, the company continues to operate under its original name and management. After the acquisition, the founders of Delivery Solutions, Arshaad Mirza and Manil Uppal, continued to lead the company until they exited in 2024.

== Overview ==
Delivery Solutions provides a platform for retailers to manage various delivery options like same-day delivery, curbside pickup, and BOPIS. The company's services help retailers improve their customer experience and reduce supply chain and distribution risks. Delivery Solutions serves a range of businesses, including retailers like Abercrombie & Fitch, Walmart, ShopRite, Total Wine & More, and Sephora. The company operates in the U.S., Canada, the U.K., Australia, and Europe.
