= SonicAir =

US logistics service company

SonicAir Logo

SonicAir, Inc. was an integrated logistics service company, providing Logistics Planning; Strategic Stocking, Returns Management, SmartCourier Field Repair, Depot Repair, Parts Distribution, and Transportation Services to its customers. Acquired by UPS in 1995, SonicAir was eventually absorbed into the UPS Logistics Group.

== History ==
Sonic Air Courier Inc. was originally founded by Ray Thurston in 1976 to provide same-day and off-hour shipment of time-critical parcels. The company name would later combine into one word, SonicAir.

Thurston's beginnings in the transportation industry go back to the age of thirteen when he worked as a bicycle messenger after school and summers for his father's messenger service. One year after finishing college, Ray's father died, and he assumed control of the business at twenty-three. After several failed attempts to purchase the business from his stepmother, Ray went on to form a new company, SonicAir Couriers, a same-day courier servicing the entire United States. Ray evolved SonicAir by adding warehousing, distribution, supply chain software and consulting to their services.

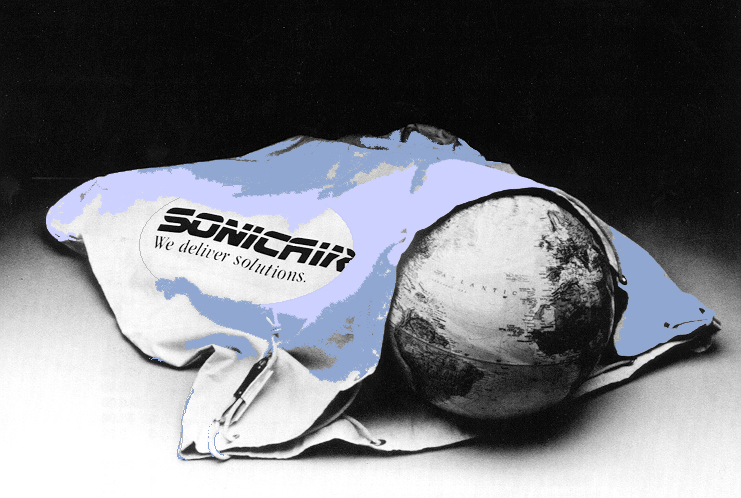
SonicAir ad element from the early 1990s.

Sonic Air Courier Inc., acquired Air Couriers International Inc. (ACI) in May 1984. SonicAir at the time was a 7 million dollar company acquiring a 19 million dollar company there were many challenges ahead and some difficult times. On time performance was only at 85%, and the company had experienced significant financial losses. SonicAir committed itself to the principles of quality improvement and management to turn the company around. The turnaround was so successful that SonicAir was named a "Great Comeback" by Success magazine in August 1990 and "Turnaround of the Year" in 1990 by Venture Capital Magazine.

SonicAir developed the Field Support Bank in 1984 as the company strategically located warehousing to complement its existing same-day service. The company continued to add services as the needs of its customers dictated.

SonicAir's Field Support Bank business continued to grow with great success for the next ten years attracting the attention of both the United Parcel Service (UPS) and Federal Express (FedEx).

In 1995, UPS acquired SonicAir. It was initially operated as an independently run UPS Logistics Group Company providing worldwide service parts logistics planning, transportation, central parts distribution, returns management, reverse logistics, SmartCourier Field Repair, depot repair and warehousing for after-sale, time-critical product support. In 1997 SonicAir would begin to be branded as a wholly owned subsidiary of UPS.

Growth as part of a UPS subsidiary was rapid, and in February 1999 SonicAir announced that it would be tripling the size of its Louisville operation.

On September 5, 2000, SonicAir became the UPS Logistics Group and many of the initial services it offered would eventually become UPS Express Critical.
