= John Rogers (cricketer, born 1860) =

English cricketer (1860–??)

Personal information
- Full name: John Pritchard Rogers
- Born: 10 March 1860; Bloxham, Oxfordshire, England
- Batting: Unknown
- Role: Wicket-keeper

Domestic team information
- Years: Team
- 1891: Middlesex

Career statistics
Competition	First-class
Matches	1
Runs scored	7
Batting average	7.00
100s/50s	0/0
Top score	7*
Catches/stumpings	1/0
- Source: Cricinfo, 20 January 2012

John Pritchard Rogers (10 March 1860 – date of death unknown) was an English cricketer. Rogers' batting style is unknown, though it is known he fielded as a wicket-keeper.

Rogers was born at Bloxham, Oxfordshire, the first child of farmer Robert Rogers and Hannah Pritchard. He was educated at All Saints Grammar School in Bloxham.

Rogers made a single first-class appearance for Middlesex against Surrey at The Oval in 1891. Middlesex made 86 in their first-innings, with Rogers ending the innings not out on 7, while in response, Surrey made 233 in their first-innings. In their second-innings, Middlesex made 144, with Rogers being dismissed for a duck by George Lohmann. In a season in which Middlesex experimented with a number of wicket-keepers, this match proved to be his only major appearance for the county.

He married Annie Wall in 1888 in Greenwich. In 1891, he was working as a school principal in London, at the Finchley House School for English and French Pupils. Prior to that, he was Head Mathematical Master of the Grange School in Eastbourne and First Master of London International College.
