= Jack Rogers (businessman) =

American businessman (1933–2026)

- Born: John W. Rogers; 1933 (age 92–93); United States
- Died: 2026 (aged 92–93)
- Education: Miami University
- Occupation: Businessperson
- Years active: 1957–1996
- Employer: United Parcel Service
- Known for: Former chairman and chief executive officer of United Parcel Service
- Term: May 1984 – November 1989
- Predecessor: George Lamb
- Successor: Kent C. "Oz" Nelson

John "Jack" Rogers is an American businessman. He is the retired chairman of the board and chief executive officer of United Parcel Service. He held this position from May 1984 to November 1989.

== Early life and education ==
Rogers graduated from Miami University in 1957 with a bachelor's degree in business administration. While at Miami, he became a brother of Delta Upsilon fraternity.

== Career ==
After graduating from Miami, Rogers started with UPS as a trainee in Cincinnati loading and delivering packages. He would eventually move into business roles, such as industrial engineering, personnel, and hub and delivery operations, before being promoted to division manager in Chicago.

Rogers continued to rise through the UPS ranks holding a number of management positions throughout the United States leading up to being appointed the national operations manager in January 1978 and being elected to the board of directors in 1979. Five years later, Jack became the chairman and chief executive officer in 1984.

The key highlight of his tenure was the start of international air service between the United States and six European countries in 1985.

Rogers stepped down as chairman in November 1989 and retired from active employment at the end of the year. He continued to serve as a director for an additional six years.
