= Jack Rogers (English footballer) =

English footballer (1895–1977)

Personal information
- Full name: John Rogers
- Date of birth: 20 June 1895
- Place of birth: Helston, England
- Date of death: 1977 (aged 81–82)
- Position: Forward

Senior career*
Years	Team	Apps	(Gls)
- Crystal Palace
1921–1922	Aberdare Athletic	59	(10)
1923–1924	Sunderland	7	(1)
1925	Norwich City	12	(4)
–	Newquay FC		
–	Helston British Legion		
- * Club domestic league appearances and goals

John Rogers (born 20 June 1895 in Helston, England) was a footballer who played in The Football League for Aberdare Athletic, Sunderland and Norwich City . He also played for Crystal Palace.
