= John Rogers (cricketer, born 1943) =

Australian cricketer (born 1943)

Personal information
- Born: 7 May 1943 (age 83); Gosford, New South Wales, Australia
- Source: ESPNcricinfo, 23 January 2017

John Rogers (born 7 May 1943) is an Australian former cricketer. He played four first-class and one List A matches for New South Wales between 1968/69 and 1969/70.

== See also ==
- List of New South Wales representative cricketers
