= Jack Rogers (cricketer) =

English cricketer (born 1998)

Personal information
- Full name: Oliver Jack Wright Rogers
- Born: 28 August 1998 (age 28); Richmond, London, England
- Batting: Right-handed
- Bowling: Leg break

Domestic team information
- Years: Team
- 2018–2019: Oxford University

Career statistics
| Competition | First-class |
|---|---|
| Matches | 2 |
| Runs scored | 13 |
| Batting average | 6.50 |
| 100s/50s | –/– |
| Top score | 13 |
| Balls bowled | 49 |
| Wickets | 1 |
| Bowling average | 13.00 |
| 5 wickets in innings | – |
| 10 wickets in match | – |
| Best bowling | 1/7 |
| Catches/stumpings | 2/– |
- Source: Cricinfo, 22 June 2020

Oliver Jack Wright Rogers (born 28 August 1998) is an English former first-class cricketer.

Rogers was born at Richmond in August 1998. He was educated at Eton College, before going up to St Edmund Hall, Oxford. While studying at Oxford, he made two appearances in first-class cricket for Oxford University against Cambridge University in The University Matches of 2018 and 2019, scoring 13 runs and taking a single wicket.
