= Jack Rogers (retailer) =

American retail footwear company

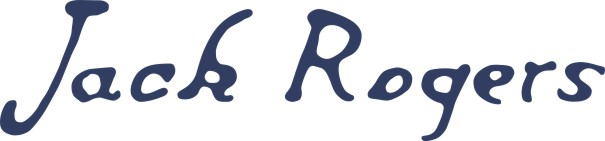
- Industry: Retail
- Founded: Palm Beach, FL, 1960
- Headquarters: New York, New York, U.S.
- Area served: United States
- Products: Footwear, Accessories
- Website: www.jackrogersusa.com

Jack Rogers is a retail women's footwear company that was founded in 1960 in Palm Beach, Florida and is now headquartered in New York, New York. Jack Rogers offers sandals, flats, sneakers, boots, and booties, as well as men’s and kids’ shoes, and accessories.

Known for its signature sandal, the Classic Jack, this style is characterized by whipstitched leather trim and features an iconic rondelle design. The brands classic line of sandals are commonly referred to as "Jacks" and are available in a range of metallic and bright colored leathers. They can also be in customized in 250+ different color combinations and can be personalized with an embroidered monogram.

== History ==
During a trip to Capri, Italy, Jackie Kennedy came across a pair of flat leather sandals with whipstitched detailing that she loved and decided to bring them back to her local cobbler in Palm Beach, Florida for him to replicate in various colors. From there, the Jack Rogers brand was born.

In April 2017, Jack Rogers partnered with Draper James to launch three different styles of the classic Jack Rogers sandal.

Today, Jack Rogers’ shoes are sold at more than 400 high-end independent retailers and department stores including Nordstrom, Bergdorf Goodman, Bloomingdales, Neiman Marcus, and Belk. In addition to its online store, the company currently has three brick and mortar store locations in Atlanta, Charlotte, NC, and New York City, its flagship store.
