= John Rodgers =

John Rodgers may refer to:

== Military ==
- John Rodgers (colonel) (1728–1791), colonel during the Revolutionary War and owner of Rodgers Tavern, Perryville, Maryland
- John Rodgers (naval officer, born 1772), U.S. naval officer during the War of 1812, first naval John Rodgers
- John Rodgers (admiral) (1812–1882), naval officer during the Civil War, son of the above
- John Rodgers (naval officer, born 1881) (1881–1926), naval officer during World War I and aviation pioneer, great-grandson of the first naval John Rodgers
- Six ships, three USS John Rodgers and three USS Rodgers, were named for the above officers

== Music ==
- John Rodgers (musician) (born 1962), Australian composer and musician
- Johnny Rodgers (singer) (born 1974), American singer-songwriter

== Politics ==
- Sir John Rodgers, 1st Baronet (1906–1993), British Conservative MP for Sevenoaks
- John M. Rodgers (1928–2012), Pennsylvania politician
- John S. Rodgers (born 1965), American politician in Vermont

== Sports ==
- John Rodgers (American football) (1960–1995), American football player
- John Rodgers (boxer) (born 1947), Irish boxer
- Johnny Rodgers (born 1951), American football player

== Religious clergy ==
- John Rodgers (clergyman) (1727-1811)
- John Rodgers (New Zealand bishop) (1915–1997), missionary bishop
- John Rodgers (theologian) (1930–2022), American Anglican theologian and bishop

== Other ==
- John Kearney Rodgers (1793–1851), American surgeon
- John Rodgers (geologist) (1914–2004), American geologist

== See also ==
- John Rogers (disambiguation)
