= Jonathan L. Rogers =

American accounting scholar

Jonathan L. Rogers is an American accounting scholar who holds the Tisone Endowed Chair of Accounting at the University of Colorado-Boulder's Leeds School of Business.

== Early career ==
Rogers received his bachelor's degree in economics and finance from the University of Texas at Austin in 1996. Subsequently, he worked as a certified management accountant (CMA) and a certified financial manager (CFM). He then entered the PhD in accounting from the Wharton School of Business at the University of Pennsylvania, receiving his PhD in 2005.

Rogers started his academic career at the University of Chicago Booth School of Business, serving as an instructor, assistant professor, and associate professor. In 2013, he moved to the University of Colorado Leeds School of Business as an associate professor with tenure. He was subsequently promoted to professor and appointed to the Tisone Endowed Chair.

== Research ==
Rogers studies how accounting information affects the efficiency of capital markets. For capital markets to provide the most benefit to society, they require timely and high-quality information flows that enable investors to identify the most promising investments. Inaccurate or low-quality information distorts investment decisions. Rogers studies this information flows, examining: a) strategic communication by firms and managers via voluntary disclosure, b) the role of media in affecting stock prices and in exacerbating or mitigating insider trading advantages in comparison with the average investor, and c) the employment market for ex-CEOs of publicly traded companies.

== Most-cited papers ==
- Rogers JL, Stocken PC. Credibility of management forecasts. The Accounting Review. 2005 Oct;80(4):1233-60. According to Google Scholar, it has been cited 999 times.
- Rogers JL, Van Buskirk A, Zechman SL. Disclosure tone and shareholder litigation. The Accounting Review. 2011 Nov;86(6):2155-83. According to Google Scholar, this article has been cited 362 times
- Rogers JL, Van Buskirk A. Shareholder litigation and changes in disclosure behavior. Journal of Accounting and Economics. 2009 Mar 1;47(1-2):136-56. According to Google Scholar, this article has been cited 333 times
