= Jack Rogers (Australian footballer) =

Australian rules footballer (1913–1997)

Personal information
- Full name: Jack Edgecombe Rogers
- Born: 30 March 1913; Maryborough, Victoria
- Died: 26 December 1997 (aged 84); Springvale, Victoria
- Original team: Beulah
- Height: 183 cm (6 ft 0 in)
- Weight: 77 kg (170 lb)
- Position: Follower

Playing career^{1}
Years	Club	Games (Goals)
1940–41	St Kilda	4 (0)
- ^{1} Playing statistics correct to the end of 1941.

Jack Edgecombe Rogers (30 March 1913 – 26 December 1997) was an Australian rules footballer who played with St Kilda in the Victorian Football League (VFL).

Rogers served in the Royal Australian Air Force for the duration of World War II.
