= John Rogers (cricketer, born 1858) =

Australian cricketer

Personal information
- Full name: John Edward Rogers
- Born: 8 February 1858; Botany Bay, New South Wales
- Died: 8 July 1935 (aged 77); South Melbourne, Victoria, Australia
- Batting: Right-handed
- Bowling: Right-arm fast-medium
- Role: All-rounder

Domestic team information
- Years: Team
- 1891: Victoria

Career statistics
Competition	FC
Matches	2
Runs scored	11
Batting average	5.50
100s/50s	0/0
Top score	6
Balls bowled	321
Wickets	3
Bowling average	40.66
5 wickets in innings	0
10 wickets in match	0
Best bowling	2/96
Catches/stumpings	0/-
- Source: CricketArchive, 10 July 2013

John Edward Rogers (8 February 1858 – 8 July 1935) was an Australian cricketer who played two first-class matches for Victoria during the early 1890s. Rogers was born in Sydney, New South Wales, though little else is known of his early life, including how and when he came to reside in the neighbouring colony of Victoria. A right-arm fast bowler, he made his first-class debut against Tasmania in March 1891, at the end of the 1890–91 season. He took a single wicket in a low-scoring affair, with John Carlton (5/26 and 7/53) and Norman Rock (5/21) dominating for Victoria and Tasmania, respectively. Rogers' second and final match for Victoria came at the beginning of the following season, against South Australia at the Adelaide Oval. He took 2/96 in South Australia's only innings, in a match notable for George Giffen's all-round dominance—Giffen scored 271 runs out of a total of 562 all out, and then took 16 wickets (9/96 and 7/70) to allow South Australia to win by an innings and 164 runs. Rogers played no further matches at a high level, and died in Melbourne in July 1935, aged 77.

== See also ==
- List of Victoria first-class cricketers
