= John Daniel Rogers =

American curator and archaeologist (born 1954)

- Born: October 30, 1954 (age 71)
- Education: University of Chicago, University of Oklahoma
- Scientific career
- Fields: Archaeology
- Doctoral advisor: Raymond D. Fogelson

John Daniel Rogers (born October 30, 1954) is an American archaeologist who is Curator of Archaeology in the Department of Anthropology at the National Museum of Natural History (NMNH) at the Smithsonian Institution in Washington, DC. He is well known for his archaeological work with the Spiro Mounds in Oklahoma and other sites in the southeastern United States, and has studied the rise of chiefdoms and empires across the world.

His work has often focused on households as a bridge to understanding the structure of complex societies and the interrelatedness of settlement, subsistence and political structures on a macroscopic scale. He has also done significant research on interpreting the processes of culture contact and colonization at the edges of empires by comparing data from a variety of areas, including the Great Plains, Central Mexico, the Caribbean, and Inner Asia.

His recent work explores the human impact on the environment as evidenced by archaeology. Through National Science Foundation grants, Dr. Rogers and collaborators at George Mason University are using agent-based simulations to model the rise and fall of Inner Asian empires. Eventually, the team will explore long-term human impacts on the environment, especially the sustainability and resilience of different social systems.

== Education ==
Ph.D. 1987, University of Chicago (Anthropology) Dissertation: Culture Contact and Material Change: Arikara and Euro-American Interactions in the Eighteenth and Nineteenth Centuries

M.A. 1982, University of Oklahoma (Anthropology) Thesis: Social Ranking and Change in the Harlan and Spiro Phases of Eastern Oklahoma

B.A. 1976, University of Oklahoma (Anthropology, minor in Zoology)

== Career ==
Rogers has been a Curator of Archaeology at the National Museum of Natural History since 1989. He was the Chairman of the Department of Anthropology at NMNH from 2005 to 2010, and co-chair from 2000 to 2002. He has also served as the Head of the Division of Archaeology from 1992 to 1999 and from 2004 to 2005.

In 1994, the Society for American Archaeology honored him with the Presidential Recognition Award. The National Museum of Natural History awarded Rogers the Science Achievement Award in 2005 for his publication, Archaeology and the Interpretation of Colonial Encounters, and again in 2008 for his article, The Contingencies of State Formation in Eastern Inner Asia

Rogers teaches anthropology and museum studies at The George Washington University, where he has been an adjunct professor since 2003. His courses focus on museum anthropology and the interaction between museums and the public. His course Anthropology in the Museum underscores the rich archaeological and ethnographic resources in museum collections, and each student undertakes a major collections-based research project.

Currently, Rogers is the Co-PI on a multi-year National Science Foundation (NSF) grant, Cyber-Enabled Understanding of Complexity in Socio-Ecological Systems Using Computational Thinking with his colleagues, Claudio Cioffi-Revilla, (PI), Sean Luke (Co-PI), and Paul Schopf (Co-PI), which follows their work on a previous NSF grant, Agent-Based Dynamics of Social Complexity: Modeling Adaptive Behavior and Long-Term Change in Inner Asia, from 2006 to 2010.
