= Roger =

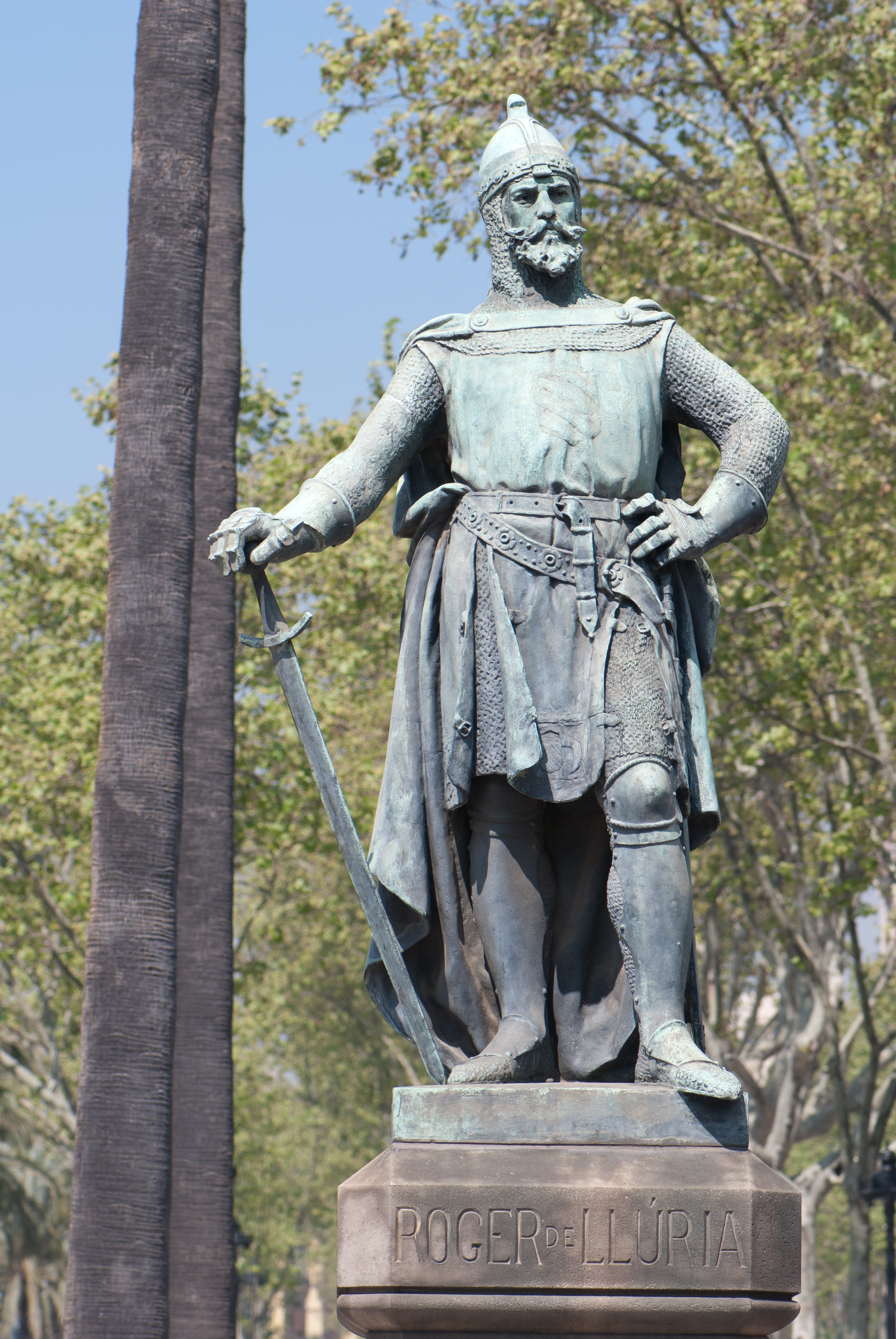
- Roger of Lauria
- Pronunciation: /ˈrɒdʒər, ˈroʊdʒər/
- Gender: Male
- Language: English

Origin
- Language: Germanic
- Derivation: hrōd + gār, gēr
- Meaning: "fame", "renown" + "spear", "lance" literally - "famous spear"

Other names
- Variant forms: Rogér, Rog, Rodger, Rogelio, Rüdiger, Rutger
- See also: Robert, Rudolph, Rodney, Roderick

Roger is a masculine given name and a surname. The given name is derived from the Old French personal names Roger and Rogier. These names are of Germanic origin, derived from the elements hrōd, χrōþi ("fame", "renown", "honour") and gār, gēr ("spear", "lance") (Hrōþigēraz). The name was introduced into England by the Normans. In Normandy, the Frankish name had been reinforced by the Old Norse cognate Hróðgeirr. The name introduced into England replaced the Old English cognate Hroðgar. Roger became a very common given name during the Middle Ages. A variant form of the given name Roger that is closer to the name's origin is Rodger.

== Slang and other uses ==
Hodge, a word meaning farm labourer or English rural dweller, is derived from Middle English "Hoge", a nickname of Roger. In Under Milk Wood, Dylan Thomas writes "jolly, rodgered" suggesting both the sexual double entendre and the pirate term "Jolly Roger". This was because from c. 1650 up to c. 1870, Roger was British slang for the word penis, and as a verb, intercourse. In 19th-century England, Roger was slang for another term, the cloud of toxic green gas that swept through the chlorine bleach factories periodically.

"Roger" is a standard procedure word in two-way radio communication, meaning that a message has been received. This usage originated during World War II, during which time British and American military spelling alphabets used "Roger" to represent the letter "R", which itself was the abbreviation for "Received". While the NATO phonetic alphabet replaced the previous military alphabet's "Roger" with "Romeo" in 1949, "Roger" has remained standard as the abbreviation for "Received", as it had become recognizable to civilian professionals and laypeople.

== Spellings ==
The following forenames are related to the English given name Roger:

- Arabic: روجر, romanized: Rōjar, Rōjir
- Alt. Arabic: روجيه, romanized: Rōjeh
- Belarusian: Роджэр, romanized: Rodžer
- Catalan: Roger
- Simplified Chinese: 罗杰; traditional Chinese: 羅渣; pinyin: Luó jié
- Croatian: Ruđer, Rogerije
- Dutch: Rutger, Rogier
- Faroese: Róar
- Filipino: Rogelio
- French: Roger
- Galician: Roxerio, Roxelio
- German: Rüdiger, Roger
- Greek: Ρογήρος, romanized: Rogéros, Rógi̱ros
- Gujarati: રોજર, romanized: Rōjara
- Hebrew: רוג׳ר, romanized: Rojer
- Hindi: रॉजर, romanized: Rŏjara
- Hungarian: Rezső, Rogerios
- Irish: Ruairí
- Icelandic: Hróar, Hróðgeir, Ragnar
- Indonesian: Roger
- Italian: Ruggero, Roggero, Ruggeri, Ruggiero, Rugiero
- Japanese: ロジャー, ロゲル, romanized: Rojā, Rogeru
- Kannada: ರೋಜರ್, romanized: Rōjar
- Korean: 로저; RR: Rojeo
- Kurdish: راجەر, romanized: Racer
- Latin: Rogerius
- Macedonian: Роџер, romanized: Rodžer
- Malayalam: റോജർ, romanized: Roger
- Manx: Roree
- Mongolian: Рожер, romanized: Rojyer
- Nepali: रोजर, romanized: Rōjara
- Norwegian: Roar, Roger
- Occitan: Rogièr, Rotger
- Persian: راجر, romanized: Rājər
- Polish: Roger, Gerek
- Portuguese: Rogério
- Punjabi: ਰੋਜ਼ਰ, romanized: Rōzara
- Russian: Роджер, romanized: Ródžer, Rodzher
- Serbian: Руђер, romanized: Ruđer
- Slovene: Rogerij
- Spanish: Rogelio
- Swedish: Roar, Roger, Rutger
- Tamil: ரோஜர், romanized: Rōjar
- Telugu: రోజర్, romanized: Rōjar
- Thai: โรเจอร์, romanized: Rochoe
- Ukrainian: Роджер, romanized: Rodzher
- Urdu: راجر, romanized: Rājər
- Welsh: Rhosser, Roger
- Yiddish: ראַדזשער, romanized: Radzher

== People ==
=== Given name ===
==== Medieval period ====
See also, and for people with these names

==== Kings and rulers ====
- Hrothgar, semi-legendary Danish king living around the early sixth century AD
- Roger I of Sicily, Norman ruler of Sicily
- Roger II of Sicily (1095–1154), Norman King of Sicily and Africa, one of the principal commanders of the Second Crusade
- Roger III of Sicily (1175–1193), briefly King of Sicily

==== Others ====
- Roger, Archbishop of Patras (in post 1337–1347)
- Roger (Archdeacon of Barnstaple) (in post from 1155)
- Roger (archbishop of Benevento) (died 1221)
- Roger (bishop of Ross) (died c. 1350)
- Roger (larderer) (died 1102), Bishop-elect of Hereford
- Roger Borsa (1060/61–1111), Norman Duke of Apulia and Calabria
- Roger (son of Dagobert) (fl. 1098–1108), Norman magnate who served the Byzantine empire
- Roger I. de Sentes, 12th century French bishop
- Roger I Trencavel (died 1150), Viscount of Carcassonne
- Roger I de Fézensaguet (1190–1245), Viscount of Fézensaguet
- Roger I of Carcassonne (died 1012), Count of Carcassonne
- Roger I of Tosny (died c. 1040), Norman nobleman
- Roger II Trencavel (died 1194), Viscount of Carcassonne
- Roger III, Duke of Apulia (1118–1148), Duke of Apulia, Sicily
- Roger IV, Count of Foix (died 1265)
- Roger IV, Duke of Apulia (1152–1161)
- Roger of Lauria (c. 1245–1305), Italian admiral
- Roger Bacon, English philosopher
- Roger Bigod of Norfolk (died 1107), Norman knight who participated in the Norman Conquest of England
- Roger Frugardi (c. 1140 – c. 1195), Salernitan surgeon
- Roger Mortimer, 4th Earl of March (1374–1398)
- Roger Niger (c. 1173–1241), Bishop of London
- Roger Norreis (died c. 1224), Abbot of Evesham
- Roger of Salisbury (died 1139), also known as Roger le Poer, Norman Bishop of Salisbury and Lord Chancellor and Lord Keeper of England
- Roger of Worcester from 1163 to 1179

==== Modern era ====
- Roger José de Noronha Silva (born 1972), Brazilian football goalkeeper
- Roger Galera Flores (born 1978), Brazilian football attacking midfielder
- Roger Rodrigues da Silva (born 1985), Brazilian football manager and former player
- Roger Junio Rodrigues Ferreira (born 1996), Brazilian football midfielder
- Roger Dias Fernandes (born 2008), Brazilian football midfielder
- Roger Adams, American Nobel Prize organic chemist
- Roger Ailes, American television executive, chairman and CEO of Fox News
- Roger Albert, American politician
- Roger Allers (1949–2026), American filmmaker
- Roger Anderson, American football player
- Roger Angell (1920–2022), American writer and editor for The New Yorker
- Roger Ashton (footballer), Welsh footballer
- Roger Attfield (born 1939), Canadian thoroughbred horse trainer and owner and an inductee of both the Canadian and United States horseracing Halls of Fame
- Roger Avary, Canadian producer, screenwriter and director
- Roger Ballen, American artist working in South Africa
- Roger Bannister (1929–2018), British athlete, first man to run the four-minute mile
- Roger "Syd" Barrett, founder of Pink Floyd
- Roger Bart, American actor and singer
- Roger Berrio, Colombian weightlifter
- Roger Binny, Indian cricketer
- Roger Black (born 1966), English former athlete
- Roger Joseph Boscovich, Croatian-Ragusan physicist, astronomer, mathematician, philosopher, diplomat, poet, and Jesuit
- Roger Boylan, American writer
- Roger Buckley (1937–2020), American historian
- Roger Burnley (born 1966), British businessman, former CEO of Asda
- Roger C. Carmel, American character actor
- Roger A. Caras, American wildlife photographer and writer
- Roger Carter (disambiguation), multiple people
- Roger Casement, Irish patriot, poet, revolutionary, and British diplomat
- Roger Chaffee, American astronaut
- Roger Chan, the bus uncle
- Roger Chao, Australian explorer and mountain climber
- Roger Christian (songwriter) (1934–1991), American radio personality and songwriter
- Roger Clarke (rugby union administrator), British rugby administrator
- Roger Clemens, baseball player
- Roger Colglazier (born 1950), American sprinter
- Roger Cook (journalist), British journalist
- Roger Corman, American film director, producer, and actor
- Roger Craig (baseball), baseball player
- Roger Craig (American football), American football player
- Roger Craig Smith (born 1975), American voice actor
- Roger Cumberland (1894-1938), American Presbyterian missionary killed in Iraq
- Roger Daltrey, lead singer of British rock band The Who
- Roger Davis (television actor), American actor
- Roger O. DeBruler (1934–2017), Justice of the Indiana Supreme Court
- Roger DeJordy (1937–2019), Canadian ice hockey player
- Roger Delgado, British actor
- Roger DeVries, English footballer
- Roger Djikisna (born 1942), Chadian politician
- Roger Dobkowitz, American television producer, statistics expert for The Price is Right
- Roger Donaldson, New Zealand filmmaker
- Roger Dowdeswell (born 1944), Rhodesian tennis player
- Roger Ebert (1942–2013), American film critic and writer
- Roger Guy English, American businessman and world record holder
- Roger M. Enoka, American neurophysiologist
- Roger Facon (born 1950), French writer
- Roger Federer, Swiss tennis player
- Roger W. Ferguson, Jr., American CEO and former Federal Reserve official
- Roger C. Field, British inventor and industrial designer
- Roger Fortin, Canadian boxer
- Roger Frampton, Australian jazz musician
- Roger Galante, Canadian musician
- Roger García Junyent, Spanish football player
- Roger Gibbon, Trinidad and Tobago track cyclist
- Roger Glover, Welsh/English bassist, keyboardist, songwriter, and record producer
- Roger Godement, French mathematician
- Roger Goldammer, Canadian bikebuilder
- Roger Goodell, commissioner of the NFL
- Roger Gorayeb, Filipino volleyball coach and former college player
- Roger Guerreiro, Polish football player of Brazilian descent
- Roger Habsch (born 1979), Belgian para-athlete who specializes in sprints
- Roger Haddad (born 1978), Swedish politician
- Roger Hall (disambiguation), several people
- Roger Hamby (born 1943), American racing car driver
- Roger Heinkelé (1913–2001), French diver
- Roger Hodgman, Australian stage and television director
- Roger Hodgson, British vocalist and songwriter from Supertramp
- Roger Houde (born 1938), Canadian politician
- Roger Howarth, American actor
- Roger Ilegems, Belgian track cyclist and road bicycle racer
- Roger Ingram, American trumpeter, educator, and author
- Roger Jackson (rower), Canadian rower and academic
- Roger Jackson (wide receiver), American football player
- Roger L. Jackson, American actor
- Roger Jouret, birth name of Plastic Bertrand, Belgian singer, musician and television presenter
- Roger Karlsson, Swedish murderer
- Roger Kettlewell, Canadian football player
- Roger Keyes, 1st Baron Keyes, Royal Navy officer prominent in World War I, and Member of Parliament
- Roger Kibbe (1939–2021), American serial killer
- Roger Kiew, known professionally as Roger Kool, Singaporean DJ
- Roger Kimmerly, Canadian politician
- Roger Köppel, Swiss journalist
- Roger Kwok, Hong Kong television actor and former singer
- Roger Machado Marques, Brazilian football player
- Roger Lloyd-Pack, British actor
- Rogério Manganelli, Brazilian-American bass guitarist for Less Than Jake, known as Roger Lima
- Roger Manvell, first director of the British Film Academy
- Roger Maris (1934–1985), baseball player
- Roger Mason Jr, American basketball player
- Roger Mayweather (1961–2020), American boxer
- Roger McBride (born 1968), American musician known by his stage name King T
- Roger McCreary (born 2000), American football player
- Roger McGuinn, American singer-songwriter, guitarist for The Byrds
- Roger McMurrin, American conductor
- Roger Michell (1956–2021), South African-born British film director
- Roger Milla, Cameroon footballer
- Roger Miller, American musician
- Roger Mills (racewalker), English race walker
- Roger Monroe, Trinidad and Tobago politician
- Roger Moore (1927–2017), English actor, best known for playing James Bond between 1972 and 1985.
- Roger Moreira, Brazilian musician
- Roger Moret (1949–2020), Puerto Rican baseball player
- Roger E. Mosley, American actor
- Roger Mudd (1928–2021), American TV journalist
- Roger Muñoz, Nicaraguan basketball player
- Roger Myerson, American economist and professor
- Roger Neubauer (born 1938), French water polo player
- Roger Norrington (1934–2025), English conductor
- Roger Penrose, English mathematical physicist
- Roger Penske, American businessman
- Roger Touhy (1898–1959), Irish American mob boss
- Roger Tory Peterson, American ornithologist
- Roger Pierre (1923–2010), French actor
- Roger Pilote (1934–2023), Canadian politician
- Roger Pogoy (born 1992), Filipino professional basketball player
- Roger Price (comedy) (1918–1990), American humorist who created Droodles and Mad Libs
- Roger Price (television producer) (born 1941), English television producer
- Roger Price (Australian politician) (born 1945), Labor member of the Australian House of Representatives (1984–2010)
- Roger Pulvers (born 1944), Australian playwright, theatre director and translator
- Roger Pulwarty (born 1960), Trinidadian scientist
- Roger Rees, British actor
- Roger Roberts (swimmer) (born 1948), British former swimmer
- Roger Roger (composer), French composer
- Roger Rogerson, former detective of the NSW Police Force and convicted murderer
- Roger Rose (born 1958), American actor
- Roger Rosengarten (born 2002), American football player
- Roger Rossat-Mignod (born 1946), French alpine skier
- Roger Sablonier (1941–2010), Swiss historian and writer
- Brother Roger (1915–2005), baptised Roger Louis Schutz-Marsauche, Swiss initiator of the Taizé community
- Roger Scruton (1944–2020), English philosopher and writer
- Roger Sessions, American music composer
- Roger Hale Sheaffe, British general, one of the principal commanders of War of 1812
- Roger Sheaffe (politician), member of the Queensland Legislative Assembly
- Roger Sherman, American revolutionary, signer of many famous documents, inventor of congressional system, one of the Founding Fathers of the United States
- Roger Smith (actor), American actor
- Roger Smith (executive) (1925–2007), American chairman and CEO of General Motors and the subject of Michael Moore's documentary film Roger & Me
- Roger Spink (born 1958), Falkland Islands politician
- Roger Dale Stafford (1951–1995), American convicted spree killer and serial killer
- Roger Staubach, American football player
- Roger Stone, American political lobbyist, strategist, and author
- Roger Sumich, New Zealand cyclist
- Roger Tahull (born 1997), Spanish water polo player
- Roger Taylor, British drummer for Queen
- Roger Taylor, British drummer for Duran Duran
- Roger Toussaint, American transit worker's union official
- Roger Troutman (1951–1999), also known as Roger, American R&B recording artist, singer for Zapp
- Roger Tuivasa-Sheck (born 1993), New Zealand rugby player
- Roger Vadim, French film director
- Roger Vandergoten (born 1943), Belgian volleyball player
- Roger Vangheluwe, Belgian bishop, resigned following pedophilia scandal
- Roger Vogel (born 1947), American composer
- Roger Waters, English rock musician and songwriter
- Roger Wedge (1948–2010), Canadian politician
- Roger Whittaker (1936-2023), British singer
- Roger Wicker (born 1951), U.S. Senator from Mississippi
- Roger Willemsen (1955–2016), German author, essayist and TV presenter
- Roger Williams (1603–1683), English minister, theologian, and author, co-founder of Rhode Island
- Roger Williams (pianist) (1924–2011), American pianist
- Roger Williams (soldier) (1539/40–1595), Welsh soldier of fortune and military theorist, one of the principal commanders of Eighty Years' War and Battle of Arques
- Roger L. Worsley, American educator
- Roger Wrightson, English cricketer
- Roger Yap (born 1977), Filipino former professional basketball player
- Roger Arliner Young (1899–1964), American scientist, first African American woman to earn a PhD in Zoology
- Roger Zelazny, American science-fiction author

=== Surname ===
- Bunny Roger (1911–1997), English couturier
- Charles Rogier, Belgian liberal statesman and a leader in the Belgian Revolution, Prime Minister of Belgium 1847–1852 and 1857–1868
- Christophe Roger-Vasselin (born 1957), French former tennis player, father of Édouard
- Denise Roger (1924-2005), French composer
- Édouard Roger-Vasselin (born 1983), French tennis player, son of Christophe
- Julius Roger (1819–1865), German entomologist and medical doctor
- Marie-Sabine Roger (born 1957), French writer
- Mircea Roger (born 1947), Romanian Olympic rower
- Noëlle Roger (1874–1953), Swiss writer in French
- Roger Roger (composer) (1911–1995), French composer

== Fictional characters ==
- Gold Roger (Gol D. Roger), the Pirate King in the manga/anime-series One Piece
- Roger (American Dad!), protagonist of the animated sitcom American Dad!
- Roger the Dodger, from The Beano
- Roger (Guilty Gear)
- Roger (Tekken), a kangaroo character from the Tekken fighting game series, and Roger Jr., his son
- Roger Brook secret agent and Napoleonic Wars Era gallant in a series of novels by Dennis Wheatley
- Roger Chillingworth, the antagonist in Nathaniel Hawthorne's novel The Scarlet Letter
- Roger Davis (Rent), musician and ex-druggie of Rent
- Roger De Bris, director-turned-actor in The Producers and its musical version
- Roger Healey, captain/major played by Bill Daily in the I Dream of Jeannie 1960's sitcom
- Monsieur Roger LeClerc, in the BBC sitcom 'Allo 'Allo!
- Roger Murtaugh, cop played by Danny Glover in the Lethal Weapon movies
- Roger Peralta, Jake's father in Brooklyn 99
- Roger Rabbit, cartoon character from the 1988 film Who Framed Roger Rabbit''
- Roger Ramjet, cartoon superhero
- Roger Smith, the main protagonist of the anime series The Big O
- Roger Sterling, co-owner of the advertising company Sterling Cooper, a character in the television series Mad Men
- Roger Wilco, protagonist of the Space Quest game series

== Animal ==
- Roger (kangaroo), Australian kangaroo with an extraordinary physique, aka "Ripped Roger" (circa 2006 – 2018)

== See also ==
- Roger Dodger (phrase)
- Roger-Vasselin (disambiguation)
- Roger (voice procedure)
- Ruggiero (character)
- Raja (similarly pronounced in some accents)
