= Ruggiero =

Ruggiero may refer to:

- Ruggiero (given name)
- Ruggiero (surname)
- Ruggiero (character), a character found in Ludovico Ariosto's Orlando furioso who also appears in Händel's Alcina among other operas
- Ruggiero (music), a musical scheme which is at times harmonic and at times melodic
- Ruggiero, a 1771 opera by Johann Adolf Hasse after Ariosto

== See also ==
- Ruggero
- La liberazione di Ruggiero, a 1625 comic opera by Francesca Caccini
- Torre di Ruggiero, a comune and town in the province of Catanzaro in the Calabria region of Italy
