= Rougier =

Rougier is a surname of French origin. People with the name include:

- Adrien Rougier (1892-1984), French organist and composer
- Aline Rougier, French scientist
- Arthur Rougier (born 2000), French racing driver
- Clémence Rougier (born 2005), French triple jumper
- Emmanuel Rougier (1864-1932), French missionary and businessman
- Félix de Jesús Rougier (1859-1938), French priest
- Henri Rougier (1876–1956), French racing cyclist, airplane pilot, and sporting motorist; winner of the first Monte Carlo Rally
- Jonathan Rougier (disambiguation), multiple people
- Louis Rougier (1889–1982), French philosopher and historian
- Richard Rougier (1932–2007), judge of the High Court of England and Wales
- Stan Rougier (born 1930), French Catholic priest and writer
- Stéphane Rougier, French classical violinist
- Tony Rougier (born 1971), Trinidadian professional football player and coach

== See also ==
- Rogier
