= Rogério =

Rogério ([ʁuˈʒɛɾiu] or [ʁoˈʒɛɾiu]) is a Portuguese male given name, and a variant of the first name Roger. It may refer to:

- Rogério Fidélis Régis, or simply Rogério (1976), Brazilian footballer
- Rogério Lourenço (1971), Brazilian footballer
- Rogério Luiz da Silva (1980), Brazilian footballer, also commonly known as Rogério
- Rogério dos Santos Conceição (1984), Brazilian footballer
- Rogério de Assis Silva Coutinho or simply Rogerinho (1987), Brazilian footballer
- Rogério Rodrigues da Silva (1984), Brazilian footballer
- Rogério Gonçalves Martins (1984), Brazilian footballer
- Rogério Ceni (1973), Brazilian footballer
- Rogério Dutra da Silva (1984)
- Antônio Rogério Nogueira (1976), Brazilian martial artist
- Rogério Romero (1969), former backstroke swimmer from Brazil
- Rogério Pinheiro dos Santos (1972), Brazilian footballer
- Rogério Gaúcho (1979)
- Rogério Corrêa (1979), Brazilian former footballer and manager
- Rogério Corrêa (1981), Brazilian former footballer and manager
- Rogério Duprat (1932–2006), Brazilian composer and musician
- Rogério Skylab (1956), Brazilian author and musician
- Marcos Rogério Oliveira Duarte (1985), Brazilian footballer
- Rogério Bispo (1985), Brazilian long jumper
- Rogério Gonçalves (1959), Portuguese football manager
- Rogério Ferreira (1973), beach volleyball player from Brazil
- Rogério Sampaio (1967), Brazilian judoka and Olympic champion
- Rogério Lobo (1923–2015), commonly known as "Roger Lobo", a former Hong Kong politician of Macanese descent
- Rogério Oliveira da Silva (1998), Brazilian footballer
- Rogério Teófilo (27 April 1957 — 7 August 2020), Brazilian politician
- Rogério Fernandes (born 2002), Portuguese football right-back
- Rogério Bacalhau, Portuguese politician
