= List of programs broadcast by Polynésie 1ère =

This is a list of television programs broadcast by Polynésie 1ère in French Polynesia.

== Programs ==
- 20h30 en fêtes (8:30pm in Holidays)
- 20h30 le dimanche (Sunday 8:30pm)
- 300 choeurs pour les fêtes (300 Choirs for Holidays)
- 68
- A ha amana o na : souviens-toi... (A Ha Amana O Na: Remember...)
- A l'école de la savane (At the School of the Savannah)
- A quatre mains (Four Hands)
- Active ta vie ! Mangez, bougez, vivez (Activate Your Life! Eat, Move, Live)
- Addiction : vivre sans (Addiction: Live Without)
- ADN, la quête des origines (DNA, The Quest for Origins)
- Afghanistan, l'héritage des French Doctors (Afghanistan, the Legacy of the French Doctors)
- Agitateurs de goût (Taste Stirrers)
- Ahitea
- Aiu Himene Taua (Important Songs)
- Amanda
- Animaux extraordinaires (Extroardinary Animals)
- Arabie sauvage (Wild Arabia)
- Ariane et Barbe-Bleue (Ariane and Bluebeard)
- Au coeur des rythmes d'un Noël antillais (In the Heart of the Rhythms of a Caribbean Christmas)
- Aux armes Tahitiens (Tahitian Weapons)
- Artistes de France (Artists from France)
- Barbara, elle et nous (Barbara, She and Us)
- Behind fashion
- Bleu océan (Ocean Blue)
- Blue Boat
- Blue Water High: Surf Academy
- Bons baisers de Moscou (Good Kisses from Moscow)
- Boyard Land
- Brokenwood
- Ça commence aujourd'hui (It All Starts Today)
- Ça ne sortira pas d'ici (It Will Not Come Out of Here)
- Cash investigation (Cash Investigation)
- Catalina * 2016
- Cérémonie du 11 novembre (Ceremony of November 11)
- C'est pas sorcier (This is Not Rocket Science)
- Clips
- Champions de France (sports, Champions of France)
- Chorales de Noël (Christmas Corales)
- Chris aux Vieilles Charrues (Chris at the Vieilles Charrues)
- Chroniques d'en haut (Chronicles from Above)
- Couleurs outremers (Overseas Colors)
- Cuba, l'histoire secrète (Cuba, the Secret History)
- Crossing Lines
- Cuba, l'île sanctuaire (Cuba, the Sanctuary Island)
- Dance in Paradise
- Dans les yeux d'Olivier (In Oliver's Eyes)
- Débat (Debate)
- Des bateaux et des hommes (Boats and Men)
- Des trains pas comme les autres (Trains Like No Other)
- Des volcans et des îles (Volcanoes and Islands)
- Destination Russia
- Dieu m'est témoin (God is My Witness)
- Drôlement bêtes : les animaux en questions (Funny Beasts: Animals in Question)
- D'une île à l'autre (From One Island to Another)
- Du soleil dans nos assiettes (Sun On Our Plates)
- Echappées belles (Close Call)
- Edition spéciale (Special Edition)
- Elles aussi (They Too)
- Explorations de l'extrême (Explorations of the Extreme)
- Fare ma'ohi
- Farereira'a time
- Farewell, l'espion qui aimait la France (Farewell, the Spy Who Loved France)
- FBI: Duo très spécial (FBI: Very Special Duo)
- Festival des marquises 2019 (Marquises Festival 2019)
- Football (Soccer)
- Fos-sur-Mer, les révoltes de la pollution (Fos-sur-Mer, the Pollution Revolts)
- Glee
- Global Wheeling
- Gosses de France
- Guadeloupe, des cimes à l'océan (Guadeloupe, from the Peaks to the Ocean)
- Ha'uti mai
- Hine tai a, chroniques d'une famille de pêcheurs (Hine Tai A, Chronicles of a Fisherman's Family)
- Holopuni va'a Hawaiki Nui voyage 2019 (Holopuni Va'a Hawaiki Nui Trip 2019)
- Horizon Pacifique (Pacific Horizon)
- How I Met Your Mother
- Ile de Pâques, les Rapanui en résistance (Easter Island, the Rapanui in Resistance)
- Impardonnable (Unforgivable)
- Influences, une histoire de l'art au présent (Influences, A History of Art in the Present)
- Investigatiôns (Investigations)
- Islander's Tahiti
- Jaguars en danger (Jaguars in Danger)
- Je suis d'ici
- Journal 20h00 (Newspaper 8:00pm)
- Journal Polynésie (French Polynesia Newspaper)
- JT Polynesia
- Ker Domino
- Kid reporters
- Kings Casino
- K-Ville
- Heheu
- Hospital IT
- L'abécédaire de Noël 2019 (The 2019 Christmas Alphabet)
- La bataille du miel (The Battle of Honey)
- La famille Pirate (a cartoon, The Pirate Family)
- La fête de la grenouille (The Frog Party)
- La jeune fille et le ballon ovale (The Girl and the Oval Ball)
- Le lagon de Mayotte : une autre idée du voyage (The Lagoon of Mayotte: Another Idea of the Trip)
- La maison France 5 (The France 5 House)
- La nuit des chorales du Pacifique (Pacific Choir Night)
- La nuit des talents 2019 (The Night of Talents 2019)
- La vie secrète des orques (The Secret Life of Orcs)
- La virilité (Manlines)
- La ora
- La promesse (The Promise)
- La virilité (Manlines)
- L'affaire Markovic : coup bas chez les gaullistes (The Markovic Case: A Group with the Gaullists)
- L'amour en gage (Love as a Pledge)
- Le chalet (The Chalet)
- Le Dino train (a cartoon, The Dino Train)
- Le grand show de l'humour (The Big Show of Humor)
- Le IIIe Reich n'aura pas la bombe (The Third Reich Will Not Have a Bomb)
- Le monde selon Amazon (The World According to Amazon)
- Le piment ne manque pas de piquant (The Pepper Does Not Miss Spicy)
- Le plaidoyer d'Anote : les Kiribati, au bord de la noyade (Anoti's Plea: Kiribati, On the Verge of Drowning)
- Le poids de la joie (The Weight of Joy)
- Le prix de la passion (The Price of Passion)
- Le refuge des orphelins sauvages (The Refuge of Wild Orphans)
- Le Vaisseau fantôme (The Ghost Ship)
- Léa Parker
- L'enfant de tous les possibles (The Child of All Possibilities)
- L'envers du paradis (The Reverse of Paradise)
- Les amants magnifiques (Beautiful Lovers)
- Les contes de Masha (a cartoon, Masha's Tales)
- Les derniers jours de Franco (The Last Days of Franco)
- Les écrivains, le silence et les chats (Writers, Silence and Cats)
- Les forêts oubliées de Malaisie (The Forgotten Forests of Malaysia)
- Les fous du funk (Fools of Funk)
- Les frères rivaux
- Les Griffin (The Griffin)
- Les hommes de Billancourt (The Men of Billancourt)
- Les liens de sang (Blood Ties)
- Les ombres du passé (The Shadows of the Past)
- Les plantes vertes comestibles du Pacifique (Green Edible Plants of the Pacific)
- Les plus beaux ponts du monde (The Most Beautiful Bridges in the World)
- Les routes de l'impossible (The Roads of the Impossible)
- Les témoins d'outre-mer (Overseas Witnesses)
- Les trésors cachés des variétés (Hidden Treasures of Varieties)
- Les trésors des arts de la table (The Treasure of the Arts of the Table)
- Les triplés (a cartoon, The Triplets)
- Les trois visages d'Ana (The Three Faces of Ana)
- Lie to Me
- L'Indonésie sauvage (Wild Indonesia)
- LoliRock (a cartoon)
- Malama tagata Wallis
- Ma'ohi nui, terre de marchandises (Ma'ohi Nui, Land of Merchandise)
- Mara, une femme unique (Mara, a Unique Woman)
- Martin Matin (a cartoon, Martin Morning)
- Masha et Michka (a cartoon, Masha and Michka)
- Mata'Ara(also known as Mata ara)
- Ma vie à côté de la centrale (My Life Next to the Power Plant)
- Mega la blague (Mega the Joke)
- Mémoires de rue (Street Memories)
- Mentalist
- Météo (Weather, in Tahitian)
- Messe de Noël (Christmas Mass)
- MI-5
- Miss Tahiti 2018
- Miss Univers 2019 (Miss Universe 2019)
- Modern Family
- Modules CPME (CPME Modules)
- Mofy (a cartoon)
- Molusco (a cartoon)
- Motus
- Nous, gens de la terre (We, People of Earth)
- Nouvelle-Calédonie, l'archipel aux sabots rois (New Caledonia, Archipelago with Hooves Kings)
- Nouvelle-Calédonie, les pépites du lagon (New Caledonia, the Nuggets of the Lagoon)
- Ono'u 2017
- Ono'u 2018
- Ori Tahiti Nui Compétitions 2018 (Ori Tahiti Nui Competitions 2018)
- Outremer tout court (Overseas Anyway)
- Parents mode d'emploi (Parents' Instructions)
- Pari pari fenua
- Paris, années folles (Paris, Roaring Twenties)
- Patitifa
- Patutiki, l'art du tatouage des îles Marquises (Patutiki, the Tattoo Art of the Marquesas Islands)
- Peherau
- Personne n'y avait pensé ! (Nobody Thought of It!)
- Peut-on rire de tout ? (Can We Laugh at Everything?)
- Pierre Desproges, une plume dans le culte (Pierre Desproges, a Feather in the Cult)
- Place aux jeunes (Young People)
- Plus belle la vie (More Beautiful Life)
- Police District (District Police)
- Police scientifique, le crime à la loupe (Police, Crime with a Magnifying Glass)
- Polynés'îles
- Precious Pearl
- Prison Break
- Radio Vison
- Rosewood
- Regards
- Rizzoli & Isles
- Rugby
- Sah Ke Bon Camera
- Sale temps pour la planète (Dirty Weather for the Planet)
- Samba et Leuk le lièvre (Samba and Leuk the Hare)
- Samedi d'en rire (Saturday to Laugh)
- Sans tabu
- Scandola
- Scolopendres et papillons (Scolopendres and Butterflies)
- Shots Fired
- Slam
- Sports nautiques (Nautical Sports)
- Spot prévention routière (Road Safety Spot)
- Sur écoute (Bugged)
- Surpoids à La Réunion : des maux et des combats (Overweight in Reunion: Ills and Fighting)
- Sydney Fox, l'aventurière (Sydney Fox, the Adventurer)
- Tama himene
- Tamerlano
- Taratata
- Te hono tu'aro
- Te Pina I nui
- Te ve a porotetani
- The Americans
- The Fall
- The Good Karma Hospital
- The Queen of Flow
- This Is Us
- Tikehau, les enfants du lagon (Tikehau, Children of the Lagoon)
- Toi, mon amour (You, My Love)
- Total Praise
- Toulouse-Lautrec, vivre et peindre à en mourir (Toulouse-Lautrec, Live and Paint to Death)
- Tout le monde veut prendre sa place (Everyone Wants to Take His Place)
- Toutankhamon, les secrets du pharaon (Tutankhaman, the Secrets of Pharaoh)
- Tropical gourmett
- Tu'aro Sport, le mag
- Ultramarins, ultraterriens
- Underground
- Un si grand soleil (Such a Big Sun)
- Vaipehe 2019
- Vanuatu : Troc, coutumes et dents de cochon (Vanuatu: Barter, Customs, and Pig Teeth)
- Variations
- Ve'a Tahiti (in Tahitian)
- Vertige aux Marquises (Vertigo in the Marquises)
- Vevo le grand rendez-vous (Vevo the Grand Date)
- Victoria
- Vues d'en haut (Views from Above)
- Wallis-et-Futuna : un héritage culturel commun (Wallis and Futuna: A Common Cultural Heritage)
- Waterman Tahiti Tour 2019
- Wildflower
- Wonderful Town
- XV/15 (rugby)
- Zik Truck
- Zou (a cartoon)
