= Ruggerio =

Ruggerio is a surname. Notable people with the surname include:

- David Ruggerio (born 1962), American chef, author and television personality
- Dominick J. Ruggerio (1948–2025), American politician

== See also ==
- Ruggero
- Ruggiero
