= Rutger =

- Pronunciation: Dutch: [ˈrʏtxər]
- Gender: male
- Language: Dutch

Origin
- Origin: Proto-Germanic: *χrōþi- "glory" + *gaiza- "spear"
- Region of origin: Netherlands, Flanders

Other names
- Alternative spelling: Rutgher (archaic), Rudger

Rutger is a male given name common in the Netherlands, and a cognate of the first name Roger.

== People ==
- Ruotger (died 931), archbishop of Trier
- Rutger I of Cleves (c. 975 – 1050), First Duke of Cleves
- Rutger II of Cleves (died 1075), Second Duke of Cleves
- Rutger von Ascheberg (1621–1693), Swedish cavalry officer and civil servant, one of the principal commanders of Scanian War
- Rutger Backe (born 1951), Swedish footballer
- Rutger Beke (born 1977), Belgian triathlete
- Rutger Bregman (born 1988), Dutch historian
- Rutger Castricum (born 1979), Dutch journalist and presenter
- Rutger Fuchs (1682–1753), Swedish military leader
- Rutger Gunnarsson (1946–2015), Swedish musician and guitarist
- Rutger Hauer (1944–2019), Dutch actor
- Rutger Kopland (1934–2012), Dutch poet and psychiatrist
- Rutger Koppelaar (born 1993), Dutch pole vaulter
- Rutger van Langevelt (1635–1695), Dutch mathematician, painter and architect
- Rutger Macklean (1742–1816), Swedish land reformer
- Rutger Macklier (1688–1748), Swedish army officer
- Rutger McGroarty (born 2004), American ice hockey player
- Rutger B. Miller (1805–1877), member of the United States House of Representatives
- Rutger de Regt (born 1979), Dutch designer
- Rutger van Schaardenburg (born 1987), Dutch sailor
- Rutger Jan Schimmelpenninck (1761–1825), Dutch politician, Grand Pensionary of the Batavian Republic
- Rutger Sernander (1866–1944), Swedish botanist, geologist and archaeologist
- Rutger Smith (born 1981), Dutch shot put and discus throw athlete
- Rutger Stuffken (1947–2023), Dutch coxswain
- Rutger Velpius (c. 1540 – 1614/1615), Flemish printer and bookseller
- Rütger Wever (1923–2010), German chronobiologist
- Rutger Worm (born 1986), Dutch footballer
- Rutger Szymanski (born 1995), Dutch linguist

== Other ==
- 5886 Rutger, a Main-belt Asteroid
- The Rutger-Steuben Park Historic District in New York, USA

== See also ==
- Rogier (disambiguation)
- Rüdiger
- Rutgers (disambiguation)
- Rutgers (surname)
- Rutgers University, The State University of New Jersey, USA
