= Roger Dodger =

Roger Dodger may refer to:

- Roger the Dodger, a comic strip featured frequently in the British comic The Beano
- Roger Dodger (phrase)
- Roger the Dodger, a nickname for former Dallas Cowboys quarterback Roger Staubach
- Roger Dodger (film), a 2002 comedy film starring Campbell Scott
- Rodger Dodger (The Penguins of Madagascar episode), an episode of The Penguins of Madagascar
