= Roar (given name) =

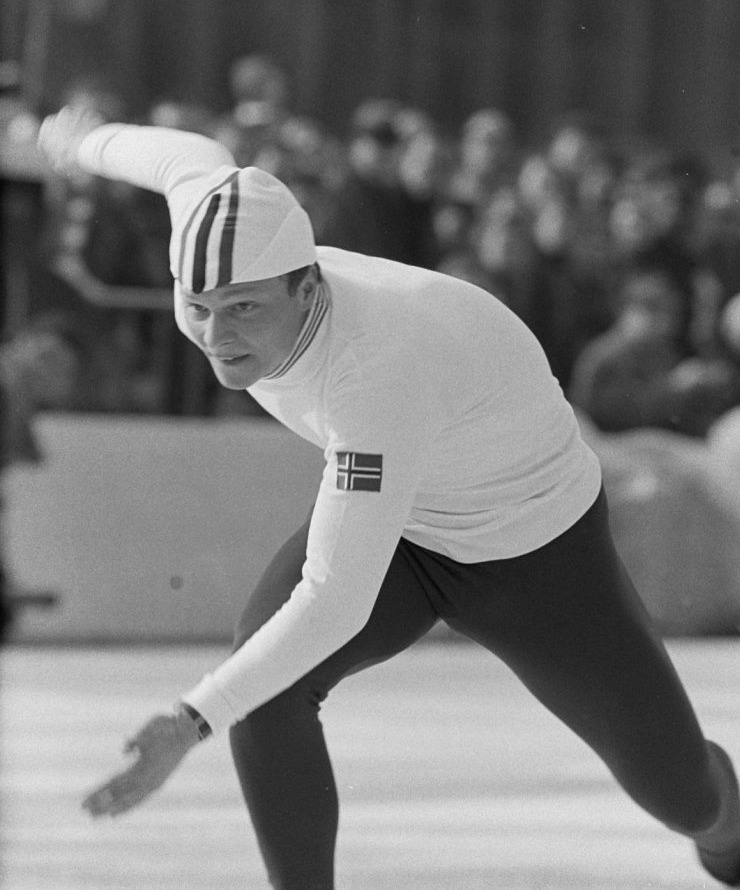
Roar Grønvold

Roar is a Norwegian masculine given name derived by the Old Norse name Hróðgeirr, and equivalent of the Norman-French name Roger. Notable people with the name include:

- Roar Adler (1915–2007), Norwegian newspaper manager
- Roar Berthelsen (1934–1990), Norwegian long jumper
- Roar Christensen (born 1971), Norwegian football midfielder
- Roar Flåthen (born 1950), Norwegian trade unionist and politician
- Roar Grønvold (born 1946), Norwegian speed skater and Olympic medalist
- Roar Hagen (born 1954), Norwegian illustrator
- Roar Hagen (footballer) (born 1971), Norwegian football goalkeeper
- Roar Hauglid (1910–2001), Norwegian art historian and publicist
- Roar Hoff (born 1965), Norwegian shot putter
- Roar Johansen (footballer) (born 1935), Norwegian footballer
- Roar Johansen (football coach) (born 1968), Norwegian football coach
- Roar Kjernstad (born 1975), Norwegian figurative painter
- Roar Ljøkelsøy (born 1976), Norwegian ski jumper
- Roar Øfstedal, Norwegian ice hockey player
- Roar Pedersen (1927–1989), Norwegian ice hockey player
- Roar Stokke (born 1959), Norwegian football player, coach and sports commentator
- Roar Strand (born 1970), Norwegian football player
- Roar Uthaug (born 1973), Norwegian film director
