= Van Aerde =

Van Aerde is a Dutch surname. Notable people with the surname include:

- Michel Van Aerde (1933–2020), Belgian bike racer
- Rogier van Aerde (1917–2007), pseudonym of Adolf Josef Hubert Frans van Rijen
