= Cyril Féraud =

French radio and television presenter

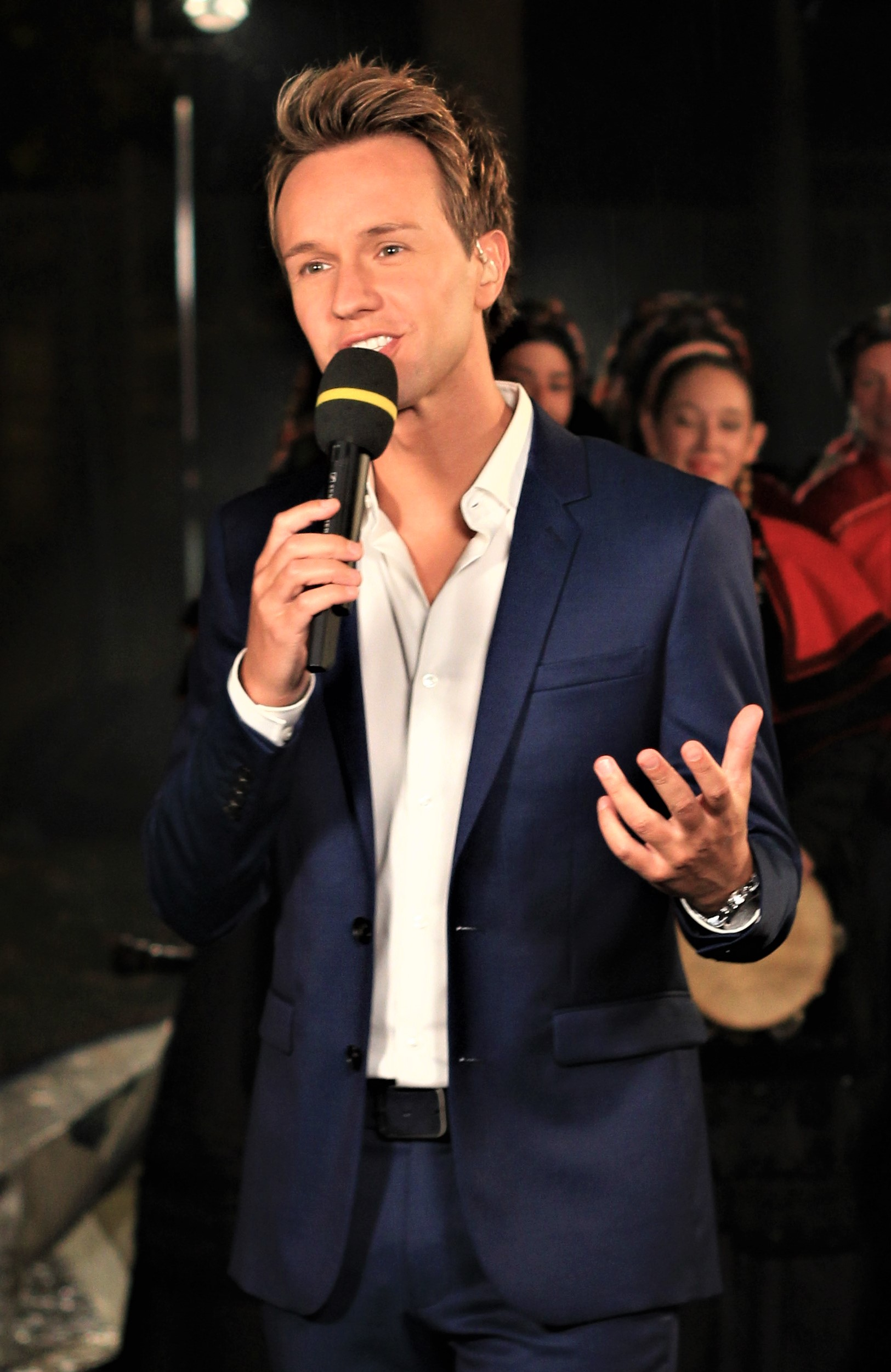
- Féraud at the Festival Interceltique de Lorient in 2018
- Born: 15 March 1985 (age 41); Digne-les-Bains, France
- Occupation: Television presenter
- Years active: 2004–present
- Employer: France Télévisions (2008–present)

Cyril Féraud (born 15 March 1985 in Digne-les-Bains) is a French radio and television host and audiovisual producer. Féraud has been working primarily for the public broadcaster France Télévisions since 2008, where he is currently the host of the game shows 100% Logique, The Floor, à la conquête du sol, Tout le monde veut prendre sa place and Fort Boyard on France 2, and a number of live annual events.

Féraud was a co-commentator for France 3's coverage of the Eurovision Song Contest final from 2012 to 2014, having previously acted as the French vote spokesperson for the 2011 contest. He is the founder and manager of the audiovisual production company CyrilProd.

== Biography ==
Cyril Féraud was born on 15 March 1985 in Digne-les-Bains (Alpes-de-Haute-Provence). He is an only child and was passionate about television game shows from a young age. In the early 2000s, from the age of 16, he sent game ideas to the production team of the show Fort Boyard. After a master's degree in communication and management, he took his first steps in the industry as an assistant for this same programme "which made (him) want to do television". Although Féraud generally doesn't discuss his private life, he did reveal in July 2024 the arrival of his first child, a baby boy, named Tim.

== Media career ==
From 2005 to 2015, Féraud worked as a journalist for the weekly Télé Poche, as a reporter, head of the entertainment section, then as head of information.

In 2006, he made his radio debut as a columnist on Jean-Marc Morandini's Le Grand Direct program on Europe 1, with whom he worked for four seasons on the radio and television on the Morandini! program on Direct 8.

From 29 August 2016 to 30 June 2017, he hosts Midi avec vous on MFM Radio, each weekday from noon to 1 p.m.

== Television career ==
Féraud began his career as a television host in 2004 at the helm of children's programs Art Attack and the programming block Zapping Zone on Disney Channel. He provided French commentary for the Nickelodeon Kids' Choice Awards in 2008 and 2009, respectively with singers M. Pokora and Sliimy, on the local variant of Nickelodeon. Spotted by the national lottery operator Française des Jeux, he presented the new Loto draw live on France 2 in October 2008. He continued as a host of the draw for three years.

Since 26 October 2009, he has hosted the game show Slam, which combines quizzes and crossword puzzles, every weekday afternoon on France 3. During his first two years as host, the show tripled the audience of the time slot with 1.4 million viewers on average, quickly making Féraud one of the channel's flagship hosts. Since 1 March 2015, he has been in charge of Le Grand Slam, the weekly version of Slam in which the best candidates in the game compete each Sunday. On 27 April 2024, Féraud announced that he would be leaving both programmes later that year and would succeed comedian Jarry as host of Tout le monde veut prendre sa place on France 2. In June, it was announced that Théo Curin would take over as host.

From 2010 onwards, France 3 entrusts him with the presentation of various prime time programs: Le Tournoi d'orthographe and Le Grand Bêtisier in 2010, Le Grand Jeu in 2011 and 300 chœurs pour + de vie in 2012. After being the voting spokesperson for France at the contest in 2011, he was co-commentator for the Eurovision Song Contest grand final for three years: on 26 May 2012, with Mireille Dumas from Baku, Azerbaijan, on 18 May 2013, again with Dumas, live from Malmö, Sweden and on 10 May 2014, this time with Natasha St-Pier, in Copenhagen, Denmark. In March 2022, he was a member of the jury to help select France's entry for the Eurovision Song Contest 2022.

In 2011, 2015–2016 and again from 2018 to 2021, he presented the quiz show Personne n’y avait pensé! (an adaptation of BBC's Pointless) on France 3, a game of general knowledge in which the candidates must score as less points as possible to win. In January 2018, the game moved to a daily broadcast just before Slam and replaced another game show Harry.

Since April 2018, after campaigning for its return, he has presented the new version of the adventure game show La Carte aux Trésors in prime time on France 3, the show having been absent from the air for nine years.

Since 2021, he has been presenting two major prime time events on France 2: Le Quiz des Champions (an adaptation of British ITV show Quiz Master), which sees the greatest TV game champions in France compete against each other, and 100% Logique (an adaptation of another ITV show The 1% Club), in which 100 candidates compete to test their logic and their sense of observation.

In March 2022, he presented Quelle sera la meilleure danse folklorique de France? (What will be the best folk dance in France?), a major competition in which the French regions come to demonstrate their traditional dances in prime time on France 3. Since August 2022, he has presented every day Duels en Familles on France 3, a French game show created by himself, in which two families compete in general knowledge duels. The game show airs daily, just before Slam.

In 2026, Féraud took over as host of Fort Boyard.

=== Special events ===
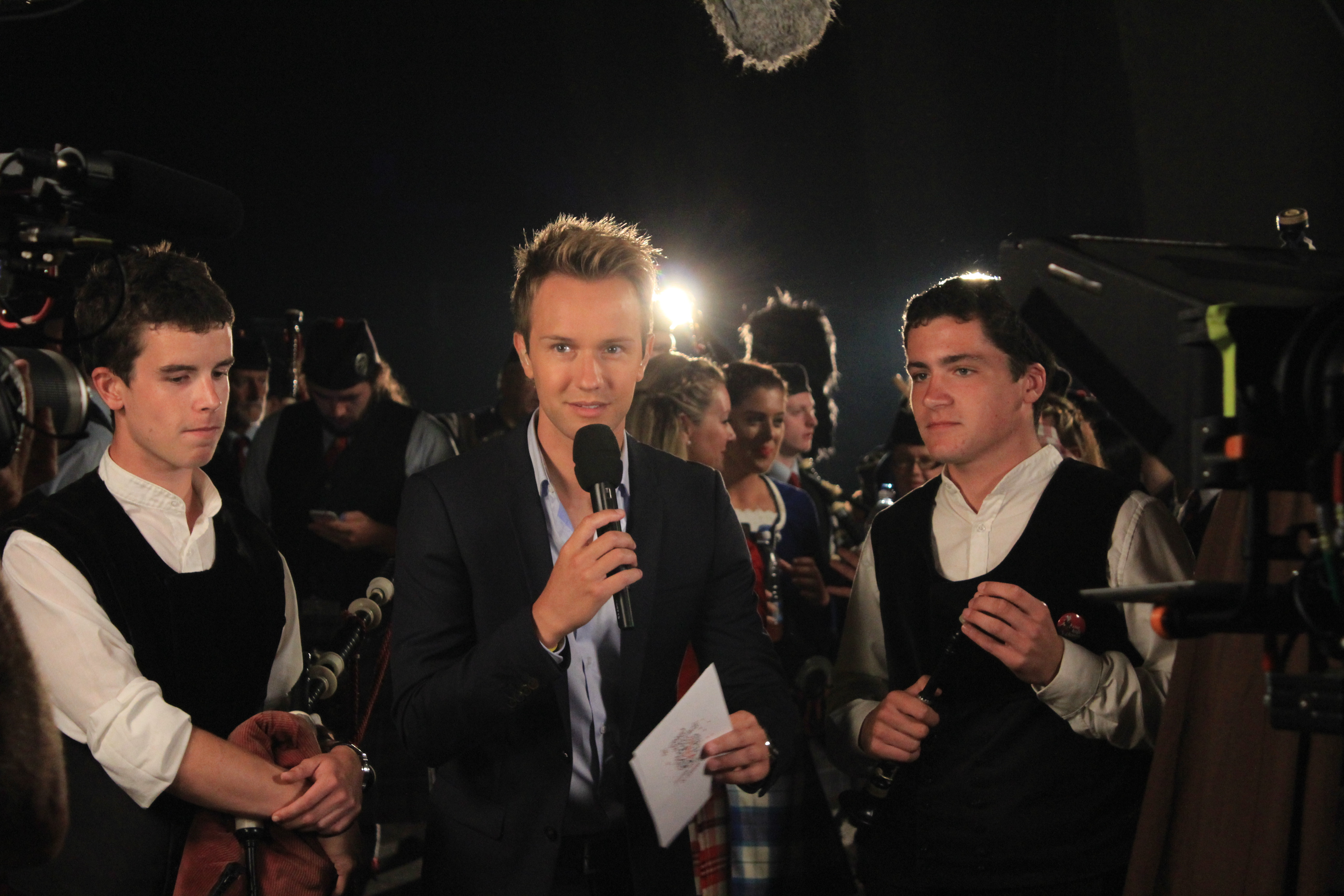
Féraud with musicians at the Festival Interceltique de Lorient in 2015

In March 2009, he presented the Sidaction evening live on France 2 alongside Line Renaud which featured seventy artists singing together in the streets of Paris. Then in March 2010, the Les Stars du Rire Spéciale Sidaction evening alongside Patrick Sabatier live on France 2.

A recurring host of the Téléthon since 2010, he has presented the launch party in prime time and live on France 3 with Sophie Davant since 2012.

From 2013, he has played host at most of France 3's live performance programs in prime time: International Circus Festival of Monte-Carlo every year since 2013, Le Grand Spectacle du Festival Interceltique de Lorient every summer since 2015, Musiques en Fête live from the Chorégies d'Orange every year since 2017, La Folie Offenbach in January 2018, La Grande Parade des Nations Celtes since 2018.

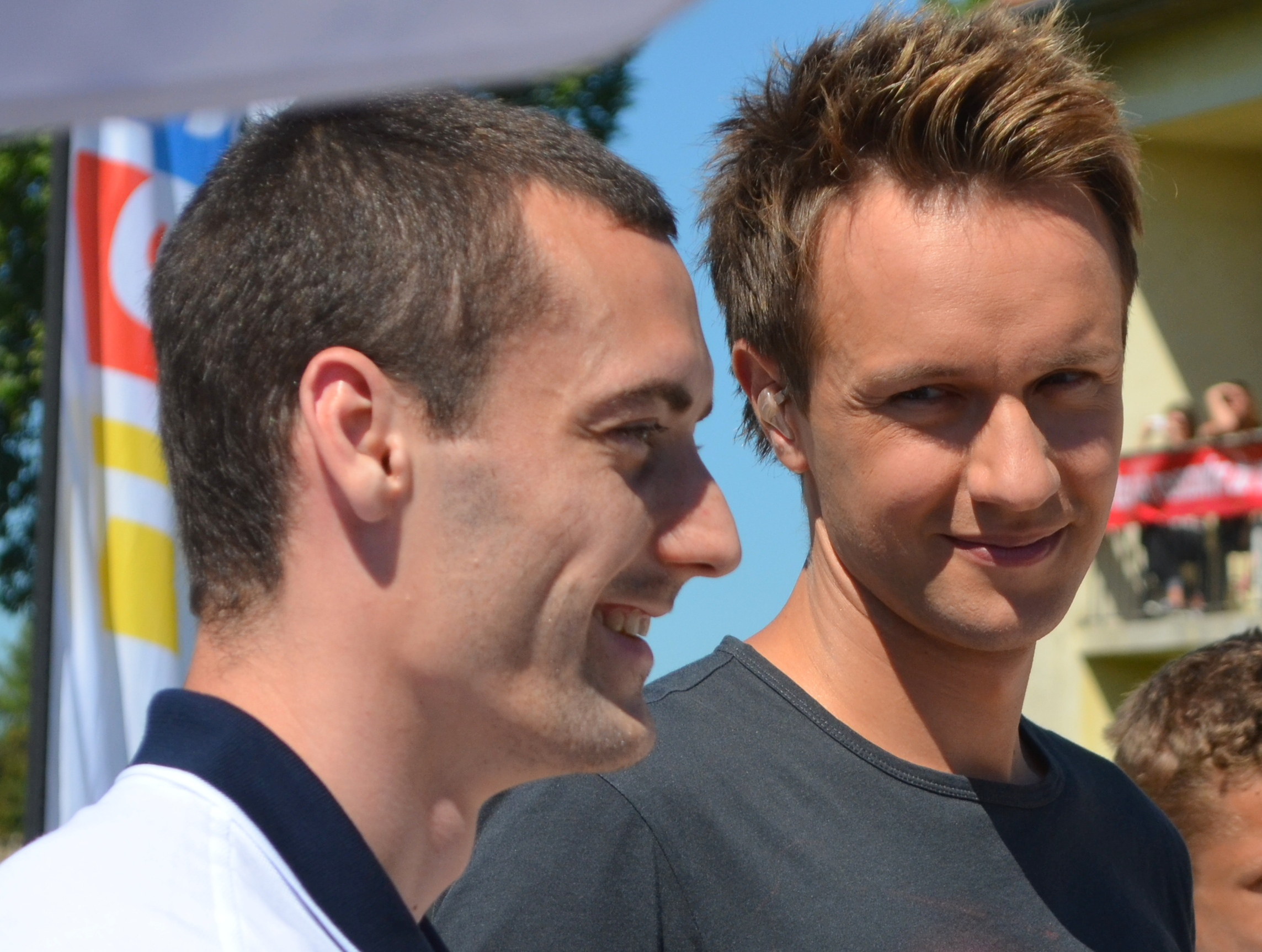
Féraud and artistic gymnast Cyril Tommasone during Village Départ in July 2016

In 2015 and 2016, during the whole Tour de France, he co-presented the France 3 program Village Départ with Laurent Luyat, and presented a sporting event every day, in which a local resident tries to beat a record, as well as a sequence on the heritage of the city visited.

In 2016 and 2017, he presented the sixty concerts of Âge Tendre, the Idol Tour, now produced by Christophe Dechavanne and which celebrated its tenth anniversary in the Le Zénith venues of France with a dozen artists such as Sheila, Hugues Aufray, Gérard Lenorman, Les Rubettes. The recording of the show was broadcast on C8 on 22 February 2017 in prime time. In 2018, he presents the second season of the Age Tendre tour, with sixty-two performances in France, Belgium and Switzerland given by a dozen artists including Sheila, Dave, Dick Rivers, Michèle Torr, Nicoletta and was broadcast by C8 on 6 June 2018 again in prime time.

=== Participation in shows ===
After being a production assistant on the France 2 game show Fort Boyard in 2003 and 2004, he participated as a celebrity candidate for the first time on 23 July 2011. He participated again in 2012, 2013, 2016 and 2017. Since 2020, he has joined the show's team by playing the character of Cyril Gossbo (slang term for handsome guy, or beau gosse in French), presenter of the game "Slaïme", a parody inspired by slime material and his own show, Slam.

In 2014, he took part in Toute la télé chante for the Sidaction on France 2. On February 20, 2015, he finished second in the celebrity quiz show Grand Concours des Animateurs (an adaptation of Britain's Brainiest Kid) behind Julien Arnaud, on TF1. On April 16, 2015, he won the French version of The Weakest Link on D8 for the association AIDES, sponsored by Roselyne Bachelot.

Since 2016, he has occasionally participated in the program Vendredi, tout est permis with Arthur on TF1. On February 6, 2021, he participated as a guest in La Boîte à secrets presented by Faustine Bollaert on France 3.

== Charity work ==
In 2012, Féraud was the godfather of the association Grandir which supports families whose children suffer from growth problems. Since 2020, he has been the godfather of the association Les lutins du Phoenix, whose volunteer members dress up as superheroes to visit children hospitalized in the pediatric oncology department.

== Filmography ==
=== Television ===
Year	Title	Channel	Role	Note(s)
2004	Art Attack	Disney Channel	Presenter	
2004–2005	Zapping Zone	Disney Channel	Presenter	
2008–2009	Nickelodeon Kids' Choice Awards	Nickelodeon	Commentator	With M. Pokora (2008) and Sliimy (2009)
2008–2011	Loto	France 2	Presenter	
2009	Morandini!	Direct 8	Panellist	
2009	Sidaction	France 2	Presenter	
2009–2024	Slam	France 3	Presenter	Daily
2010	Les Stars du Rire spéciale Sidaction	France 2	Presenter	Primetime
2010–2011	Le Tournoi d'orthographe	France 3	Presenter	Primetime
2010–2011	Le Grand Bêtisier	France 3	Presenter	Primetime
2011	Le Grand Jeu	France 3	Presenter	Primetime
2011, 2015–2016, 2018–2021	Personne n'y avait pensé!	France 3	Presenter	Weekly (2011), Bi-weekly (2015–2016), Daily (2018–2021)
2011	Eurovision Song Contest 2011	France 3	French spokesperson	
2012–2014	Eurovision Song Contest	France 3	French commentator	Final only; With Mireille Dumas (2012–2013) and Natasha St-Pier (2014)
2012–2014	300 choeurs pour + de Vie	France 3	Presenter	Primetime
2013–2024	International Circus Festival of Monte-Carlo	France 3	Presenter	
2014	Le Grand Bêtisier de Noël	France 3	Presenter	Primetime
2015–2016	Village Départ	France 3	Presenter	
2009–2010, 2012–2013, 2017–present	Téléthon	France 2, France 3	Presenter	
2015–present	Le Grand Spectacle du Festival interceltique de Lorient	France 3	Presenter	Primetime
2015–2024	Le Grand Slam	France 3	Presenter	Weekly; Spin-off show
2017–2018	Âge tendre, la tournée des idoles	C8	Presenter	Primetime
2017–present	Musiques en Fête	France 3	Presenter	Primetime
2018	La Folie Offenbach	France 3	Presenter	Primetime
2018–2025	La Carte aux trésors	France 3	Presenter	Primetime
2018	La Grande Parade des Nations Celtes	France 3	Presenter	
2020, 2024–present	Victoires de la musiques	France 2	Presenter	With Léa Salamé (2024–2025); Helena Noguerra (2026)
2020–2025	Fort Boyard	France 2	Cyril Gossbo	Slaïme and Bingo'ssbo
2020–2025	Le Grand Concours des Régions	France 3	Presenter	
2021	Spectaculaire	France 2	Co-presenter	With Jean-Marc Généreux
2021–2025	Le Quiz des Champions	France 2	Presenter	Primetime
2022	Eurovision France, c'est vous qui décidez!	France 2	Judge	Primetime
2022–2026	Duels en familles, le match des regions	France 3	Presenter	Daytime
2022–present	100% Logique : la réponse est sous vos yeux	France 2	Presenter	Primetime
2023–present	The Floor, à la conquête du sol	France 2	Presenter	Primetime
2024–present	Tout le monde veut prendre sa place	France 2	Presenter	Daily
2026	Fort Boyard	France 2	Host	Primetime
