= Christiane Singer =

Austrian writer, essayist and novelist

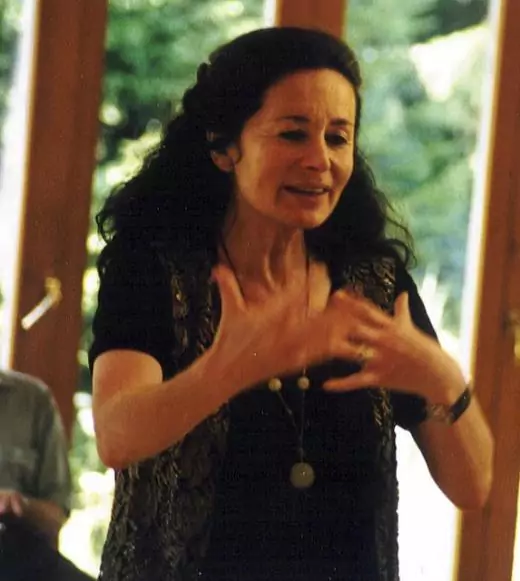
Image of Christiane Singer

Christiane Singer, married name Christiane Thurn-Valsassina (23 March 1943, in Marseille – 4 April 2007, in Vienna) was an Austrian writer, essayist and novelist.

== Biography ==
Her father was of Hungarian origin and her mother was half Russian and half Czech. Because of the persecution of the Jews, her parents fled Hungary, then Austria, and settled in Paris, France, in 1935. She was born eight years later, in 1943, in Marseille.

She attended high school and the Conservatory of Theatre and Dramatic Arts in Marseille and then went on to study literature at the University of Aix-en-Provence, where she obtained a Doctorate of Modern Literature.

In 1968, she met Count Georg von Thurn-Valsassina, an architect, who would become her husband, and settled in 1973 in his medieval castle of Rastenberg (Austria), not far from Vienna. There she raised their two sons. This castle inspired the poetical essay of the same name in 1996, "Rastenberg". She also organized personal development seminars in her home, which she designed, and which her architect husband built.

She followed the teachings of Karlfried Graf Dürckheim (a disciple of C.G. Jung). In Switzerland, she was a lecturer at the University of Basel, then a lecturer at the University of Friburg.

Her work and her personal reflection were entirely centered on the necessary taking into account of the spiritual which lives in everyone's heart. She was a relatively prolific writer, of Christian sensitivity imbued with Oriental wisdom, who refrained from giving lessons in morals and excluded all dogmatism. She won several literary prizes, including the Prix des libraires for La Mort viennoise in 1979, le Prix Albert Camus for Histoire d'âme in 1989, and le prix de la langue française en 2006 for the whole of her work.

She once said in a radio-interview:

I wrote a book on Les Âges de la vie. I tried to show these metamorphoses of being in the course of life. It is obvious that all this is only valid if one has learned to die in the course of existence. And these occasions are given to us so often: All crises, separations, and diseases, and all forms, everything, invites us to learn and leave the unnecessary behind. Death will take away only what we wanted to possess. Death has no hold on the rest. And it is in this progressive deprivation that an immense freedom is created, and an enlarged space, exactly what was not anticipated. I have an immense confidence in aging, because I owe to this acceptance of age an opening that is unsuspected when one has not the audacity to return.

In September 2006, when doctors announced that she had six months left to live as a result of cancer, she wrote a diary in her last months, which was published under the title Derniers fragments d'un long voyage.

== Distinctions ==
- 1979: Prix des libraires for La Mort viennoise.
- 1982: Prix Alice-Louis Barthou de l'Académie française for La Guerre des filles.
- 1989: Prix Albert Camus for Histoire d'âme.
- 1993: Prix Écritures & Spiritualités for Une passion. Entre ciel et terre.
- 2000: Prix Anna de Noailles of the Académie française for Éloge du mariage, de l'engagement et autres folies.
- 2006: Prix de la langue française for her body of work.
- 2007: Prix ALEF for Seul ce qui brûle.

== Documentary ==
In 2011, the documentary film Passion - Hommage à Christiane Singer, by Austrian filmmaker Carola Mair, was released.

== Work ==
=== Novels ===
- 1965: Les Cahiers d'une hypocrite, Albin Michel
- 1965: Vie et mort du beau Frou, Albin Michel
- 1976: Chronique tendre des jours amers, Albin Michel
- 1978: La Mort viennoise, Albin Michel, prix des libraires 1979
- 1981: La Guerre des filles, Albin Michel, prix Alice-Louis Barthou of the Académie française. 1982
- 1981: Histoire d'âme, Albin Michel, reissued 2001 prix Albert Camus 1989
- 1996: Rastenberg, Albin Michel
- 2002: Les Sept Nuits de la reine, Albin Michel
- 2006: Seul ce qui brûle, Albin Michel, Prix ALEF 2007.

=== Essays ===
- 1983: Les Âges de la vie, Albin Michel
- 1992: Une passion. Entre ciel et chair, Albin Michel, Prix Écritures & Spiritualités 1993.
- 1996: Du bon usage des crises, Albin Michel
- 2000: Éloge du mariage, de l'engagement et autres folies, Albin Michel (prix Anna de Noailles de l'Académie française.
- 2001: Où cours-tu, Ne sais-tu pas que le ciel est en toi ?, Albin Michel
- 2005: N'oublie pas les chevaux écumants du passé, Albin Michel
- 2007: Derniers fragments d'un long voyage, Albin Michel, ISBN 2226179550 essay / narrative / diary

Collective

- 2000: La Quête du sens, collectif, Albin Michel, reissued 2004 with Khaled cheikh Bentounès, Marie de Hennezel, Roland Rech, Stan Rougier
- 2002: Le Grand Livre de la tendresse, Albin Michel,, collective, under the direction of Gérald Pagès, with participations by Boris Cyrulnik, Marie de Hennezel, Dr. Gérard Leleu, Jean-pierre Relier, Stan Rougier, Dr. Michèle Salamagne, Jacques Salomé, Paule Salomon, Christiane Singer
