= Rogier =

Rogier may refer to:

== Given name ==
Rogier is a Dutch masculine given name equivalent to Roger. People with this name include:

- Rogier van Aerde, pseudonym of Adolf Josef Hubert Frans van Rijen (1917–2007), Dutch writer and journalist
- Rogier Blink (born 1982), Dutch rower
- Rogier van der Heide (born 1970), Dutch designer
- Rogier Blokland (born 1971), Dutch linguist and Professor of Finno-Ugric languages at Uppsala University
- Rogier Bosman (born 1974), Dutch composer and arranger
- Rogier van der Heide (born 1970), designer born in the Netherlands who currently lives in Liechtenstein
- Rogier Dorsman (born 1999), Dutch Paralympic swimmer
- Rogier Hofman (born 1986), Dutch field hockey player
- Rogier Jansen (born 1984), Dutch basketball player
- Rogier Koordes (born 1972), Dutch former footballer
- Rogier Krohne (born 1986), Dutch footballer
- Rogier Meijer (born 1981), Dutch former footballer
- Rogier Michael (c. 1553 – 1623), Dutch-born German composer and Kapellmeister
- Rogier Molhoek (born 1981), former Dutch footballer
- Rogier van Otterloo (1941–1988), Dutch composer and conductor
- Rogier Stoffers (born 1961), Dutch cinematographer
- Rogier Telderman (born 1982), Dutch jazz pianist
- Rogier Veenstra (born 1987), Dutch footballer
- Rogier Verbeek (1845–1926), Dutch geologist and natural scientist
- Rogier Wassen (born 1976), Dutch tennis player
- Rogier van der Weyden (1399–1464), Early Netherlandish painter
- Rogier Windhorst (born 1954), astronomer and a professor of physics and astronomy at Arizona State University

== Surname ==
- Charles Rogier (1800–1885), Belgian liberal statesman, a leader in the Belgian Revolution of 1830
- Peire Rogier (1145–1197), an Occitan Auvergnat troubadour and cathedral canon from Clermont
- Philippe Rogier (1561–1596), Flemish composer active at the Habsburg court of Philip II in Spain

== Places ==
- Rogier metro station, Brussels metro station on the northern segment of line 2
- Rogier Tower, skyscraper in Saint-Josse-ten-Noode, Brussels, Belgium

== See also ==
- Roger
- Rogiera
- Rougier
- Rutger
