= Rutgers (disambiguation) =

Rutgers University is an American public research university.

Rutgers may also refer to:

- Rutgers (surname), people with the surname Rutgers
- Rutgers Glacier, Antarctica
- Rutgers Houses, a New York City public housing development
- Rutgers Presbyterian Church, a church in New York City
- Rutgers Street, a street in New York City
- Rutgers Preparatory School, a private preparatory school in Somerset, New Jersey, United States
- Rutgers WPF, a population concern organization
