= Rogelio =

Given name

Rogelio (Spanish pronunciation: [ro'xeljo]) is a masculine Spanish given name and a variant of the first name Roger. Notable people with the name include:

- Rogelio Antonio, Jr. (born 1962), Filipino chess player
- Rogelio Armenteros (born 1994), Cuban pitcher in Major League Baseball
- Rogelio Baón (1942–2008), Spanish journalist, lawyer and politician
- Rogelio Barriga Rivas (1912–1961), Mexican author born in Tlacolula, Oaxaca
- Rogelio Bernal Andreo (born 1969), Spanish-American astrophotographer
- Rogelio Chávez (born 1984) a Mexican footballer
- Rogelio de la Rosa (1916–1986), Filipino matinee idol of the 20th century
- Rogelio Delgado (born 1959), retired football central defender
- Rogelio Domínguez (1931–2004), Argentine football goalkeeper
- Rogelio Figueroa (born 1963), the 2008 gubernatorial candidate for the Puerto Ricans for Puerto Rico party
- Rogelio Frigerio (born 1970), Argentine economist and minister of interior
- Rogelio Julio Frigerio (1914–2006), Argentine economist, journalist and politician
- Rogelio Funes Mori (born 1991), Mexican football forward
- Rogelio López (born 1980), Mexican racecar driver from Aguascalientes
- Rogelio Marcelo (born 1965), Cuban boxer
- Rogelio Martínez (baseball) (1918–2010), pitcher in Major League Baseball
- Rogelio Martínez (boxer) (born 1974), Dominican Republic boxer
- Rogelio Ortega Martínez (born 1955), Mexican educator
- Rogelio Melencio (1939–1995), Filipino basketball player and coach
- Rogelio Miranda (1922–2021), Bolivian general
- Rogelio Ordoñez (1940–2016), Filipino writer, poet, playwright and columnist
- Rogelio Pina Estrada, Cuban attorney and member of the World Scout Committee
- Rogelio Pizarro (born 1979), male track and field athlete
- Rogelio R. Sikat (1940–1997), Filipino fictionist, playwright, translator and educator
- Rogelio Ramírez de la O, economist based in Mexico City
- Rogelio Rodriguez (born 1976), Mexican footballer
- Rogelio Roxas (died 1993), Filipino soldier and locksmith who found a hidden chamber full of gold
- Rogelio Salmona (1929–2007), Colombian architect of Sephardic and Occitan descent
- Rogelio Yrurtia (1879–1950), Argentine sculptor of the Realist school
- Sergio Rogelio Castillo (born 1970), Argentine-Bolivian football midfielder
- Patricio Santos Fontanet, (born 1979), full name Patricio Rogelio Santos Fontanet, Argentine singer-songwriter

== See also ==
- Captain Rogelio Castillo National Airport (IATA: CYW, ICAO: MMCY) is an airport located at Celaya, Guanajuato, Mexico
- Estadio Rogelio Livieres, multi-use stadium in Asunción, Paraguay
