= Stan Rougier =

French Catholic writer

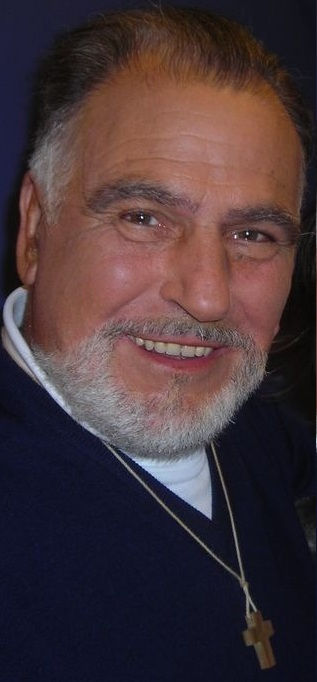
- Stan Rougier in 2007
- Born: 23 July 1930; Jurançon, France
- Other names: Joe

Stan Rougier (born June 23, 1930) is a French Catholic priest and writer, incardinated in the diocese of Évry-Corbeil-Essonnes.

== Biography ==
Born in Jurançon (Pyrénées-Atlantiques) into a family of six, he spent his youth in the Basque Country and Auvergne, where he practised various sports and, from very early on, scouting. He was the interpreter of the Burmese delegation at the 1947 Scout Jamboree in Moisson. In 1967, he was chaplain of the French delegation to the Scout Jamboree in Spokane.

At first an educator of young people in difficulty (Royat and Auxerre), then a nurse in Burkina Faso for a year, he then spent two years at the Issy-les-Moulineaux seminary. He was successively hired in a foundry, a building site, and later a garage. He spent two years at the Mission de France in Pontigny, then, at the end of 1957, entered the Dominican novitiate in Lille, which he left a year later. On December 18, 1960, in Meudon, after two years at the seminary of Versailles, he was ordained a priest for the diocese of Versailles. The next day he celebrated his first mass at the Church of Saint-Séverin in Paris. He then mainly exercised his ministry with young people, as chaplain for high school and college students, in Bezons, Houdan, Savigny-sur-Orge (Corot High School), Orsay (Faculty of Sciences of Orsay), Paris (Racine, Condorcet and Sainte-Marie-La Madeleine High Schools), Gif-sur-Yvette, Bures-sur-Yvette, Les Ulis, Marolles-en-Hurepoix. He currently belongs to the diocese of Essonne.

At the same time, at the end of the 1970s, he became a columnist for several newspapers and magazines (notably La Croix, Panorama, etc.), preacher on radio (France Culture) and on television for the program Le Jour du Seigneur. (France 2). He regularly participated in KTO Magazine on the KTO-TV channel. In 2007, an entire program was devoted to him: L'amour comme un défi. In 2013, he took part in the KTO Magazine show on June 2, 2013: La foi prise au mot. He was then seen on various France Télévisions stages, invited in particular by Patrick Poivre d'Arvor and Mireille Dumas, or even on BFM TV and on Grand Journal of Canal+, the day after the election of Pope Francis, whom he had met at length in Buenos Aires, 14 years earlier.

He traveled, most often by hitchhiking, in more than 80 countries, including: India, Nepal, Iran, Afghanistan, Chile, Argentina, Paraguay, Ecuador, Bolivia, Peru, Brazil, Guyana, Mexico, Nicaragua, Panama, Guatemala, Cuba, Norway, Sweden, Finland, Soviet Union, Iceland, United Kingdom, Ireland, Spain, Italy, Austria, United States, Canada, Holy Land, Algeria, Egypt, Morocco, Mauritania, Greece, Turkey, South Africa, Zaire, Senegal, Mali, Ivory Coast, Burkina Faso, China, Thailand, Indonesia, South Korea and Japan.

He was in demand for more than 30 years to give conferences, lead retreats and meetings, accompany pilgrimages, participate in interfaith dialogue, in France and outside France, and enthusiastically shared his faith in a God of Love throughout the world: France, Mauritius, Rodrigues Island, Réunion, Seychelles, Tahiti, New Caledonia, Marquesas Islands, Martinique, Guadeloupe, Mauritania, Morocco (in particular: Fez Music Festival), Cameroon, Democratic Republic of the Congo, Rwanda, United States, Quebec, Sweden, Norway, Switzerland, Belgium, Germany, England, Czech Republic, Croatia and the Holy Land (pilgrimages).

He published his first book L'Avenir est à la tendresse in 1977. For 25 years, he was a member of the Board of the AECEF, or Association des Écrivains Croyants d'Expression Française (Association of Believing Writers of French Expression).

He was often invited to Radio Notre-Dame on the program Écoute dans la nuit by its host Chantal Bally, in which he was interviewed by listeners and where he dealt with a subject determined by mutual agreement between them.

== Works ==
=== Books ===
- L'avenir est à la tendresse, Salvator, (1977)
- La Révolte de l'Esprit, with Olivier Clément, of Orthodox religion, Éditions Stock, (1978)
- Comme une flûte de roseau, Éditions du Centurion, (1982). Translated into Italian : Come un flauto di canna, Ed. Citadella editrice.
- François d'Assise, troubadour et prophète, Salvator, (1984) ; rewritten in 2017. With Béatrice Guibert.
- Introduction to the apostolic exhortation of Pope John Paul II : La réconciliation et la pénitence dans la mission de l’Église d'aujourd'hui, published at Éditions du Cerf, (1985).
- L'ombre obéit au soleil, Salvator, (1985)
- Jésus, (pour les 10-13 ans), Éditions du Cerf, (1983).
- Aime et tu vivras, Cana, 1985 ; rewritten and published by Desclée de Brouwer in 2015. With Béatrice Guibert.
- Puisque l'amour vient de Dieu, Desclée de Brouwer, (1988), rewritten in 2007. Translated into Spanish : Porque el amor viene de Dios, Editorial Sal Terrae , (2005).
- Clins Dieu, Salvator 1989.
- Prêtres de la Mission de France, Éditions du Centurion, (1991).
- La souffrance, Éditions du Centurion, (1993). With Marc Knobel et Hachemi Baccouche.
- Accroche ta vie à une étoile, Albin Michel, (1996).
- Nomade de l’Éternel, Éditions Stock, (1994).
- Montre-moi ton visage, Desclée de Brouwer, (1995).
- Quand l'amour se fait homme, Desclée de Brouwer, (1997).
- Une vie pour aimer, Mediaspaul, (2000).
- Dieu était là, et je ne le savais pas, spiritual autobiography, 1st tome, Presses de la Renaissance, (1998).
- Dieu écrit droit avec des lignes courbes, spiritual autobiography, 2nd tome, Presses de la Renaissance, (1999).
- Le quotidien de l'amour, Claire Vision Éditions (Louvain-la-Neuve, Belgium), (1997).
- Vos fils et vos filles seront prophètes, Éditions Bayard, (2000).
- Les rendez-vous de Dieu, Presses de la Renaissance, (2000).
- Paco Huidobro, un prophète à Buenos Aires, Salvator, (2000). Translated into Spanish : Un cura obrero entre nosotros, Editorial Claretiana
- Quête du sens, Albin Michel, (2000), rewritten in 2004. With Roland Rech, Lama Puntso, Swâmi Saraswati, Jean-Paul Guetny, Cheikh Khaled Bentounès, Richard Moss, Marie de Hennezel and Christiane Singer.
- Le Grand Livre de la tendresse, Albin Michel, (2002).
- Au commencement était l'amour, Presses de la Renaissance, (2003).
- Prières glanées, Éditions Fidélité, (2005).
- L'amour comme un défi, Éditions du Relié, (2004) ; rewritten and published by Albin Michel in 2006.
- La dépression, une traversée spirituelle, with avec Yves Prigent, Desclée de Brouwer, (2006).
- Saint François d'Assise, Pygmalion, (2006).
- Jusqu'où peut-on changer sa vie?, collectif, Éditions de l'Atelier, (2006). Under the direction of Alain Houziaux, with Jacques Lacarrière and Jean-Paul Willaime.
- Pourquoi je l'ai suivi, interview with Nathalie Calmé, Desclée de Brouwer, (2007)
- Innocence et culpabilité, Albin Michel, (2007). With Jean-Yves Leloup, Philippe Naquet, Paul Ricœur and Marie de Solemne.
- Florilège spirituel, Presses de la Renaissance, (2008).
- Saint François d'Assise ou la puissance de l'amour, Albin Michel, (2009).
- Entre larmes et gratitudes, les psaumes revisités, Desclée de Brouwer, (2013).
- Pour vous qui suis-je?, Editions Mame, (2013). With Corinne Prévost.
- Preface to two books by Bishop Bergoglio, today Pope Francis : La Miséricorde et Le Témoignage, (2013).
- La passion de la rencontre, Éditions du Relié, (2014). With Nathalie Calmé.
- Que peut-on dire aux hommes ?, Saint Exupéry en approche de Dieu, (2017). With Béatrice Guibert
- Journal d'un novice, Salvator, (2018).
