= Personne n'y avait pensé! =

French television game show

Personne n'y avait pensé! (Nobody had thought of that!) is a France 3 game show adapted from the BBC's Pointless. Presented by Cyril Féraud, it ran for five seasons in 2011, 2015–16 and 2018–21.

== Format ==
The rules are based on the British original. There are four teams of two people. All questions have previously been given to 100 members of the public, and the contestants seek to give the answer that they think the fewest members gave. Féraud gave the example in an interview that if the question were on European Union capitals starting with R, it would be better to go for Riga or Reykjavik than Rome. Giving a "pointless" answer (personne n'y avait pensé) before the jackpot round wins the duo €100.

The duo who score the highest in each round are eliminated, until the winning duo gets to play for a jackpot starting at €2,000. If they do not win the jackpot by giving a pointless answer on the final question (a correct answer given by no member of the survey), the money rolls over to the next episode.

Unlike Pointless, winning duos stay on for the next episode.

== Broadcast history ==
In June 2011, the programme was announced to begin in mid-July, as a weekly broadcast each Saturday afternoon. It began on 16 July at 5:15 pm; a review in Libération joked about how the show's unique format of earning as few points as possible did not extend to the losers winning money and the winners leaving with nothing. The season ran into December.

The return of Personne n'y avait pensé ! was announced in May 2015. The season ran twice a week from July 2015 to October 2016.

From 8 January 2018, Personne n'y avait pensé ! replaced Harry as a daily broadcast, preceding Féraud's other show, Slam. In November 2020, the show was axed as France 3 needed to cut one of its four daily game shows to match its commitment to show more regional programming; as the show was produced externally by Endemol Shine Group it could be cancelled without layoffs. The final episode was broadcast on 22 January 2021, attracting 962,000 viewers (11%).
