= Jonathan Rougier =

Jonathan Rougier may refer to:

- Jonathan Rougier (statistician), English statistician and university professor
- Jonathan Rougier (footballer) (born 1987), Argentine-Honduran footballer
