= Rogerius =

Rogerius can refer to the following things:

It is the Latin form of the given name Roger, and was the name of several medieval figures.

- Rogerius (physician) (also called Rogerius Salernitanus, Roger Frugard, Roger Frugardi, Roggerio Frugardo, and Roggerio dei Frugardi), a twelfth-century physician and surgeon from Salerno
- Rogerius of Apulia, in Italian Ruggero di Puglia, a thirteenth-century churchman who described the Tatar invasions in his work Carmen Miserabile
- Rogerius, Romania, a district or quarter (cartier in Romanian) of Oradea, the largest city of Bihor county, Romania
- Abraham Rogerius, 17th-century Dutch clergyman and translator active in India
