= Rüdiger =

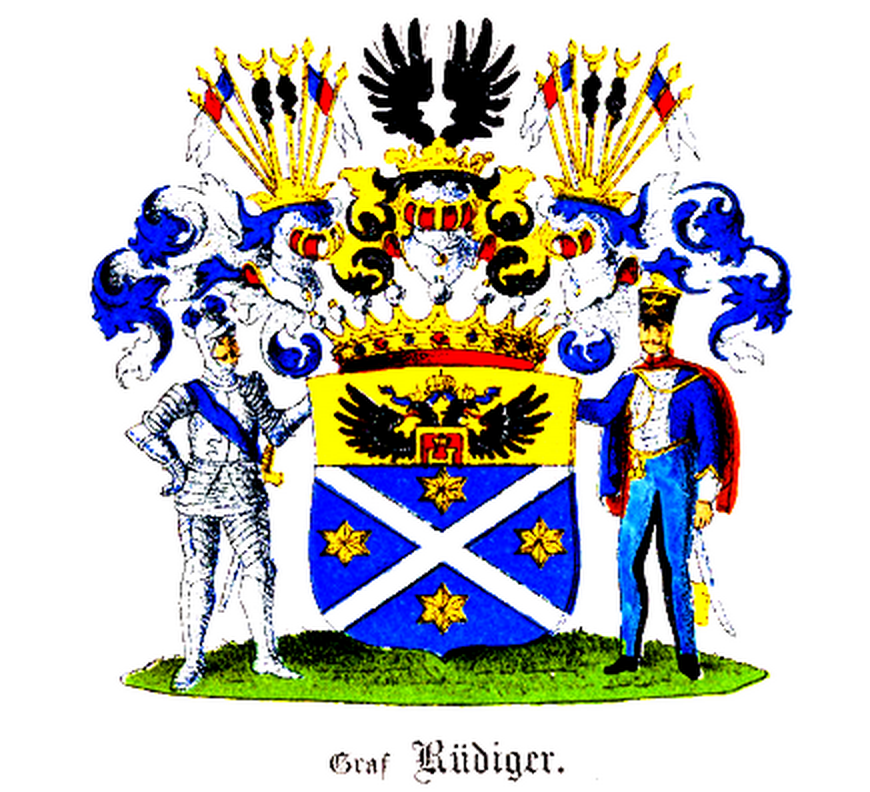
Coat of Arms Rydiger

Rüdiger (English Ruediger, Rudiger, Roger) is a German given name. The meaning comes from Old High German: hruod (fame) and ger (spear). The name became popular because of the character Rüdiger von Bechelaren from Nibelung.

== People named Rüdiger ==
- Aleksei Rüdiger (1929–2008), Patriarch Alexy II of the Russian Orthodox Church
- Antonio Rüdiger (b. 1993), German footballer
- Herbert Rudiger, (b. c. 1938), American radio technician and serial bomber who terrorized the city of Porto Alegre in Brazil with explosives in the span of one month
- Prince Rüdiger of Saxony (1953–2022), German prince
- Maria Rüdiger-Belyaeva, mother of John Shalikashvili
- Rüdiger Abramczik (b. 1956), German footballer
- Rüdiger Bieler (b. 1955), German-American biologist
- Rüdiger Gamm (b. 1971), German "mental calculator"
- Rüdiger von der Goltz (1865–1945), German army general during the First World War, one of the principal commanders of Finnish Civil War, Latvian War of Independence, Battle of Cēsis (1919) and Estonian War of Independence
- Rüdiger Haas (b. 1969), German tennis player
- Rüdiger Heining (b. 1968), German agrarscientist and economist
- Rüdiger Huzmann (died 22 February 1090), Bishop of Speyer from 1075 to his death
- Rüdiger Nehberg (1935–2020), German human rights activist, author and survival expert
- Rüdiger Overmans, (b. 1954), German historian specialized in World War II
- Rüdiger Safranski (b. 1945), German philosopher and author
- Rüdiger Schleicher (1895–1945), German resistance fighter
- Rüdiger Schmitt (b. 1939), German linguist, Iranologist, and educator
- Ernst Rüdiger von Starhemberg (1638–1701), Austrian politician, military general and chief of Vienna, one of the principal commanders of Battle of Vienna
- Ernst Rüdiger Starhemberg (1899–1956), Austrian nationalist and politician who helped introduce austrofascism and install a clerico-fascist dictatorship in Austria, chancellor of Federal State of Austria
- Rüdiger Vogler (b. 1942), German film actor

== See also ==
- Rutger
