= Rogério Bacalhau =

Portuguese politician

Rogério Bacalhau was the mayor of the Faro Municipality of Portugal.
