= Gérard Leleu =

French doctor and sexologist (1932–2024)

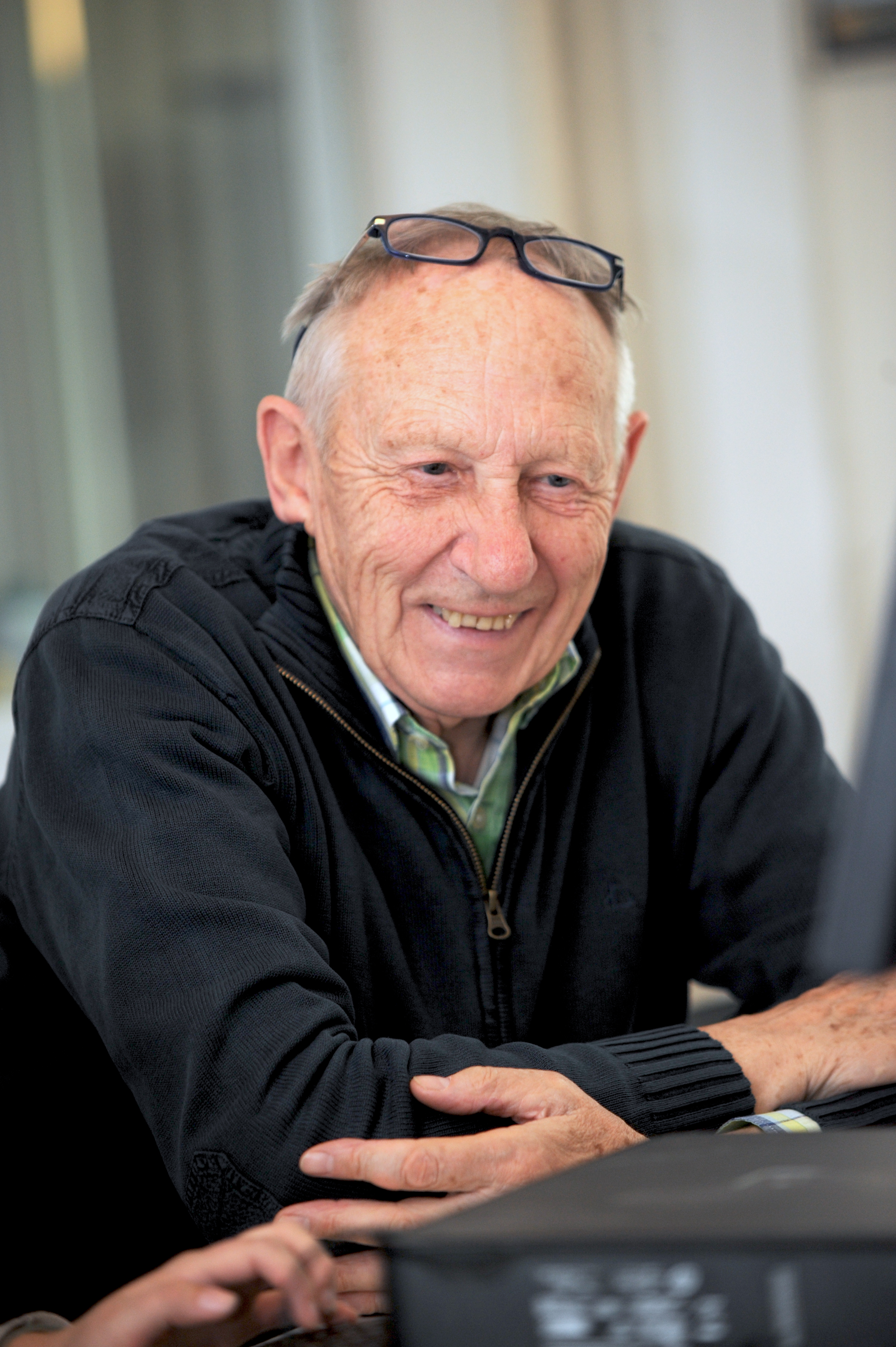
- Born: 28 September 1932; Lille, France
- Died: 2 October 2024 (aged 92); Saint-Nazaire, France
- Occupations: Doctor; Sexologist

Gérard Leleu (28 September 1932 – 2 October 2024) was a French doctor and sexologist. He died in Saint-Nazaire on 2 October 2024, at the age of 92.

== Publications ==
- Le Traité du désir (1999)
- Le Jardin des caresses (2000)
- Amour et calories (2001)
- L'Intimité et le couple (2002)
- Le Traité des caresses (2003)
- L'Écologie de l'amour (2003)
- La Fidélité et le couple (2004)
- Sexualité (2004)
- Le Traité du plaisir (2004)
- L'art de bien dormir à deux (2004)
- La caresse de Vénus (2005)
- De la peur à l'amour (2005)
- L'Homme (nouveau) expliqué aux femmes (2006)
- Comment le rendre fou (de vous) (2007)
- Le Traité des orgasmes (2007)
- Comment la rendre folle (de vous) (2008)
- L'art de la fellation L'art du cunnilingus (2008)
