= Roar Adler =

Norwegian newspaper manager

Roar Adler (4 September 1915 – 25 January 2007) was a Norwegian newspaper manager.

Representing the sports club IK Tjalve, he was a deputy board member of the Norwegian Athletics Association in 1953. In the 1950s he became a manager in the newspaper Arbeiderbladet. In 1959 he became a board member of Norske Avisers Landsforening, since a 1992 merger known as the Norwegian Media Businesses' Association, He served as deputy chairman from 1968 to 1970 and chairman from 1970 to 1972. From 1967 to 1975 he was the CEO in Arbeiderbladet. From 1969 to 1975 he also sat in a public committee that administered the press support. He died in 2007, and was referred to as "one of the most important press people" in post-war Norway.
