= Roger-Vasselin =

Roger-Vasselin is a surname. Notable people with the surname include:

- Christophe Roger-Vasselin (born 1957), French tennis player, father of Édouard
- Édouard Roger-Vasselin (born 1983), French tennis player
