= Rutgers (surname) =

Rutgers is a Dutch patronymic surname (Rutger's). Notable people with the surname include:

- An Rutgers van der Loeff (1910–1990), Dutch writer of children's novels
- Arend Joan Rutgers (1903–1998), Dutch physical chemist
- Bram Rutgers (1884–1966), Dutch politician, Governor of Suriname 1928–33
- Henry Rutgers (1745–1830), American Revolutionary War hero and philanthropist
- Hildegard Rütgers (born 1932), German classical contralto singer
- Jan Rutgers (1850–1924), Dutch physician, a significant figure in the Dutch sexual liberation movement
- Paul Rutgers (born 1984), Australian/South African baseball player
- S. J. Rutgers (1879–1961), Dutch Marxist theoretician and journalist, son of Jan Rutgers
- Victor Rutgers (1877–1945), Dutch legal scholar and politician, Minister of Education, Arts and Sciences
