= Roger Djikisna =

Chadian politician

Roger Djikisna (born 1942 in Saka) was a Chadian politician. He was elected to the National Assembly of Chad in the December 1969 election.
