= Harry (game show) =

- Genre: Game show
- Directed by: Didier Fraisse
- Presented by: Sébastien Folin
- Country of origin: France
- Original language: French
- No. of seasons: 1
- No. of episodes: 155

Production
- Running time: 26 minutes
- Production company: Big nose Games - Telfrance Games

Original release
- Network: France 3
- Release: November 12, 2012 – January 5, 2018

Harry is a French television game show broadcast that launched on France 3 from November 12, 2012 and ended on January 5, 2018. The show was hosted by Sébastien Folin. The show is based upon the contestants' ability to reform chopped up words.

The programme aired from Monday to Friday at 4:50 pm to 5:30 pm.

== Background ==
The program was created by Jean-Pierre Attal, a former game shows contestant. It was co-developed with the Newen and BigNose groups.

The credit's soundtrack is the work of Mam's, Y. Bourdin, B. Raffaelli and E. Rosso. Xavier Pujade-Lauraine is credited with both creative and broadcast design for the program.

== Overview ==
Four contestants face off against Harry, a virtual character shaped like a smiley who mixes syllables. They have to put back in the correct order words that have been chopped up into a series of rings that move onscreen. Following two rounds and a semifinal, only one contestant reaches the final.

== Rules ==
=== First round ===
The four contestants have to put back words (proper noun, common noun, adjective or verb) in the correct order as fast as possible. They win points based on the speed with which they answer. Two cross-referenced themes are presented by the host. The series is made up of five words to find. For the first four words: At the host's request, the first word is shown on the set screen. The letters that make up this word are divided within 3, 4, 5 or 6 rings. These movement-animated rings are set in disorder and appear simultaneously onscreen. The word is shown for 20 seconds.

After the first 10 seconds, a clue is given to the four contestants. Each contestant must, within the 20 seconds given to him, give his answer and confirm it. At the end of these 20 seconds, the word disappears from the screen. Each contestant's answer time is recorded and helps to establish their ranking, from the fastest to the slowest. Points are given based on this ranking: 5 points for the fastest, then 3 points for the second contestant, 2 points for the third and finally 1 point for the slowest contestant. If a contestant gives a wrong answer or does not confirm an answer within the 20 seconds, they receive no points.

For the fifth word: the rules are the same as with the first four words. But the points distribution is not: the fastest contestant wins 10 points, 6 points for the second contestant, 4 points for the third and finally 2 points for the slowest contestant. Following these five words, each contestant's console shows the number of points accumulated. The contestant with the fewest points is eliminated and leaves the Game for good. The three remaining contestants are qualified to take part in the second round.

=== Second round ===
The contestants’ scores are reset. The challenge given during this round changes from one show to another based on a predetermined order each week:

- Picture challenge: The remaining contestants play with a series of five words shown one after the other. For each word, the letters or groups of letters are separated and appear in a series of 3, 4, 5 or 6 rings. These rings appears simultaneously, are disordered and movement animated. One of the groups of letters is replaced by a picture.
- Intruder challenge: The setup is the same as for the picture challenge. Instead of a picture, an extra ring containing a useless letter or group of letters is shown.
- Empty ring challenge: The setup is the same as for the picture and intruder challenges. Yet this time, one of the rings will be empty of the corresponding letter or group of letters.

For the first four words: A predetermined theme is indicated for each word. At the host's request, the first word is shown on the set screen. The letters and/or images/empty rings that make up this word are divided within 3, 4, 5 or 6 rings. These movement-animated rings are set in disorder and appear simultaneously onscreen. The word is shown for 20 seconds. After the first 10 seconds, a clue is given to the three remaining contestants. Each contestant has on his console a touch screen enabling him to set the rings in the correct order so as to find the word in its correct spelling. Each contestant must confirm his answer. At the end of these 20 seconds, the word disappears from the screen.

Each remaining contestant's answer time is recorded and helps to establish their ranking, from the fastest to the slowest. Points are given based on this ranking: five points for the fastest, then three points for the second contestant and finally one point for the slowest contestant. If a contestant gives a wrong answer or does not confirm an answer within the 20 seconds, he receives no points. For the fifth word: the rules are the same as with the first four words. But the points distribution is not: the fastest contestant wins 10 points, six points for the second contestant and finally two points for the slowest contestant. Following these five words, each contestant's console shows the number of points accumulated since the beginning of the round. The contestant with the fewest points is eliminated and leaves the Game for good. The two remaining contestants are qualified to take part in the semifinal.

=== Semifinal ===
Scores are reset. A series of 9 words is prepared. Each word is divided into letters or groups of letters within a group of 4, 5 or 6 movement-animated rings. These rings appear one after the other with a 4 seconds interval between them. The clue appears first and the total onscreen time for each word is 20 seconds. The first of the two contestants that recognizes the word must press on his buzzer to give out loud his answer. If the contestant gives a correct answer within 3 seconds, he gets 1 point and the host asks for the next word. If the contestant gives a wrong answer, he can't buzz anymore. The other contestant can then answer when he wants, within of course the remaining time left before the 20 seconds are up. If he gives a correct answer, he gets 1 point. The first of the two contestants that reached 5 points qualifies for the final and the following show. The other contestant is eliminated and leaves the Game for good.

=== Final ===
The finalist is in front of Harry. He has 80 seconds to find 10 words in a list that passes before his eyes. Each word is chopped up in letters or groups of letters set within movement-animated rings. The difficulty of the words progressively increases the more words appear on screen, with an increasing number of rings. Each word is shown onscreen for a maximum of 8 seconds. However, if the contestant finds the word before the time is up, the next word is show. The answer is given out loud by the contestant. For each word found, the contestant goes up a notch on the winnings scale that ranges from €50 to €2000. For each wrong answer or lack of an answer once the 8 seconds are up, the contestant goes down a notch. The contestant wins the sum reached at the end of the 80 seconds. Furthermore, he is automatically selected to take part in the next show. His winnings are cumulative for show to show and are considered his for each show won..

=== The super champions ===
Nine contestants set records when they stepped onto the Harry set:

- Michèle took part in 27 finals and won 241 €00
- Ariane took part in 6 finals and won 5 €000
- Alexandre took part in 10 finals and won 4 €300
- Lionel took part in 4 finals and won 4 €200
- Pierre took part in 5 finals and won 3 €400
- Cyrille took part in 7 finals and won 3 €250
- Gwendal took part in 5 finals and won 2 €450
- Julien took part in 4 finals and won 1 €600
- Maxence took part in 6 finals and won 1 €050

== Broadcast ==
Harry is part of the daily game shows programming block of the channel. It is broadcast between Des chiffres et des lettres, countdown hosted by Laurent Romejko and Slam hosted by Cyril Féraud.

=== Show specials ===
- Junior Special: broadcast from December 31, 2012 through January 4, 2013
- Hosts Special for France 3's 40th anniversary: broadcast on January 8, 2013
- Plus Belle La Vie/Life’s So Sweet Special: broadcast on February 12, 2013
- Valentine's Day Special: broadcast on February 14, 2013
- Grandmother's Day Special: broadcast on March 1, 2013
- Women's Day Special: broadcast on March 8, 2013
- Saint Patrick's Day Special: broadcast on March 15, 2013
- Francophone Special: broadcast on March 20, 2013
- Sidaction/AIDS Awareness: broadcast on April 5, 2013
- Mother's Day Special: broadcast on May 24, 2013
- Father's Day Special: broadcast on June 14, 2013
- 1st Anniversary Special: Broadcast on November 12, 2013
- Family Special: Broadcast on December 23, 2013
- Sidaction Special: Broadcast on April 4, 2014
- Children Special: Broadcast on December 22, 2014
- 3rd Anniversary Special: Broadcast on November 12, 2015
- Thalassa 40th Anniversary Special: Broadcast on November 20, 2015
- Family Special: Broadcast on December 21, 2015
- Valentine's Day Special: Broadcast on February 12, 2016
- Francophone Journey Special: Broadcast on March 14, 2016
- Music Party Special: Broadcast on June 21, 2016
- Olympic Games Special: Broadcast on August 4, 2016
- Cancer Fight Special: Broadcast on October 13, 2016
- 1000th Special: Broadcast on October 20, 2016
- Easter Special: Broadcast on April 17, 2017
- Ligue Fight Special: Broadcast on October 26, 2017
- Best Tournament Players Special: Broadcast on January 5, 2018

== Around the show ==
=== Pranks ===
Flash mob: On January 24, 2013, the Harry team pranked Folin by organizing a flash mob during the taping of the show. The whole production team danced to the sound of "Boogie Wonderland" : With the help of the show's contestants and Gregory, the production team set up a new surprise for Folin.
