= Rogério Teófilo =

Brazilian politician (1957–2020)

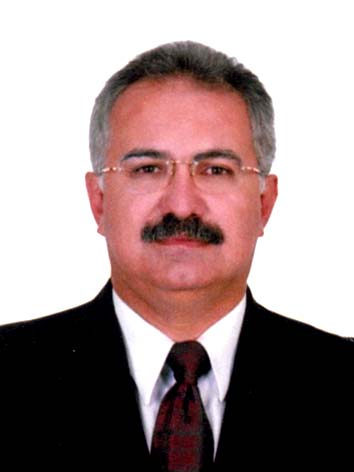

Federal Deputy for Alagoas
- In office 1 January 2003 – 31 January 2007

State Deputy for Alagoas
- In office 1 February 1991 – 1 February 2003

Mayor of Arapiraca
- In office 1 January 2017 – 7 August 2020

Personal details
- Born: 27 April 1957 Maceió, Alagoas, Brazil
- Died: 7 August 2020 (aged 63) Maceió, Alagoas, Brazil
- Party: PSDB
- Other political affiliations: PFL

Rogério Auto Teófilo (27 April 1957 — 7 August 2020) was a Brazilian lawyer, teacher, administrator and politician. As a member of the Liberal Front Party, he was a State Deputy and later Federal Deputy for Alagoas. He later switched to the Brazilian Social Democracy Party (PSDB), in which he serve as mayor of Arapiraca from 2017 until his death.

== Early life and education ==
Teófilo was born in Maceió, Alagoas, Brazil on 27 April 1957. He graduated from the law course at the Federal University of Alagoas (UFAL) in 1983. Previously, he graduated from Centro Universitário Cesmac in 1981 with a degree in administration. He joined the psychology course at the Psychology Institute of Maceió, an institute linked to UFAL, but abandoned it.

== Political career ==
In 1991, Teófilo was elected state deputy for Alagoas for the first time by the Liberal Front Party (PFL). He was re-elected to the position twice, in 1994 and 1998. In 2002, he was elected Federal Deputy for Alagoas with 64,899 votes. In the 2006 elections, he was reelected a vote of 57,651 votes.

In 2012, switching to the Brazilian Social Democracy Party (PSDB), Teófilo ran for mayor of Arapiraca where he won 40,363 votes, but was lost to Célia Rocha (PTB). In 2016, he ran again for the position, where he defeated Ricardo Nezinho (PMDB) by a difference of just 259 votes. He remained in the position of mayor of Arapiraca until his death, which was later held by his deputy, Fabiana Pessoa (Republicans).

== Death ==
In 2020, Teófilo was admitted to a private hospital in Maceió. He had a flu-like illness, which progressed to pneumonia, where he died on 7 August with suspected COVID-19.
