= Jonathan Rougier (statistician) =

Jonathan C. Rougier is professor of statistical science at the University of Bristol. Rougier is a specialist in the assessment of the risk from natural hazards.

He was an undergraduate at University College, Durham. He completed a doctorate at Durham University in 1996, the thesis being titled Price change and volume in a speculative market.

== Selected publications ==
- J.C. Rougier, R.S.J. Sparks, and L.J. Hill (eds). Risk and Uncertainty Assessment for Natural Hazards. Cambridge University Press, Cambridge, 2013.
