= Tout le monde veut prendre sa place =

French television game show

- Created by: Jean-Michel Salomon; Romain Cousi
- Country of origin: France
- Original language: French

Original release
- Network: France 2 TV5MONDE; La Deux; TV5 Québec Canada
- Release: July 3, 2006 – present

Tout le monde veut prendre sa place (sometimes abbreviated TLMVPSP) (English translation: Everyone Wants to Take His/Her Place) is a French television game show, broadcast since 3 July 2006, produced by Air Productions and Effervescence. The game is presented by Cyril Féraud and was previously hosted by Nagui, Laurence Boccolini, Jarry and Cyril Féraud. The game show is narrated alternatively by Gérard Pullicino, Serge Khalfon, Tristan Carné, Richard Valverde, Nicolas Druet, and Laurence Deloupy. Gérard Pullicino composed the broadcast music.

== Broadcasters ==
The program has been broadcast since 3 July 2006 on television from Monday to Saturday, then every day since June 2008. In France, the program is broadcast on France 2 at 11:55 and rebroadcast on TV5 Monde (every day) at 11:15 and 19:30. In Belgium, the program is broadcast on La Deux at 11:50, five minutes before the French broadcast. In Quebec, the program is broadcast on TV5 Québec Canada at 17:00. Due to the 2012 Summer Olympics in London, the show was not broadcast from 28 July to 12 August 2012.

=== Special programs ===
On 25 March 2007, on the occasion of the 50-year anniversary of the signing of the Treaty of Rome, a special program entitled Toute l'Europe veut prendre sa place was broadcast with six contestants coming from different countries in Europe. On 6 March 2008, for the 500th program. On 6 September 2009, the 1000th game, Dave (who was the topic of the quiz of the second round) came on the set during the second round. On 8 March 2011, 2012, and 2013, on the occasion of International Women's Day, the program had only women as challengers. On 14 November 2011, on the occasion of Nagui's 50th birthday, a special program gathered friends of Nagui, Isabelle Vitari, the comedian Frédéric Amico, Hélène de Fougerolles, Bénabar, the humorist Delphine McCarty and Bruno Solo playing for associations against Dominique, the greatest champion of the game. In the final round, Bruno Solo faced the champion. At the end of the program, the radio partners of Nagui, Manu Levy and Micho, disguised as pom-pom girls, surprised Nagui with a birthday cake. Throughout the program, the sequences of contestant presentations were replaced by sketches of Jonathan Lambert and his mother. On 10 December 2011, Frédéric Weis participated in the program. On 24 July 2012, for the 2000th program, a special with previous champions was organized. Dominique Bréard, the greatest champion of the program, defeated Fabien, another great champion of the game. On 9 February 2013, because the world ski championships in Austria were being broadcast by France 2 until 12:25, the program could not be seen in its entirety. It was therefore replaced by a "Best of" the run of the greatest champion of the game, Dominique.

== Game format ==
Six contestants play, responding to general knowledge questions, to become the challenger of the day and face off against, at the end of the show, the champion, with the goal of taking his place, hence the title of the show. A particularity of the game is that the champion maintains his or her title from program to program and accumulates winnings so long as he or she is not defeated by a challenger.

=== Les Qualifs ===
During the phase called Qualifs, six contestants (three men and three women, in alternating order) answer two general knowledge questions, choosing their method of answering:

- Duo: the contestant is given two answers and earns one point for choosing the correct answer.
- Carré: the contestant is given four answers and earns three points for choosing the correct answer.
- Cash: the contestant answers without being given any choices and earns five points for giving the correct answers.

The four contestants with the most points qualify for the next round. In case of a tie, the champion chooses who will qualify among those tied.

=== La Compet' ===
The contestants are quizzed on a category disclosed to the contestants prior to taping and which the contestants have therefore researched.

First, eight questions are posed simultaneously to all contestants who response with a touchscreen and a computer keyboard. Three of the questions are Duo, three question are Carré, and two questions are Cash. Points are awarded as above.

The ninth and final question is another Cash question, but it is different because each contestant receives his or her own question, selected by the champion. The champion is presented with four questions and chooses which contestant will answer orally. A correct answer is worth five points, but a wrong answer loses five points. It is therefore a way for the champion to help the most favorable contestants, the ones the champion judges to be weakest and least dangerous.

The contestant who ends this stage with the most points becomes the challenger and faces off against the champion in the final round of the game. Again, if there is a tie, the champion selects the challenger.

=== Le Défi ===
In Le Défi, four categories are given to the two adversaries. The champion chooses a category for the challenger and another category for himself or herself. The choice is strategic: the champion wants to have more points than the challenger but also knows that the challenger's score—not the champion's—determines the prize for winning (€100 per point scored).

Each category consists of six questions. For each question, the competitor can choose to play Duo, Carré, or Cash, with the same point values as before.

First, the challenger answers his or her questions, but the correct answers are not revealed until the end of the round; the champion therefore estimates how many points the challenger scored (hence the goal he or she must attain), and also knows whether he or she must take a risk playing Cash or can be more prudent. The champion answers his or her questions and his or her score is revealed after each question. At the end of the second category, the challenger's responses are checked and the score given.

If the challenger's score is less than or equal to the champion's, the champion retains the title and increases his or her total winnings. On the other hand, if the challenger's score is greater than the champion's, he or she can dethrone the champion. However, the champion has the possibility of buying back his or her seat from the challenger. The champion offers the challenger a part of the winnings accumulated from occupying the champion's seat. If the offer is accepted, the champion retains his or her title, but from the accumulated winnings, the amount offered to the challenger is deducted. The challenger leaves with the amount the champion offered, plus €100 per point scored. If the offer is not accepted, the champion loses the title and leaves with all of his or her winnings; the challenger becomes the new champion with winnings of €100 per point he or she scored in the last match.

At 10, 30 and 50 wins, the champion wins a trip. At 100 wins, he or she wins a car.

When the champion cannot attend the next show, he or she leaves with his or her winnings and the last challenger to have faced the champion in Le Défi takes the champion's place.

== Success ==
=== In France ===
For 2007, the program had a 21.3% market share.

Tout le monde veut prendre sa place, in terms of audience share, regularly beats Attention à la marche !, the game that airs at the same time on TF1. The first time, Tuesday 6 May 2008, it had 27.1% market share against 26.6% for Attention à la marche !. On December 22, 2008, it beat Attention à la marche ! with 2.8 million viewers against 2.7 million for the TF1 game. and then on 25 February 2009, with 2.7 million viewers against 2.6 million. From 16 to 19 March 2009, the France 2 game was again ahead of the TF1 game. On 8 April 2009, the show set a new record for audience in attaining 3033000 viewers for a 26.6% share of the audience. Since then, the game regularly is ahead of that of TF1.

From 8 to 12 November 2010, the show achieved its highest viewing figures to date of 3.62 million: a 31.5% share. The highest audience in terms of market share is 34%. In terms of viewers, the best audience for a program is 4,550,000.

== International versions ==
The show was piloted in the United Kingdom in 2010 as Hold on to Your Seat!, presented by Countdown warm-up man Greg Scott. Another pilot was produced in 2017.

Country	Local name	Presenter	Channel	Date of transmission
Algeria	لعبتك ديما معانا; Laeibatuk dima maeanan	Yasmeen Saouda	El Djazairia One	June 20, 2018 – August 23, 2021
France (original format)	Tout le monde veut prendre sa place	Nagui (2006–2021); Laurence Boccolini (2021–2023); Jarry (2023–2024); Cyril Féraud (2024–present)	France 2	July 3, 2006 – present
Japan	連続クイズ ホールドオン! Renzoku kuizu Hôrudo on!	Tomomitsu Yamaguchi and Toko Takeuchi	NHK	April 5, 2012 – March 20, 2014
Spain	Agárrate al sillón	Eugeni Alemany	Telecinco	July 13, 2025 – January 9, 2026
Turkey	Koltuk Sevdası	Umut Oğuz	aTV	November 29 – December 31, 2010
Ukraine	Втриматись у кріслі Vtrimatis' u krisli	Hryhoriy Herman	ICTV	January 4 – March 16, 2012
United Kingdom	Hold on to Your Seat!	Greg Scott	ITV1	2010 (pilot not picked up)
United Kingdom	Hold on to Your Seat!	Ben Shephard	ITV1	January 27, 2011 (pilot not picked up)
United Kingdom	Hold on to Your Seat!	Michael Ball	ITV1	January 27, 2011 (pilot not picked up)
United Kingdom	Hold on to Your Seat!	Greg Scott	ITV1	2017 (pilot not picked up)
