= Ruggero =

Given name

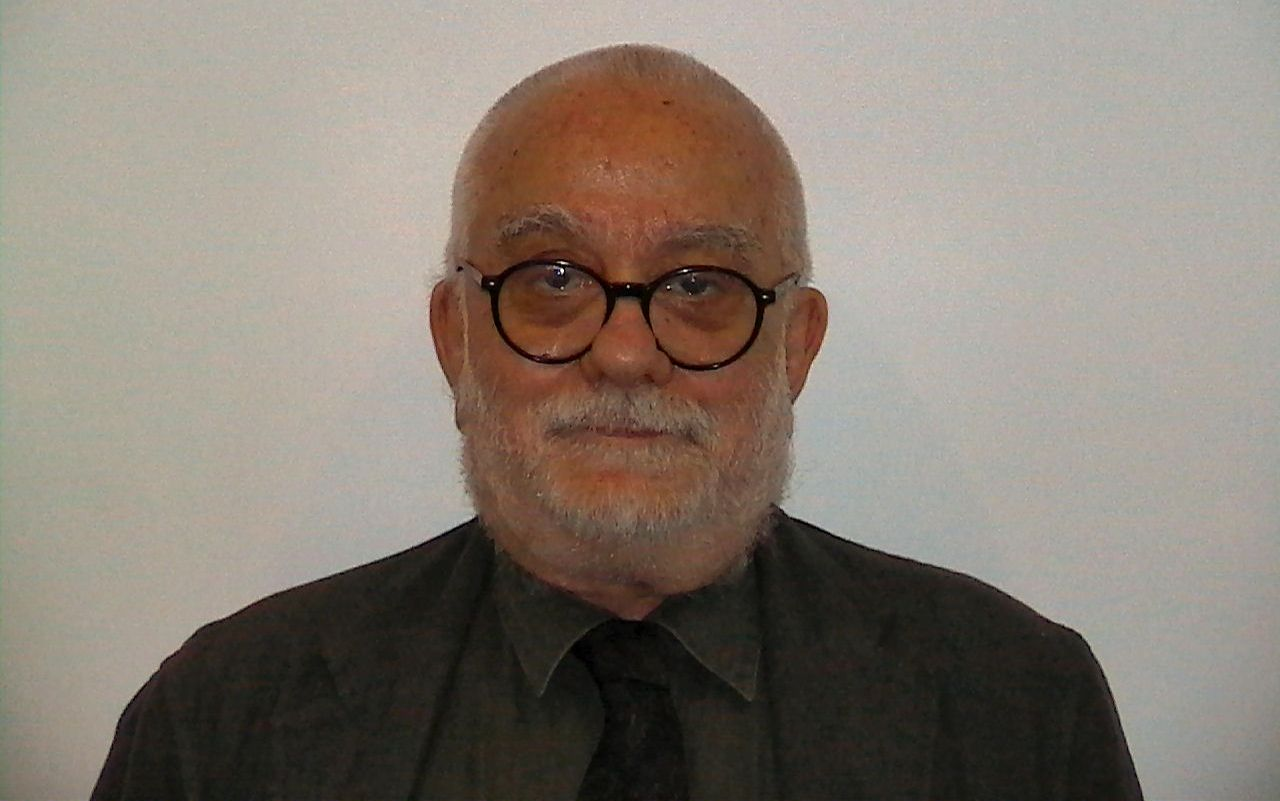
Ruggero Guarini

Ruggero (pronounced [rudˈdʒɛːro]), the Italian equivalent of Roger, may refer to:

- Ruggero I of Sicily (1031–1101) Norman king of Sicily
- Ruggero J. Aldisert (1919–2014), judge on the United States Court of Appeals for the Third Circuit
- Ruggero Berlam (1854–1920), Italian architect
- Ruggero Bonghi (1826–1895), Italian scholar, writer and politician
- Ruggero Borghi (born 1970), former Italian professional road bicycle racer
- Ruggero Cobelli (1838–1921), Italian entomologist
- Ruggero Deodato (born 1939), controversial Italian film director, actor and screenwriter, best known for directing horror films
- Ruggero Ferrario (1897–1976), Italian racing cyclist and Olympic champion in track cycling
- Ruggero Leoncavallo (1857–1919), Italian opera composer
- Ruggero Luigi Emidio Antici Mattei (1811–1883), Italian prelate of the Roman Catholic Church
- Ruggero Maccari (1919–1989), Italian screenwriter
- Ruggero Maregatti (1905–1963), Italian athlete who competed mainly in the 100 metres
- Ruggero Marzoli (born 1976), Italian professional road bicycle racer
- Ruggero Mastroianni (1929–1996), Italian film editor
- Ruggero Oddi (1864–1913), Italian physiologist and anatomist
- Pier Ruggero Piccio (1880–1965), Italian aviator and the founding Chief of Staff of the Italian Air Force
- Ruggero Raimondi (born 1941), Italian Bass-Baritone opera singer and sometime screen actor
- Ruggero Santilli (born 1935), Italian-American physicist and a proponent of fringe theories
- Ruggero Verity, Italian entomologist who specialised in butterflies

== See also ==
- Ruggiero
- Castel Ruggero, an Italian village in Campania
