= Ruggiero (given name) =

Ruggiero is an Italian masculine given name. Notable people with the name include:

- Ruggiero di Lauri, or Roger of Lauria (1245–1305), Italian admiral who was commander of the fleet of Aragon
- Ruggiero Giovannelli (1560–1625), Italian composer of the Renaissance and Baroque eras
- Ruggiero Leoncavallo (1857–1919), Italian opera composer
- Ruggiero Ricci (1918–2012), Italian-American violin virtuoso
- Ruggiero Rizzitelli (b. 1967), Italian footballer who played in Germany

== See also ==
- Ruggiero (character), character in Ludovico Ariosto's Orlando furioso
