= Rogier van Aerde =

Dutch writer and journalist

Rogier van Aerde, pseudonym of Adolf Josef Hubert Frans van Rijen (4 October 1917 in Rotterdam – 8 November 2007 in Apeldoorn), was a Dutch writer and journalist. He made his début in 1941 with Kaïn, which was an immediate success. The Dutch poet and essayist Anton van Duinkerken said it was "A masterly début".

In Van Aerde's obituary which appeared in 2007 in 'Trouw', it was said that: "Kaïn was a big success and was even translated, but Frans van Rijen didn't get a penny from it. Just like his father Aad van Rijen he did not have a mind for business. With his publisher 'Urbi et Orbi' he signed a contract stating that he never would earn more than 1000 guilders and that he was not allowed to get another publisher until 1950. Moreover, the book was banned by the Germans, who claimed it was too "Jewish-minded". They also checked if the writer was an Aryan."

As a journalist, Rogier van Aerde also wrote reports for De Volkskrant and the Katholieke Illustratie and later on he made contributions to Margriet and Nieuwe Revu. The books he wrote after Kaïn did not get much attention and he never equalled the success of his début.

== Sources ==
- Rogier van Aerde on dbnl
- Dutch Wikipedia
