= Roger Dodger (phrase) =

World War II figure of speech

The phrase "Roger Dodger" originated during World War II and was verbally circulated throughout the United States military as a part of a story about a pilot or soldier who added his own flair to radio phraseology. The punch line of this story is: "Roger Dodger, you old codger!" The story was passed along by servicemen in all branches of the military.

Here is one version of the story set in the Pacific Theater of Operations of World War II:

A squadron of Navy aircraft was returning to base after a wildly successful mission. One pilot in particular was feeling especially cocky. After receiving landing instructions, the pilot signed off his radio message with, "Roger Dodger!"

The next transmission was from an irate-sounding naval officer. He bellowed, "In this man's Navy, there will be no flippant remarks on the radio!" He went on to say that he was a U.S. Navy Commander and intended to find the offender to personally reprimand him.

The rambunctious pilot acknowledged by saying, "Roger Dodger, you ol' codger. I'm a Commander too!"

It is easy to see how the story can be adapted to different military branches and duties but still retain the essential ingredients: the successful war hero in the thick of the action and the overbearing officer concerned only with strict adherence to the regulations.

Over several decades, the story faded into folklore, but the phrase "Roger Dodger" retains widespread recognition in the United States, even though most people do not know what it really means or its origin. It is generally used in a flippant way, often in seeming mocking of police or military authority.

The International Civil Aviation Organization (ICAO) officially defines the word "roger" to mean "I have received all of your transmission." For example, a pilot would say "roger" in response to an advisory from air traffic control. "Roger" is not currently the word for the letter "R" in most radio alphabets; "Romeo" is. However, in modern times, pilots must read back (repeat) air traffic control clearances to verify they heard them correctly, but most instructions may be "rogered". The word "roger" is still used in modern aviation radio communication, but the phrase "roger dodger" is not recognized by ICAO.
