= Mireille Dumas =

French journalist, television producer and presenter

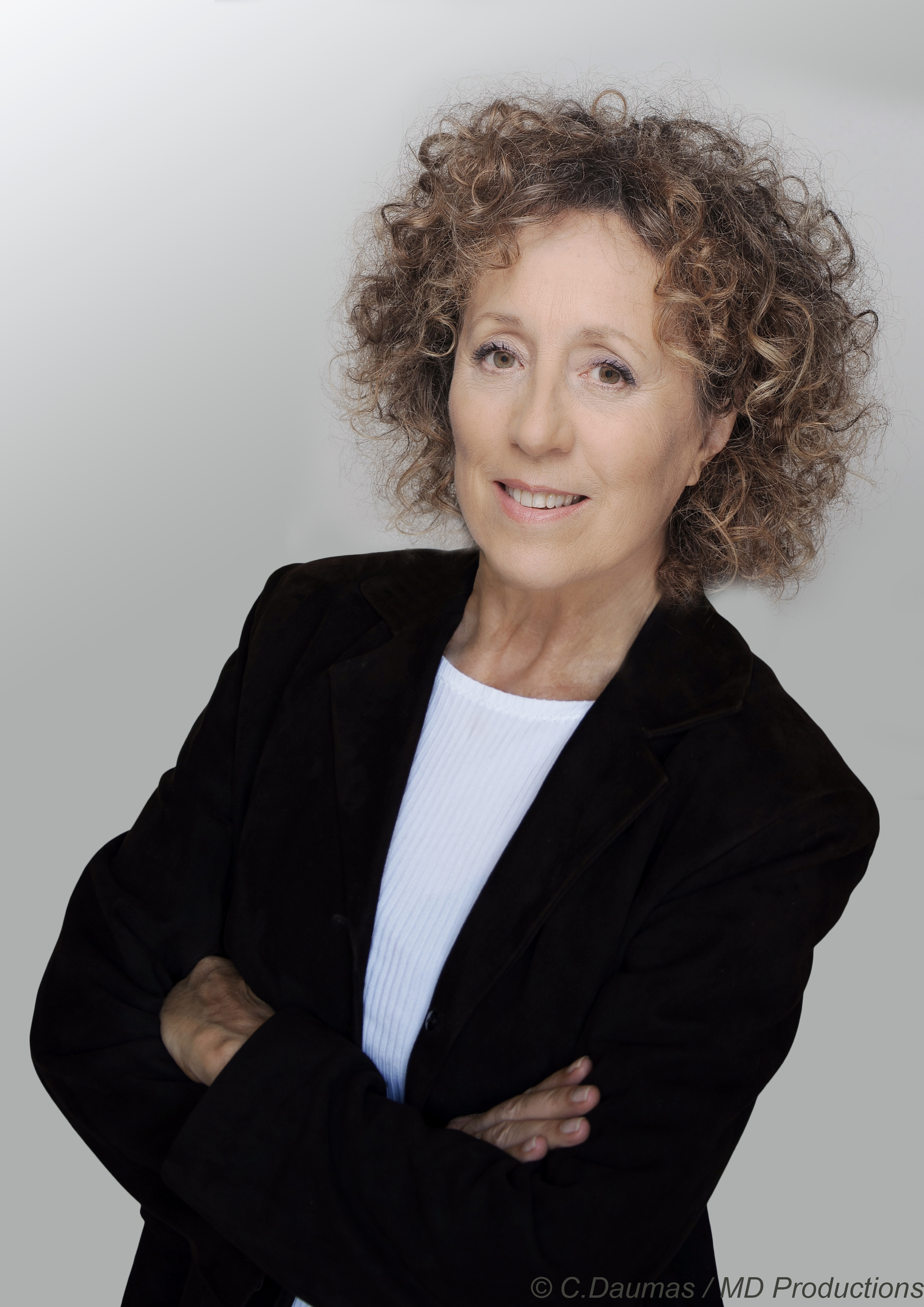
- Mireille Dumas, 2018
- Born: 10 September 1953 (age 72); Chartres, Eure-et-Loir, France
- Occupations: Journalist, television presenter, producer
- Years active: 1992–present (television)
- Notable credit(s): Vie privée, vie publique (2000–11); Signé Mireille Dumas (2011–present)
- Television: France 2 (1992–2000); France 3 (2000–present)

Mireille Dumas (born 10 September 1953) is a French journalist, television producer and presenter.

== Biography ==
Mireille Dumas was born in Chartres in the department of Eure-et-Loir, the fifth of six children. Her father was a teacher and died when she was only aged 3. Her mother who was also a teacher in Ymonville raised her children alone. Mireille Dumas is married to the television director Dominique Colonna.

== Career ==
Mireille Dumas began her career in theatre and was a member of the Peter Brook troupe. She then produced some documentaries after a short appearance on Antenne 2 in the program Sexy Folies in 1986. Among those that were primed, these include Le passé retrouvé : Alice Sapritch en Turquie, nominated at the 7 d'Or in 1990, and the trilogy Crimes et passions, laureate of the European Film Awards in 1991.

In July 1991, she created the production company MD productions, orientated on documentaries about society subjects. These films deal with sensitive, controversial and even intimistic themes, like Les Enfants de Medellin broadcast on France 2 in 1994, or even Graine de top-models in 1996.

But it is by creating and presenting programs specialized in interviews in an intimate way, with well-known or anonymous persons, that Mireille Dumas became one of the emblematic figures of the French audiovisual field. Starting in September 1992, Bas les masques is one of these first programs, but had to be interrupted soon after. In addition, Mireille Dumas then presented La Vie à l'endroit from 1997 to 2000 on France 2.

From 2000 to 2011, she presented Vie privée, vie publique broadcast on France 3. In her interviews, she estimates that the step is strongly influenced by psychoanalysis. Mireille Dumas celebrated her 25 years of television on 5 May 2007, presenting an exceptional broadcast of Vie privée, vie publique. Since September 2011, she presents the series of documentaries Signé Mireille Dumas.

On 12 March 2012 she was chosen to present, along with Cyril Féraud, the 57th Eurovision Song Contest, which took place live from Baku in Azerbaijan. She repeats in 2013 for the 58th edition in Malmö, Sweden.

== Bibliography ==
- Paroles interdites, Éditions N°1, 2001 ISBN 978-2863915912
- Passions criminelles, with Yann Queffélec, Éditions Fayard, 2008 ISBN 978-2213635033

== Honours ==
- Officer of the Ordre des Arts et des Lettres in 2007
- Chevalier of the Legion of Honour in 2010
