= Agnes Hsu-Tang =

Taiwan-born American archaeologist

- 徐心眉
- Hsu-Tang in 2018
- Born: Agnes Hsin Mei Hsu; 1972 (age 53–54); Taipei, Taiwan
- Education: Bryn Mawr College (BA); University of Cambridge; University of Pennsylvania (MA, PhD)
- Occupations: Archaeologist, art historian, author, activist-philanthropist
- Spouse: Oscar Tang (m. 2013)

Agnes Hsin Mei Hsu-Tang (Chinese: 徐心眉) is a Taiwan-born American archaeologist and art historian. On October 19, 2021, she became the first person of Asian heritage to be elected board chair of one of the oldest historical institutions in America, the New-York Historical Society, founded in 1804. She is chairwoman of the New-York Historical Society board of trustees and Co-chair of The Met Museum's Objects Conservation Visiting Committee. She is a distinguished consulting scholar at the University of Pennsylvania Museum of Archaeology and Anthropology. Hsu-Tang works in cultural heritage protection and rescue and has advised UNESCO and the U.S. Cultural Property Advisory Committee during the Obama Administration. Hsu-Tang received IIE's Centennial Medal in 2019 for her longtime work in cultural protection and rescue. She co-founded the Hsu-Tang Library for Classical Chinese Literature at Oxford University, the Tang Center for Silk Road Studies at Berkeley, and the Tang Center for Early China at Columbia University.

== Early life and education ==
Hsu-Tang was born in Taipei and educated in the US and England. Press in Taiwan, Singapore, Hong Kong, China, and France have reported on her family's ancestry to two historical lineages of scholar-officials, the late Ming dynasty imperial Catholic minister Hsu Kuang-ch'i and the Qing dynasty Minister of War Chi Yun. Her paternal ancestor Hsu Kuang-ch'i, known by his baptismal name Paolo in the West, was the late 16th-century Catholic Ming Dynasty imperial minister and statesman who, with Matteo Ricci, engaged in the first cross-cultural exchanges and translations of scientific and philosophical texts in classical Chinese and Latin, for which he has been beatified by the Vatican.

Hsu-Tang studied classical archaeology and English literature at Bryn Mawr College and has an M.A. in Asian and Middle Eastern studies from University of Pennsylvania. In 2003, she received a pre-doctoral Mellon Fellowship to study the history of science at the Needham Research Institute at Cambridge University, where she conducted GIS-based analysis of a set of ancient maps and published "An Emic Perspective on the Mapmaker's Art in Western Han China" in the Journal of the Royal Asiatic Society. She received a Ph.D. in Chinese art and Archaeology from the University of Pennsylvania in 2004; her dissertation was titled "Pictorial Eulogies in Three Eastern Han Tombs."

== Career ==
Hsu taught Silk Road art and archaeology at Brown University from 2004 to 2007. From 2007 to 2008, she received a second Mellon Fellowship as a postdoctoral researcher in Classics at Stanford University. and published "Structured Perceptions of Real and Imagined Landscapes in Early China" in Geography and Ethnography: Perceptions of the World in Pre-Modern Societies, edited by the Swiss historian Kurt Raaflaub and English classicist Richard J. A. Talbert.

From 2006 to 2013, Hsu served on UNESCO scientific committees for World Heritage Sites during which she conducted three missions to Uzbekistan, Turkmenistan, and Western China, and published a white paper "The Exceptional Universal Value of the Road Systems in Ancient Empires: A Comparative Study of the Chinese Oasis Route of the Early Silk Road and the Qhapag Ñan" Hsu worked in the Taklamakan Desert.

Hsu was active in film projects from 2008 to 2015. Hsu was the host of the archaeology series Mysteries of China on the History channel, and a contemporary Chinese art series for Discovery Channel Asia, in which she interviewed artists Xu Bing, Zhang Huan, Li Zhen, and Chihung Yang, and the series premiered during Art Basel Hong Kong in 2014 at the Asia Society Hong Kong Center. Her other TV credits include "The Giant Buddha at Leshan" (2009) and "Xi'an: China's Forgotten City" (2010) on Discovery USA, "China's Terracotta Warriors" on PBS (2011), and Mankind: The Story of All of Us series on History Channel (2012).

In 2015, Hsu-Tang joined Columbia University as an adjunct senior research scholar. In 2018, Hsu-Tang was appointed distinguished consulting scholar at the University of Pennsylvania Museum of Archaeology and Anthropology.

== Philanthropy, activism and honors ==
Hsu-Tang is known to be actively engaged in social justice projects, including providing leadership support for New-York Historical Society's exhibitions: Chinese in America: Exclusion/Inclusion (2014-2015) and Dreaming Together (2020-2021), Opera Saint Louis's An American Soldier, Santa Fe Opera's Dr. Sun Yat-sen and M. Butterfly.

Hsu-Tang leads New-York Historical Society's capital project to build a 70,000 square foot annex designed by Robert A. M. Stern Architects, with one floor dedicated to collaborative efforts with the American LGBTQ+ Museum and state-of-the art classrooms for N-YHS's Tang Academy for American Democracy. She also developed and supports the New-York Historical Society–CUNY Museum Studies program. The Tang Academy for American Democracy, a program that teaches democracy to fifth and sixth grade students in New York City public schools, is among the many projects that Hsu-Tang has supported at the New-York Historical Society.

Hsu-Tang was a managing director on the board of the Metropolitan Opera from 2014 to July 2021 and is known to support new works and contemporary productions such as Exterminating Angel, L'amour de loin, and Akhanaten. In October 2021, Hsu-Tang became chair of the New-York Historical Society board of trustees.

In 2018, Hsu-Tang and her husband Oscar Tang were listed among Town and Country's 50 most influential American families in media, art, and culture.

During the COVID pandemic, she co-founded The Yellow Whistle campaign to combat anti-Asian violence and historical discrimination against Americans of Asian descent. The campaign distributed 500,000 free customized yellow whistles emblazoned with the slogan "WE BELONG" at rallies and through a national alliance of activist organizations and has received extensive national press coverage to raise awareness.

In December 2021, Hsu-Tang and her husband donated $125 million towards renovations at the Metropolitan Museum of Art.

On March 15, 2023, Hsu-Tang received The Met Museum's Women Leaders Award, with New York Governor Kathy Hochul, Congresswoman Nydia Valesquez, and curator Jasmine Wahi. Hsu-Tang received the Statue of Liberty Ellis Island Award on May 25, 2023, at the historical great hall on Ellis Island, with Grammy-winning American record executive Clive Davis and Liberty Mutual's CEO and Chairman David H. Long.

In 2026, Hsu-Tang and her husband were recognized in TIME magazine's most influential people in philanthropy of 2026.

== Personal life ==
Hsu married philanthropist and financier Oscar Tang in a private ceremony at the 17th-century Historic Christ Church with celebrations at the Tides Inn Resort in Lancaster County, Virginia on May 18, 2013.
