= Gu (vessel) =

Ancient Chinese ritual bronze vessel

- Chinese: 觚
Transcriptions
Standard Mandarin
- Hanyu Pinyin: gū
- Wade–Giles: ku^{1}
- IPA: [kú]
Yue: Cantonese
- Yale Romanization: gū
- Jyutping: gu1
- IPA: [ku˥]
Old Chinese
- Zhengzhang: *kʷaː

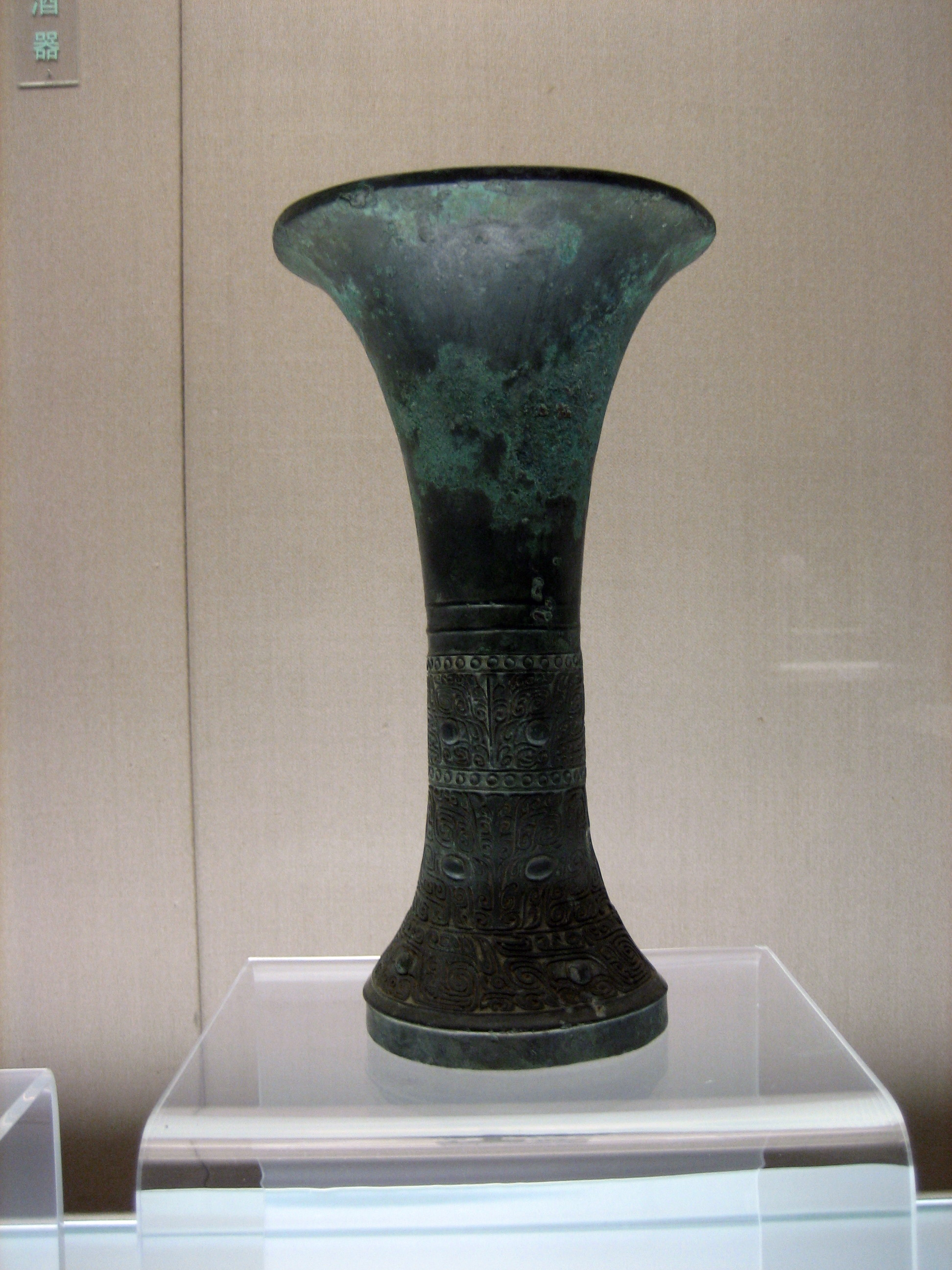
A gu from the middle Shang dynasty, Shanghai Museum, Shanghai, China

A gu is a type of ancient Chinese ritual bronze vessel from the Shang and Zhou dynasties (1600–256 BC). It was used to drink wine or to offer ritual libations.

A gu is tall and slender, with a slightly flared base that tapers to a slim center section before widening again into a trumpet-like mouth, wider than the base. Its surface is often decorated with taotie.

== The beginning of the gu vessel ==
The gu vessel was known for its use as a wine-drinking vessel. It is said to have developed from other elaborate cups that also had high stems and were found in Neolithic cultures. Inscriptions have been found on ancient vessels stating that it was common to drink wine in Chinese cultures. The creation of a vessel such as the gu makes sense in modern times because of its shape. The long stem made it easy to hold and sip from, while still allowing it to take on unique and elegant features. The drinking of wine was made from this cup.

== Early inspiration for the creation of the gu vessel ==
Throughout the hundreds of Neolithic to early dynastic sites discovered in China, ritual vessels ranging from clay to bronze are often found in the tombs of these sites. The form, shapes, and décor, provide hints to every vessel's function as well as the early beliefs that inspired them. Early Chinese religion has been difficult for scholars to understand due to a lack of extensive archaeological evidence on Neolithic religious philosophies and ritual practices. The early Shang dynasty, however, had a much more concrete religion in regards to beliefs and practices ranging from ancestor worship to funerary rituals, and a developed system to perform sacrifices. As these beliefs could have extended back into earlier periods in China, a common center of worship included such elements such as ancestors, fertility concerns as well as other spirits or gods of the natural elements.

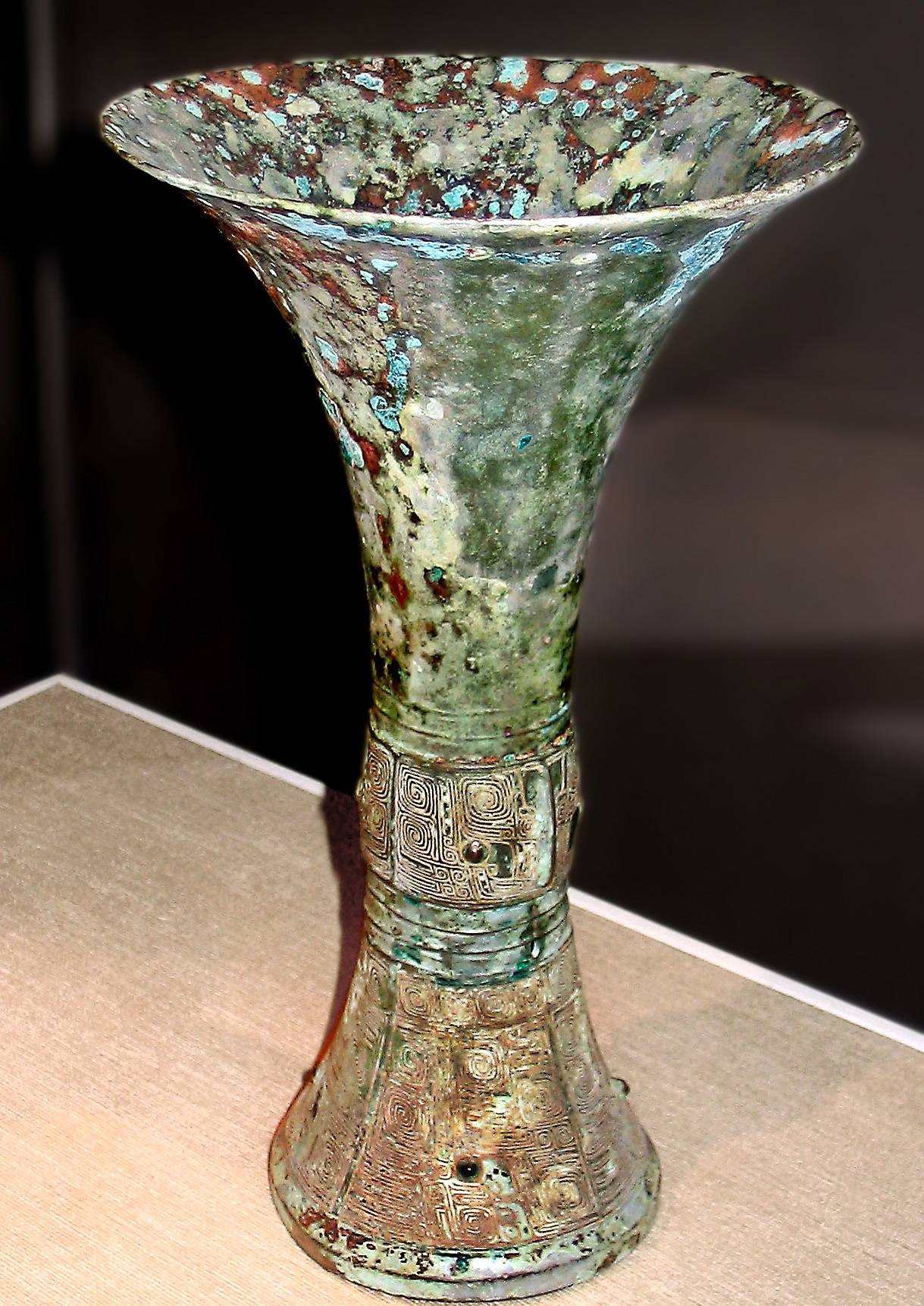
A gu from the Shang dynasty, Arthur M. Sackler Gallery, Washington, D.C.

The ritual vessels of early China are an extension of the spiritual or religious world, in which the powers that seemed to exist in nature may have carried a high influence in the inspiration of the vessels. The powers of nature included those that could have resided in animals, plants, water, sickness, death, and eventually the afterlife, all of which coexisted with people as having a high influence on one's life. In some cases, ritual vessels provided a way to maintain harmony between the spirit world and the earthly realm through vessels holding sacrifices, or vessels like the gu being drunk by humans in ritual ceremonies.

== Function and use ==
The gu was a common wine vessel to be found in high class areas. This wine vessel has been found in places such as meeting areas were high class Chinese members would gather for wine with one another. The gu vessel can be unique in a number of ways. The more elegant styled vessels with more relief and design would be found more commonly in the high class surroundings. The simpler, tall and narrow, gu vessels would be found throughout the family's households. According to the Tsun family, the gu vessel was found to be listed under the "Wine Containers" list of artifacts that have been found in the Shang civilizations. This allows archaeologists to focus on locations of gu vessels to help indicate the class status of the site.

=== Examples of function ===
In Book 6, verse 25, of the Confucian Analects, a gu is referred to. It was a cup to be drunk from specifically in religious sites but first by the rulers of the Shang dynasty. Its functional use for a human rather than a spirit is also noted based on the construction of the gu vessel for its design is logical in that it can hold liquid and can be easily held in one's hand unlike other wine vessels.

The only evidence we have of ritual use of this vessel is its strong association with wine, spirits, and high class rulers. Later engraved vessels help support the significance of ritual wine drinking as part of ritual ceremony. The gu vessel appears in an engraving of a ritual scene found on a yi vessel discovered in a tomb in Shaanxi in which the gu being used in the engraving highly resembles the gu of the Shang.

== The name ==
The term gu had not been ever previously found inscribed on any other vessels and the first mention of this term was not until the 11th century found in early artist and antiquarian, Li Gonglin's writings. Li, a painter and avid collector of early bronzes, is credited for designating the name of the gu vessel based on an experiment on a gu vessel he owned. In his experiment, he measures that his gu vessel can hold exactly two pints or sheng of liquid which is equal to a gu while the designated character means “ridge” or "flange" based on those decorative elements found on his gu.

== Historical developments and examples ==
Although gu is name of a bronze vessel form, similar vessels have been made of clay and wood long before the Bronze Age.

=== Bronze gu ===
Based on archaeological discoveries, gu is one of the most common bronze vessel forms in the Shang dynasty (around 16th century to 11th century B.C.). Xiaoneng Yang points out that gu became less popular in the Western Zhou dynasty (around 11th century to 8th century B.C.), but the style of the late Shang period, or rather the Anyang Style, survived and the style of the early Shang period also revived. Moreover, gu disappeared in the reign of King Mu of Zhou in the 10th century B.C.E.

==== Zhengzhou phase (Erligang period) of the Shang dynasty ====
One bronze gu has been discovered at the north corner of the upper level of the Tomb M2 in Erligang, Zhengzhou, an early Shang dynasty site. Decors on this vessel are concentrated on a band at the lower part of its body, which, according to Max Loehr, is a characteristic of Early Shang bronze.

The gu from Erligang has some cross-shape holes on its foot, which is a common feature among some Shang bronzes. For example, all the gu vessels and some other bronzes from Chenggu, Shaanxi have this kind of cross-shape holes, though their diverse decors and shapes suggest they might have been made in different time periods in the Shang dynasty.

==== Anyang phase of the Shang dynasty ====
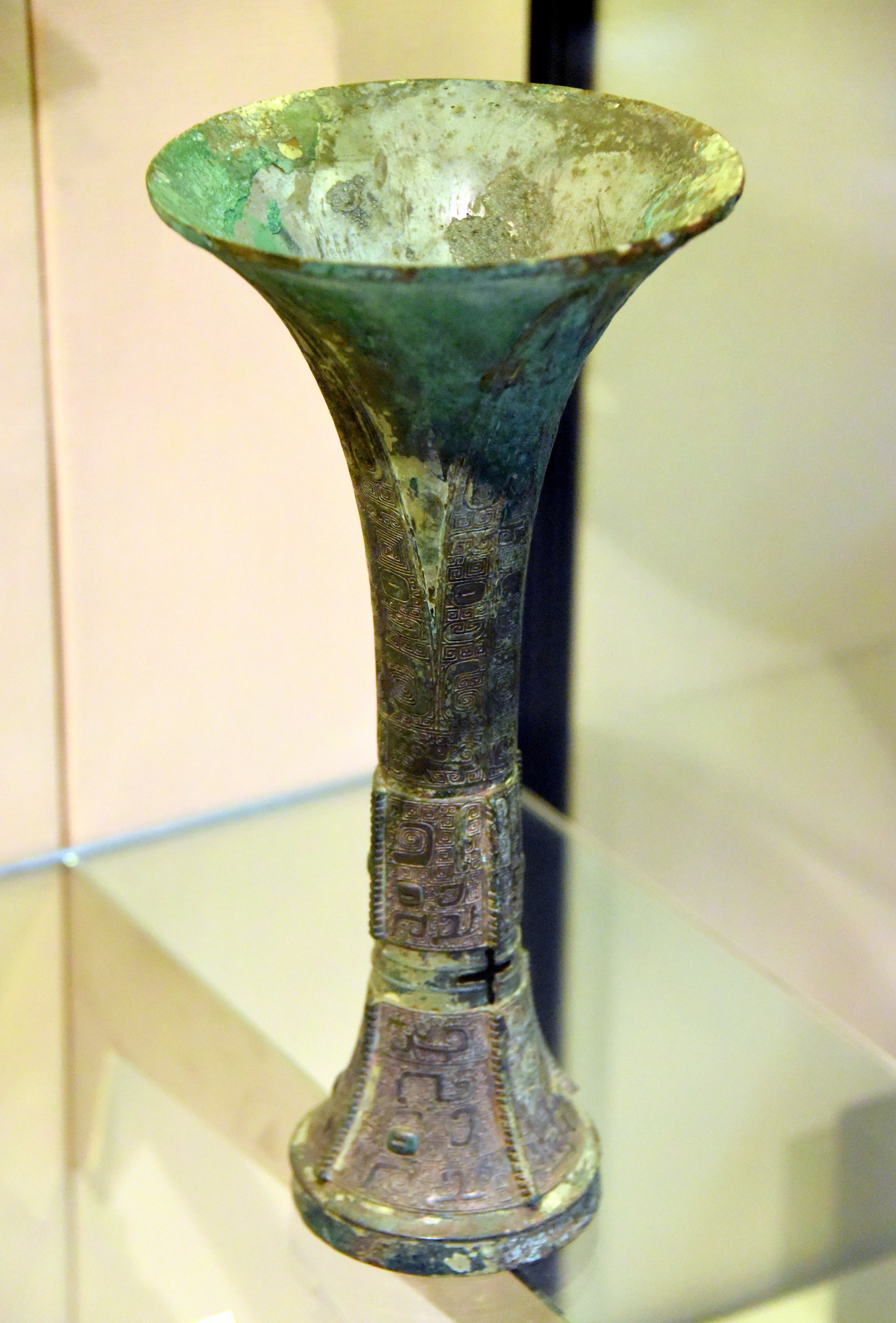
Goblet (Gu) with 2 bands of taotie motifs. Bronze. Shang dynasty, 1150-1050 BCE. From China, probably made in the capital Anyang. Victoria and Albert Museum

Huge changes had taken place before the capital of Shang moved to Yin, Shang's last capital. Gu also changed in Anyang phase. First, gu at this time was usually higher than 20 cm with slim body and a wide mouth. Fu Hao gu from Anyang is 25.5 cm high and its mouth is 14.2 cm wide, which significantly surpasses its bottom. Chü gu, also found from a tomb at Anyang, is about 31 cm high and its mouth is almost twice as wide as its bottom. Second, from this time onward, the base of gu raised up slightly with a short round foot. The gu displayed in the Arthur M. Sackler Gallery, Washington, D.C., and the Shanghai Museum, Shanghai, whose pictures are shown on this page, possess this feature. Third, some gu also have decors that extend from its waist to the rim of the mouth in three triangle registers. In fact, bronze vessels made in Anyang phase are usually fully decorated with decors.

==== Early Western Zhou dynasty ====
Imitations or revivals of former styles appear in the late Shang period and early Western Zhou period. Jessica Rawson has pointed out a gu that is 28.5 cm high with a taotie motif on its waist celebrates the early Shang styles by locating its decors on one band. Another example is the Lü Fu Yi gu found in the Hoard of the Wei Family. This vessel is 25.2 cm high and its mouth is about 13.2 cm wide. Its neck is long and slim without any decorations. Low ribbon-like relief appears at the lower section of the vessel and it does not have a foot.

==== Middle Western Zhou dynasty ====
In the middle Western Zhou period, gu became short and squat, while gradually disappeared. Wan Qi gu can be dated back to the mid–Western Zhou dynasty. This gu is about 14.5 cm high with a 14.7-cm-wide mouth and a 10.1-cm-wide base. Meanwhile, this gu's waist is only slightly narrower than its month and base. Another gu discovered in a hoard in Zhangjiapo, Shaanxi, is similar in shape, but a little bit smaller.

=== Ceramic gu ===
Modern Chinese archaeologists have identified numbers of neolithic pottery wine drinking vessels as gu or "gu-shaped vessel". However, ceramic gu continued to exist even after the bronze vessel was used.

==== The Neolithic Age ====
Numbers of pottery vessels unearthed from Neolithic sites are called gu by archaeologists. Some of these pottery gu look very different from the form of bronze gu, while some appear similar and might be the direct ancestors of bronze gu.

A gray pottery beaker discovered at a Dawenkou culture site in Tai'an, Shandong, is categorized as a "gu-shaped vessel". It is 29.2 cm high and can be roughly divided into 3 sections. The top section is a funnel shape container. Nonetheless, the other two sections distinguish this vessel form a bronze gu. The middle section is a long stem, decorated with engraved grooves and a high rising band. The lower section is its stand with three square legs.

Some pottery drinking vessels excavated in the late Dawenkou sites appear more similar to the bronze gu. A pottery gu that looks striking similar to bronze gu has been excavated at Shilipu (十里鋪), Henan. This gu is 13.6 cm high with four rising bands as decorations. Its body looks almost like a column, but gets wider at the mouth. Similar pottery objects have been found in other areas as well and these objects are suggested to be the predecessors of bronze gu.

==== The Bronze Age ====
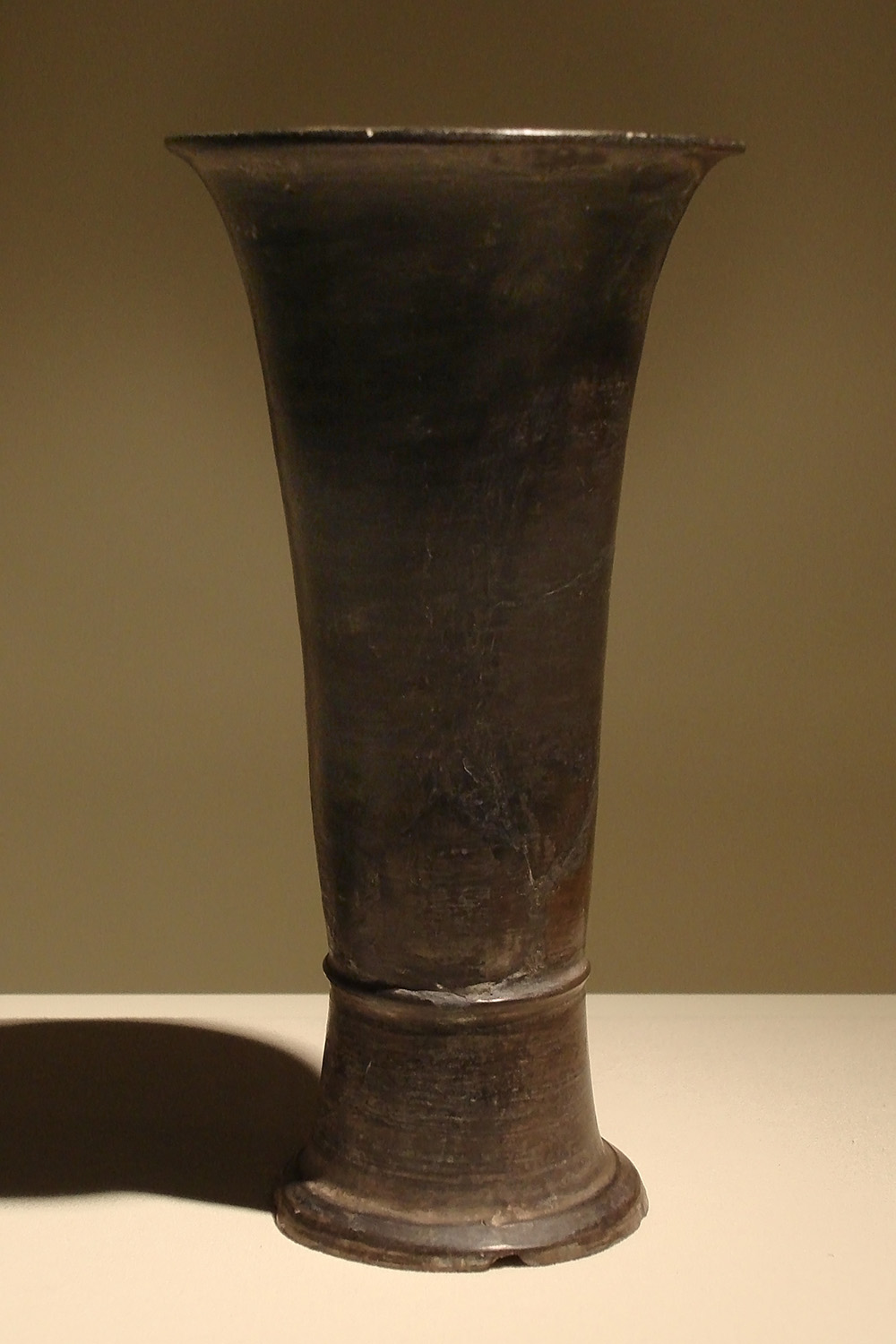
A pottery gu discovered in 1960 at the Erlitou sites

Pottery gu discovered from Erlitou and Erligang suggest they might have direct relation with the bronze gu. As mentioned above, pottery gu coexisted with bronze gu in the Bronze Age, but their shapes are not entirely identical.

Erlitou culture has been considered as a part of the Bronze Age, although scholars still have disputes in identifying it as the capital of the Xia dynasty, China's first dynasty recorded by historical texts, or an early Shang sites. A pottery gu discovered in Erlitou is a funnel-shape cup, which becomes narrow at the bottom. Meanwhile, it has a raised-up foot that gets wider at the bottom, which make its outlook similar to bronze gu.

Pottery gu are found in Anyang and some other Shang sites in the heyday of the Bronze Age. A pottery gu from a tomb that can be dated to the reign of Zugeng (祖庚) or Zu Jia (祖甲) in Anyang. The shape of this gu is very similar to bronze gu at the same period, though its waist is thicker. It have some long scratched slashes covered its surface as decor.

==== Later time period ====
Gu continues to exist after the Bronze Age, but it was used as vase instead of a wine drinking vessel. A gu with tubular handles, glazed in light greyish-blue in the National Palace Museum, for example, imitates the shape of bronze gu, but it functions as a vase.

=== Lacquered gu ===
Bianjiashan (卞家山) in Zhejiang has yielded numbers of lacquered vessels and gu is a major vessel type. These gu have slim waist and wide-opened mouth and they are coated with black and red lacquer with some rising bands as decorations. Archaeologists date Bianjiashan back to the late Liangzhu Culture period and suggest these gu may have certain connections with bronze gu in the Shang dynasty.

== Bibliography ==
=== Books ===
- Beijing Tushuguan 北京圖書館, ed. (1997). Beijing Tushuguan Cang Qingtong Qi Quanxing Tapian Ji 北京圖書館藏青銅器全形拓片集. Beijing: Beijing Tushuguan Chubanshe. ISBN 7501312850.
- Chang, Kwang-Chih (1980). Shang Civilization. New Heaven and London: Yale University Press.
- Fong, Wen, ed. (1980). The Great Bronze Age of China: An Exhibition from the People’s Republic of China. New York: Metropolitan Museum of Art.
- Guo li gu gong bo wu yuan 國立故宮博物院 (1989). 商周青銅酒器特展圖錄 [Catalogue of the Special Exhibition of Shang and Chou Dynasty Bronze Wine Vessels]. Taipei: Zhonghua min guo Taibei Shi Shilin qu Weishuangxi & Guo li gu gong bo wu yuan.
- The National Palace Museum (1962). Guan Ware of the Southern Song Dynasty. Hong Kong: Cafa.
- Loewe, Michael; Shaughnessy, Edward L., eds. (1986). The Cambridge History of Ancient China: From the Origins of Civilization to 221 B.C. Cambridge: Cambridge University Press.
- Lv 呂, Qichang琪昌 (2007). Qingtong Jue & Jia de Mimi: Cong Shiqian Taigui dao Xiashang Wenhua Qiyuan bing Duandai Wenti Yanjiu 青銅爵,斝的秘密：從史前陶鬶到夏商文化起源並斷代問題研究. Hangzhou: Zhejiang University Press. ISBN 9787308056113.
- Rawson, Jessica (1990). Western Zhou Ritual Bronzes from the Arthur M. Sackler Collections. Washington, D.C.: Sackler Foundation.
- Rawson, Jessica (1987). Chinese Bronzes: Art and Rituals. London: British Museum Publications.
- Rawson, J.; Bunker, E. (1990). Ancient Chinese and Ordos Bronzes. Oriental Ceramic Society of Hong Kong. ISBN 9789627496014.
- Thorp, Robert L. (1982). Spirit and Ritual: The Morse Collection of Ancient Chinese Art. New York: Metropolitan Museum of Art.
- Wu, Hung (1995). Monumentality in Early Chinese Art and Architecture. Stanford: Stanford University Press.
- Yang, Xiaoneng, ed. (1999). The Golden Age of Chinese Archaeology: Celebrated Discoveries from the People's Republic of China. Washington, D. C.: National Gallery of Art.
- Zhongguo Qingtong Qi Quanji Bianji Weiyuanhui 中國青銅器全集編輯委員會, ed. (1997). Zhouguo Qingtong Qi Quanji 中國青銅器全集. Vol. 2. Beijing: Wen wu chu ban she.

=== Articles ===
- Alt, Wayne (2005). "Ritual and the Social Construction of Sacred Artifacts: An Analysis of 'Analects' 6.25". Philosophy East and West. 55 (3). University of Hawaii Press: 461–469.
- Bagley, Robert (1986). "Shang Archaeology". In Loewe, Michael; Shaughnessy, Edward L. (eds.). The Cambridge History of Ancient China: From the Origins of Civilization to 221 B.C. Cambridge: Cambridge University Press. pp. 124–291.
- Bagley, Robert (1980). "The Zhengzhou Phase (The Erligang Period)". In Wen, Fong (ed.). The Great Bronze Age of China: An Exhibition from the People’s Republic of China. New York: Metropolitan Museum of Art.
- Chang, Kuang-Chih (1980). "The Chinese Bronze Age: A Modern Synthesis". In Wen, Fong (ed.). The Great Bronze Age of China: An Exhibition from the People’s Republic of China. New York: Metropolitan Museum of Art.
- Fong, Mary H. (1988). "The Origin of Chinese Representation of the Human Figure". Artibus Asiae. 49 (1–2): 5–38.
- Harrist, Robert E. (1995). "The Artist as Antiquarian: Li Gonglin and His Study of Early Chinese Art". Artibus Asiae. 55 (3–4): 237–280.
- Smith, Howard (1961). "Chinese Religion in the Shang Dynasty". Numen. 8. Brill: 142–150.
- Wang 王, Shouzhi 壽芝 (1988). "Shanxi Chenggu Chutu de Shangdai Qingtong Qi" 陝西城固出土的商代青銅器. Wenbo 文博. 6: 3–9.
- Zhao 趙, Ye 曄 (2006). "Tanmi Bianjiashan" 探秘卞家山. Dongfang Bowu 東方博物. 24: 38–45.
