= Juliana Young Koo =

Chinese-American diplomat (1905–2017)

- Born: Yen Yu-yun; September 26, 1905; Tianjin, China
- Died: May 24, 2017 (aged 111 years, 240 days); New York City, U.S.
- Resting place: Ferncliff Cemetery and Mausoleum
- Other name: Juliana Young Yen Koo
- Occupation: Diplomat
- Spouses: Clarence Kuangson Young (m. 1929; died 1942) Wellington Koo (m. 1959; died 1985)
- Children: 3, including Shirley Young

Chinese name
- Traditional Chinese: 嚴幼韻
- Simplified Chinese: 严幼韵
Transcriptions
Standard Mandarin
- Hanyu Pinyin: Yán Yòuyùn
- Wade–Giles: Yen2 Yu4-yün4

Juliana Young Koo, born Yen Yu-yun (Chinese: 嚴幼韻; September 26, 1905 – May 24, 2017), was a Chinese-American diplomat and supercentenarian who worked in the UN Protocol Department. Her first husband, Chinese diplomat Clarence Kuangson Young, was assassinated by Japanese imperial forces during World War II. She became the long-term mistress for the diplomat and politician V.K. Wellington Koo, long before her husband's death. After the war, she moved to the United States; in 1956 Koo divorced his wife and married her.

== Early life ==
Koo was born on September 26, 1905, into a wealthy family with business and government ties in Tianjin, China as Yen Yu-yün (or Yan Youyun). Her father Yan Zijun (1872–1931) and her grandfather Yan Xinhou (1838–1907) were both prominent businessmen, and her mother was a concubine, although she claimed her mother was her father's second wife; her father's first wife died in 1919, and there was no record that her mother became her father's wife. She attended Keen School at the same year.

She was one of the first women to graduate from Fudan University. At university, a special car took her to campus and brought her back, since its number was 84, the male students nicknamed her "Miss 84".

== Marriages and career ==
She married Clarence Kuangson Young Chinese: 楊光泩; pinyin: Yáng Guāngshēng; Wade–Giles: Yang Kuang-sheng) on September 6, 1929. In the 1930s, she became the mistress of Chinese diplomat V.K. Wellington Koo (Chinese: 顧維鈞). The scandal resulted in Young's being transferred to the Chinese consul general in Manila from 1939 to 1942. Young was arrested by the Japanese during World War II and executed on April 17, 1942, together with seven consulate staff. After the death of her husband, she took her three daughters to the U.S. and became Koo's mistress again. Per Koo's arrangement, she worked at the United Nations in New York. In 1956, Koo divorced his wife and married her in September 1959.

== Children ==
Koo had three daughters with Clarence Young: Genevieve, Shirley, and Frances.

Geneviene Young (1930–2020) was a book editor most known for Love Story by Erich Segal. She was married to Cedric Sun and Gordon Parks (from 1973 to 1979). Both marriages ended in divorce, but she and Parks remained close until Parks' death in 2006. She helped establish the Gordon Parks Foundation after Parks' death and continued to oversee the foundation and Parks' estate until her death in February 2020.

Shirley Young (1935–2020) was a prominent business executive for Grey Advertising and General Motors. She was married to George Hsieh and Norman Krandall. Both marriages ended in divorce. She died in December 2020 and was survived by three sons (all with Hsieh) and seven grandchildren.

Frances Young (1940–1992) was a philanthropist and preservationist. She was married to Oscar Tang (son of Tang Ping-yuan). In 2000, Tang gave $10.2 million for The Frances Young Tang Teaching Museum and Art Gallery at Frances' alma mater Skidmore College. A gallery at the Metropolitan Museum of Art is also named after her.

== Autobiography ==
She released her autobiography titled 109 Springtimes: My Story in 2015. On September 26, 2015, Koo became a supercentenarian, when she reached the age of 110 years.

According to her the secret to her longevity was eating foie gras, beef, pork belly and "as much butter as you like." She also advised against exercise and vegetables. She also suggested regular bouts of mahjong, a game she liked to play.

== Personal life ==
On May 24, 2017, more than 75 years after her first husband's execution, Koo died in Manhattan, New York City, New York. She was 111 years, 240 days old.
