= KOA =

Chain of campgrounds in the US and Canada

Kampgrounds of America
- Type: Private
- Industry: Amusement; Recreation
- Founded: 1962
- Founder: Dave Drum
- Headquarters: 1205 N Transtech Way, Billings, Montana, United States
- Area served: Worldwide
- Key people: Toby O'Rourke (CEO)
- Services: RV parks; Campgrounds
- Owner: Oscar Tang; Agnes Hsu-Tang
- Subsidiaries: Sir Speedy, Inc.
- Website: www.koa.com

KOA (short for Kampgrounds [sic] of America) is an American franchise of privately owned campgrounds. Having more than 500 locations across the United States and Canada, is the world's largest system of privately owned campgrounds. It was founded in 1962 and is based in Billings, Montana, United States. The current president and CEO of KOA is Toby O’Rourke.

== History ==
KOA was founded in 1962 in Billings, Montana, by businessmen Dave Drum, John Wallace and two other partners. Drum got the idea to start the campgrounds while walking his property along the Yellowstone River and seeing travelers heading to the Seattle World's Fair. The first campsites, known as Billings Campground, were located on Drum's property north of the Yellowstone River. For $1.75 per night, campers could pitch their tent on a campsite that included a picnic table and fire ring. This first campground also provided hot showers, restrooms, and a small store. The campground was quickly successful and by the summer of 1963, Drum, Wallace and their partners decided to create a system of campgrounds throughout North America. They named the company Kampgrounds of America and began selling franchises.

In 1969, KOA became a public company. By the end of the 1969 camping season, KOA had 262 campgrounds in operation across the U.S. By 1972, 10 years after KOA's creation, KOA had 600 franchise campgrounds.

The 1970s energy crisis caused the collapse of many travel-oriented businesses, and KOA's stock price sharply declined as fewer Americans drove for vacations. New York City financier Oscar Tang, a major stockholder at the time, purchased the company in its entirety after the 1979 oil crisis. However, by 1982 KOA franchises had increased to nearly 900. By 2002, after stricter quality standards weeded out many campgrounds, KOA campgrounds numbered almost 500, with most being in the United States.

KOA annually inspects each campground with a 600-point inspection, which it claims is the most stringent in the business.

In 2015, Jim Rogers stepped down as CEO after 15 years and was replaced by the president of the company, Pat Hittmeier. In April 2019, Hittmeier retired, and was replaced by new CEO Toby O'Rourke, the first woman to hold that position in the company's 57-year history.

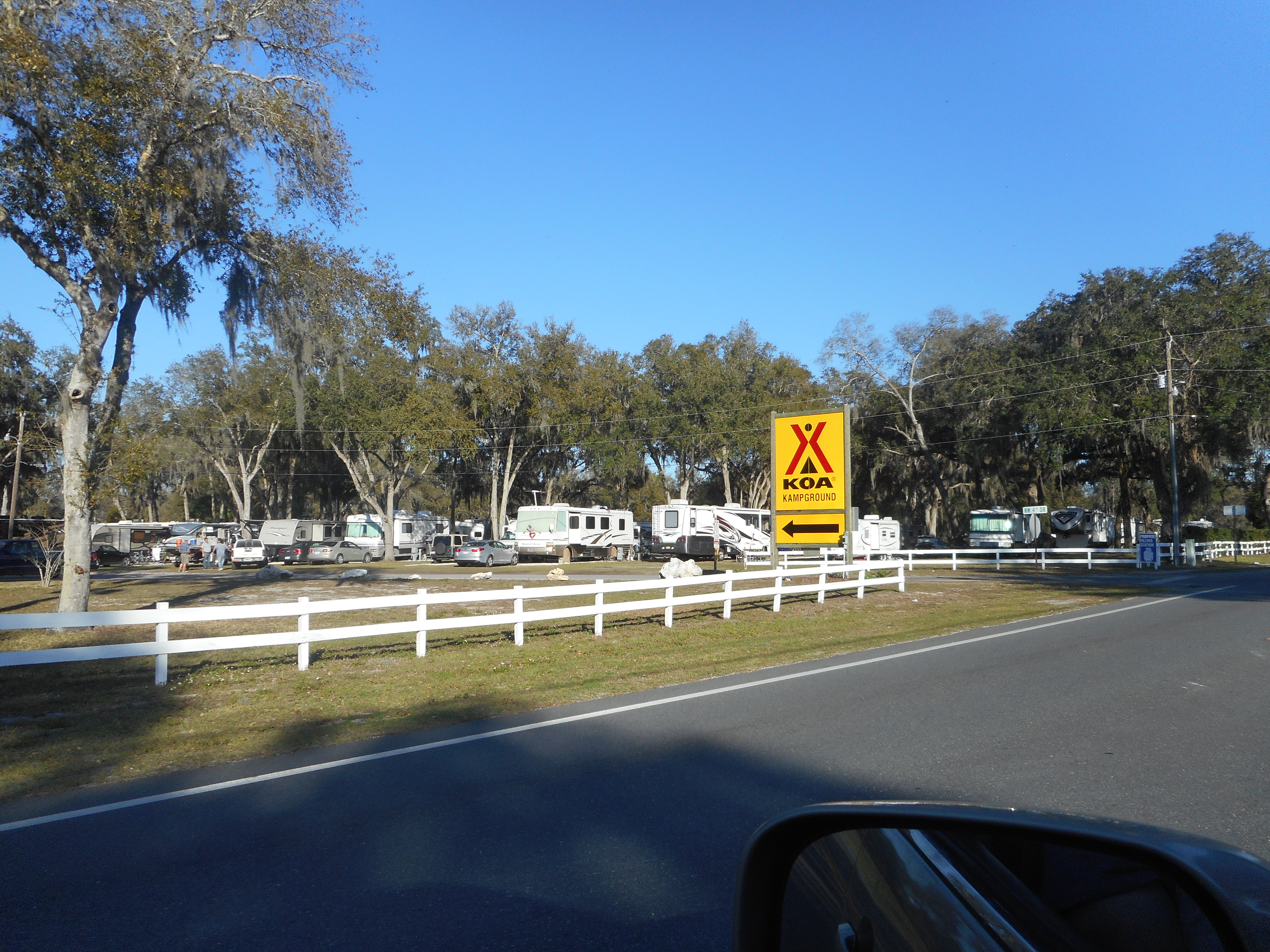
Entrance to Lake Panasoffkee, Florida KOA

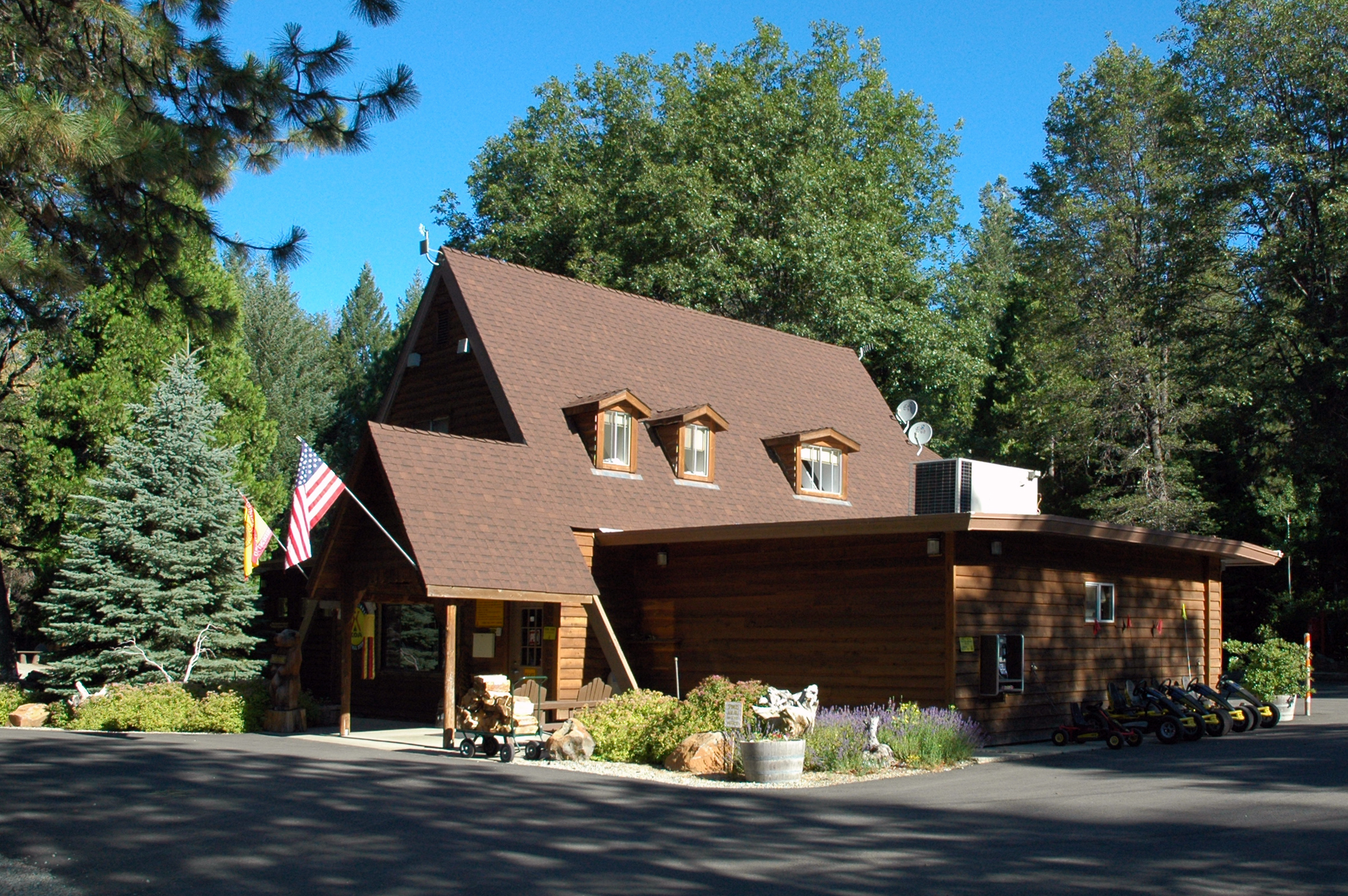
Reception of a KOA campground in Shingletown, California

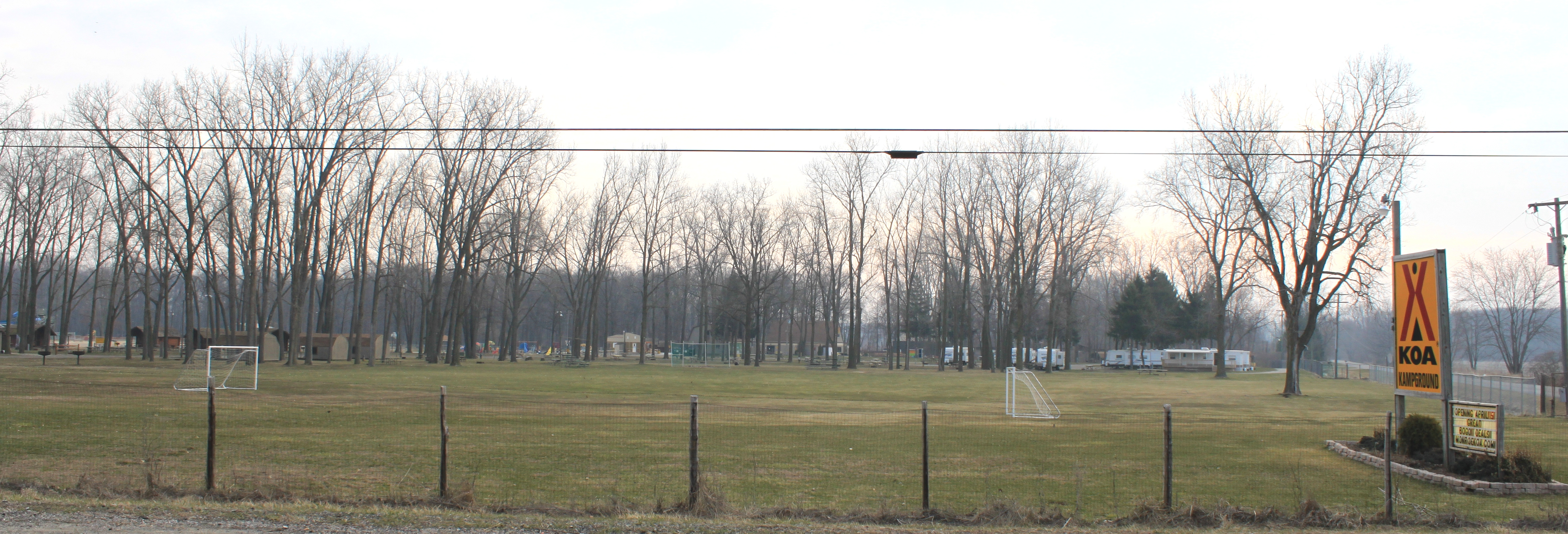
KOA campground, Petersburg, Michigan

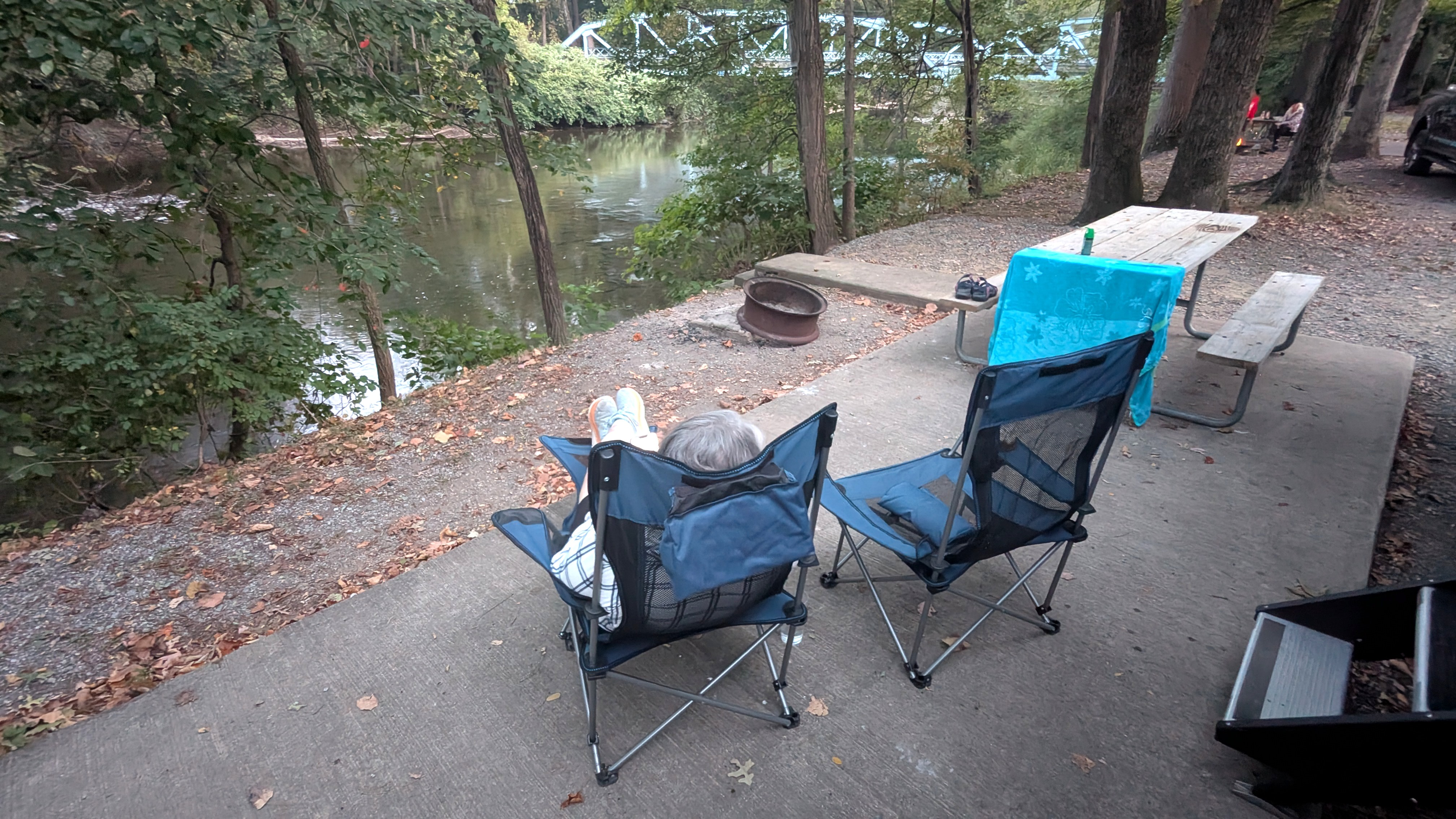
Creekside campsite at Jonestown/Hershey NE KOA Journey in Jonestown, Pennsylvania

== See also ==
- Membership campground
