= Oscar Tang =

American businessman

Oscar Liu-Chien Tang
- 唐騮千
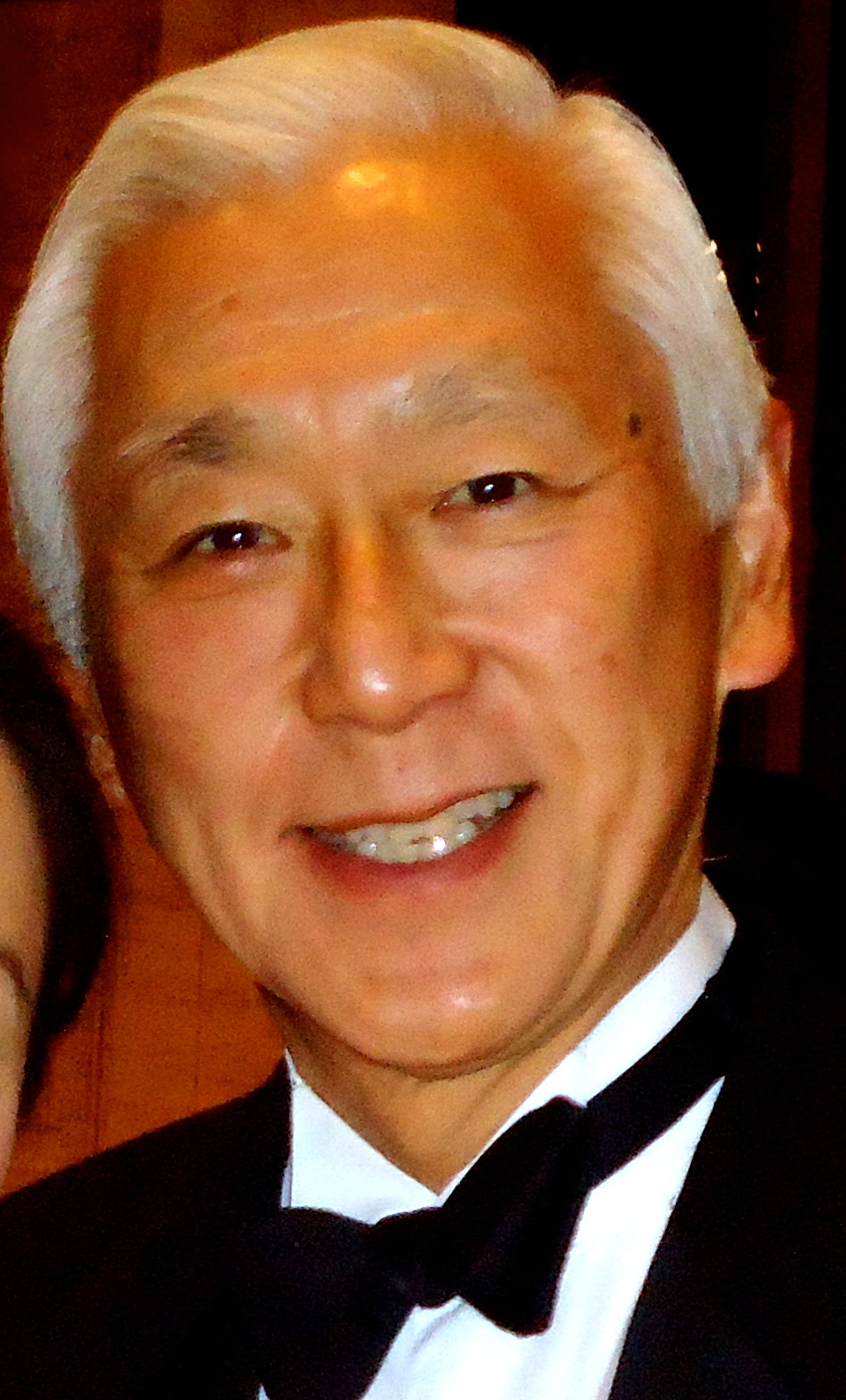
- Tang in 2013
- Born: 1938 (age 87–88); Shanghai, China
- Citizenship: China, United States
- Education: Yale University (BS); Harvard University (MBA)
- Occupations: Businessman, investor, philanthropist
- Title: Co-founded Reich & Tang
- Spouses: Frances Young (m. 1960; died 1992) Argie Ligeros (divorced) Agnes Hsu-Tang (m. 2013)
- Father: Tang Ping-yuan

Oscar Liu-Chien Tang (Chinese: 唐騮千; pinyin: Táng Liúqiān; born 1938) is a Chinese-born American businessman, financier, investor, and philanthropist. He is best known for being the co-founder of Reich & Tang, an asset management firm. Tang was elected a fellow of the American Academy of Arts and Sciences in 2005. Prior to this, he was appointed to the New York State Council on the Arts from 2000 to 2004 and the President's Committee on the Arts and Humanities from 1990 to 1993.

== Early life and education ==
Tang was born in Shanghai, China, and his family fled from the country when the Communist revolution took over in 1949. Tang attended Rectory School (’53) and Phillips Academy in Andover (’56). His future wife, Frances Young, attended Andover's sister school, Abbot Academy (’57), and she went on to Skidmore College (’61). Tang's lifelong dedication to Andover as the largest donor in the school's history and a champion for education was profiled in a 2012 documentary "An Andover Life".

Tang was educated at Yale University, where he was a member of Delta Kappa Epsilon and earned a Bachelor of Science (B.S.) degree. Tang then received an M.B.A degree from Harvard Business School in 1962.

== Business career ==
Tang began his career at Donaldson, Lufkin & Jenrette (DLJ). He became head of research.

In 1970, Tang co-founded Reich & Tang, an investment management firm, with Joseph Reich, another former head of research at DLJ. Originally covering equity accounts, Reich & Tang entered the money market mutual fund space in 1974 with the creation of the Daily Income Fund. Tang served as president and CEO for over 20 years. The firm merged with The New England Investment Companies in 1993.

Oscar Tang purchased Kampgrounds of America after the 1970s energy crisis battered the fortunes of travel-related companies, calling it "a very attractively priced asset." KOA is now owned by both Tang and his wife Agnes Hsu-Tang.

== Family and personal life ==
Tang's maternal grandfather was Wen Bingzhong (Chinese: 温秉忠; 1862–1938), one of the 120 young boys sent by the late Qing imperial court to study in America during the Chinese Education Mission. Tang's grandfather was the first Chinese person to be documented in the Northampton, MA census in 1880. After his return to China, Wen later served as a high-level foreign service official.

Tang's father was Tang Ping-yuan, a Boxer indemnity scholarship student at the Massachusetts Institute of Technology who became one of the early civic and business leaders of post-1949 Hong Kong; he was also a leading philanthropist in education. He was widely respected for his business success and as a civic leader. Tang Ping-yuan received many honors in his lifetime including Justice of the Peace and Order of the British Empire. He died in Hong Kong in 1971. Oscar Tang has talked about his family's roots in American education publicly and attributes his own experience and philanthropy to his family history.

In 1960, Tang married fellow Chinese-American Frances "Frankie" Young. Young was the daughter of Juliana Young Koo, sister of Shirley Young, and also a stepdaughter of the Chinese diplomat Wellington Koo. She graduated from Skidmore College in 1961. In later years, she was a philanthropist who specialized in landmark preservation. In 1992, she died at the age of 53 from cancer. A gallery at the Metropolitan Museum of Art is named after her, as is the Tang Art Museum at Skidmore College, her alma mater. They had four children, son Kevin and daughters Tracy Lynn, Dana, and Kristin. Tracy married Stephen Timothy Limpe, also Chinese-American through his mother Emily Ting Limpe, in 1990. Tracy now is a philanthropist and the chairman of the board at the Masters School in Dobbs Ferry, NY, her alma mater (’80, P’18). Dana Tang, an architect, married Andrew Haid Darrell, grandson of Norris Darrell, in 1998.

Tang's second marriage, to Argie Ligeros, a yoga instructor from Vail, Colorado, ended in divorce.

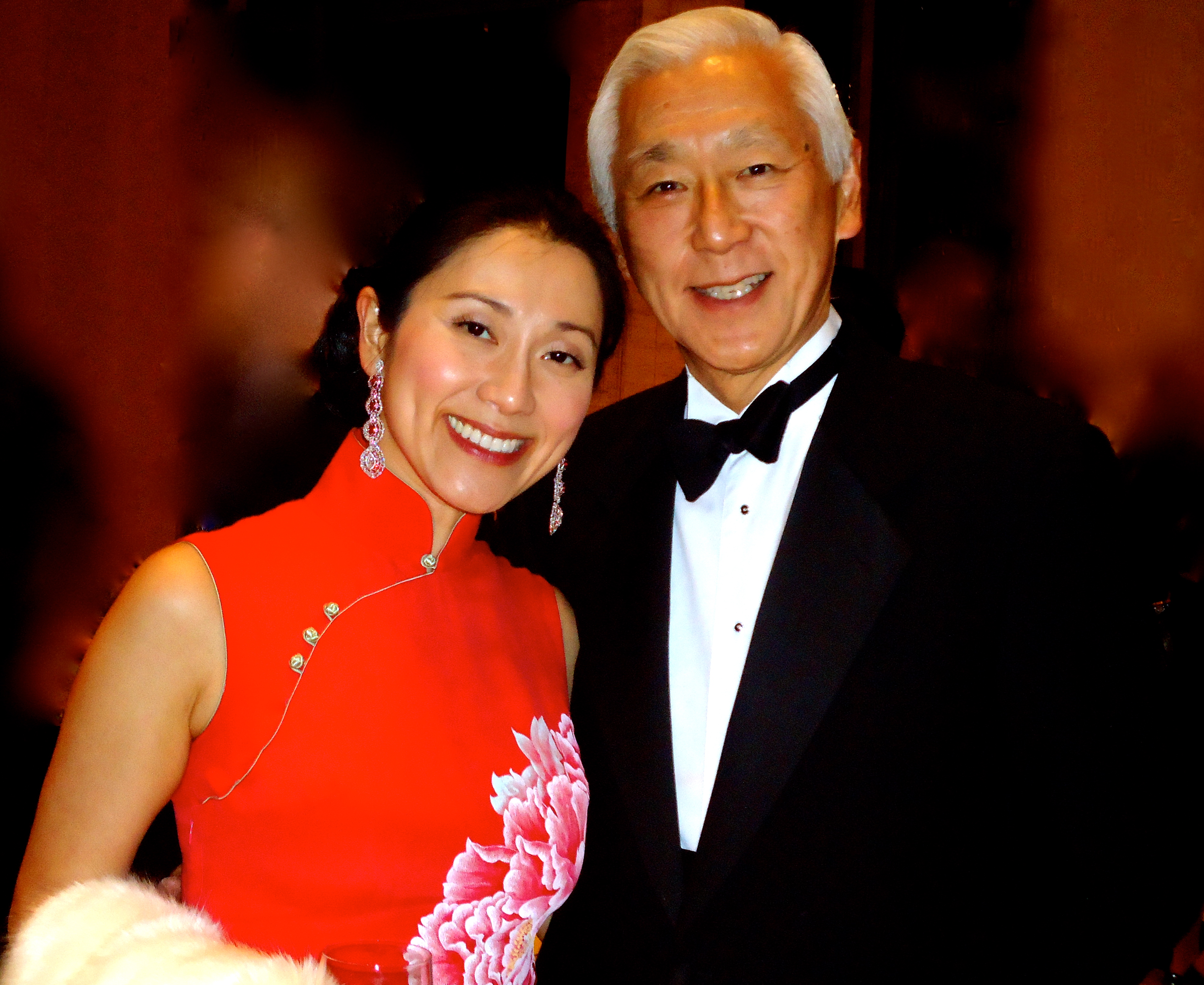
Oscar and Agnes Hsu-Tang in 2013

In 2013 Tang married Agnes Hsu-Tang (née Hsin-Mei Hsu), a Penn-, Cambridge-, and Stanford-educated archaeologist and UNESCO advisor on the faculty at Columbia University. Hsu has been dubbed by the Chinese press as "China's Lara Croft" for her hosting of the award-winning documentary series Mysteries of China. Chinese and Singaporean press has widely reported that Hsu is a descendant of the Ming dynasty Catholic imperial minister Xu Guangqi who was beatified by the Vatican on April 15, 2011 and regarded by many to be the founder of modern Shanghai. Xujiahui ("the District of the Xu/Hsu Clan") is the historical center of Catholic Shanghai. Hsu's maternal great-grandfather was Ji Xiaolan, the Qianlong Emperor's imperial minister of war and poet laureate.

Tang's brother was Jack Chi-chien Tang (唐驥千), a Hong Kong business leader, educator, philanthropist and one of the founders of the Asia Society Hong Kong Center in 1990. Jack died in 2014.

Tang's brother-in-law was Princeton University professor, Wen Fong, who was attributed to have "helped to create and shape the academic field of East Asian art history as we know it today."

Tang resides in New York City and Vail, Colorado with his wife. Tang was honored as Vail Valley's Citizen of the Year in 2004.

Town and Country featured Tang and his family as one of the fifty most influential families in media, art, and culture in its 2018 T&C50 issue.

== Philanthropy and advocacy ==
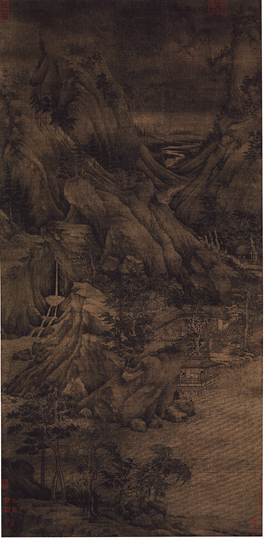
This 962 A.D. painting by Chinese artist Dong Yuan is one of the earliest landscapes which created the illusion of depth and distance on a silk canvas. Tang bought it for New York's Metropolitan Museum in 1997.

According to published data, Tang has given away $200–250 million as of 2010. Among other recognitions for his philanthropy, Tang is an honoree of the Carnegie Corporation's "Great Immigrants: The Pride of America." Tang is known to be a significant donor to institutions such as the Metropolitan Museum of Art, the New York Philharmonic, Yale University, Skidmore College, the Vail Valley Foundation, the Gordon Parks Foundation, and other organizations. Tang has also contributed to other institutions including the Tang Center for Early China at Columbia University, the Princeton University's P.Y. and Kinmay W. Tang Center for East Asian Art, the Tang Center at MIT, Duke University, University of California, Berkeley, Cornell University, and Harvard University. In 2008, he gave $25 million to Phillips Academy in what was the school's largest ever single contribution. In 2014, he donated an additional $15 million to Andover to establish the Tang Institute at Andover. At the Rectory School in Pomfret, Connecticut, Tang donated the P.Y and Kinmay Tang Performing Arts Center and has created the Tang Family Endowment for Excellence in Teaching with $5 million.

In June 2016, Tang was honored by the Metropolitan Museum with its Business Committee Civic Leadership Award for his service and contribution as a longtime trustee and philanthropist.

After the Tiananmen Square Massacre in 1989, Tang worked with other high-profile Chinese-Americans to found the Committee of 100, including Yo-yo Ma and I.M. Pei, to "encourage rapport and understanding between two countries."

=== Phillips Academy and the Tang Institute at Andover ===
In 2008, Tang gave $25 million to Phillips Academy. It was the largest single donation in the school's 230-year history. The gift was used to support "need-blind admission" allowing smart students from less affluent families to attend the elite boarding school, according to headmaster Barbara Landis Chase. As of 2008, Tang has contributed close to $41 million to Phillips Academy, helping boost the school's endowment over $800 million. Before being installed as the President of the Phillips Academy Board of Trustees, he was a charter trustee since 1995 and a major school volunteer for over two decades. He was instrumental in preserving the buildings and campus of the former Abbot Academy, which merged with Phillips Academy, when there had been discussion about razing the no-longer-used structures; Tang's philanthropy gave funds for preservation of these buildings.

In October 2014, Tang gave an additional $15 million to establish the Tang Institute at Andover. "A physical and virtual hub for entrepreneurial exploration, the Tang Institute at Andover supports community ideas for innovative approaches to teaching and learning. Focused on the Andover experience and advances in secondary education more broadly, the Institute encourages experimentation, interdisciplinary collaboration, new partnerships, connected learning, and ongoing assessment. By harnessing the intellectual curiosity and creativity of faculty and students—both in and out of the classroom—the Tang Institute seeks to have a lasting impact on campus and beyond."

=== Metropolitan Museum of Art ===
Tang is a member of the board of the Metropolitan Museum of Art in New York. He gave $14 million in 1997 to enable the museum to purchase rare and valuable Chinese paintings, most notably what is commonly known as the Riverbank by Dong Yuan. His gift included 11 major paintings from the C.C. Wang collection and additional funding toward Chinese art galleries. A gallery is named after Tang's late wife, Frances Young Tang.

In March 2015, Tang, the first Chinese-American trustee of the Metropolitan Museum of Art for more than 20 years and a leading patron of its Chinese collection, gave an additional $15 million to create new curatorial and conservation staff appointments and programming to the Museum's Asian Centennial.

Tang received the Met Museum's Civic Leadership Award in June 2016.

In November 2021, The Metropolitan Museum of Art in New York City announced that Chinese-American Oscar Tang and Agnes Hsu-Tang have pledged $125 million to fund the renovation of the Modern and Contemporary Wing at The Met – the largest ever capital gift to the Museum. In honor of their generosity, The Met will be renaming the M&C Wing to the Oscar L. Tang and H.M. Agnes Hsu-Tang Wing.

=== New York Philharmonic ===
Oscar L. Tang was elected to be the next co-chairman of the New York Philharmonic, with Peter W. May, on April 3, 2019. Both Peter May and Oscar Tang currently serve on the Board of Directors, and have supported Philharmonic projects including co-chairing Opening, Lunar New Year, and Spring Galas. Tang and his wife have chaired the orchestra's popular Lunar New Year Concert and Gala since its inception in 2011. The New York Philharmonic is one of the American orchestras commonly referred to as the "Big Five" and the oldest American symphonic institution. The Philharmonic's home is David Geffen Hall, located in New York's Lincoln Center.

On September 12, 2023, the New York Philharmonic announced that the organization has received a gift of 40 millions, the largest endowment contribution in its history, from Co-chairman Oscar Tang and his wife, Agnes Hsu-Tang. The gift is designated to endow the Philharmonic's music and artistic director chair starting in the 2025–26 season, when Gustavo Dudamel, the 42-year-old leader of the Los Angeles Philharmonic and the superstar maestro, becomes music director designate.

=== The P.Y. and Kinmay W. Tang Center for East Asian Art at Princeton University ===
Tang funded the P.Y. and Kinmay W. Tang Center for East Asian Art in honor of his parents.

=== The P.Y. and Kinmay W. Tang Center for Silk Road Studies at the University of California, Berkeley ===
Tang and his wife, and his nieces and nephew—Nadine Tang, Leslie Schilling, and Martin Tang—provided an endowment gift to Berkeley to establish the P.Y. and Kinmay W. Tang Center.

=== The Frances Young Tang Teaching Museum and Art Gallery at Skidmore College ===
Tang gave $10.2 million for the Tang Teaching Museum and Art Gallery at Skidmore College in 2000. The purpose of the Frances Young Tang Teaching Museum and Art Gallery is to awaken the community to the richness and diversity of the human experience through the medium of art. Every year the Museum has a designated day in honor of its namesake and alumna, Frances Young Tang, called Frances Day.

=== Chinese American: Exclusion/Inclusion Exhibition at the New-York historical Society ===
In September 2014, the New-York Historical Society opened "Chinese American: Exclusion/Inclusion", with support of the Tang family. The New-York Historical Society later donated this exhibition to the Chinese Historical Society of America in San Francisco, where it is now on permanent display.

== See also ==
- Chinese people in New York City
