= Chihung Yang =

Taiwanese-American painter

Yang Chihung
- Born: 25 October 1947 (age 78); Chungli, Taiwan
- Education: Taiwan Arts Vocational College
- Known for: Painting, Abstract art

This is a Chinese name; the family name is Yang

Yang Chihung (Chinese: 楊識宏; pinyin: Yang Chihung; born 25 October 1947) is a Taiwanese-American artist.

== Early life and education ==
Yang Chihung was born on 25 October 1947, in Chungli, Taiwan. He developed an interest in art in early childhood, and found inspirations to pursue an artist career after reading Lust for Life – The Life of Vincent van Gogh, translated by poet Yu Kuang-chung, in junior high school. Between 1965 and 1968, he attended then National Taiwan College of Art, developing a sound foundation in oil painting under the tutelage of famous Taiwanese artists of the Japanese Colonial period, such as Liao Chi-chun, Li Mei-shu and Yang San-lang. Meanwhile, he actively attended events organized by the modern art groups of Taiwan, namely the Fifth Moon Group and Ton Fan Group, only to find himself both intimidated and dissatisfied with the then relatively conservative art environment in Taiwan. In 1979, he emigrated to the United States of America with his wife, Jane, and their son, Daniel. In 1984–85 and again in 1985–86, he was twice awarded a year's residency at The Clocktower Studio in New York City by MoMA P.S.1.

== Career ==
In 2013, Yang, along with Xu Bing, Zhang Huan, and Li Chen, were the four artists featured in the Discovery Channel Asia documentary series, Chineseness, a multi-series production that focused on postwar Chinese contemporary artists.

== Awards and recognition ==
- 1989, Outstanding Asian American Artist Award, by Governor of New York
- 1984–1986, MoMA P.S.1 National Studio Program, Residency at Clocktower Studio, New York

== Solo exhibitions ==
- 2019 Majestic Momentum – Yang Chihung, Guangdong Museum of Art, Guangzhou, China
- 2017–2018 The Sensibilities of Black and White – Yang Chihung's Recent Works from the Stream of Consciousness Series, Asia Arts Center Beijing, Beijing, China
- 2015 Eternal Present – Recent Paintings by Yang Chihung, Ueno Royal Museum, Tokyo, Japan
- 2014 Faces of Contemporary Intelligentsia, New Taipei City Art Center, Tamsui Historical Museum, Taipei, Taiwan
- 2014 The Poetics of Polyphony: Yang Chihung Solo Exhibition, Asia Art Center, Taipei, Taiwan
- 2011–2012 Beyond Painting – Chihung Yang's Genes of Creativity, Kaohsiung Museum of Fine Arts, Kaohsiung, Taiwan
- 2010 Chihung Yang 40 Years of Painting, National Taiwan Museum of Fine Arts, Taichung, Taiwan
- 2009 Chihung Yang: Sculpting In Time, Chung Shan National Gallery, National Dr. Sun Yat-sen Memorial Hall, Taipei, Taiwan
- 2008 Yang Chihung Recent Paintings, ChinaSquare Gallery, New York City
- 2007 Inner Vision．Human Condition, National Art Museum of China, Beijing, China
- 2004 The Images of the Mind, National Museum of History, Taipei, Taiwan
- 2003 Sejong Center Museum of Fine Art, Seoul, Korea
- 1987 Chihung Yang: Paintings and Works on Paper 1986–1987, Galería Nacional de Arte Contemporáneo, Museo de Arte Costarricense, San José, Costa Rica

== Publications ==
- Yang Chihung The Sensibilities of Black and White – the Stream of Consciousness Series, Asia Art Center, 2018, ISBN 9789869566414
- Eternal Present: Recent Paintings by Yang Chihung, Asia Art Center, 2016, ISBN 9789868633285
- Yang Chihung 1967–2014, Asia Art Center, 2014, ISBN 9789868633261
- Chihung Yang: 40 Years of Painting, National Taiwan Museum of Fine Arts, 2010, ISBN 9789860253429
- Inner Vision．Human Condition: Chihung Yang Solo Exhibition in National Art Museum of China, Asia Art Center, 2007, ISBN 9789579780476
- The Images of the Mind: Chihung Yang’s Painting, National Museum of History, 2004, ISBN 9789570182132
- New Trends in Modern Art, Artist Magazine, 1987
