= T. Gary Rogers =

- Born: June 5, 1942; Stockton, California
- Died: May 2, 2017 (aged 74); Oakland, California
- Education: Harvard Business School; University of California, Berkeley
- Known for: Former Owner and CEO of Dreyer's

Thomas Gary Rogers (June 5, 1942 – May 2, 2017) was an American entrepreneur and executive who acquired and built Dreyer's Grand Ice Cream into a major company. Rogers was formerly a director of Levi Strauss & Co. and he served as the first non-family Chairman of their board in 155 years.

Rogers was born in Stockton, California. He attended Harvard Business School with Bob Haas who preceded him as Chairman of Levi Strauss. Rogers retired from the Levi's Board of Directors on December 3, 2009. He became chairman of the board of directors of the Federal Reserve Bank of San Francisco for a term beginning January 1, 2009. He was also the chairman of Safeway Inc.

Rogers purchased Dreyer's Grand Ice Cream with his business partner, Rick Cronk, for $1 million in 1977. He was the CEO and he and Cronk were managers and principal shareholders of Dreyer's for almost 30 years, until the company was acquired by Nestlé in 2006 for $3.2 billion.

Rogers is an Eagle Scout and recipient of the Distinguished Eagle Scout Award from the Boy Scouts of America. He is the brother of James D. Rogers, who is also an Eagle Scout and Distinguished Eagle Scout. Their brother Don is also an Eagle Scout, as are seven of their sons, for a total of ten Eagle Scouts across two generations of this family.

Rogers is an alumnus of the University of California, Berkeley. He has been a substantial financial contributor to the university, particularly the rowing program. He recently gave a donation to build the new boathouse complex, which is now named in his honor.

His various donations were made through the Rogers Family Foundation.

He died in May, 2017.

== See also ==
- List of Eagle Scouts (Boy Scouts of America)
