= James D. Rogers =

- Born: 1949 (age 76–77)
- Known for: Former CEO of Kampgrounds of America

James D. "Jim" Rogers (born 1949) is the former president and CEO of Kampgrounds of America (KOA).

== Career ==
Rogers first job at KOA started in 1972 as a management trainee. He stayed for nearly three years before heading to UCLA to complete a master's degree in business administration. After a couple of years as general manager of a South Lake Tahoe resort, he went to work for Harrah's Entertainment Inc. in 1978, eventually becoming senior vice president and general manager of Harrah's Reno in 1994. Then, in January 2000, he returned to KOA as president and chief executive officer.

In 2013, Rogers was on season four of Undercover Boss and went undercover as CEO of Kampgrounds of America.

== Scouting ==
Rogers became an Eagle Scout in Greenbrae, California in 1965 and a recipient of the Distinguished Eagle Scout Award from the Nevada Area Council of the Boy Scouts of America in Reno, Nevada in 2002. Rogers received the BSA's highest national volunteer award, The Silver Buffalo, in May, 2016. Scouting's values play an important role in this entire family. He has a wife, Sandy, and three sons: Ben, Judd, and Tyler; all three are Eagle Scouts. Rogers is the brother of T. Gary Rogers, who is also an Eagle Scout and Distinguished Eagle Scout. Their brother Don is also an Eagle Scout; as are seven of the family's sons, for a total of 10 Eagle Scouts across two generations of this family.

Rogers is a member of the National Executive Board of the Boy Scouts of America, the organization's governing body.
