= Norris Darrell =

American lawyer (1899–1989)

- Born: 1899
- Died: 1989 (aged 89–90)
- Education: University of Minnesota Law School (LL.B., 1923)
- Occupation: Attorney
- Employer(s): Sullivan & Cromwell
- Known for: President of the American Law Institute (1961–1976)
- Spouses: Doris Clare Williams; Mary Deshon Hand Churchill (daughter of Learned Hand)
- Children: 2, including Norris W. Darrell Jr. and Richard Darrell
- Relatives: Trevor Darrell (grandson), Oscar Tang (in-law via grandson)

Norris de Mouilpied Darrell, Jr. (1899–1989) was an American attorney. Norris graduated with LLB from the University of Minnesota Law School in 1923 and clerked for Supreme Court Justice Pierce Butler from 1923 to 1925. He joined the New York law firm Sullivan & Cromwell in 1925, where he was partner for 42 years, and served as president of the American Law Institute for 15 years from 1961 to 1976. He was the son-in law of Judge Learned Hand through his second marriage to Mary Deshon Hand Churchill. He had two sons through his first marriage to Doris Clare Williams, Norris W. Darrell Jr., also a Sullivan & Cromwell partner, and Richard Darrell. His grandson Trevor Darrell through Richard is a computer-vision researcher. Another grandson Andrew through Norris Jr. is the son-in-law of Oscar Tang.

== See also ==
- List of law clerks for the tenth seat of the Supreme Court of the United States
