= Wen Fong =

Chinese-American historian of East Asian art

- 方聞
- Born: 1930; Shanghai, China
- Died: October 3, 2018 (aged 88); Princeton, New Jersey, U.S.
- Education: Shanghai Jiao Tong University; Princeton University (BA, MFA, PhD)
- Known for: Chinese art history
- Spouse: Constance Tang Fong
- Children: 3
- Scientific career
- Fields: Art history
- Workplaces: Princeton University; Metropolitan Museum of Art

Chinese name
- Traditional Chinese: 方聞
- Simplified Chinese: 方闻
Transcriptions
Standard Mandarin
- Hanyu Pinyin: Fāng Wén
- Wade–Giles: Fang Wen
- IPA: [fáŋ wə̌n]
Wu
- Romanization: Faan^{1} Men^{3}

Wen C. Fong (Chinese: 方聞; pinyin: Fāng Wén; 1930 – October 3, 2018) was a Chinese-American historian of East Asian art. He was the Edwards S. Sanford Professor of Art History at Princeton University, where he taught Chinese art history for 45 years. In 1959 he co-founded the first doctoral program in Chinese art and archaeology in the United States, which was later expanded to include Japan. He served as chairman of Princeton's Department of Art and Archaeology, and as consultative chairman for Asian art at the Metropolitan Museum of Art in New York City.

== Early life and education ==
Fong was born in Shanghai in 1930. As a child he studied under the calligrapher Li Jian (李健; 1881–1956). Fong held his personal calligraphy exhibition at the age of 10 and was acclaimed as a prodigy. He enrolled at Shanghai Jiao Tong University before moving to the United States to study at Princeton University in 1948.

At Princeton Fong studied under Kurt Weitzmann and George Rowley, and earned his B.A. in European history and M.F.A. in medieval art history. In 1954, he joined the faculty of Princeton while still studying for his Ph.D., which he received in 1958. His Ph.D. dissertation on the history of Chinese art was published by the Freer Gallery of Art as The Lohans and a Bridge to Heaven (1958).

== Career ==
In 1959, Wen Fong and Frederick W. Mote co-founded the first doctoral program in Chinese art and archaeology in the United States, which was expanded to include Japan in 1962. From 1970 to 1973, he served as Chair of Princeton's Department of Art and Archaeology. He was a curator at the Art Museum of Princeton University for Asian art, and helped build the John B. Elliott Collection of Chinese Calligraphy, considered one of the best outside of China. In 1971, he was named Edwards S. Sanford Professor of Art History. He retired from Princeton in 1999, after a 45-year career. He subsequently taught at Tsinghua University from 2004 to 2007 and Zhejiang University from 2009 to 2012.

From 1971 to 2000, Fong also served as a special consultant, and later consultative chairman, for Asian art at the Metropolitan Museum of Art. At the Met, he had an influential debate with art historian James Cahill over the authenticity of The Riverbank, a famous 10th-century painting attributed to the Southern Tang master Dong Yuan. It was purchased and donated to the museum by the financier Oscar Tang, Fong's brother-in-law. Cahill made an explosive argument that the painting was a fake created by the 20th-century master painter and forger Zhang Daqian, while Fong disagreed with his finding. The dispute remains unresolved. Despite their disagreement, Cahill made a presentation praising Fong's scholarship and friendship at a 2006 Princeton symposium held in Fong's honor.

Fong also served as Corresponding Research Fellow at the Institute of History and Philology of Academia Sinica in Taiwan and was elected as an academician of Academia Sinica in 1992. He was also elected to the American Philosophical Society that same year.

Legacy The Wen C. and Constance Fong Library，a specialized art and archaeology library at the Zhejiang University Museum of Art and Archaeology is named in his honour. It was Wen Fong who suggested creating China's first teaching museum focused on undergraduate art history at Zhejiang University.

== Personal life ==
In the 1950s, Fong married Constance Tang Fong (Chinese: 唐志明), whom he had met at the Museum of Fine Arts, Boston. They had three children: Laurence, Peter, and Serena.

On October 3, 2018, Fong died in Princeton, New Jersey, of leukemia, aged 88.

== Selected publications ==
- Streams and Mountains without End: A Northern Sung Handscroll and Its Significance in the History of Early Chinese Painting, co-authored with Sherman E. Lee (Artibus Asiae, 1955; 2nd edition, 1967).
- The Lohans and a Bridge to Heaven (Freer Gallery of Art, 1958).
- Summer Mountains: The Timeless Landscape (Metropolitan Museum of Art, 1975).
- Returning Home: Tao-chi’s Album of Landscapes and Flowers (George Braziller, 1976).
- The Great Bronze Age of China: An Exhibition from the People’s Republic of China, editor (Metropolitan Museum of Art, 1980).
- Images of the Mind: Selections from the Edward L. Elliot Family and John B. Elliot Collections of Chinese Calligraphy and Painting at the Art Museum, Princeton University (Princeton University Art Museum, 1984).
- Beyond Representation: Chinese Painting and Calligraphy, 8th–14th Century (Metropolitan Museum of Art and Yale University Press, 1992).
- Possessing the Past: Treasures from the National Palace Museum, Taipei (Metropolitan Museum of Art and H. N. Abrams, 1996).
- The Embodied Image: Chinese Calligraphy from the John B. Elliot Collection, co-authored with Robert E. Harrist, Jr., et al. (Princeton University Art Museum, and H. N. Abrams, 1999).
- Along the Riverbank: Chinese Paintings from the C. C. Wang Family Collection (Metropolitan Museum of Art, 1999).
- Between Two Cultures: Late-Nineteenth- and Twentieth-Century Chinese Paintings from the Robert H. Ellsworth Collection in the Metropolitan Museum of Art (Metropolitan Museum of Art and Yale University Press, 2001).
