= Shirley Young =

American businesswoman (1935–2020)

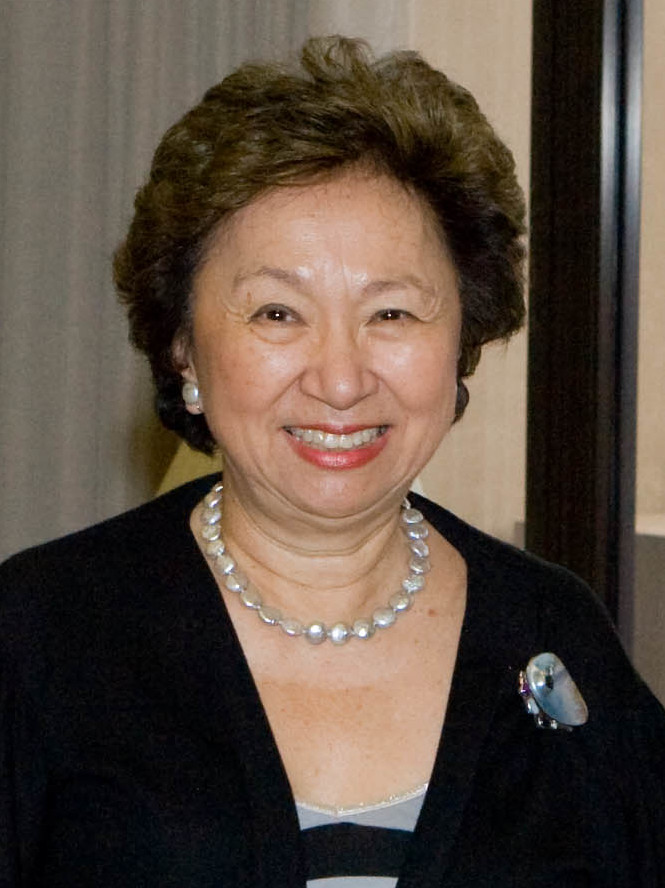
Young in 2008

Shirley Young (simplified Chinese: 杨雪兰; traditional Chinese: 楊雪蘭; pinyin: Yáng Xuělán; May 25, 1935 – December 26, 2020) was an American businesswoman. She was an executive at Grey Advertising and later at General Motors (GM). She was also a cultural ambassador between the United States and China.

== Biography ==
Young was born in Shanghai. She was the daughter of Clarence Young, a Chinese diplomat, and Juliana Young Koo, who was the long-term mistress for the diplomat and politician V.K. Wellington Koo, while her father was still living.

Young received a BA in economics, Phi Beta Kappa, from Wellesley College in 1955 and attended graduate school at New York University from 1956 to 1957.

== Career ==
She started at Grey Advertising in 1959 where she led an internal market research division until 1988; she was among the only women and Asian-American employees at the firm at the time. In 1963, when Young was pregnant with her first child, she forced Grey to rethink their maternity leave policies as she didn't leave the company or take the severance package they offered. She was the president of Grey Strategic Marketing, a research subsidiary of Grey as of 1983. In 1988 she was hired by General Motors. GM had been a client of Young's at Grey Advertising since at least 1985. At GM, Young led an initiative to help the firm regain market share, as its reputation was suffering in the early 1990s.

Young left GM in 2000 to found her own consulting firm, Shirley Young Associates, which advised US companies interested in Chinese opportunities.

Young helped to found the Committee of 100 and served as a chair of the organization, and used classical music to bridge divides between the United States and China.

== Personal life ==
Young was married to George Hsieh. They had three sons, David, William and Douglas. They divorced and Young married Norman Krandall. That marriage also ended in divorce.

== Publications ==
- Young, Shirley; Feigin, Barbara (July 1975). "Using the Benefit Chain for Improved Strategy Formulation". Journal of Marketing. 39 (3): 72–74. doi:10.1177/002224297503900315. ISSN 0022-2429. S2CID 167465132.
- Young, Shirley; Ott, Leland; Feigin, Barbara (August 1978). "Some Practical Considerations in Market Segmentation". Journal of Marketing Research. 15 (3): 405–412. doi:10.1177/002224377801500311. ISSN 0022-2437. S2CID 167305485.
