= Tang Ping-yuan =

Hong Kong entrepreneur and politician

Unofficial Member of the Executive Council of Hong Kong
- In office 1968–1971

Unofficial Member of the Legislative Council of Hong Kong
- In office 1964–1968

Personal details
- Born: 8 September 1898 Qing dynasty Wuxi, Jiangsu
- Died: 17 June 1971 (aged 72) Hong Kong Sanatorium & Hospital, Happy Valley, Wan Chai, British of Hong Kong
- Spouse: Wan Kin May
- Relations: Henry Tang; Tang Hsiang-chien
- Children: Jack Tang (1927–2014); Victor Tang (1931–1997); Oscar Tang (1938-)
- Parent: Tang Baoqian (1866–1937)
- Education: St. John's University, Shanghai; Tsinghua University; Massachusetts Institute of Technology (BS)
- Occupation: Founder of South China Textile Manufacturing Company Limited

Tang Ping-yuan, CBE, JP (Chinese: 唐炳源; 8 September 1898 – 17 June 1971) was a Hong Kong entrepreneur and politician. He was the founder of the South Sea Textiles and the unofficial member of the Executive Council and the Legislative Council.

== Early life and education ==
Tang was born to a prominent textile merchant family in 1898 in Wuxi, Jiangsu, China. His father, Tang Baoqian, owned the Qingfeng Textile Factory, one of the seven leading textile corporations in Wuxi. He was educated at the St. John's University, Shanghai and Tsinghua University in Beijing before he received a scholarship from the Chinese government to go abroad to study at the Massachusetts Institute of Technology. In 1923, after receiving a Bachelor of Science in engineering from MIT, he returned to China to assist his father's textile and flour businesses.

== Business and public career ==
Tang moved to Hong Kong in 1947 and established his own company, the South Sea Textiles in Tsuen Wan in the following year. The company went on to become one of the leading manufacturing company in the colony. He also sat on the board of many companies including the Hong Kong Telephone Company and the Television Broadcasts Limited.

Tang was made Justice of the Peace in 1964. In July 1964, he was appointed unofficial member of the Legislative Council of Hong Kong. In June 1968, he was appointed by Governor David Trench to the Executive Council, succeeding resigning Li Fook-shu. He was known for calling for improving industrial relations and the working conditions. For his public services, he was awarded Officer of the Order of the British Empire in 1967 and Commander of the Order of the British Empire in 1968. He also received 3rd class Order of the Sacred Treasure in 1971 for his efforts in improving Hong Kong-Japan relations.

== Philanthropist works ==
He had donated 30 million Hong Kong dollars to build the University Library of the Chinese University of Hong Kong built in 1972. He was also the co-founder of the Community Chest of Hong Kong and its first president. He was also member of the Council of the University of Hong Kong, the Chinese University of Hong Kong and chairman of the Council of the New Asia College. For his contributions to the Chinese University, he received an honorary doctor of laws degree in 1968.

Tang was also the first chairman of the steering committee of the Hong Kong Polytechnic when the college was about to be promoted from the Hong Kong Technical College. In 2002, the Hong Kong Polytechnic University named a building after Tang Ping-yan and his wife Kinmay W.Tang for their contributions to the university. In 2012, the Hong Kong Polytechnic University named a square in its campus after Tang.

== Death ==
Tang died at the Hong Kong Sanatorium and Hospital on 17 June 1971. His son, Jack Chi-chien Tang, was the former chairman of the Hong Kong General Chamber of Commerce in 1984. Ping Yuan Tang Residence Hall in the Massachusetts Institute of Technology was decorated by Jack Tang in 1973 in honour of his father.
