= American LGBTQ+ Museum =

Proposed museum in New York City, New York

Coordinates: 40.779°N 73.974°W

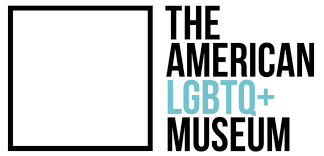
The American LGBTQ+ Museum Logo

The American LGBTQ+ Museum is a museum in development on the Upper West Side of Manhattan that will focus on New York City's LGBTQ history. It will be part of the campus of the New-York Historical Society, which is undergoing a 70,000 square feet (6,500 m^{2}) expansion, and was slated to open in 2026, but the opening has since been moved to the spring of 2028. Under the leadership of Richard Burns, the museum's board chair, planning for a museum began in 2017. Ben Garcia was named the museum's first executive director in January 2022 and Suhaly Bautista-Carolina joined as the museum's director of programs and partnerships in 2023. Trustees of the museum include Michael Kors, Imara Jones, Leti Gomez, and Erik Stegman. The museum has partnered with, and will occupy the top floor of, the New York Historical museum.

In November 2023, the museum opened Queer Justice: 50 Years of Lambda Legal, their first traveling exhibit at The Center. The exhibit subsequently traveled the country.
