= Li Chen (artist) =

Sculptor from Taiwan

Li Chen 李真
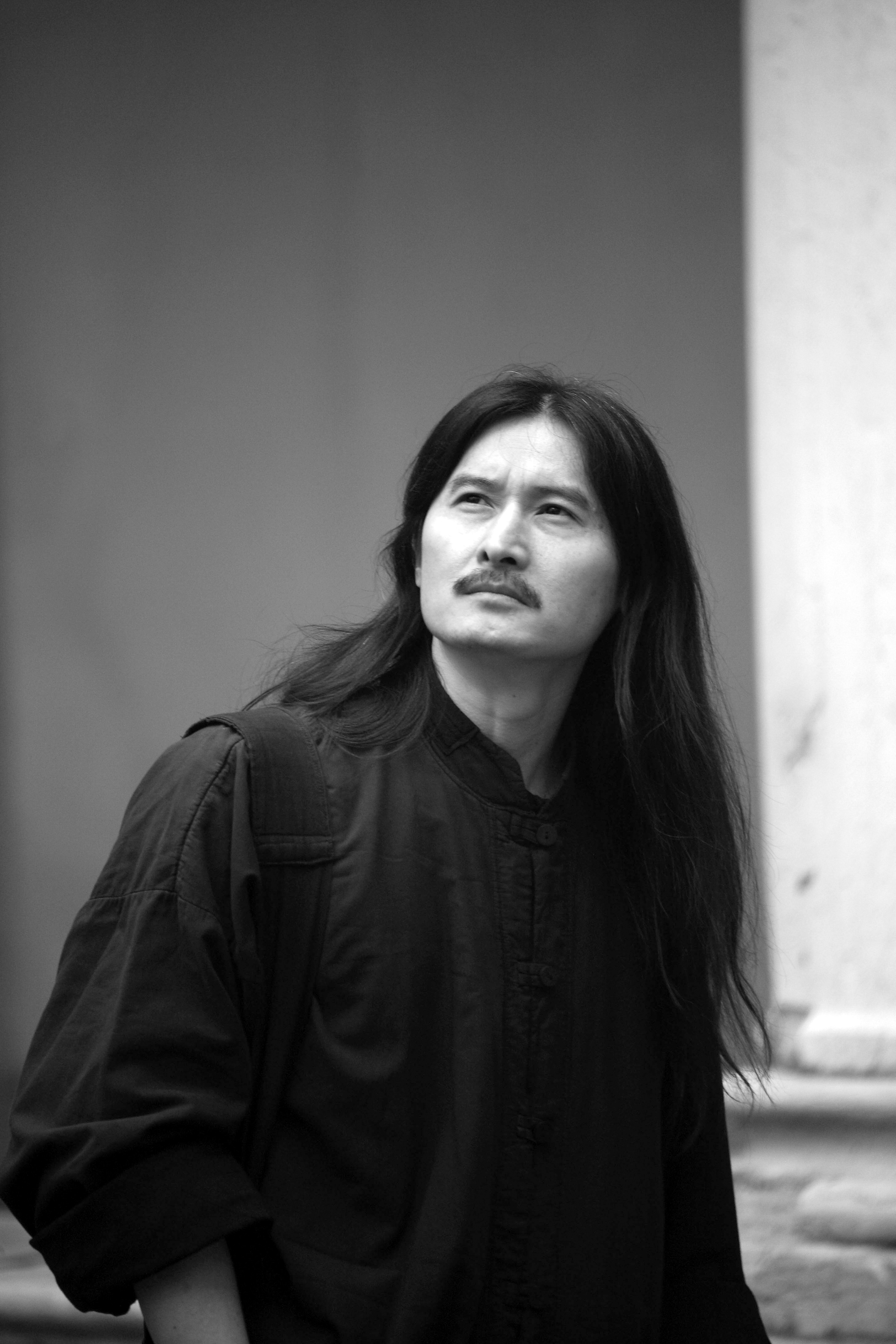
- Born: 16 April 1963 (age 63); Yunlin, Taiwan
- Education: Taichung Municipal Dajia Senior High School
- Known for: sculpture, painting

Li Chen or Li Zhen (Chinese: 李真; pinyin: Lǐ Zhēn; Wade–Giles: Li Chen) is a sculptor. He was born in 1963 in Yunlin County, Taiwan.

== Early life and education ==
Li attended Taichung Municipal Dajia Senior High School. Before joining Taiwan's mandatory military service, Li took up a position in the workshop of local sculptor Hsieh Tung-liang where he studied body sculpture.

== Career ==
Two of Li's early art series The Beauty of Emptiness and Energy of Emptiness use simple minimalist lines that create an aesthetic of emptiness to reinterpreted the image of Buddha statues. In the Spiritual Journey Through the Great Ether series, Li is less limited by tradition, inventing a technique that incorporates gold and silver leaf on the exterior of his bronze sculptures.

Soul Guardians was inspired by Li's reflections on the occurrence of natural disasters over almost a decade. He takes the main character of a myth as his creative focus as he discusses the significance of "God" for humanity. This was followed by The Beacon: When Night Light Glimmers series, which took a "special light" as its creative core.

More recently, Li has reflected on human nature in his creative works: the Ordinary People series in 2010 demonstrates his spiritual contemplation. The 2011 series Immortality of Fate, which is one of Li's "virtual" series, utilizes wood, rope and ceramic clay to convey his awareness of the changeability of cause and effect in life. In the same year, Li also produced the Ethereal Cloud series, the first time he showed cast stainless steel pieces.

Li's auction record is HKD.11,190,000 for a sculpture "Dragon-Riding Buddha" created in 2001, set at China Guardian, Hong Kong, on 7 October 2019.

=== Series ===
- The Beauty of Emptiness (1992–1997)
- Energy of Emptiness (1998–2000)
- Spiritual Journey Through the Great Ether (2001–)
- Soul Guardians (2008–2009)
- Immortality (2008–)
- The Beacon (2009–2010)
- Ordinary People (2010–)
- Ethereal Cloud (2011–)

=== Exhibitions ===
==== Solo exhibitions ====
- 2019 Ethereal Cloud – Li Chen New Works, Asia Art Center, Beijing, China
- 2018 Through the Ages - Li Chen Solo Exhibition, Aurora Museum, Shanghai, China
- 2017 Being: In/Voluntary Drift - Li Chen Solo Exhibition, Museum of Contemporary Art, Taipei, Taiwan
- 2014-15 Journey of Solitary Existence: Li Chen's "Ordinary People" Series Debut Exhibition, Asia Art Center, Beijing, China
- 2013–14 Discovery Channel's documentary "Chineseness", Taipei, Taiwan
- 2013 Li Chen 2013 Place Vendôme Premiere Sculpture Exhibition in Paris
- 2012 Li Chen: Eternity and Commoner, Frye Art Museum, Seattle
- 2011 Greatness of Spirit: Li Chen Premiere Sculpture Exhibition in Taiwan, Taipei
- 2010 The Beacon– When Night Light Glimmers, ShContemporary 10, Shanghai
- 2009 Li Chen: Mind‧Body‧Spirit, Singapore Art Museum, Singapore
- 2008 Soul Guardians- Li Chen Solo Show, Asia Art Center, Beijing

In Search of Spiritual Space, National Museum of China, Beijing

- 2007 Energy of Emptiness, 52nd International Art Exhibition – La Biennale di Venezia, Venice
- 2005 Li Chen Sculpture, Art Taipei 2005, Taipei
- 2003 Spiritual Journey Through the Great Ether, Michael Goedhuis Gallery, New York
- 2001 Delights of Ordinary People, River Art Gallery, Taichung
- 2000 The Transformation of Emptiness – Boundary within Boundary, Art Taipei 2000, Taipei
- 1999 Energy of Emptiness, Art Taipei, Taipei

==== Selected international group exhibitions ====
- 2019 Buddha．China-Buddhist Objects in the Early Stage from the Gansu Provincial Museum, Suzhou, China
- 2015 Rest on Water and Gargle with Stone: Chinese Contemporary Literati Art, Beijing, China
- 2013 Culture. Mind. Becoming, 55th International Art Exhibition La Biennale di Venezia, Italy
- 2011 Splendid Ethics, Interalia Art Company, Seoul
- 2010 Spirit of the East II – Bridging, Asia Art Center, Beijing

Korea International Art Fair, Seoul, Korea

- 2009 The 4th International Cultural & Creative Industry Expo, Beijing

09, Hong Kong

- 2008 Spirit of the East I- Accumulations, Asia Art Center, Beijing

The Origin: The first Annual Moon River Sculpture Festival, Moon River Museum of Contemporary Art, Beijing

- 2007 China Onward: Chinese Contemporary Art 1966–2006, The Louisiana Museum of Modern Art, Copenhagen

OPENASIA, 10th International Exhibition of Sculptures and Installations, Venice
The Power of the Universe – Exhibition of Frontier, Contemporary Chinese Art, Asia Art Center, Beijing
Exploration and Revolution of images in reality by the 14 contemporary Chinese Artists, Doosan Art Center, Seoul
TOP 10 Chinese Contemporary Sculpture Exhibition, Asia Art Center, Beijing
China Onward: Chinese Contemporary Art, 1966–2006, Israel Museum, Jerusalem

- 2006 ARTSingapore, Singapore

Art Taipei, Taipei

- 2005 Shanghai International Biennial Urban Sculpture Exhibition, Shanghai

China International Gallery Exposition, Beijing
Shanghai Art Fair, Shanghai
ARTSingapore, Singapore

- 2004 OPENASIA, 7th International Exhibition of Sculptures and Installations, Venice

Fiction Love– Ultra New Vision in Contemporary Art, Museum of Contemporary Art, Taipei
China International Gallery Exposition, Beijing
Shanghai Art Fair, Shanghai

- 2003 Art Chicago, Chicago

International Contemporary Art Fair, New York

- 2002 Art Palm Beach, Florida

Art Chicago, Chicago
International Fine Art Fair, Houston

- 2001 China without Borders, headquarters of Sotheby's, New York

Asian Art Fair, Paris
Salon de Mars Art Fair, Geneva, Switzerland
Art Chicago, Chicago
The International Asian Art Fair, New York

== Publications ==
- Through the Ages-Li Chen, Aurora Museum and Asia Art Center, 2019, ISBN 9789869566438
- Being: In/Voluntary Drift - Li Chen Solo Exhibition, MOCA Taipei, 2018, ISBN 9789869651806
- La Légèreté Monumentale de Li Chen, Asia Art Center, 2014, ISBN 9789868633254
- Greatness of Spirit: Li Chen Premiere Sculpture Exhibition in Taiwan, Asia Art Center, 2012, ISBN 9789868633223
- Li Chen: The Beacon Series: When Night Light Glimmers, Asia Art Center, 2010, ISBN 9789868633216
- Li Chen: Mind．Body．Spirit, Singapore Art Museum & Asia Art Center, 2009, ISBN 9789868406087
- Li Chen: Soul Guardians-In an Age of Disasters and Calamities, Asia Art Center, 2009, ISBN 9789868406070
- Li Chen in Beijing – Solo Exhibition at National Art Museum of China – In Search of Spiritual Space, Asia Art Center, 2008, ISBN 9789868406018
- Li Chen in Venice, Asia Art Center, 2007, ISBN 9789579780469
- Li Chen 1992–2002 Sculpture, Asia Art Center, 2004, ISBN 9579780447
