= List of World War II feature films since 1990 =

Below is an incomplete list of fictional feature films or miniseries released since 1990 which feature events of World War II in the narrative.

== Restrictions ==
- The film or miniseries must be concerned with World War II (or the Sino-Japanese War) and include events that feature as a part of the war effort.
- For short films, see the List of World War II short films.
- For documentaries, see the List of World War II documentary films and the List of Allied propaganda films of World War II.

Fictional feature films specifically pertaining to the Holocaust appear in the List of Holocaust films#Narrative films.

== Common topics ==
Many aspects of this conflict have repeatedly been the subject of drama. These common subjects will not be linked when they appear in the film descriptions below:

Europe

- Adolf Hitler, Nazis and Nazism
- Nazi Germany and the Third Reich
- Wehrmacht, Luftwaffe, Kriegsmarine, Gestapo and Waffen-SS
- Benito Mussolini
- Kingdom of Italy
- Royal Italian Army, Regia Marina, Regia Aeronautica and Blackshirts
- Death camps, Nazi concentration camps, earlier concentration camps
- Partition and occupation of Poland and Polish resistance
- Occupied France, Vichy France and French Resistance
- Occupied Norway
- The Holocaust

Asia–Pacific

- Emperor Hirohito
- Empire of Japan
- Imperial Japanese Army and Imperial Japanese Navy
- Little Boy and Fat Man

Non-geographical

- POW

== 1990s ==
=== 1990–1994 ===
| Year | Country | Main title (Alternative titles) | Original title (Original script) | Director | Battles, campaigns, events depicted |
|---|---|---|---|---|---|
| 1990 | Soviet Union | Unknown Pages from the Life of a Scout | Неизвестные страницы из жизни разведчика | Vladimir Chebotaryov | Drama, War. |
| 1990 | Soviet Union | Ladies Tailor | Дамский портной | Leonid Gorovets | Drama. Babi Yar |
| 1990 | Soviet Union | It's us, God! | Это мы, Господи! | Aleksandr Itygilov | War. Kremlin cadet, Battle of Moscow |
| 1990 | Soviet Union | Ukrainian vendetta | Украинская вендетта Українська вендетта | Vladimir Krajnev | Drama, War. |
| 1990 | Soviet Union | Sand-Pit | Карьер | Nikolai Skujbin | Drama, War. |
| 1990 | Soviet Union | Klim Voroshilov-2 Tank | Танк «Клим Ворошилов-2» | Igor Sheshukov | Drama, War. Kliment Voroshilov tank |
| 1990 | Soviet Union | War in the Western Front | Война на западном направлении | Grigoriy Kokhan; Timofei Levchuk | War. |
| 1990 | Hong Kong; Taiwan | Red Dust | | Ho Yim | A female novelist falls in love with a Chinese traitor working with the Japanese during World War II |
| 1990 | Canada; France; China | Bethune: The Making of a Hero | | Phillip Borsos | Drama. Montreal doctor Norman Bethune in the Spanish Civil War, then his death aiding Mao Zedong's army |
| 1990 | Australia | Blood Oath | | Stephen Wallace | War-crimes trial of Japanese for Laha massacre |
| 1990 | France | Dr. Petiot | Docteur Petiot | Christian de Chalonge | Crime drama. Serial killer Marcel Petiot in occupied France |
| 1990 | West Germany; France; Poland | Europa Europa | Hitlerjunge Salomon (in German) | Agnieszka Holland | Jewish boy conceals identity by joining Hitler Youth |
| 1990 | Sweden; Hungary; Norway | Good Evening, Mr. Wallenberg | God afton, Herr Wallenberg – En Passionshistoria från verkligheten (in Swedish) | Kjell Grede | Drama. Biography of Swedish diplomat Raoul Wallenberg in Hungarian Holocaust |
| 1990 | United States | Hiroshima: Out of the Ashes (TV) | | Peter Werner | Hiroshima after Enola Gay drops atomic bomb |
| 1990 | Poland; West Germany; United Kingdom | Korczak | Korczak | Andrzej Wajda | Drama. Biography of Dr. Korczak in Warsaw Ghetto |
| 1990 | United States | A Man Called Sarge | | Stuart Gillard | Comedy. Western Desert Campaign, battles of El Alamein and Tobruk |
| 1990 | United Kingdom; United States | Memphis Belle | | Michael Caton-Jones | Crew of US B-17 bomber Memphis Belle on their 25th mission, 1943 |
| 1990 | West Germany | The Nasty Girl | Das schreckliche Mädchen | Michael Verhoeven | Comedy-drama based on Anna Rosmus. Young woman's research into her German village's history during Third Reich |
| 1990 | United States | Spymaker: The Secret Life of Ian Fleming | | Ferdinand Fairfax | Biographical film of the life of Ian Fleming, creator of James Bond |
| 1991 | France, Poland, United Kingdom | 30 Door Key | Ferdyruke | Jerzy Skolimowski | Drama. Aerial bombing of Warsaw during the Invasion of Poland |
| 1991 | Soviet Union | No bells rang for us when we died | Нам дзвони не грали, коли ми вмирали | Mykola Fedyuk | Drama. |
| 1991 | Soviet Union | Carpathian Gold | Карпатське золото Карпатское золото | Viktor Zhivolub | Drama. |
| 1991 | Sweden; Norway; Denmark; Finland | The Boys from St. Petri | Drengene fra Sankt Petri (in Danish) | Søren Kragh-Jacobsen | Students form Danish Resistance group Churchill Club under German occupation of Denmark |
| 1991 | Latvia | The Child of Man | Cilvēka bērns | Jānis Streičs | Adventure romance based on Jānis Klīdzējs' novel. Latgalian boy's attempts to prevent young woman from marrying shortly before Soviet and Nazi occupations |
| 1991 | Spain; Denmark; Sweden; France; Germany; Switzerland | Europa (Zentropa) | Europa | Lars von Trier | American with German railway job at end of war finds his position politically sensitive |
| 1991 | United States | For the Boys | | Mark Rydell | Musical comedy-drama. USO performer entertains US troops from World War II to Vietnam War |
| 1991 | Poland | Just Beyond This Forest | Jeszcze tylko ten las | Jan Łomnicki | Holocaust |
| 1991 | Japan | Kayoko's Diary | Ushiro no shoumen daare (うしろの正面だあれ) | Seiji Arihara | Anime. Japanese home front and bombing of Tokyo of 10 March 1945 |
| 1991 | Italy | Mediterraneo | Mediterraneo | Gabriele Salvatores | Comedy-drama. Italian soldiers occupying Greek island |
| 1991 | Sweden; Denmark | The Naked Trees | De nøgne træer | Morten Henriksen | Based on Tage Skou-Hansen novel. Danish Resistance under German occupation of Denmark |
| 1991 | Canada | The Quarrel | | Eli Cohen | Holocaust survivors and estranged friends resume argument from years earlier |
| 1991 | Japan | Rhapsody in August | Hachi-gatsu no kyōshikyoku (Hachigatsu no rapusodī) (八月の狂詩曲) | Akira Kurosawa | Nagasaki family after Bockscar drops atomic bomb |
| 1991 | France; Germany; Poland | Warsaw – Year 5703 | Warszawa. Année 5703 (in French); Tragarz puchu (in Polish); Der Daunenträger (in German) | Janusz Kijowski | Romantic drama about a couple fleeing the fall of the Warsaw Ghetto |
| 1992 | Ukraine | Cherry nights | Вишневі ночі | Arkadi Mikulsky | Drama. |
| 1992 | Russia | In the fog | У тумане В тумане | Sergey Linkov | |
| 1992 | Russia | The General | Генерал | Igor Nikolaev | Drama, War. Alexander Gorbatov |
| 1992 | Poland | All That Really Matters | Wszystko, co najważniejsze | Robert Gliński | Lwów, Poland under Soviet occupation then Gulag |
| 1992 | Denmark; United States | A Day in October | En dag i oktober | Kenneth Madsen | Danish-Jewish relocation from German-occupied Denmark to neutral Sweden |
| 1992 | United States | A Midnight Clear (Section 44) | | Keith Gordon | A US intelligence unit finds a German platoon wishing to surrender near the end of the war |
| 1992 | Poland | Ring with a Crowned Eagle | Pierścionek z orłem w koronie | Andrzej Wajda | Polish Resistance, 1945–46 |
| 1992 | United States | Shining Through | | David Seltzer | Romance/Thriller. Irish-Jewish-German woman recruited as OSS agent in Nazi Germany |
| 1993 | France; Switzerland | East Wind | Vent d'est | Robert Enrico | Drama. Boris Smyslovsky, First Russian National Army |
| 1993 | Russia; France; Syria | Angels of Death | Ангелы смерти | Yuri Ozerov | Drama, War. Battle of Stalingrad |
| 1993 | Canada | For the Moment | | Aaron Kim Johnston | Romance between an Allied bomber pilot stationed in Canada and a lonely married woman whose husband is fighting overseas |
| 1993 | Norway | The Last Lieutenant (The Second Lieutenant) | Secondløitnanten | Hans Petter Moland | Retired Norwegian sea-captain volunteers for duty after Operation Weserübung and coordinates volunteers against German occupation of Norway |
| 1993 | Romania | The Mirror | Oglinda (Începutul adevarului) | Sergiu Nicolaescu | Downfall of Ion Antonescu |
| 1993 | Taiwan | The Puppetmaster | Xi meng ren sheng (戲夢人生) | Hou Hsiao-hsien | Japanese occupation of Taiwan (1937–1945) |
| 1993 | Japan | Rail of the Star | O-Hoshisama no Rail (お星さまのレール) | Toshio Hirata | Anime. Japanese family in Korea during World War 2 |
| 1993 | United States | The Remains of the Day | | James Ivory | Lavish meetings between German sympathizers and English aristocrats in an effort to influence international affairs in the years leading up to the Second World War |
| 1993 | United States | Schindler's List | | Steven Spielberg | 1993 Best Picture drama chronicling Oskar Schindler's rescue of nearly 1,200 Jews in occupied Poland from the Holocaust |
| 1993 | Germany | Stalingrad | Stalingrad | Joseph Vilsmaier | Battle of Stalingrad |
| 1993 | United States | Swing Kids | | Thomas Carter | Musical drama. High school Swing Kids in the Hitler-Jugend |
| 1994 | Belarus | In the fog | У тумане | Sergei Govenka | |
| 1994 | United States; Canada | The Ascent | | Donald Shebib | Based on actual events. Italian escape of British POW camp to plant Italian flag on summit of Mount Kenya |
| 1994 | France | A Day Before Dawn | Un jour avant l'aube | Jacques Ertaud | French SAS commando in Brittany during Operation Overlord and Normandy Campaign, 1944 |
| 1994 | New Zealand | The Last Tattoo | | John Reid | A U.S. Marine is murdered in Wellington when soldiers fraternize with locals |
| 1994 | Italy | Dear Goddamned Friends | Cari fottutissimi amici | Mario Monicelli | Comedy. A group of boxers, including an American black deserter, travel from town to town in Tuscany during the summer of 1944 |

=== 1995–1999 ===
| Year | Country | Main title (Alternative titles) | Original title (Original script) | Director | Battles, campaigns, events depicted |
|---|---|---|---|---|---|
| 1995 | Russia | I, a Russian soldier | Я — русский солдат | Andrei Malyukov | Drama, Romance, War. Defense of Brest Fortress |
| 1995 | Italy | Childhood Enemies | Nemici d'infanzia | Luigi Magni | Italian Civil War in Rome, 1944 |
| 1995 | France | A French Woman | Une femme française | Régis Wargnier | While waiting for his husband's return from a POW camp during WWII, Jeanne gets involved on different affairs with his husband's comrades-in-arms. |
| 1995 | Canada; Japan | Hiroshima (TV) | | Roger Spottiswoode | Decision-making processes regarding use of atomic bombs on Japanese cities of Hiroshima and Nagasaki |
| 1995 | Poland; Germany; France | Holy Week | Wielki tydzień (in Polish) | Andrzej Wajda | Holocaust |
| 1995 | Denmark | Just a Girl | Kun en pige | Peter Schrøder | German occupation of Denmark |
| 1995 | Australia; Japan | The Last Bullet (TV) | Rasutobaretto (ラストバレット) | Michael Pattinson | Australian and Japanese soldiers battle in South Pacific jungle on last day of war |
| 1995 | China | Red Cherry | Hóng yīng táo (红樱桃) | Daying Ye | Chinese boarding school children in German-occupied Soviet Union |
| 1995 | United States | Sahara (Desert Storm) (TV) | | Brian Trenchard-Smith | Western Desert Campaign; remake of 1943 film Sahara |
| 1995 | United States | Truman (TV) | | Frank Pierson | Drama. Biopic of US President Harry S. Truman from artillery service in World War I |
| 1995 | United States | The Tuskegee Airmen | | Robert Markowitz | First African-American combat pilots of the war |
| 1995 | Yugoslavia; France; Germany | Underground | Podzemlje (Подземље) | Emir Kusturica | German invasion and occupation of Yugoslavia |
| 1995 | Netherlands | The Partisans (TV miniseries) | De Partizanen | Theu Boermans | Dutch resistance unit capture a group of German soldiers, just weeks before the liberation of The Netherlands. Based on true facts |
| 1995 | Japan | Tower of the Lilies | Himeyuri no Tô (ひめゆりの塔) | Seijirō Kōyama | Himeyuri students in Battle of Okinawa |
| 1996 | Italy | The Border | La Frontiera | Franco Giraldi | Drama. Italian officer born in Dalmatia spends his convalescence in a Dalmatian island occupied by the Italian Army |
| 1996 | United Kingdom | The Brylcreem Boys | | Terence Ryan | Comedy-drama. British and German pilots in POW camp in neutral Ireland during Battle of Britain |
| 1996 | United Kingdom; United States | The English Patient | | Anthony Minghella | 1996 Best Picture romantic-drama. Biography of Hungarian Count László Almásy, injured cartographer who charts Sahara Desert in Italian Campaign |
| 1996 | Germany; Norway; Sweden; Denmark | Hamsun | Hamsun | Jan Troell | Norwegian author Knut Hamsun and wife during German occupation of Norway |
| 1996 | United States | Mother Night | | Keith Gordon | American writer living in Germany at the start of the war. Based on Kurt Vonnegut novel |
| 1996 | France; Germany; United Kingdom | The Ogre | Der Unhold (in German) | Volker Schlöndorff | French POW recruiting children for Nazis believing he is protecting them |
| 1996 | United Kingdom | Over Here (TV) | | Tony Dow | Comedy-drama. British and American aircrew rivalry in England |
| 1996 | United States | The Ring (Danielle Steel's The Ring) (TV) | | Armand Mastroianni | Romance/Drama. Young German woman separated from her family and imprisoned by Nazis |
| 1996 | Italy; Hungary | The Seventh Chamber | La settima stanza (in Italian); A hetedik szoba (in Hungarian) | Márta Mészáros | Jewish German philosopher Edith Stein, converts to Christianity, after being influenced by the writings of St Teresa of Avila amidst growing conflicts |
| 1996 | Thailand | Sunset at Chaophraya | Khu gam คู่กรรม (in Thai) | Euthana Mukdasanit | Free Thai Movement and Siam under Japanese occupation of Thailand, 1939–1944 |
| 1996 | United States | Surviving Picasso | | James Ivory | The stormy relationship between artist Pablo Picasso and his lover Francoise Gilot during the German occupation of France |
| 1997 | Belarus; Germany; Russia | From Hell to Hell | З пекла ў пекла Из ада в ад | Dmitry Astrakhan | Drama, War. |
| 1997 | United Kingdom; Japan | Bent | | Sean Mathias | Drama based on Martin Sherman play. Persecution of homosexuals in Nazi Germany |
| 1997 | Denmark; United Kingdom; Germany | The Island on Bird Street | Øen i Fuglegaden (in Danish); Die Insel in der Vogelstrasse (in German) | Søren Kragh-Jacobsen | Polish-Jewish boy hiding in ghetto from Nazis |
| 1997 | United Kingdom | The Land Girls | | David Leland | Women's Land Army who worked on rural British farms during the war whilst farmworkers were away |
| 1997 | Italy | Life Is Beautiful | La vita è bella | Roberto Benigni | Comedy-drama. Holocaust under German occupation of Italy |
| 1997 | France | Lucie Aubrac | Lucie Aubrac | Claude Berri | Lucie and Raymond Aubrac under German occupation of France |
| 1997 | Australia; United States | Paradise Road | | Bruce Beresford | Allied women POWs in Japanese-occupied Sumatra |
| 1998 | Poland | Deserter's Gold | Złoto dezerterów | Janusz Majewski | Heist comedy. World War I buddies reuniting with Polish Underground to liberate Nazi gold; sequel to 1986 film C.K. dezerterzy |
| 1998 | Japan; France | Dr. Akagi | Kanzō-sensei (カンゾー先生) | Shohei Imamura | Comedy-drama. rural Japanese physician trying to eradicate hepatitis while at odds with Imperial Japanese Army |
| 1998 | Italy | Little Teachers | I piccoli maestri | Daniele Luchetti | Italian resistance movement in Veneto |
| 1998 | United States | Miracle at Midnight (TV) | | Ken Cameron | Holocaust, Danish Resistance, and rescue of Danish Jews during German occupation of Denmark |
| 1998 | Japan | Pride: The Fateful Moment | Puraido: Unmei no toki (プライド – 運命のトキません) | Shunya Ito | Hideki Tojo during post-war Tokyo Trials |
| 1998 | United States | Saving Private Ryan | | Steven Spielberg | Team of U.S. Army Rangers search for single U.S. soldier during the Normandy Campaign |
| 1998 | United States | The Thin Red Line | | Terrence Malick | US infantrymen and Henderson Field during the Guadalcanal Campaign |
| 1998 | United States | When Trumpets Fade | | John Irvin | US troops fighting German forces during the Battle of Hürtgen Forest |
| 1999 | Germany | Aimée & Jaguar (Aimee and Jaguar) | Aimée & Jaguar | Max Färberböck | Romance between lesbians Felice Schragenheim and Lilly Wust amidst Gestapo purge of Jews in Berlin |
| 1999 | Czech Republic; Poland; Slovakia | All My Loved Ones | Všichni moji blízcí (in Czech) | Matej Minac | Jewish Czech family, Nicholas Winton, and escape of 669 children from the Holocaust |
| 1999 | Finland | Ambush | Rukajärven tie | Olli Saarela | Finnish Army and Women's Auxiliary Corps Lotta Svärd during Continuation War, 1941 |
| 1999 | Croatia | Bleiburg | Četverored | Branko Schmidt | Bleiburg death marches; forced repatriations of Axis-affiliated individuals from Allied-occupied Austria at the end of the war |
| 1999 | United Kingdom; United States | The End of the Affair | | Neil Jordan | Based on Graham Greene novel. British homefront and illicit romance; remake of 1955 film The End of the Affair |
| 1999 | Germany; Hungary | Gloomy Sunday | Ein Lied von Liebe und Tod (in German) | Rolf Schübel | Romance drama based on Nick Barkow novel. |
| 1999 | France; United States; Hungary | Jakob the Liar | | Peter Kassovitz | Comedy-drama. "Secret radio" in Jewish ghetto of Poland and Holocaust |
| 1999 | China | Lover's Grief over the Yellow River (Heart of China) | Húanghé júeliàn (黄河绝恋) | Feng Xiaoning | American pilot returns to pay respects to communist-led Chinese army that rescued him |
| 1999 | Russia; Germany; Japan; Italy; France | Moloch | Molokh (Молох) (in Russian) | Aleksandr Sokurov | Hitler visits Bavarian Berghof, 1942 |
| 1999 | Germany; Austria; Canada; Hungary | Sunshine | | István Szabó | Three generations of Jewish family including Holocaust, Operation Margarethe and German occupation of Hungary |
| 1999 | Italy; United Kingdom | Tea with Mussolini | | Franco Zeffirelli | Comedy-drama. Italian boy's upbringing by English and American women before and during war in Fascist Italy |

== 2000s ==
=== 2000–2004 ===
| Year | Country | Main title (Alternative titles) | Original title (Original script) | Director | Battles, campaigns, events depicted |
|---|---|---|---|---|---|
| 2000 | Canada; Germany; United Kingdom | Bonhoeffer: Agent of Grace | | Eric Till | German Lutheran pastor and martyr, Dietrich Bonhoeffer |
| 2000 | China | Devils on the Doorstep | Guizi lai le (鬼子来了) | Jiang Wen | Sino-Japanese War |
| 2000 | Czech Republic | Divided We Fall | Musíme si pomáhat | Jan Hřebejk | Collaboration and resistance under German occupation of Czechoslovakia |
| 2000 | Italy | Johnny the Partisan | Il partigiano Johnny | Guido Chiesa | Partisan warfare in North Italy |
| 2000 | Poland | Judgement of Franciszek Klos (TV) | Wyrok na Franciszka Kłosa | Andrzej Wajda | Collaboration under German occupation of Poland |
| 2000 | Malaysia | Lieutenant Adnan | Leftenan Adnan | Aziz M. Osman | Adnan Bin Saidi and the Battle of Pasir Panjang |
| 2000 | Italy | Malena | Malèna | Giuseppe Tornatore | Romance/Comedy-drama. Sicilian woman whose husband is conscripted into Italian service, 1940 |
| 2000 | Philippines | Markova: Comfort Gay | | Gil Portes | Drama based on Walter Dempster, Jr., account of last surviving comfort gay from Japanese occupation of Philippines |
| 2000 | Canada; United States | Nuremberg (TV miniseries) | | Yves Simoneau | Nuremberg Trials |
| 2000 | Italy | The Sky Is Falling | Il cielo cade | Andrea Frazzi; Antonio Frazzi | German occupation in Tuscany and the murder of Albert Einstein's relatives |
| 2000 | Czech Republic | Spring of Life | Pramen života | Milan Cieslar | Nazi SS and Lebensborn |
| 2000 | United States | U-571 | | Jonathan Mostow | American submariners infiltrate U-boat to capture Enigma machine |
| 2001 | Russia | Night on the Cordon | Ночь на кордоне | Vasiliy Panin | Drama, War. |
| 2001 | Russia | Holiday | Праздник | Garik Sukachov | Drama, Romance, War. |
| 2001 | Russia; Belarus | In August of 1944 | В августе 44-го… | Mikhail Ptashuk | Action, Mystery, Drama, Thriller, War. SMERSH |
| 2001 | Germany; Russia | As Far as My Feet Will Carry Me | So weit die Füße tragen (in German) | Hardy Martins | Based on Clemens Forell book. German soldier walks 11,000 km to escape Siberian gulag |
| 2001 | United States | Band of Brothers (TV miniseries) | | Phil Alden Robinson; Richard Loncraine; Mikael Salomon; David Nutter; Tom Hanks; David Leland; David Frankel; Tony To | E Company, 506th Infantry Regiment, 101st Airborne from D-Day to end of war |
| 2001 | United Kingdom; France; United States | Captain Corelli's Mandolin | | John Madden | Italian occupation of Greece and massacre of the Acqui Division |
| 2001 | United Kingdom; Australia | Charlotte Gray | | Gillian Armstrong | Romance/Thriller. Special Operations Executive and Scotswoman recruited by Secret Service as courier for French Communist Resistance |
| 2001 | United Kingdom; United States | Conspiracy (TV) | | Frank Pierson | German officials at Wannsee Conference in 1942 discuss Final Solution to Jewish question (remake of The Wannsee Conference) |
| 2001 | Czech Republic; United Kingdom | Dark Blue World | Tmavomodrý svět | Jan Svěrák | Czechoslovak pilots in Battle of Britain |
| 2001 | Italy | The Days of Rage: Cefalonia | I giorni dell'amore e dell'odio | Claver Salizzato | Massacre of the Acqui Division in Cephalonia |
| 2001 | United States; Germany; United Kingdom; Ireland | Enemy at the Gates | | Jean-Jacques Annaud | Stand-off between Russian sniper Vasily Zaytsev and German sniper during Battle of Stalingrad |
| 2001 | United Kingdom; United States; Germany; Netherlands | Enigma | | Michael Apted | How the German Enigma machine was cracked by the codebreakers at Bletchley Park |
| 2001 | Japan | Firefly | Hotaru (ホタル) | Yasuo Furuhata | Based on true story of Korean kamikaze pilot |
| 2001 | United States | The Grey Zone | | Tim Blake Nelson | Jewish Sonderkommando XII in Auschwitz concentration camp |
| 2001 | Japan | H Story | Japanese please (Kanji please) | Nobuhiro Suwa | Remake of 1959 film Hiroshima mon amour |
| 2001 | Philippines | In the Bosom of the Enemy | Gatas... Sa dibdib ng kaaway | Gil Portes | Filipina offers to be wet nurse to Japanese soldier's son for conditional freedom of her husband |
| 2001 | Italy | The Ones With White Lips - The Forgotten | Sos laribiancos - I dimenticati | Piero Livi | Sardinian soldiers are dispatched to the Russian Front |
| 2001 | United States | Pearl Harbor | | Michael Bay | Attack on Pearl Harbor and the subsequent Doolittle Raid |
| 2001 | China | Purple Sunset | Zĭrì (紫日) | Feng Xiaoning | Unconditional surrender of Emperor Hirohito |
| 2001 | France; United Kingdom; Germany; Austria | Taking Sides | | István Szabó | Wilhelm Furtwängler, controversial conductor of Berlin Philharmonic during Nazi era and Allied occupation |
| 2001 | United States | To End All Wars | | David L. Cunningham | Drama based on Ernest Gordon book. Allied POWs build Burma Railway through jungle |
| 2001 | United States | Uprising (TV) | | Jon Avnet | Warsaw Ghetto Uprising |
| 2001 | United Kingdom; United States; Canada | Varian's War (TV) | | Lionel Chetwynd | Varian Fry builds underground rescue network in Vichy France saving 2–4,000 anti-Nazi/Jewish refugees and cultural figures from Holocaust |
| 2001 | United Kingdom; Canada | The War Bride (Love and War) | | Lyndon Chubbuck | Drama. English war bride in Canada without husband |
| 2001 | Philippines | Yamashita: The Tiger's Treasure | Tagalog please | Chito S. Roño | Burial of Yamashita treasure and execution of General Tomoyuki Yamashita in Philippines |
| 2002 | United States | Below | | David Twohy | American submarine on Atlantic rescue mission encounters German warship |
| 2002 | Italy | Senso '45 | Senso '45 | Tinto Brass | Erotic drama. The love affair of an Italian woman and an SS officer in German-occupied Venice |
| 2002 | Russia | The Cuckoo | Kukushka (Кукушка) | Aleksandr Rogozhkin | Young Lapp woman shelters Finnish sniper and Red Army captain on her farm |
| 2002 | Italy | El Alamein: The Line of Fire (El Alamein: Bound of Honour, DVD) | El Alamein – La linea del fuoco | Enzo Monteleone | Italian volunteer assigned to Pavia Division in Egypt and Second Battle of El Alamein, 1942 |
| 2002 | United States; United Kingdom | The Gathering Storm | | Richard Loncraine | Winston Churchill before outbreak of war |
| 2002 | United States; Italy | The Good War | Texas 46 | Giorgio Serafini | Based on true story of Italian POWs in Texas camp before repatriation, 1946 |
| 2002 | United States | Hart's War | | Gregory Hoblit | POW trial conducted in German Stalag Luft |
| 2002 | France | Monsieur Batignole | Monsieur Batignole | Gérard Jugnot | Butcher hides Jewish boy in Occupied France |
| 2002 | Italy | Perlasca, The Courage of a Just Man (TV miniseries) | Perlasca, un eroe italiano | Alberto Negrin | Giorgio Perlasca, pretending to be a Spanish diplomat, saves Hungarian Jews from the Holocaust |
| 2002 | France; Poland; Germany; United Kingdom | The Pianist | | Roman Polanski | Polish Jewish pianist Władysław Szpilman years of searching for shelter during World War II |
| 2002 | France; Germany | Safe Conduct | Laissez passer | Bertrand Tavernier | German occupation of France |
| 2002 | Canada | Silent Night | | Rodney Gibbons | Based on true event during the Battle of the Bulge between German and American soldiers on Christmas Eve 1944 |
| 2002 | Russia | The Star | Zvezda (Звезда) | Nikolai Lebedev | Soviet scouts behind enemy lines during Operation Bagration |
| 2002 | Netherlands | Twin Sisters | De Tweeling | Ben Sombogaart | Twin German sisters separated at young age, one raised in Netherlands and serves in Dutch resistance, other in Germany and married to Waffen SS soldier |
| 2002 | United Kingdom | Two Men Went to War | | John Henderson | Comedy-drama based on Raymond Foxall book. Amateur improvisational commando raid into occupied France |
| 2002 | Italy | The War Is Over (TV miniseries) | La guerra è finita | Lodovico Gasparini | Drama. Two Italian friends and soldiers on the Greek front, then on the Russian front and finally in the Italian Civil War |
| 2002 | United States | Windtalkers | | John Woo | Bilingual Navajo speakers serving with the USMC during the Pacific War |
| 2003 | Germany; Belarus | Babiy Yar | | Jeff Kanew | Drama. Babiy Yar |
| 2003 | Russia | Red Sky, Black Snow | Красное небо. Чёрный снег | Valeriy Ogorodnikov | Drama, War. |
| 2003 | Russia | The Taurus Constellation | В созвездии Быка | Pyotr Todorovsky | Romance, War. |
| 2003 | Ukraine | One is a warrior in the field | Один — в полі воїн | Gennady Virsta; Oleh Mosiichuk | |
| 2003 | Russia | The Last Train | Последний поезд | Aleksei Alekseivich German | Drama, War. |
| 2003 | France | Bon Voyage | Bon Voyage | Jean-Paul Rappeneau | France under German occupation |
| 2003 | United Kingdom | Entrusted | | Giacomo Battiato | 11-year-old chess prodigy, whose mother is in underground resistance, is entrusted with life-saving secret |
| 2003 | Malaysia | Paloh | Paloh | Adman Salleh | Japanese occupation of Malaya |
| 2003 | Poland | Pornography | Pornografia | Jan Jakub Kolski | German Occupation of Poland |
| 2003 | United States; Netherlands | Resistance | | Todd Komarnicki | American reconnaissance pilot survives plane crash in Nazi-occupied Belgium and is assisted by Maquis resistance |
| 2003 | Germany; Netherlands | Rosenstrasse | Rosenstrasse (in German) | Margarethe von Trotta | Jewish husbands of Aryan women detained in Berlin |
| 2003 | United States | Saints and Soldiers | | Ryan Little | Survivors of Malmedy massacre during Ardennes Offensive trapped behind enemy lines with vital information |
| 2003 | Japan; Germany | Spy Sorge | Supai Sorge (スパイ・ゾルゲ) (in Japanese) | Masahiro Shinoda | Soviet spy Richard Sorge who worked undercover in wartime Germany & Japan |
| 2003 | France | Strange Gardens | Effroyables jardins | Jean Becker | French Resistance captives held in giant pit by Germans |
| 2003 | France; United Kingdom | Strayed | Les égarés (Le garçon aux yeux gris) | André Téchiné | Romance-drama. French family escapes Battle of France and German occupation of Paris aided by young man, June 1940 |
| 2003 | Czech Republic; Slovakia; Austria | Želary | | Ondrej Trojan | Drama based on Květa Legátová novel. Czechoslovak Resistance forced into hiding after their group is exposed |
| 2004 | Belarus | You have a task | Вам — задание | Yuriy Berzhitskiy | Drama. |
| 2004 | Belarus | More About War | Ещё о войне | Pyotr Krivostanenko | Romance, War. |
| 2004 | Russia | Daddy | Папа | Vladimir Mashkov | Drama. |
| 2004 | Russia | The Saboteur | Диверсант | Andrei Malyukov | Action, Drama, War. |
| 2004 | Russia | On the Nameless Height | На безымянной высоте | Vyacheslav Nikiforov | War. |
| 2004 | Russia; United States; Belarus | The Burning Land | В июне 41-го | Mikhail Ptashuk | Action, Drama, Romance, War. |
| 2004 | Philippines | Aishite Imasu 1941: Mahal Kita | Aishite Imasu 1941: Mahal Kita (Aishite Imasu (Mahal Kita) 1941) | Joel Lamangan | Romance-Drama. Philippine Resistance during Battle of Bataan, Bataan Death March, and Japanese occupation |
| 2004 | United States | The Aryan Couple | | John Daly | Undercover Eastern European Jews attempt to escape under Third Reich's Europa Plan, 1944 |
| 2004 | Finland; Sweden | Beyond the Front Line (Beyond Enemy Lines) | Framom främsta linjen (in Swedish) | Åke Lindman | Continuation War between USSR and Finland, 1941–1944 |
| 2004 | Russia | The Cadets (TV miniseries) | Kursanty (Курсанты) | Andrei Kavun | Drama, War. Training of Russian boys as artillerymen for Eastern Front, 1942 |
| 2004 | Philippines | The Call of the River | Panaghoy sa Suba | Cesar Montano | Second Battle of Bohol in Philippines Campaign |
| 2004 | Germany; Italy; Austria | Downfall | Der Untergang (in German) | Oliver Hirschbiegel | Last days of Hitler in Führerbunker during Battle of Berlin |
| 2004 | United Kingdom | Dunkirk (TV miniseries) | | Alex Holmes | Docudrama. Battle of Dunkirk and Dunkirk evacuation |
| 2004 | Germany; Switzerland; Netherlands; Luxembourg | Edelweiss Pirates | Edelweisspiraten (in German) | Niko von Glasow | The Edelweiss Pirates and wartime German Resistance |
| 2004 | Japan | The Face of Jizo (film) | Chichi to Kuraseba (父と暮らせば) | Kazuo Kuroki | Aftermath of atomic bombing of Hiroshima |
| 2004 | United States; Germany; Italy | The Fallen (Letters From The Dead) | | Ari Taub | German, Italian and US forces on Italian Front, 1944 |
| 2004 | Russia | Freelance Assignment | Nesluzhebnoe zadanie (Неслужебное задание) | Vitaly Vorobyev | Red Army chases renegade Wehrmacht in Czechoslovakia after German surrender, 1945 |
| 2004 | United Kingdom; Canada | Head in the Clouds | | John Duigan | Romance-drama. Friends' divergent paths and fight against Fascism in pre-war Europe |
| 2004 | Russia | Our Own | Свои | Dmitry Meshiev | Drama on occupied territory, early years of war |
| 2004 | United States | Ike: Countdown to D-Day | | Robert Harmon | SHAEF organization and planning of Operation Overlord |
| 2004 | Canada | Il Duce Canadese (TV miniseries) | (in English) | Giles Walker | Italian-Canadian fascism and internment |
| 2004 | United States | In Enemy Hands (U-Boat) | | Tony Giglio | Crew of US submarine returns home after months at sea as POWs aboard U-boat |
| 2004 | United Kingdom | Island at War (TV miniseries) | | Peter Lydon, Thaddeus O'Sullivan | German Occupation of the Channel Islands |
| 2004 | Croatia | Long Dark Night | Duga mračna noć | Antun Vrdoljak | Croatia under both Fascism and Communism |
| 2004 | Germany | Before the Fall | Napola – Elite für den Führer | Dennis Gansel | Former Hitler Youths bond at Reich National-Political institution |
| 2004 | India | Netaji Subhas Chandra Bose: The Forgotten Hero | | Shyam Benegal | The film depicts the life of the Indian Independence leader Subhas Chandra Bose in Nazi Germany: 1941–1943, and In Japanese-occupied Asia 1943–1945, and the events leading to the formation of Azad Hind Fauj. |
| 2004 | Germany | The Ninth Day | Der neunte Tag | Volker Schlöndorff | SS attempts to coerce Catholic priest into writing Vatican on behalf of Church of Luxembourg demanding that Pope support Hitler |
| 2004 | Germany; Austria | Operation Valkyrie (TV) | Stauffenberg | Jo Baier | July 20 plot by German army commanders to assassinate Hitler |
| 2004 | China | Purple Butterfly | Zǐ Húdié (紫蝴蝶) | Lou Ye | Espionage warfare in occupied Shanghai |
| 2004 | United States | Straight Into Darkness | | Jeff Burr | American deserters and Resistance orphans attempt to hold back Nazi assault |

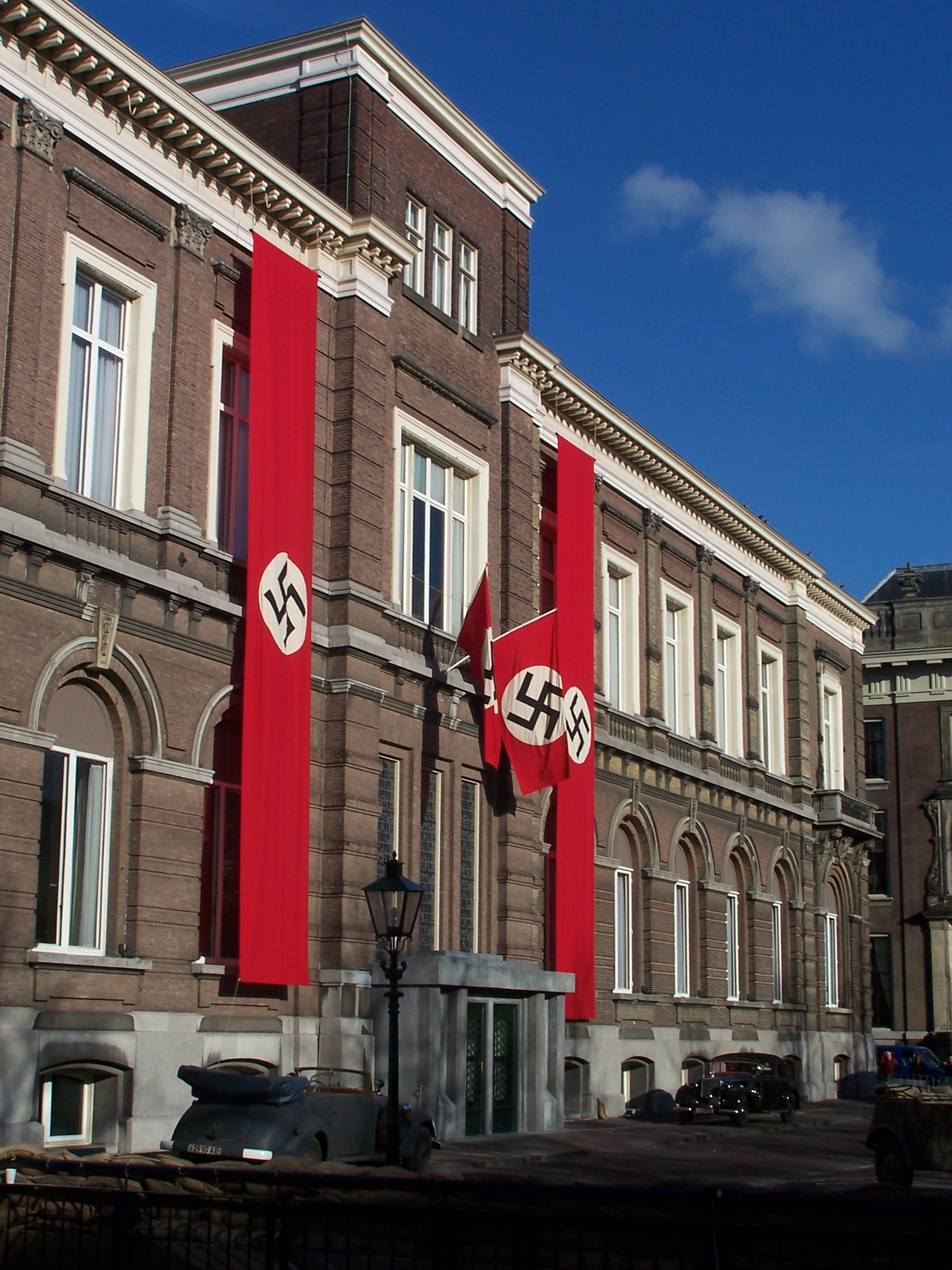
Movie set from Black Book in The Hague, 2005

=== 2005–2009 ===
| Year | Country | Main title (Alternative titles) | Original title (Original script) | Director | Battles, campaigns, events depicted |
|---|---|---|---|---|---|
| 2005 | Russia; United States | The Second Front | | Dmitriy Fiks | Action, Romance, War. |
| 2005 | Russia | Cranes over Ilmen | Журавли над Ильменем | Nikita Arzhakov | Battle on Lake Ilmen |
| 2005 | Belarus | Deep Current | Глубокое течение | Margarita Kasymova; Ivan Pavlov | Drama. |
| 2005 | Russia | The First After God | Первый после Бога | Vasiliy Chiginskiy | Action, Drama, War. Alexander Marinesko |
| 2005 | Russia | The Last Battle of Major Pugachev | Последний бой майора Пугачёва | Vladimir Fatyanov | |
| 2005 | Russia | A Time to Gather Stones | Время собирать камни | Aleksei Karelin | War. |
| 2005 | Germany; Russia | Twilight | Полумгла | Artem Antonov | Drama, War. |
| 2005 | Italy | Cephalonia (TV miniseries) | Cefalonia | Riccardo Milani | Massacre of the Acqui Division in Cephalonia |
| 2005 | United States | Everything Is Illuminated | | Liev Schreiber | Jewish American searches for woman who saved his grandfather during the Ukrainian Holocaust |
| 2005 | Lithuania | Forest of the Gods | Dievų miškas | Algimantas Puipa | Lithuanian artist/intellectual imprisoned by both Nazis and Soviets |
| 2005 | Russia | Freelance Assignment 2 | Nesluzhebnoe zadanie 2: Vzryv na rassvete (Неслужебное задание-2: Взрыв на рассвете) | Vitaly Vorobyev | Postwar commandos in wartime minefield hope to be saved by soldier who was in field in 1943 |
| 2005 | United States; Australia | The Great Raid | | John Dahl | Japanese occupation of Philippines and Raid at Cabanatuan |
| 2005 | Italy | The Heart in the Pit (TV miniseries) | Il cuore nel pozzo | Alberto Negrin | Foibe massacres of Italian civilians by Yugoslav Partisans |
| 2005 | United States | The Last Days | | Eric Bryan | US Airborne unit processing German POWs encounters Wehrmacht unit unaware of Germany's surrender |
| 2005 | United Kingdom | The Last Drop | | David Teague | Operation Market Garden and secret mission to recover Nazi gold |
| 2005 | Russia | Attention, Says Moscow! (TV miniseries) | Vnimaniye, govorit Moskva (Внимание, говорит Москва) | Aleksandr Surin | Drama, War. Female Russian snipers. |
| 2005 | Finland; Sweden | Mother of Mine | Äideistä parhain (in Finnish); Den bästa av mödrar (in Swedish) | Klaus Härö | Based on Heikki Hietamies novel. Evacuation of 70,000+ Finnish children to neutral Sweden |
| 2005 | Italy | Mussolini's Daughter (TV miniseries) | Edda | Giorgio Capitani | Story of Edda Mussolini |
| 2005 | India | Netaji Subhas Chandra Bose: The Forgotten Hero (Bose: The Forgotten Hero) | Netaji Subhas Chandra Bose: ek bhoola hua naayak (नेताजी सुभाषचन्द्र बोस: एक भूला हुआ नायक) | Shyam Benegal | Subhas Chandra Bose and the Indian National Army |
| 2005 | United States | Only the Brave | | Lane Nishikawa | Rescue of Lost Battalion in France by US 442nd Regimental Combat Team |
| 2005 | China | On the Mountain of Tai Hang | Tài Háng shān shàng (太行山上) | Chen Jian, Shen Dong, Wei Lian | Campaigns of Eighth Route Army in China |
| 2005 | Finland | Promise | Lupaus (Uskolliset – Suomen lotat / Lotta) | Ilkka Vanne | Finnish women's Lotta Svärd during war |
| 2005 | Germany | Sophie Scholl – The Final Days | Sophie Scholl – Die letzten Tage | Marc Rothemund | Final days and trial of Sophie Scholl, member of White Rose Resistance |
| 2005 | Germany | Speer und Er (TV miniseries) | Speer und Er | Heinrich Breloer | Docudrama. Hitler's minister Albert Speer |
| 2005 | Taiwan | The Strait Story | Fu shih kuang ying (南方紀事之浮世光影) | Huang Yu-shan | Sinking of Japanese passenger liner Takachiho Maru by USS Kingfish, 1943 |
| 2005 | Russia; France; Italy; Switzerland; Japan | The Sun | Solntse (Солнце) (in Russian) | Aleksandr Sokurov | Emperor Hirohito's life during the first days of Allied occupation |
| 2005 | United Kingdom | Valiant | | Gary Chapman | Animated. British war pigeons carrying secret messages face German falcons |
| 2005 | United Kingdom; United States; Germany; China | The White Countess | | James Ivory | Disparate group of displaced persons attempt to survive Sino-Japanese War |
| 2005 | Japan | Yamato | Otoko-tachi no Yamato (男たちの大和) | Junya Sato | Yamato's crew during Pacific War |
| 2005 | Ukraine | Long shot | Далекий постріл Далёкий выстрел | Valeriy Shalyga | War. |
| 2006 | Russia | The Last Confession | Последняя исповедь | Sergei Lyalin | Young Guard |
| 2006 | Uzbekistan | The Homeland | Vatan | Zulfiqor Musoqov | Drama. |
| 2006 | Russia; Belarus | Height 89 | Высота 89 | Vyacheslav Nikiforov | |
| 2006 | Russia | Secret weapon | Секретное оружие | Vitaly Vorobyov | |
| 2006 | Russia | Chronicle of "Hell" | Хроника „Ада“ | Mikhail Shevchuk | Action. |
| 2006 | Russia | Victory Day | День Победы | Fyodor Petrukhin | Drama, War. |
| 2006 | Russia | The Confrontation | Противостояние | Vitaliy Vorobyov; Lyubov Sviridova | Drama, Romance, War. |
| 2006 | Russia | Under a Deluge of Bullets | Под ливнем пуль | Vitaliy Vorobyov | Drama, Romance, War. |
| 2006 | Russia | Franz + Polina | Франц + Полина | Mikhail Segal | Drama, Romance, War. |
| 2006 | Russia | Bastards | Svolochi (Сволочи) | Aleksandr Atanesyan | Teenaged convicts conscripted for partisan mission against Nazis. Shtrafbat |
| 2006 | United States | Beautiful Dreamer | | Terri Farley-Teruel | Romance-drama. Amnesiac US bomber pilot captured by Germans after crashing and is assumed by family to be MIA |
| 2006 | Netherlands; Germany; United Kingdom; Belgium | Black Book | Zwartboek (in Dutch) | Paul Verhoeven | Jewish woman joins Dutch Resistance |
| 2006 | France; Morocco; Algeria; Belgium | Days of Glory | Indigènes (in French) | Rachid Bouchareb | North Africans enlist in French Army to liberate France |
| 2006 | Germany | Dresden (TV) | Dresden | Roland Suso Richter | German civilian assists downed and injured RAF pilot after bombing of Dresden |
| 2006 | United States | Flags of Our Fathers | | Clint Eastwood | Battle of Iwo Jima from perspective of American soldiers |
| 2006 | Germany; Lithuania | Ghetto | Ghetto; Vilniaus getas | Audrius Juzėnas | Holocaust in Lithuania |
| 2006 | Italy | The Good Battle - Don Pietro Pappagallo (TV miniseries) | La buona battaglia – Don Pietro Pappagallo | Gianfranco Albano | Catholic priest Pietro Pappagallo, member of resistance, executed in the Ardeatine caves |
| 2006 | United States | The Good German | | Steven Soderbergh | Mystery set in Berlin during the Potsdam negotiations just after the surrender of Nazi Germany |
| 2006 | United Kingdom | The Haunted Airman | | Chris Durlacher | Disabled British airman recovering from his experiences near end of war |
| 2006 | Australia | Kokoda | | Alister Grierson | Kokoda Track Campaign fought during 1942 in the then Australian Territory of Papua. |
| 2006 | Germany | The Last Days | Die letzten Tage | Oliver Frohnauer | American airmen behind enemy lines cooperate with German deserter to survive arrival of Volkssturm unit near end of war |
| 2006 | Germany | The Last Train | Der letzte Zug | Dana Vávrová, Joseph Vilsmaier | Cattle train with 688 Jews bound for Auschwitz, 1943 |
| 2006 | United States | Letters from Iwo Jima | Iōjima kara no tegami (硫黄島からの手紙) | Clint Eastwood | Battle of Iwo Jima from perspective of Japanese soldiers |
| 2006 | Italy | Mafalda of Savoy (TV miniseries) | Mafalda di Savoia – Il coraggio di una principessa | Maurizio Zaccaro | Princess Mafalda of Savoy; a real Italian princess, forced by war into a concentration camp |
| 2006 | United States | Military Intelligence and You! | | Dale Kutzera | Comedy. US Army Intelligence analyst attempts to locate Nazi "Ghost Squadron" fighter base |
| 2006 | Canada | Remembrance: A Soldier's Story (TV) | | Andrew Forster | Drama. Canada's last surviving decorated World War II hero and Remembrance Day |
| 2006 | Russia | Transit | Peregon (Перегон) | Aleksandr Rogozhkin | Lend-Lease shipping through the ALSIB |
| 2006 | China | The Tokyo Trial | Dōngjīng Shěnpàn (东京审判) | Gao Qunshu | Chinese Justice Mei Ru-ao at the Tokyo Trials, the International Military Tribunal for the Far East (IMTFE) |
| 2007 | Russia | The Adventures of Private Ivan Chonkin | Приключения солдата Ивана Чонкина | Aleksey Kiryushchenko | Adventure, Comedy, War. |
| 2007 | Russia; Ukraine | Sappers | Саперы | Boris Shcherbakov; Vasily Shcherbakov | |
| 2007 | Belarus | Homeland or death | Родина или смерть Радзіма або смерць | Alla Krinitsyna | War. Abwehrkommando-203 |
| 2007 | Russia | Propaganda brigade “Beat the enemy!” | Агитбригада «Бей врага!» | Vitaly Melnikov | Comedy. |
| 2007 | Russia; Belarus | Enemies | Враги | Mariya Mozhar | Drama, War. |
| 2007 | Belarus | The Witch and the Rumba | Чаклун и Румба | Andrey Golubev | Romance, War. |
| 2007 | Czech Republic | Operace Silver A | | Jiří Strach | Operation Silver A by the Czech government-in-exile against the occupying Nazi forces |
| 2007 | United States | American Pastime | | Desmond Nakano | Japanese-American jazz and baseball in Topaz, Utah internment camp |
| 2007 | United Kingdom | Atonement | | Joe Wright | The Battle for France and Dunkirk evacuation |
| 2007 | Austria | The Counterfeiters | Die Fälscher | Stefan Ruzowitzky | Operation Bernhard, a Nazi plan to destabilize the UK economy using vast amounts of forged money |
| 2007 | Australia | Curtin (TV) | | Jessica Hobbs | Wartime Prime Minister of Australia, John Curtin |
| 2007 | Japan | For Those We Love | Ore wa, kimi no tame ni koso shini ni iku (俺は、君のためにこそ死ににいく) | Taku Shinjō | Kamikaze pilots in the Pacific |
| 2007 | Poland | Katyń | Katyń | Andrzej Wajda | Katyn massacre of Polish POWs and civilians by Soviets, 1940 |
| 2007 | United States; China; Taiwan; Hong Kong | Lust, Caution | Sè, Jiè (色，戒) | Ang Lee | Spy thriller about Chinese spies in Japanese Occupied Shanghai |
| 2007 | Germany | My Führer – The Really Truest Truth about Adolf Hitler (My Führer) | Mein Führer – Die wirklich wahrste Wahrheit über Adolf Hitler | Dani Levy | Comedy-drama. Depressed Hitler and his preparation for New Year's speech of 1945 |
| 2007 | Canada | The Poet (Hearts of War) | | Damian Lee | German soldiers gather information on Eastern Front partisans and Jewish refugees |
| 2007 | Belgium | Surviving with Wolves | Survivre avec les loups | Véra Belmont | Drama based on fake Misha Defonseca memoir. Jewish girl searches for deported parents while living among wolves |
| 2007 | Finland | Tali-Ihantala 1944 | Tali-Ihantala 1944 (Mihin vapaat miehet pystyvät) | Åke Lindman, Sakari Kirjavainen | Battle of Tali-Ihantala, Continuation War, June 1944 |
| 2007 | Poland | Tomorrow We're Going to the Movies | Jutro idziemy do kina | Michał Kwieciński | War disrupts the plans of three recent high school graduates Polish Campaign, 1939 |
| 2007 | Japan | Yunagi City, Sakura Country | Yūnagi no machi, sakura no kuni (夕凪の街 桜の国) | Kiyoshi Sasabe | Drama based on Fumiyo Kōno manga. Aftermath of atomic bombing of Hiroshima |
| 2007 | Belgium; Ireland | Waiting for Dublin | | Roger Tucker | Comedy. Allied and Axis flyers stranded in neutral Ireland |
| 2008 | Russia | My Poor Marat | Мой бедный Марат | Mikhail Bogin | Drama, War. Siege of Leningrad |
| 2008 | Russia | Hasansky Waltz | Хасанский вальс | Mikhail Gotenko; Ekaterina Zhuravleva | Battle of Lake Khasan |
| 2008 | Ukraine; Russia | Not a step back | Ни шагу назад | Vitaliy Vorobyov | Drama, War. |
| 2008 | Russia | Live and Remember | Живи и помни | Aleksandr Proshkin | Drama, War. |
| 2008 | Russia | Doomed to War | Обречённые на войну | Olga Zhulina | Romance, War. |
| 2008 | Russia | Riorita | Риорита | Pyotr Todorovsky | Drama, War. |
| 2008 | Russia | A local battle | Бой местного значения | Alexey Kozlov | |
| 2008 | Russia | The Scouts: Last Fight | Разведчики: Последний бой | Alexander Zamyatin | War. |
| 2008 | Ukraine | Forty-five | Сорокапятка | Vyacheslav Afonin | |
| 2008 | Australia; United States; United Kingdom | Australia | | Baz Luhrmann | Romance. Australian soldier and British aristocrat during first attack on Darwin |
| 2008 | Italy | Blood of the Losers | Il sangue dei vinti | Michele Soavi | Family torn apart by political divisions during the Italian civil war |
| 2008 | United States; United Kingdom | The Boy in the Striped Pyjamas (The Boy in the Striped Pajamas) | | Mark Herman | Holocaust as seen by two 8-year-olds, one the son of death camp commandant, the other an interned Jew |
| 2008 | Germany | The Bridge (TV) | Die Brücke | Wolfgang Panzer | Drama based on Manfred Gregor novel. Youths defend bridge; remake |
| 2008 | Australia | Broken Sun | | Brad Haynes | Drama based on the Cowra breakout |
| 2008 | Romania | Gruber's Journey | Călătoria lui Gruber | Radu Gabrea | Iaşi pogrom |
| 2008 | Australia; China; Germany; United States | The Children of Huang Shi | | Roger Spottiswoode | Nanking Massacre and Three Alls Policy |
| 2008 | United States | Defiance | | Edward Zwick | Bielski partisans battle Nazi forces in Belarus |
| 2008 | Poland | 11th of November | 11 listopada | Kamil Kulczycki, Urszula Szałata | Zielonka boy scouts resisting German occupation of Poland |
| 2008 | France; United Kingdom | Female Agents | Les Femmes de l'ombre | Jean-Paul Salomé | Female SOE agents parachute into occupied France to assassinate German officer and rescue Briton with D-Day invasion information |
| 2008 | Denmark | Flame and Citron | Flammen og Citronen | Ole Christian Madsen | Danish Resistance team sent to assassinate Nazis and collaborators |
| 2008 | United Kingdom; Germany; Hungary | Good | | Vicente Amorim | German university professor during Nazi regime. Drama based on C. P. Taylor play. |
| 2008 | Hong Kong | Ip Man | Yip Man (葉問) | Wilson Yip | Ip Man in Foshan, Sino-Japanese War |
| 2008 | Belarus | A Local Skirmish | Локальная стычка (Russian); Мясцовая сутычка (Belarusian) | Alexie Kozlov | Russian recovery team encounters a Nazi special operations squad on its mission to blow a bridge during Battle of Nevel on 1 January 1944 |
| 2008 | Norway; Germany; Denmark | Max Manus: Man of War | Max Manus | Joachim Rønning, Espen Sandberg | Norwegian Resistance leader Max Manus during Nazi occupation of Norway |
| 2008 | United States | Miracle at St. Anna | | Spike Lee | US troops fighting in Italy near the location of the Sant'Anna di Stazzema massacre |
| 2008 | United States; Germany | The Reader | | Stephen Daldry | War crimes trial of female guard at Nazi concentration camp |
| 2008 | Israel | Spring 1941 | אביב 41 | Uri Barbash | Romance between Warsaw grocer and Jewish man she is hiding |
| 2008 | Czech Republic; Slovakia | Tobruk | Tobruk | Václav Marhoul | Siege of Tobruk |
| 2008 | United States | Valkyrie | | Bryan Singer | July 20 Plot to assassinate Hitler |
| 2008 | United States | Watch on the Rhine | | Nathan Hall, Chris Nelson | Action/Comedy. US 106th Inf. Div. soldier in Battle of the Bulge |
| 2008 | France; Tunisia | The Wedding Song | Le Chant des mariées اغنية العروس | Karin Albou | Friendship between Muslim woman and Sephardic Jewish woman during Nazi occupation of Tunisia |
| 2008 | Italy | Wild Blood | Sanguepazzo | Marco Tullio Giordana | Drama. The involvement of actors Osvaldo Valenti and Luisa Ferida with the Italian Social Republic and their murder by partisans |
| 2008 | Netherlands | Winter in Wartime | Oorlogswinter | Martin Koolhoven | Drama based on Jan Terlouw novel. Young boy becomes involved in Dutch Resistance, 1944–45 |
| 2008 | Germany; Poland | A Woman in Berlin (Anonyma: A Woman in Berlin) | Anonyma – Eine Frau in Berlin (in German) | Max Färberböck | Drama based on Marta Hillers book. Journalist's relationship with Soviet officer during Soviet occupation of Berlin |
| 2009 | Russia | Russian cross | Русский крест | Grigori Lyubomirov | |
| 2009 | Russia | The Crossing | Переправа | Dmitriy Makeev | War. |
| 2009 | Russia; Ukraine | Dot | Дот | Anatoliy Mateshko | Drama, War. |
| 2009 | Russia | Degraded Officer | Разжалованный | Vladimir Tumaev | Drama, War. |
| 2009 | Russia | Rowan Waltz | Рябиновый вальс | Aliona Rayner; Aleksandr Smirnov | Drama, History, War. |
| 2009 | Russia | One War | Одна война | Vera Glagoleva | Drama. |
| 2009 | Russia | Away from war | В сторону от войны | Alexey Kozlov | |
| 2009 | Russia | And there was a war | И была война | Alexey Feoktistov | |
| 2009 | Russia | Lieutenant Suvorov | Лейтенант Суворов | Alexey Kozlov | |
| 2009 | Russia | Barrier Detachment: Solo on a Minefield | Заградотряд: Соло на минном поле | Valentin Donskov | War. Barrier troops |
| 2009 | Russia | Moscow courtyard | Московский дворик | Vladimir Shchegolkov | |
| 2009 | Ukraine; Russia | There is no third option | Третьего не дано | Serhiy Sotnychenko | War. |
| 2009 | Russia | I'll come back | Я вернусь | Elena Nemykh | History. |
| 2009 | Russia; Ukraine | The Hunt for Werewolf | Охота на Вервольфа | Evgeniy Mitrofanov | Action, Adventure, War. Werwolf |
| 2009 | Belarus; Russia | Sniper: Weapon of Retaliation | Снайпер: Оружие возмездия | Aleksandr Efremov | Action, Drama, Romance, War. |
| 2009 | Belarus | Dnieper Line: Love and War | Днепровский рубеж | Denis Skvortsov | Action, Adventure, History, War. Siege of Mogilev |
| 2009 | France | The Army of Crime | L'Armée du crime | Robert Guédiguian | Manouchian resistance group and Red Poster |
| 2009 | Russia; United Kingdom | Attack on Leningrad (Leningrad) | | Aleksandr Buravsky | Siege of Leningrad |
| 2009 | China | City of Life and Death (Nanjing! Nanjing!) | Pinyin please (漢字 hanzi please) | Lu Chuan | Nanking Massacre |
| 2009 | China | Cow | Dòu niú (斗牛) | Guan Hu | Comedy-drama. Chinese peasant protects village's dairy cow during Sino-Japanese War |
| 2009 | United Kingdom | The Diary of Anne Frank (TV miniseries) | | Jon Jones | Anne Frank hiding during Nazi occupation of the Netherlands |
| 2009 | United States | Everyman's War | | Thad Smith | US 94th Infantry Division at Battle of the Bulge |
| 2009 | United States | Inglourious Basterds | | Quentin Tarantino | Alternate universe story of Jewish-American soldiers and a Jewish French girl on separate missions to assassinate Hitler and other Nazi commanders. |
| 2009 | United States; United Kingdom | Into the Storm | | Thaddeus O'Sullivan | Biopic of Winston Churchill and his wartime leadership; sequel to 2002 film The Gathering Storm |
| 2009 | Germany; China; France | John Rabe | John Rabe | Florian Gallenberger | Nanking Massacre |
| 2009 | Japan | Last Operations Under the Orion | Manatsu no Orion (真夏のオリオン) | Tetsuo Shinohara | Naval battle between Japan and US near end of war |
| 2009 | Italy | The Man Who Will Come | L'uomo che verrà | Giorgio Diritti | Marzabotto massacre of Italian civilians by Nazi forces |
| 2009 | China | The Message | Fēngshēng (风声) | Chen Kuo-fu, Gao Qunshu | Espionage in Nanking in 1942 |
| 2009 | Russia | 1941 (TV) | 1941 | Valery Shalyga | Nazi invasion of Russia and partisans in forests; prequel to 2011 TV series, 1942 |
| 2009 | Russia | The Priest | Pop (Поп) | Vladimir Khotinenko | Priest in occupied Latvia |
| 2009 | Czech Republic; Germany | Protector | Protektor | Marek Najbrt | Romance/Drama. Jewish-Czech actress during German occupation of Czechoslovakia and effects of Operation Anthropoid |
| 2009 | United Kingdom | Small Island (TV miniseries) | | John Alexander | Drama. Jamaican airman in England |

== 2010s ==
=== 2010–2014 ===
| Year | Country | Main title (Alternative titles) | Original title (Original script) | Director | Battles, campaigns, events depicted |
|---|---|---|---|---|---|
| 2010 | Russia; Ukraine | Two | Двое | Anatoliy Mateshko | Drama, War. |
| 2010 | Russia | A Night as Long as Life | Ночь длиною в жизнь | Nikolay Khomeriki | Drama, War. |
| 2010 | Russia | Connected by Time | Связь времён | Aleksey Kolmogorov | War. |
| 2010 | Russia | Sniper Sakha | Снайпер Саха | Nikita Arzhakov | Drama, War. |
| 2010 | Russia | I shall remember | Буду помнить | Vitaliy Vorobyov | Drama, War. |
| 2010 | Russia | No margin for error | Без права на ошибку | Alexander Vysokovsky | |
| 2010 | Russia | Sniper Duel | Смертельная схватка | Alexander Franskevich-Leie | War. |
| 2010 | Ukraine; Russia | Black Sheep | Паршиві вівці Паршивые овцы | Sergey Chekalov | Drama, War. |
| 2010 | Russia; Belarus | Fortress of War | Brestskaya krepost (Брестская крепость) | Alexander Kott | Action-drama. Soviet defense of Brest Fortress, June 1941 |
| 2010 | Russia | Burnt by the Sun 2 | Utomlyonnye solntsem 2 (Утомлённые солнцем 2) | Nikita Mikhalkov | Action-drama. Eastern Front |
| 2010 | Japan | Caterpillar | Kyatapirā (キャタピラー) | Kōji Wakamatsu | Drama. Wounded Japanese veteran of Sino-Japanese War returns home |
| 2010 | China | Death and Glory in Changde | Die Xue Gu Cheng (喋血孤城) | Dong Shen | Action-drama. Hunan's Battle of Changde |
| 2010 | United States | The Debt | | John Madden | Drama-Thriller. Capture of Nazi war criminal and Auschwitz-Birkenau surgeon wanted for concentration camp atrocities; remake of 2007 film |
| 2010 | China | East Wind Rain | Dong feng yu (东风雨) | Yunlong Liu | Drama. Shanghai-based espionage and attempts by various agencies to decode coded "weather forecasts" prior to Pearl Harbor attack |
| 2010 | Czech Republic; Germany; Austria | Habermann | Habermannův mlýn (in Czech) | Juraj Herz | Nazi occupation of Czechoslovakia |
| 2010 | Russia | Heaven is on Fire (The Sky is On Fire) (TV miniseries) | Nebo v ogne (Небо в огне) | Dmitry Cherkasov | Action-drama. Eastern Front Soviet pilots, 1939–1945 |
| 2010 | China | A Jewish Girl in Shanghai | You tai nu hai zai shang hai (猶太女孩在上海) | Wang Genfa, Zhang Zhenhui | Animated. Girl and little brother in Shanghai, with parents in Europe |
| 2010 | Poland | Joanna | Joanna | Feliks Falk | German occupation and Holocaust in Kraków, Poland |
| 2010 | United Kingdom | The King's Speech | | Tom Hooper | 2010 Best Picture depicting King George VI during the war |
| 2010 | Hong Kong; China | Legend of the Fist: The Return of Chen Zhen | Zing1 Mou5 Fung1 Wan4－Can4 Zan1 (精武風雲－陳真) (in Yue Chinese) | Andrew Lau Wai-Keung | Japanese invasion of Shanghai |
| 2010 | Russia | The Edge | Kray (Край) | Alexei Uchitel | Gulag camp shortly after the end of the war |
| 2010 | United States | The Pacific (TV miniseries) | | Tim Van Patten; David Nutter; Jeremy Podeswa; Graham Yost; Carl Franklin; Tony To | Action-drama. US 1st Marine Division in Pacific Theatre |
| 2010 | France; Germany; Hungary | The Round Up | La rafle (in French) | Roselyne Bosch | Vel' d'Hiv Roundup, the mass arrest of Jews by French police working for Nazi Germans in 1942 |
| 2010 | France | Sarah's Key (Her Name was Sarah) | Elle s'appelait Sarah | Kristin Scott Thomas | Vel' d'Hiv Roundup, the mass arrest of Jews by French police working for Nazi Germans in 1942 |
| 2010 | Australia | Sisters of War (TV) | | Brendan Maher | Australian nurses taken prisoner by the Japanese during the New Guinea campaign |
| 2010 | United States | Spoils of War | | Jean Liberté | Allied commandos masquerading as Germans parachute behind Austrian lines to kidnap SS officer/double-agent and destroy counterfeit money |
| 2010 | Canada | Storming Juno (TV) | | Tim Wolochatiuk | Docudrama. Regina Rifles and 1st Hussars at Juno Beach on D-Day |
| 2010 | Italy; Germany | Pius XII: Under the Roman Sky (TV) | Sotto il cielo di Roma (in Italian); Pius XII. (in German) | Christian Duguay | Pope Pius XII and Roman razzia |
| 2010 | Poland | Venice | Wenecja | Jan Jakub Kolski | German occupation of Poland, 1939–1945 |
| 2010 | United States | The Way Back | | Peter Weir | Prisoners and POWs escape Soviet Gulag |
| 2010 | Russia | Fog | Туман | Artyom Aksenenko; Ivan Shurkhovetskiy | Drama, Fantasy, War. |
| 2011 | Ukraine | Firecrosser | Той, хто пройшов крізь вогонь | Mykhailo Illienko | Adventure, Biography, Drama. Ivan Datsenko |
| 2011 | Russia | Far from war | Далеко от войны | Olga Muzaleva | Anti-tank dog |
| 2011 | Russia | Thirst | Жажда | Alexey Kolmogorov | |
| 2011 | Russia | Team Eight | Команда восемь | Alexander Aravin | |
| 2011 | Russia | SMERSH. A Legend for a Traitor | СМЕРШ. Легенда для предателя | Irina Gedrovich | History, War. |
| 2011 | Russia | Yalta-45 | Ялта-45 | Tigran Keosayan | Action, History, Mystery, War. |
| 2011 | Russia | Operation Gorgon | Операция «Горгона» | Vladimir Kott | |
| 2011 | Russia; Ukraine | Ballad about the Bomber | Баллада о бомбере | Vitaliy Vorobyov | Action, Drama, War. |
| 2011 | Russia | Summer of Wolves | Лето волков | Dmitriy Iosifov | Drama, Mystery, War. Ukrainian Insurgent Army |
| 2011 | Russia; Ukraine | The Hunt for Werewolf | Охота на Вервольфа | Evgeniy Mitrofanov | Action, Adventure, War. |
| 2011 | United Kingdom | Age of Heroes | | Adrian Vitoria | Action-Thriller. British No. 30 Commando unit from Battle of Dunkirk to neutral Norway |
| 2011 | Germany; Russia; Ukraine | 4 Days in May | Vier Tage im Mai | Achim von Borries | Group of Russian soldiers billeted in a German children's home near the end of the war |
| 2011 | Spain; Hungary | Angel of Budapest (TV miniseries) | El ángel de Budapest (in Spanish) | Luis Oliveros | Drama based on Diego Carcedo book. Spanish ambassador Ángel Sanz Briz rescues Jews in Budapest |
| 2011 | Germany | Auschwitz | | Uwe Boll | Drama |
| 2011 | Portugal | The Consul of Bordeaux | O Consul de Bordeus (in Portuguese) | João CorreaFrancisco Manso | The story of Aristides de Sousa Mendes, a man who issued 30,000 visas for safe passage to Portugal during WWII, in June 1940, defying the direct orders of his government. Among them were 10,000 Jews |
| 2011 | Brazil | Webseries: Heroes | Websérie: Herois | | Drama. Brazilian Expeditionary Force in Italy, 1944. |
| 2011 | Sweden | Beyond the Border | Gränsen | | |
| 2011 | India | Gandhi to Hitler (Dear Friend Hitler) | Priya Mitra Hitler (प्रिय मित्र हिटलर) | Rakesh Ranjan Kumar | Drama based on letters written by Mahatma Gandhi to Hitler |
| 2011 | Italy; Germany | General Della Rovere (TV miniseries) | Il generale Della Rovere (in Italian) | Carlo Carlei | Drama based on Indro Montanelli novel. Petty thief hired by Nazis to impersonate Italian resistance leader |
| 2011 | Austria; Hungary; Germany | In Another Lifetime | Vielleicht in einem anderen Leben | Elisabeth Scharang | Drama based on Peter Turrini play. Hungarian Jews marched to Mauthausen |
| 2011 | Poland; Germany; Canada | In Darkness | W ciemnosci (in Polish) | Agnieszka Holland | Drama. Leopold Socha's rescue of Jewish refugees in Nazi-occupied Lwów, Poland (now Lviv, Ukraine) |
| 2011 | Japan | Isoroku | Rengō Kantai Shirei Chōkan: Yamamoto Isoroku (聯合艦隊司令長官 山本五十六) | Izuru Narushima | Story of Admiral Isoroku Yamamoto |
| 2011 | Spain | Ispansi! | Ispansi (¡Españoles!) | Carlos Iglesias | Drama. Spanish war orphans in USSR in time for another war |
| 2011 | Philippines; Japan | Liberation | Liberacion | Adolfo Alix Jr. | Drama. Japanese holdout hiding in Philippine jungle for 20 years after war |
| 2011 | Czech Republic | Lidice | | Petr Nikolaev | Nazi occupation of Czechoslovakia and the destruction of the village of Lidice |
| 2011 | United States | Little Iron Men | | Jesse Kobayashi | Rescue of Lost Battalion by US Army 442nd Regimental Combat Team |
| 2011 | United Kingdom | The Lost Valentine | | Darnell Martin | Woman's quest for husband declared MIA |
| 2011 | South Korea | My Way | Maiwei (마이웨이) | Kang Je-gyu | Young Korean man conscripted into Japanese Imperial Army with service in Battles of Khalkhin Gol through Soviet Union and Germany |
| 2011 | Japan | Oba: The Last Samurai (Miracle of the Pacific: The Man Called Fox) | Taiheiyō no kiseki: Fox to yobareta otoko (太平洋の奇跡－フォックスと呼ばれた男) | Hideyuki Hirayama | Japanese holdout Sakae Ōba after Battle of Saipan, 1944 |
| 2011 | United Kingdom; Germany | The Sinking of the Laconia (TV miniseries) | | Uwe Janson | Drama. RMS Laconia incident |
| 2011 | Latvia | Three to Dance | Dancis pa trim | Arvīds Krievs | Drama. Tragedy of Latvian General Jānis Kurelis and independence-seeking Latvian Legionnaires sentenced to death for leaving SS |
| 2012 | Russia | Hispanic | Испанец | Aleksander Tsasuev | Romance, War. |
| 2012 | Ukraine | Angels of War | Ангелы войны | Tetiana Khodakivska | Drama. |
| 2012 | Russia | I serve the Soviet Union! | Служу Советскому Союзу! | Aleksandr Ustyugov | War. |
| 2012 | Russia | Spy | Шпион | Alexey Andrianov | Action, Drama, Thriller, War. |
| 2012 | Russia | Dugout | Блиндаж | Alexander Gornovsky | |
| 2012 | Russia | Match | Матч | Andrei Malyukov | Drama, History, Sport. The Death Match |
| 2012 | Russia | Snipers. Love in the Crosshairs | Снайперы: Любовь под прицелом | Zinoviy Royzman | Drama. |
| 2012 | Russia; Ukraine | Blood of War | Доставить любой ценой | Oleksandr Berezan | War. |
| 2012 | Russia | Last Stand | Последний бой | Ivan Shurkhovetskiy | War. Battle in Berlin |
| 2012 | Belarus | Sniper 2. Tungus | Снайпер 2. Тунгус | Oleg Fesenko | War. |
| 2012 | Russia | Three Days in the Life of Lt. Kravtsov | Три дня лейтенанта Кравцова | Aleksandr Daruga | Drama, War. |
| 2012 | Germany; Netherlands; Belarus; Russia; Latvia | In the Fog | В тумане | Sergei Loznitsa | Drama, History, War. |
| 2012 | Denmark | This Life | Hvidstens gruppen | Regner Grasten | Danish Resistance in Jutland |
| 2012 | Philippines | Corazon: The First Aswang | Corazon: Ang Unang Aswang | Richard V. Somes | Set in a Rural Barrio during Japanese Occupation of the Philippines |
| 2012 | China | Back to 1942 | Yī Jǐu Sì Èr (一九四二) | Feng Xiaogang | 1942 drought in China during war with Japan |
| 2012 | Netherlands | The Blitz | Het Bombardement | Ate de Jong | An aspiring amateur boxer in love with the daughter of German refuge amidst Rotterdam blitz, bombing on 14 May 1940 |
| 2012 | China; Hong Kong | The Flowers of War | Jin líng shí san chai (金陵十三钗) | Zhang Yimou | Rape of Nanjing by Japanese forces in China during 1937 |
| 2012 | Norway; Sweden | Into the White (Comrade) | | Petter Næss | Action-drama based on true story. Crashed German and English aircrew trying to survive Norwegian winter in wilderness, 1940 |
| 2012 | India/Japan | Imphal in the Japanese war | (Japanese: 日本の戦争でインパール, Meitei: Japan Landa Imphal | Chandam Shyamcharan Singh | Battle of Imphal between Allied and Japanese forces in Northeast India 1944 |
| 2012 | United Kingdom | Old Gold Times | Tempos Dourados | Edilberto Restino | Two lovers got separated by the WW2. 50 years later, by chance they found each other. Things started to get complicate for this new relationship, as they are not as sweet as they remembered each other. |
| 2012 | Australia; United Kingdom; Sweden | Lore | | Cate Shortland | Based loosely on the Rachel Seiffert novel The Dark Room, this film focused on five German siblings forced to flee to Hamburg once their Nazi-level parents are presumably killed in combat with the Allied forces |
| 2012 | United States | Red Tails | | Anthony Hemingway, George Lucas (uncredited) | Tuskegee Airmen and 332d Fighter Group of USAAF in European Theatre |
| 2012 | United States | Saints and Soldiers: Airborne Creed | | Ryan Little | US airborne forces in France after the 1944 Normandy Landings |
| 2012 | Russia | White Tiger | Belyy tigr (Белый тигр) | Karen Shakhnazarov | A Russian tank crew is ordered to take out a German Tiger tank in the new T-34-85 |
| 2012 | Russia | Fog 2 | Туман 2 | Ivan Shurkhovetsky | |
| 2013 | Ukraine | Haytarma | Qaytarma | Akhtem Seitablayev | Drama, History, War. Amet-khan Sultan, Deportation of the Crimean Tatars. |
| 2013 | Russia | Operation Typhoon | Задания особой важности. Операция «Тайфун» | Pyotr Amelin | Adventure, War. |
| 2013 | Ukraine; Russia; Kazakhstan | No right to choose | Без права на выбор | Leonid Belozorovich | Adventure, War. Qasim Qaysenov |
| 2013 | Russia | Spies Must Die. Snake in the Grass | Смерть шпионам. Скрытый враг | Eduard Pal'mov | War. |
| 2013 | Russia | Spies Must Die: The Fox Hole | Смерть шпионам: Лисья нора | Aleksandr Daruga | Action, War. |
| 2013 | Russia | Spies Must Die: Blast Wave | Смерть шпионам. Ударная волна | Aleksandr Daruga | Action. |
| 2013 | Russia | Greetings from Katyusha | Привет от Катюши | Konstantin Statskiy | Drama, War. |
| 2013 | Russia | I see the goal | Цель вижу | Evgeniy Sokurov | Drama, War. Central Women's Sniper Training School |
| 2013 | United States | The Book Thief | | Brian Percival | The fictional story of young Liesel Meminger. After she finds her first book beside her brother's graveside, she is sent to foster parents. While in the comfort of her new found parents, World War II breaks out and her foster parents shelter a Jewish refugee |
| 2013 | Poland; Lithuania | 1939 Battle of Westerplatte | Tajemnica Westerplatte | Pawel Chochlew | 1 September 1939. German battleship Schleswig-Holstein marks the start of World War II by firing on the garrison stationed at the Westerplatte peninsula in Poland |
| 2013 | Philippines | Death March | Death March | Adolfo Alix, Jr. | Bataan Death March |
| 2013 | United States | Emperor | | Peter Webber | General Douglas MacArthur begins an investigation of the role of Emperor Shōwa in the war, including the attack on Pearl Harbor |
| 2013 | Australia; United Kingdom | The Railway Man | | Jonathan Teplitzky | Drama based on true story of Eric Lomax. Victim from Burmese Death Railway setting out to find those responsible for his torture |
| 2013 | Portugal; Brazil; Italy | Road 47 | A Estrada 47 | Vicente Ferraz | Brazilian Expeditionary Force in Italy |
| 2013 | Russia | Stalingrad | Stalingrad (Сталинград) | Fyodor Bondarchuk | Battle of Stalingrad |
| 2013 | Japan | The Wind Rises | Kaze Tachinu (風立ちぬ) | Hayao Miyazaki | Animated historical drama animated by Studio Ghibli. Fictionalized biopic of Jiro Horikoshi, designer of the Mitsubishi A5M fighter aircraft |
| 2014 | Russia | White Night | Белая ночь | Aleksandr Yakimchuk | Crime, Drama, History, Mystery, War. |
| 2014 | United States; Russia | Leningrad | Ленинград | Igor Vishnevetsky | Drama, History, War. Siege of Leningrad |
| 2014 | Russia | Old gun | Старое ружьё | Kirill Belevich | Action, Drama, War. |
| 2014 | Ukraine | On the razor's edge | По лезвию бритвы | Sergey Kozhevnikov | Drama. Nikolai Kuznetsov |
| 2014 | Russia | Don't leave me | Не покидай меня | Alexander Franskevich-Leie | War. |
| 2014 | Russia | Ladoga | Ладога | Alexander Veledinsky | Drama, War. Road of Life, Siege of Leningrad |
| 2014 | Russia | The Translator | Переводчик | Andrey Proshkin | War. |
| 2014 | China | Norjmaa | | Bayin | Drama, History, War. |
| 2014 | Canada | Bomb Girls: Facing the Enemy (TV movies of Bomb Girls) | | Jerry Ciccoritti | Canadian home front and Battle of the St. Lawrence |
| 2014 | Hungary | Dear Elza! | Drága Elza! | Zoltán Füle | A Hungarian soldier is captured by the Russians and made a mine trampler |
| 2014 | France; Germany | Diplomacy | Diplomatie | Volker Schlöndorff | The Swedish diplomat Raoul Nordling persuades gen. Dietrich von Choltitz to avoid the destruction of Paris |
| 2014 | United States | Fury | | David Ayer | Allied final offensive in Germany from the perspective of a US tank crew of the 2nd Armored Division, April 1945 |
| 2014 | Japan | Giovanni's Island | Joban'ni no Shima (ジョバンニの島) | Mizuho Nishikubo | Anime. Soviet invasion of the Kuril Islands in 1945 and expulsion of the Japanese population |
| 2014 | Italy | Head High. The Martyrs of Fiesole (TV) | A testa alta - I martiri di Fiesole | Maurizio Zaccaro | Carabinieri's sacrifice to avoid a German reprisal on civilians in Fiesole |
| 2014 | United States | The Imitation Game | | Morten Tyldum | Alan Turing decoding German cyphers at Bletchley Park |
| 2014 | India/Japan/U.K | Imphal 1944 | Japanese: 1944年インパール | Junichi Kajioka | Battle of Imphal, China Burma India Theater |
| 2014 | Italy | Italia's Secret^{†} | Il segreto di Italia | Antonello Bellucco | Massacre of Codevigo, 1945 of Italians who supported the occupying Germans, by partisan troops at the end of the war |
| 2014 | United States | The Monuments Men | | George Clooney | Allied platoon made up of seven museum directors, curators, and art historians, tasked with going into Germany in the closing stages of World War II to rescue artworks requisitioned by the Nazis and returning them to their rightful owners |
| 2014 | Australia | Parer's War (TV movie) | | Alister Grierson | Story of Australian wartime cameraman Damien Parer |
| 2014 | United States | Saints and Soldiers: The Void | | Ryan Little | A fateful mission through the Harz Mountains of Germany |
| 2014 | Poland | Stones for the Rampart | | Robert Glinski | Three Warsaw friends, whose plans for the future are interrupted by the life-changing advent of the Second World War in Poland. |
| 2014 | United Kingdom; France; Belgium | Suite Française | Suite Française (in French) | Saul Dibb | Romance between a French villager and a German officer during the German occupation of France |
| 2014 | United States | Unbroken | | Angelina Jolie | Based on true life of US Olympic athlete Louis Zamperini, who survives a plane crash and ends up in a Japanese POW camp |
| 2014 | United States | Walking with the Enemy | | Mark Schmidt | A young man (Elek Cohen) disguises himself as a Nazi SS Officer |
| 2014 | Poland | Warsaw 44 | Miasto 44 | Jan Komasa | Warsaw Uprising 1944. |

=== 2015–2019 ===
| Year | Country | Main title (Alternative titles) | Original title (Original script) | Director | Battles, campaigns, events depicted |
|---|---|---|---|---|---|
| 2015 | Russia | The Forbiddance | Запрет | Aleksey Kozlov | Drama, History, War. |
| 2015 | Russia | In the distant forty-fifth… Meetings on the Elbe | В далёком сорок пятом… Встречи на Эльбе | Mira Todorovskaya | Drama. |
| 2015 | Russia | Our | Наши | Rishat Nafikov | |
| 2015 | Russia | Uppercut for Hitler | Апперкот для Гитлера | Denis Neimand | Drama, War. Igor Miklashevsky |
| 2015 | Kazakhstan | Order to return alive | Приказ вернуться живым | Alexey Gorlov | |
| 2015 | Russia | Lieutenant | Лейтенант | Eugene Epstein | |
| 2015 | Azerbaijan; Belarus | Incomplete Memories | Yarımçıq xatirələr | Elkhan Jafarov | Biography, Drama, History, War. Defense of Brest Fortress |
| 2015 | Russia | Attackers. The Last Fight. | Истребители: Последний бой | Zinoviy Royzman | War. |
| 2015 | Russia | The Medal | Орден | Aleksey Bystritskiy | War. Soviet invasion of Manchuria |
| 2015 | Russia | The Last Frontier | Последний рубеж | Sergey Krasnov | Panfilov's Twenty-Eight Guardsmen, Battle of Moscow |
| 2015 | Russia | Snow and Ashes | Снег и пепел | Alexander Kiriyenko | War. |
| 2015 | Belarus | Sniper. The Last Shot | Снайпер. Последний выстрел | Arman Gevorgyan | War. |
| 2015 | Russia | 72 Hours | 72 часа | Kira Angelina | Drama, War. |
| 2015 | Russia | Battery Number One | Единичка | Kirill Belevich | Drama, War. |
| 2015 | Russia | On the Road to Berlin | Дорога на Берлин | Sergei Popov | Drama, War. |
| 2015 | Denmark | 9. April | | Roni Ezra | Danish bicycle infantry sent as vanguard to slow down the German invasion until reinforcements can arrive |
| 2015 | Estonia | 1944 | 1944 | Elmo Nüganen | Battle of Tannenberg Line between German and Soviet forces |
| 2015 | Russia; Ukraine | Battle for Sevastopol | Bitva za Sevastopol (Битва за Севастополь) | Sergey Mokritskiy | A biographical film about the life path of the Soviet sniper Lyudmila Pavlichenko |
| 2015 | Russia | The Dawns Here Are Quiet | А зори здесь тихие | Renat Davletyarov | A young Russian anti-aircraft crew confronts experienced Nazi saboteurs |
| 2015 | India | Detective Byomkesh Bakshy! | Detective Byomkesh Bakshy!! (डिटेक्टिव ब्योमकेश बक्शी!) | Dibakar Banerjee | Detective thriller film set around the events of the Japanese bombing of Calcutta. |
| 2015 | Japan | The Emperor in August | Nihon no ichiban nagai hi (日本のいちばん長い日) | Masato Harada | Imperial Japanese leadership in the final few months of the war |
| 2015 | Philippines | Felix Manalo | Felix Manalo | Joel Lamangan | Biography of Felix Manalo during Japanese Occupation of the Philippines |
| 2015 | India | Kanche | | Krish | A rivalry between two men, based on caste and social status, extends from an Indian village onto war torn Europe during WW2 |
| 2015 | China | Hundred Regiments Offensive | Bǎi tuán dà zhàn (百團大戰) | Ning Haiqiang, Zhang Yuzhong | Peng Dehuai and Zuo Quan during the Hundred Regiments Offensive |
| 2015 | Denmark | Land of Mine | Under sandet | Martin P. Zandvliet | German POWs in Denmark at the end of the war |
| 2015 | United States; Mexico | Little Boy | | Alejandro Monteverde | Comedy-drama about a young American boy attempting to reunite with his father serving in the Pacific Theater any way possible. |
| 2015 | Japan/India/Thailand | My Japanese Niece | Meitei: Eigi Japangi Imou; Japanese: マイ・ジャパニーズ・ニース | Mohen Naorem (Manipuri), Fanny Fandora (French), Sheria Vallah (Iranian), Deepsikha Poddav (Bengali), Robert Megha (Manipuri) | Reminiscences of a Japanese girl at Manipur, India from the period of China Burma India Theater. |
| 2015 | Hungary | Son of Saul | Saul fia | László Nemes | A day-and-a-half in the life of Saul Ausländer, a Hungarian member of the Sonderkommando in the Auschwitz concentration camp |
| 2015 | United States | War Pigs | | Ryan Little | A US Army rag tag unit of misfits behind German lines |
| 2016 | Ukraine | Century of Jacob | Століття Якова | Bata Nedic | Drama, History. |
| 2016 | Kazakhstan; Belarus | The Road to Mother | Анаға апарар жол | Akan Satayev | Drama, History, War. |
| 2016 | Russia | Yakov. Son of Stalin | Яков. Сын Сталина | Alexey A. Petrukhin | Yakov Dzhugashvili |
| 2016 | Russia; Germany | Paradise | Рай | Andrei Konchalovsky | Drama, War. |
| 2016 | Russia | I Am a Teacher | Я - Учитель | Sergey Mokritskiy | Drama, History, War. |
| 2016 | Russia; Belarus | Tankman | Танкист | Aleksandr Efremov | Drama. Zinoviy Kolobanov |
| 2016 | Russia | In the fall of '41 | Осенью 41-го | Elena Borisova | Drama, War. |
| 2016 | Russia | Panfilov's 28 Men | 28 panfilovtsev (28 панфиловцев) | Kim Druzhinin, Andrey Shalopa | Drama about the act of bravery of a group of Soviet soldiers from the Panfilov's Twenty-Eight Guardsmen, Battle of Moscow |
| 2016 | United States | Allied | | Robert Zemeckis | Romantic espionage thriller about relationship between a Canadian airforce intelligence officer and a female French Resistance fighter |
| 2016 | United Kingdom; France; Czech Republic | Anthropoid | | Sean Ellis | Operation Anthropoid to assassinate senior SS officer Reinhard Heydrich |
| 2016 | United Kingdom | Dad's Army | | Oliver Parker | Comedy about elderly members of the British Home Guard in coastal England |
| 2016 | Norway; Sweden; Denmark; Ireland | The King's Choice | Kongens nei | Erik Poppe | King Haakon VII and the Norwegian royal family before and after the German invasion of Norway |
| 2016 | France; Belgium | Fanny's Journey | Le Voyage de Fanny | Lola Doillon | Œuvre de secours aux enfants, Jewish children fleeing France for Switzerland |
| 2016 | United States | Hacksaw Ridge | | Mel Gibson | Historical drama about Desmond Doss, an American pacifist combat medic who became the only conscientious objector to be awarded the Medal of Honor in World War II |
| 2016 | Italy | My Honor Was Loyalty | Onore e lealtà | Alessandro Pepe | Fictionalized account of the SS Leibstandarte |
| 2016 | Canada; France; Germany | Race | | Stephen Hopkins | Biographical sports drama film about African-American athlete Jesse Owens, who won a record-breaking four gold medals at the 1936 Berlin Olympic Games in Nazi Germany |
| 2016 | China | Railroad Tigers | Tiědào fēi hǔ (铁道飞虎) | Ding Sheng | Comedy-drama. A group of Chinese train engineers attempt to blow up a Japanese military railway during the Sino-Japanese war |
| 2016 | United Kingdom | Their Finest | | Lone Scherfig | The story of a British Ministry of Information film team making a morale-boosting film about the Dunkirk evacuation during the Battle of Britain and the London Blitz |
| 2016 | Japan | In This Corner of the World | Kono Sekai no Katasumi ni (この世界の片隅に) | Sunao Katabuchi | Animated drama based on real facts. A young Japanese woman has to endure the bombings of Kure and the aftermath the atomic bombing of Hiroshima |
| 2016 | Philippines; Japan | Tomodachi | | Joel Lamangan | A Japanese merchant residing in the Philippines suddenly conscripted in Imperial Japanese Army during Pre-Pacific War |
| 2016 | United States | USS Indianapolis: Men of Courage | | Mario Van Peebles | The USS Indianapolis, torpedoed and sunk by the Japanese in 1945 |
| 2016 | Poland | Volhynia | Wołyń | Wojciech Smarzowski | Massacres of Poles in Volhynia and extermination of Jews |
| 2016 | Italy | At War with Love | In guerra per amore | Pierfrancesco Diliberto | Comedy-drama. Italo-American soldier takes part to the Invasion of Sicily |
| 2016 | Latvia | The Chronicles of Melanie | Melanijas hronika | Viesturs Kairišs | Real story of survival of a mother and son from Russian gulags of Siberia |
| 2017 | United Kingdom | Churchill | | Jonathan Teplitzky | Winston Churchill awaits the 1944 Normandy landings, which he believes will be a disaster. |
| 2017 | Russia | Was. Is. Will be. | Было. Есть. Будет | Egor Grammatikov | |
| 2017 | Russia | On the threshold of love | На пороге любви | Vitaliy Babenko | Drama, Romance, War. |
| 2017 | Russia | Through the Fog | Сквозь туман | Maksim Schastnyev | Drama, War. |
| 2017 | Russia; Lithuania | Baltic Tango | Холодное танго | Pavel Chukhray | Drama, History, War. |
| 2017 | Russia; Belarus | Sniper. SMERSH officer | Снайпер. Офицер СМЕРШ | Aleksey Muradov | War, Drama. |
| 2017 | Russia | Three Days Till the Spring | Три дня до весны | Aleksandr Kasatkin | Action, Crime, Drama, War. Siege of Leningrad |
| 2017 | Belarus | Shadow of the Enemy | Тень врага | Igor Senkov | War. |
| 2017 | Spain | The Chessplayer | El jugador de ajedrez | Luis Oliveros | Diego wins the Spanish Championship of Chess in 1934. Later, in France, Diego will be accused of spying by the Nazis and imprisoned in an SS prison |
| 2017 | China | The Chinese Widow | 烽火芳菲 | Bille August | Chinese war drama. Air raid by the United States on the Japanese capital Tokyo and other places like Honshu carried out by Doolittle Raid. |
| 2017 | United Kingdom; United States | Darkest Hour | | Joe Wright | Account of the early days of Winston Churchill as Prime Minister while Nazi Germany's Wehrmacht swept across Western Europe |
| 2017 | United Kingdom; United States; France; Netherlands | Dunkirk | | Christopher Nolan | Evacuation of Allied soldiers, who were cut off and surrounded by the German army from the beaches and harbour of Dunkirk, France, between 27 May & 4 June 1940, during the Battle of France in World War II |
| 2017 | United Kingdom | Goodbye Christopher Robin | | Simon Curtis(filmmaker) | In the movie, the character's sensitivities are presented as a direct result of the war, with him flinching at the sounds of corks and balloons going pop. The movie is based on Ann Thwaite's 1990 biography A. A. Milne: The Man Behind Winnie-the-Pooh. |
| 2017 | France; Belgium | The Man with the Iron Heart | | Cédric Jimenez | Based on French writer Laurent Binet's novel HHhH, and focuses on Operation Anthropoid, the assassination of Nazi leader Reinhard Heydrich in Prague during World War II |
| 2017 | India | Raag Desh (Love the Country^{†}) | Raag Desh (राग देश) | Tigmanshu Dhulia | Drama based on the Indian National Army and the Red Fort Trials |
| 2017 | India | Rangoon | Rangoon (रंगून) | Vishal Bhardwaj | Drama based on Burma Campaign and India's war for Independence |
| 2017 | Finland | The Unknown Soldier | Tuntematon sotilas | Aku Louhimies | Drama based on the 1954 Finnish classic novel of the same name by Väinö Linna, that follows a machine gun company of the Finnish Army during the Continuation War |
| 2017 | Norway | The 12th Man | Den 12. mann | Harald Zwart | Action-drama. They were 12 saboteurs. The Nazis killed 11 of them. This is the true story of the one who got away... |
| 2017 | Germany | The Captain | Der Hauptmann | Robert Schwentke | In the last moments of World War II, a young German soldier fighting for survival finds a Nazi captain's uniform. Impersonating an officer, the man quickly takes on the monstrous identity of the perpetrators he's escaping from. |
| 2017 | United States; United Kingdom; Czech Republic | The Zookeeper's Wife | | Niki Caro | The film tells the true story of how Jan and Antonina Żabiński rescued hundreds of Polish Jews from the Germans by hiding them in their Warsaw Zoo during World War II. |
| 2018 | Russia | To Paris | На Париж | Sergey Sarkisov | Adventure, History. |
| 2018 | Uzbekistan | Berlin — Akkurgan | Berlin — Oqqoʻrgʻon; Берлин — Аккурган | Zulfiqor Musoqov | History, War. |
| 2018 | Russia | Zoya Kosmodemyanskaya | Зоя Космодемьянская | Olga Tovma | Drama, War. Zoya Kosmodemyanskaya |
| 2018 | Russia | Black Pea Coats | Чёрные бушлаты | Vitaly Vorobyov | War. |
| 2018 | Ukraine | One man is a warrior in the field | Один в поле воин | Vitaly Vashchenko | |
| 2018 | Russia; Belarus; Czech Republic; France; Poland; Israel; Ukraine | Witnesses | | Konstantin Fam | Drama, History, War. |
| 2018 | Russia | Frontier | Рубеж | Dmitriy Tyurin | Action, Drama, Fantasy, History, Romance, War. Nevsky Pyatachok, Operation Iskra, Siege of Leningrad |
| 2018 | Russia | Never Say Goodbye | Прощаться не будем | Pavel Drozdov | Drama, War. Defense of Kalinin |
| 2018 | Russia | Seven pairs of unclean | Семь пар нечистых | Kirill Belevich; Yuriy Ilin | Action, Adventure, Drama, War. |
| 2018 | Russia | Anna's War | Война Анны | Aleksey Fedorchenko | Drama, War. |
| 2018 | Lithuania | Ashes in the Snow | | Marius A. Markevicius | Drama, History, Romance, War. |
| 2018 | China | Air Strike (Unbreakable Spirit) | Dà Hōngzhà (大轰炸) | Xiao Feng | Set in 1943 during the World War II, the story revolves around the Japanese bombing of Chongqing, which started in 1938. |
| 2018 | United Kingdom | The Guernsey Literary and Potato Peel Pie Society | | Mike Newell | Romance/Drama based on novel by Mary Ann Shaffer and Annie Barrows. Writer forms unexpected bond with Guernsey island residents in aftermath of war and writes a book about their wartime experiences |
| 2018 | Poland; United Kingdom | Hurricane (Hurricane: 303 Squadron, Mission of Honor) | 303: Bitwa o Anglię (in Polish) | David Blair | A group of Polish pilots of 303 Squadron in the Battle of Britain |
| 2018 | Poland | 303 Squadron | Dywizjon 303. Historia prawdziwa | Jerzy Skolimowski | Action-adventure based on Arkady Fiedler novel. Exploits of Polish pilots of RAF's 303 Squadron during Battle of Britain |
| 2018 | Italy | Red Land | Rosso Istria | Maximiliano Hernando Bruno | Foibe massacres by Tito's partisans in the autumn of 1943 |
| 2018 | Russia | Sobibor | Собибор | Konstantin Khabensky | Nazi Sobibor extermination camp in Poland, Alexander Pechersky |
| 2018 | Russia | Tankers | Несокрушимый | Konstantin Maksimov | The film is based on the true story of the crew of a Soviet KV-1 tank, which took part in an unequal battle on 13 July 1942 and destroyed 16 tanks, two armored vehicles and eight other vehicles from enemy forces in the Tarasovsky District, Rostov Oblast. Semyon Vasilyevich Konovalov |
| 2018 | Russia | Axe | Топор | Vladimir Semenovykh | Drama. The Siberian hermit, whose whole life was destroyed by the millstones of the Great October Revolution and the Civil War, spends 17 years in exile. When the news of the attack of fascist Germany on the USSR reached him, the former Cossack officer rushes to the battlefield to protect his native land. |
| 2018 | France | To the Ends of the World | Les Confins du Monde | Guillaume Nicloux | A French soldier hunting a Việt Minh officer in a personal vendetta amidst the ongoing Japanese coup d'état in French Indochina |
| 2019 | Russia; United States | One Man Dies a Million Times | | Jessica Oreck | Drama, History. Siege of Leningrad |
| 2019 | Russia | Felt novel | Фетровый роман | Maxim Schastnev | |
| 2019 | Russia | Consequences of the war | Последствия войны | | |
| 2019 | Russia | Holiday | Праздник | Alexey Krasovsky | Comedy. Siege of Leningrad |
| 2019 | Russia; Belarus; Israel | Kaddish | Кадиш | Konstantin Fam | Drama, History, War. |
| 2019 | Ukraine | Last Stand | Последний бой | Vitaly Vashchenko | Romance. T-34 |
| 2019 | Russia | Subject to destruction | Подлежит уничтожению | Vitaly Vashchenko | Drama, Thriller, War. |
| 2019 | Russia | Saving the Motherland 321-ya Sibirskaya | 321-я Сибирская | Solbon Lygdenov | Action, Drama, History, War. 321st Rifle Division, Battle of Stalingrad |
| 2019 | Russia | Vesuri | Весури | Aleksandr Yakimchuk | Drama, War. East Karelian concentration camps |
| 2019 | Russia | Secret Weapon | Приказ «Уничтожить» | Konstantin Statskiy | War. |
| 2019 | Russia | The Cry of Silence | Крик тишины | Vladimir Potapov | Drama, War. Siege of Leningrad |
| 2019 | Russia | My Little Sister | Сестрёнка; Һеңлекәш | Aleksandr Galibin | Drama, Family, War. |
| 2019 | Russia | Convoy 48. The war train. | Коридор бессмертия | Fedor Popov | Drama, War. Road to Victory, Siege of Leningrad |
| 2019 | Russia | Saving Leningrad | Спасти Ленинград | Aleksey Kozlov | Action, Drama, War. Barge No. 752, Siege of Leningrad |
| 2019 | Russia | Rzhev | Ржев | Igor Kopylov | Drama, History, War. Battles of Rzhev |
| 2019 | Russia | T-34 | Т-34 | Alexey Sidorov | A Soviet tank commander gets captured by the Germans |
| 2019 | Russia | Tanki | Танки | Kim Druzhinin | The film is set in the period 1939 - 1940 . The film tells a kind (but not having anything to do with the actual events) adventure story of a secret run on prototypes of the T-34 tank by designer Mikhail Koshkin along the Kharkov - Moscow route in order to approve the production of new combat vehicles, which later helped the Soviet Union to win the Great Patriotic War ... |
| 2019 | Russia | Soldier Boy | Солдатик | Viktoria Fanasiutina | An orphaned six-year-old boy is rescued by an army regiment where he distinguishes himself by numerous heroic acts. Sergei Aleshkov |
| 2019 | Poland | The Messenger | Kurier | Władysław Pasikowski | Film about the lead up to the Polish uprising against German occupation at the end of the Second World War. |
| 2019 | United States | Midway | | Roland Emmerich | Battle of Midway between US & Japanese navies |
| 2019 | United States | Jojo Rabbit | | Taika Waititi | Comedy-drama film about a 10-year-old boy, brainwashed by the Nazi regime, but who then questions his beliefs after interacting with a Jewish girl hidden by his mother in their house |

== 2020s ==
=== 2020–2024 ===
| Year | Country | Main title (Alternative titles) | Original title (Original script) | Director | Battles, campaigns, events depicted | Ref. |
|---|---|---|---|---|---|---|
| 2020 | Denmark | Into the Darkness | De forbandede år | Anders Refn | German invasion of Denmark; Battle of Stalingrad | |
| 2020 | Latvia | The Sign Painter | Pilsēta pie upes | Viestur Kairish | Soviet–Nazi–Soviet occupation of Latvia | |
| 2020 | Norway | The Crossing | Flukten over grensen | Johanne Helgeland | Nazi occupation of Norway; The Holocaust in Norway | |
| 2020 | Russia; Germany; Belarus | Persian Lessons | Persischstunden; Уроки фарси | Vadim Perelman | The Holocaust | |
| 2020 | Russia | AK-47 | Калашников | Konstantin Buslov | Biopic of Mikhail Kalashnikov | |
| 2020 | France | De Gaulle | | Gabriel Le Bomin | Battle of France | |
| 2020 | United States; United Kingdom; Germany | Resistance | | Jonathan Jakubowicz | Biopic of Marcel Marceau | |
| 2020 | Portugal; Spain | The Spy | A Espia | Jorge Paixão da Costa; Edgar Pêra; João Maia | Portugal during World War II | |
| 2020 | Russia | Saboteur 3: Crimea | Диверсант 3: Крым | Dmitriy Iosifov | Crimean campaign | |
| 2020 | Japan | Wife of a Spy | スパイの妻 | Kiyoshi Kurosawa | State General Mobilization Law; Unit 731 | |
| 2020 | United States | Greyhound | | Aaron Schneider | Battle of the Atlantic | |
| 2020 | United Kingdom | Summerland | | Jessica Swale | Battle of Britain; London Blitz | |
| 2020 | China | The Eight Hundred | 八佰 | Guan Hu | Defense of Sihang Warehouse; Battle of Shanghai | |
| 2020 | Russia | The Red Ghost | Красный призрак | Andrey Bogatyrev | Vyazemsky operation | |
| 2020 | United Kingdom | Six Minutes to Midnight | | Andy Goddard | British declaration of war on Germany | |
| 2020 | Russia | A Siege Diary | Блокадный дневник | Andrey Zaytsev | Siege of Leningrad | |
| 2020 | Russia | The Last Frontier | Подольские курсанты | Vadim Shmelyov | Battle of Moscow | |
| 2020 | United States | The Liberator | | Greg Jonkajtys | Italian campaign Liberation of Dachau | |
| 2020 | Poland | The Champion | Mistrz | Maciej Barczewski | Biopic of Tadeusz Pietrzykowski | |
| 2020 | Russia | Zoya | Зоя | Maksim Brius; Leonid Plyaskin | Biopic of Zoya Kosmodemyanskaya | |
| 2020 | Netherlands | The Forgotten Battle | De Slag om de Schelde | Matthijs van Heijningen Jr. | Battle of the Scheldt | |
| 2020 | Norway | Betrayed | Den største forbrytelsen | Eirik Svensson | Operation Weserübung; The Holocaust in Norway | |
| 2021 | Hungary; Latvia; France; Germany | Natural Light | Természetes fény | Dénes Nagy | Operation Little Saturn | |
| 2021 | Russia | V2. Escape from Hell | Девятаев | Timur Bekmambetov; Sergei Trofimov | Biopic of Mikhail Devyatayev | |
| 2021 | Russia; Belarus | The Fate of a Saboteur | Судьба диверсанта | Dmitry Astrakhan | Osipovichi railway sabotage | |
| 2021 | Russia | Siberian Sniper | Рядовой Чээрин | Dmitry Koltsov | The Eastern Front 1943 | |
| 2021 | United States | American Traitor: The Trial of Axis Sally | | Michael Polish | Biopic of Mildred Gillars | |
| 2021 | United States; Croatia | The Match | | Dominik Sedar; Jakov Sedlar | The Death Match | |
| 2021 | Ukraine; Georgia | Why am I Alive | Чому я живий? | Villen Novak | Reichskommissariat Ukraine | |
| 2021 | Canada; Belgium; France | Charlotte | | Biopic of Charlotte Salomon | | |
| 2021 | Russia | Saving Pushkin | Учёности плоды | Igor Ugolnikov | Looting of Mikhaylovskoye Museum Reserve | |
| 2021 | Russia | Cold Gold | Холодное золото | Potr Khiki | Banditry in Siberia during World War II | |
| 2021 | Russia | The Seventh Symphony | Седьмая симфония | Alexander Kott | Siege of Leningrad | |
| 2021 | United Kingdom; United States | Operation Mincemeat | | John Madden | Operation Mincemeat | |
| 2021 | Greece | Echoes of the Past | Kalavryta 1943 | Nicholas Dimitropoulos | Massacre of Kalavryta | |
| 2021 | Russia | The Pilot. A Battle for Survival | Лётчик | Renat Davletyarov | Biopic of Russian pilot Aleksey Maresyev | |
| 2021 | Russia | Maria. Save Moscow | Мария. Спасти Москву | Vera Storozheva | Battle of Moscow | |
| 2022 | United States | Burning at Both Ends | Resistance 1942 | Matthew Hill; Landon Johnson | Nazi occupation of France | |
| 2022 | France | Farewell, Mr. Haffmann | Adieu monsieur Haffmann | Fred Cavayé | Nazi occupation of Paris | |
| 2022 | Russia | First Oscar | Первый Оскар | Sergey Mokritskiy | Battle of Moscow | |
| 2022 | Russia | Return From the Front | Возвращение с фронта | Nikolay Gadomsky | Great Patriotic War | |
| 2022 | Russia | 1941. Wings Over Berlin | 1941. Крылья над Берлином | Konstantin Buslov | Bombing of Berlin by Soviet aircraft in 1941 | |
| 2022 | Kazakhstan | Summer of 1941 | Лето 1941 года 1941 жылдың жазы | Bekbolat Shekerov | Biopic of Adi Sharipov | |
| 2022 | Russia | Africa | Африка | Darya Binevskaya | Siege of Leningrad | |
| 2022 | Norway | War Sailor | Krigsseileren | Gunnar Vikene | Allied convoys in the Battle of the Atlantic | |
| 2022 | Ukraine; France | Shttl | Шттл | Ady Walter | Operation Barbarossa | |
| 2022 | Norway | Gold Run | Gulltransporten | Hallvard Bræin | Flight of the Norwegian National Treasury | |
| 2022 | Norway | Narvik | Kampen om Narvik | Erik Skjoldbjaerg | Battles of Narvik | |
| 2023 | Russia | The Righteous | Праведник | Sergei Ursuliak | Biopic of Nikolay Kiselyov | |
| 2023 | Russia | Nuremberg | Нюрнберг | Nikolai Lebedev | Nuremberg trials | |
| 2023 | Russia | Clemency | Помилование | Ainur Askarov | Battle of Stalingrad | |
| 2023 | Russia | Spreading the wings | Расправляя крылья | Olga Muzaleva | 586th Fighter Aviation Regiment | |
| 2023 | Uzbekistan | Uzbek girl | Oʻzbek qizi Узбечка | Akbar Bekturdiyev | Biopic of Soviet sniper Ziba Ganiyeva | |
| 2023 | United Kingdom; Poland; United States | The Zone of Interest | | Jonathan Glazer | Biopic of Rudolf Höss; Zone of Interest | |
| 2023 | United States; United Kingdom | Oppenheimer | | Christopher Nolan | Biopic of J. Robert Oppenheimer | |
| 2023 | Italy | Comandante | | Edoardo De Angelis | Italian submarine Comandante Cappellini in the Battle of the Atlantic | |
| 2023 | France | The Last Men | Les Derniers Hommes | David Oelhoffen | Japanese coup d'état in French Indochina | |
| 2023 | United Kingdom; Czech Republic; Australia; United States | One Life | | James Hawes | Biopic of Nicholas Winton; Kindertransport | |
| 2023 | Belgium; Netherlands; Poland | Wil | | Tim Mielants | German occupation of Belgium during World War II; Feldgendarmerie | |
| 2023 | Russia | Air | Воздух | Aleksei Alekseivich German | Siege of Leningrad | |
| 2023 | Norway | The Arctic Convoy | Konvoi | Henrik Martin Dahlsbakken | Convoy PQ 17, one of the Arctic convoys of World War II | |
| 2024 | United States | Masters of the Air | | Cary Joji Fukunaga; Dee Rees; Anna Boden; Ryan Fleck; Tim Van Patten | 100th Bomb Group | |
| 2024 | United States | Escape from Germany | | T. C. Christensen | WWII Missionary Evacuation | |
| 2024 | United Kingdom; United States | The Ministry of Ungentlemanly Warfare | | Guy Ritchie | Operation Postmaster | |
| 2024 | United States; United Kingdom | Blitz | | Steve McQueen | The Blitz | |
| 2024 | United States; Belgium; Ireland | Bonhoeffer | | Todd Komarnicki | Biopic of anti-Nazi dissident Dietrich Bonhoeffer | |
| 2024 | United States | The Six Triple Eight | | Tyler Perry | 6888th Central Postal Directory Battalion | |

=== 2025–2029 ===
| Year | Country | Main title (Alternative titles) | Original title (Original script) | Director | Battles, campaigns, events depicted | Ref. |
|---|---|---|---|---|---|---|
| 2025 | United States; United Kingdom; Bulgaria; Israel | The World Will Tremble | | Lior Geller | Story of the attempt by Michael Podchlebnik and Szlama Ber Winer to escape the Chełmno extermination camp | |
| 2025 | United States; Philippines | Prisoner of War | Death March | Louis Mandylor | Battle of Bataan | |
| 2025 | Russia | Blood Type | Группа крови | Maksim Brius | Nazi concentration camps in the Leningrad region in 1943 | |
| 2025 | Uzbekistan | Kazbek | Osiyo arsloni Казбек | Akbar Bekturdiyev | Biopic of Mamadali Topivoldiyev | |
| 2025 | Germany | Amrum | | Fatih Akin | Biopic of Hark Bohm's wartime childhood | |
| 2025 | United States | Black Panthers of WWII | | Michael Phillip Edwards | Story of the 761st Tank Battalion | |
| 2025 | China | Dongji Rescue | 东极岛 | Guan Hu; Fei Zhenxiang | Lisbon Maru incident | |
| 2025 | Norway | The Battle of Oslo | Blücher | Daniel Fahre | Battle of Drøbak Sound | |
| 2025 | United States | Nuremberg | | James Vanderbilt | Based on the 2013 non-fiction book The Nazi and the Psychiatrist by Jack El-Hai | |
| 2025 | United States; Poland | Triumph of the Heart | | Anthony D'Ambrosio | Story of Maximilian Kolbe's final days in Auschwitz concentration camp | |
| 2025 | China | Evil Unbound | 731 | Zhao Linshan | The story of atrocities committed by the Imperial Japanese Army's Unit 731 | |
| 2025 | Russia | August | Август | Nikita Vysotsky; Ilya Lebedev | Operation Bagration | |
| 2025 | Spain; Kazakhstan | The Truce | La tregua Бітім | Miguel Ángel Vivas | Karlag Corrective Labor Camp | |
| 2025 | United States | Truth and Treason | | Matt Whitaker | Biopic of Helmuth Hübener, youngest anti-Nazi executed by the Volksgerichtshof | |
| 2026 | Sweden | The Swedish Connection | Den svenska länken | Thérèse Ahlbeck; Marcus Olsson | The story of Swedish foreign ministry bureaucrat Gösta Engzell who developed and executed covert plans to rescue European Jewish refugees | |
| 2026 | United Kingdom; France | Pressure | | Anthony Maras | Depicting the 72 hours prior to the Normandy landings | |
| 2026 | United States | Lucky Strike | | Rod Lurie | American soldier fights for survival while behind enemy lines during the Second Battle of the Ardennes (Bulge). | |

== See also ==
- List of World War II short films
- List of World War II documentary films
- List of Allied propaganda films of World War II
- List of Holocaust films
- List of partisan films – films about World War II in Yugoslavia
