= Huang Ching-cheng =

Taiwanese sculptor (1912–1943)

- 黃清埕
- Born: 1912; Xiyu, Hōko, Taiwan, Empire of Japan
- Died: 1943 (aged 30–31)
- Education: Tokyo Fine Arts School
- Occupation: Sculptor

Huang Ching-cheng (Chinese: 黃清埕/黃清呈; pinyin: Huang Qingcheng; Wade–Giles: Huang Ch'ing-ch'eng; 1912–1943) was a Taiwanese sculptor. Huang is considered to be one of the pioneers of Taiwanese modern art, with Lai Hsien-tsung holding him in similar regard to famous Taiwanese sculptor Ju Ming.

Huang's sculpture "Study of a Head" (頭像; tóuxiàng) was the first modern work of art in Taiwan that was declared a part of the island's cultural heritage that is protected by a new law passed in 2009. It is exhibited in the Kaohsiung Museum of Fine Arts.

== Early life ==
Huang was born in Chidong Village (池東村), Xiyu, Hōko Prefecture. This island group had been ceded to Japan by the Chinese government in 1895, like the rest of Taiwan and the Ryu-Kyo Islands, after the First Sino-Japanese War. Huang's father owned a pharmacy. Huang, who was raised in a fairly wealthy family, showed an interest in creative activity at an early age. As a boy, he already did small figures made of clay, his elder brother later remembered. He also painted, showing considerable talent which prompted a teacher to encourage him.

Because his father's pharmacy was located in Kaohsiung, a major location in South Taiwan which was already a fairly big city, he was sent there in 1925 to attend Kaohsiung Senior High School. He dropped out, however, because he wanted to dedicate more time to painting; therefore, his father had him educated by a private teacher. Because his father wanted him to become a pharmacist, he was sent to a teacher of pharmacology in 1933. Then, he went on to Tokyo, for advanced studies in pharmacology.

=== Study of art in Tokyo ===
Huang still wanted to be an artist, so in 1936, at 24 years old, Huang was admitted to a Japanese art academy, the Tōkyō Bijutsu Gakkō (東京美術学校, or Tokyo School of Fine Arts), an art academy that had a good reputation.

When Huang Ching-cheng had departed for Tokyo in 1936, the Second Sino-Japanese War was less than a year away, and the Nanking massacre would happen in November 1937. Chauvinism and militarist sentiments were on the rise. The situation deteriorated with the outbreak of the war against China (1937), and even more-so in 1939/40 when the democracy that still had existed up to a point in the late 1930s was rapidly suspended.

Huang Ching-cheng was violating the dominant ethical code at the time which required filial piety, since he was not studying pharmacology as his father wanted; "When his father became aware of this matter, in anger he stopped sending him money for his living expenses and tuition. (…) His brother Huang Qingshun (Ching-Shuan Huang) secretly lent him money, however, and this aid helped him, in part, to complete his studies."

== Career ==
=== Early work and the influence of Beethoven ===
The financial support provided by Huang's brother proved insufficient in an expensive city like Tokyo, so Huang was compelled to work professionally as an artist while still in art school. In these highly productive years, he created a considerable number of art works, among them various busts. He also did “full body sculptures” and “seated sculptures.”

Among the works created by Huang Ching-cheng, there were a number of sculptures of Beethoven. Beethoven was a composer whom the artist greatly admired, as his elder brother confirmed later on.

Huang's interest in music, and more specifically in music from the West, is partly explained by his close relationship with a young pianist, Guixiang Li (李桂香; Kwei-Hsiang Lee). There was more to it, however: generally speaking, Ludwig van Beethoven and Auguste Rodin stood for modernism at the time, as Y. L. Hsueh points out. More specifically, under the conditions that existed in Tokyo in the 1930s and 40s, Beethoven and his music stood for cosmopolitanism and a thirst for freedom.

David B. Dennis has pointed out that Beethoven's Ode to Joy was always interpreted as an "Ode to Freedom" by progressives around the world: "Beethoven's enthusiasm about the French Revolution" is well known. As a Rhinelander, Beethoven had cherished Napoleonic reforms that increased civil liberties and introduced a progressive legal frame of reference: the Napoleonic Code or Code civil. In Chinese art, literature, and music, criticism of rulers has often been allusive and indirect. Huang's choice of Beethoven turns out to be in line with this tradition, that “certain cultural heroes often find favor with Chinese artists (…)" because it allows them to take a stand.

=== Sculpture ===
Huang's relationship with Guixiang Li (with whom he shared a passion for Beethoven) is not only revealed indirectly in his Beethoven sculptures. Among the few sculptures of Huang Ching-cheng that are known to have survived World War II and that are exhibited in museums in Taiwan, there is a bust that is titled "My Girlfriend Guei-shiang"; it is part of the collection of the National Taiwan Museum of Fine Arts in Taichung (Guólì Táiwān měishùguǎn/Táizhōng shì, 國立台灣美術館; 台中市).

=== MOUVE ===
In 1937, Huang Ching-cheng teamed up with graduate students at the Tokyo School of Fine Arts to form an artist group that would organize joint exhibitions. According to G. Huang (黃光男; Huáng Guāngnán) and X. Liao (廖新田; Liào Xīntián), these young artists "seceded from the Tai Yang artists’ association" when they formed their own group. Huang and Liao notice the group's "non-mainstream atmosphere."

The anti-mainstream artists soon called their group MOUVE (derived from the French word mouvement). Lai mentions another term by which the artists referred to their group, writing that the name chosen was “Action Art Group (or MOUVE painting group).” “Action Art Group” in Chinese is “行動美術集團; xíngdòng měishù jítuán”. According to Chin-hsien Li, it was “Lán Yùn-dēng who recommended the name MOUVE”. Chin-hsien Li points out that, at first, the young artists only wrote MOUVE “in Japanese katakana" which emphasized the term's French origin: no Chinese equivalent of the name existed initially. It was a symbolic choice that indicated a turn to the "new", away from the traditional art embraced by scholars and artists educated during the Qing dynasty, and away from the academic Western-style painting practiced by many artists in Tokyo.

The rules that were drawn up by the group stressed research or studies: “1. Our goal is to study from each other frequently. 2. Each year, exhibitions of our studies shall not be fixed in numbers but shall be held when and where suitable (…)”. Hsien-tsung Lai refers to the group as "anti-establishment". Jen-yi Lai specifically refers to the "Bohemian spirit" revealed in the works of one painter of this group, Jui-Lin Hung (洪瑞麟; Hóng Ruìlín), whom she singles out. But the Bohemian attitude was symptomatic of all members of this group.

Indeed, “MOUVE, at the time, was free. Works were exhibited every year, no works were excluded. Regardless of how often they would take part, regardless of how many works they wanted to show, every member could participate anytime, anywhere in the joint exhibition. This was the so-called MOUVE spirit.” Clearly, “the name was a symbol of avant-garde and of youth.”

On 19 March 1938, the artists who had formed the new group, Chang Wan-chuan (張萬傳; Zhāng Wànchuán), Hung Jui-Lin (洪瑞麟; Hóng Ruìlín), Chen De-wang (陳德旺; Chén Déwàng), Chi-ch’eng Lu (呂基正; Lǚ Jīzhèng), Chunde Chen (陳春德; Chén Chūndé), Huang Ching-cheng, and Liu-jen Teng (等六人; Děng Liùrén) had their first group exhibition. Except for Huang, who was a sculptor and painter, they were all painters.

=== Painting ===
Critics at the time saw Huang Ching-cheng not only as a remarkable sculptor but also as a gifted painter. It has been emphasized that “(d)uring his study in Japan, he (…) specialized in oil painting and held a solo exhibition." Oil on canvas was preferred to ink and to water color techniques by a majority of modernist East Asian artists. In this, Huang was not different from other Taiwan-born painters, who studied in the "Western painting" division of a Japanese art academy.

Chun-hsien Li (李俊賢; Li Jùnxián), art historian at the Kaohsiung Museum of Fine Arts, has noted the distinctive traits and the novelty of Huang's paintings; he writes, “If we look at Huang Ching-cheng's work – "Black Woman" (黑衣女人; hēi yī nǚrén), we get what may be described as a very direct sense of his use of color, which is very different from that found in the artistic environment of that era.” Lai also praises Huang when he speaks of “the mysterious painting, ‘Black Woman’ (...).”

=== Exhibitions ===
In 1939, sculptures by Huang Ching-cheng and by another Taiwanese artist, Chen Xiayu (陳夏雨), were accepted by a jury and “included in the Imperial Exhibition” (Teiten Empire Exhibition or Imperial Exhibition, in Japanese: 帝展) of that year.

A year later, in May 1940, the "MOUVE" group organized "a 'MOUVE Exhibition' of three artists" – Wan-chuan Chang (張萬傳), Yong Xie (謝國庸), and Huang Ching-cheng – in the Tainan Public Hall (台南公會堂; Táinán gōnghuì táng), Tainan (台南), South Taiwan. In the same year (1940), Huang received an award of the Japanese Sculptors’ Association and it was "recommended" that he should "become a member of the association".

=== MOUVE versus Tayang ===
MOUVE, which Huang Ching-cheng had founded together with several young Taiwan-born artists in Tokyo, was considered:

...at first glance, avant-garde, fresh air, so to speak, and the group's members were painting in a new way. But it was a small group after all, no match for the power of the mainstream, especially the "Taiyang Art Association". Lu Chi-cheng and Chen Chunde soon took refuge to "Taiyang", and thus in the following year (1941) there was a pause in the group's activities.

Another reason for this pause may have been Japan's attack on Pearl Harbor and thus, the outbreak of the Pacific War. At the end of 1940, the group – meaning, the majority of its members – had already left Japan. With the start of the Pacific war, when “MOUVE was taken to be an English name” by the authorities, the artists were forced to change its name: they changed the name to "Sculpture and Painting Association" (造型美術協會; zàoxíng měishù xiéhuì). Because some old members had left, it was a smaller group now. Under the new name Sculpture and Painting Association, the group soon “made a come-back with another exhibition": Those who participated in this group exhibition (in Taiwan rather than Tokyo) were Yün-teng Lan (藍 運燈; Lán Yùndēng), Yen Shui-long (顏水龍; Yán Shuǐlóng) and Cho-sao Fan (范倬造; Fàn Zhuōzào), in addition to the remaining original members.

A year later, "MOUVE ran (…) out of steam, winding things up in a frenzy like a whirlwind, and it soon disappeared without a trace, after having recorded the flowering and frustration of the opposition faction of Taiwan's art world."

=== Work in Tainan ===
Whereas other MOUVE artists, such as Jui-lin Hung, had already returned to Taiwan for good, Huang Ching-cheng remained based in Tokyo. However, "every summer, he would return to Taiwan for vacation", as the curator of the Kaohsiung Museum of Fine Arts (KMFA) notes: "Most of the time, he would live in the Tainan house of Kuo-Jong Hsieh" (謝國鏞; Xiè Guó-yōng). During these stays in Tainan, Huang "made a lot of sculptures for renowned officials of the Tainan district and had the support of local people in Tainan." In Tokyo, Huang completed his studies at the Tokyo School of Fine Arts, and was soon recognized for his outstanding talent and accomplishment. He was honored by being invited to participate in several important exhibitions, among them the Bunten Art Exhibition of the Japanese Ministry of Education.

== Death ==
In 1943, Huang Ching-cheng was offered a teaching position at the Beiping Art School in Peking, which was then a city occupied by the Japanese army. Planning to go to Taiwan first, the artist boarded the passenger liner Takachiho Maru in Kobe, Japan, together with Guixiang Li. The ship was torpedoed by an American submarine as it approached Kīrun, and around 1,000 passengers were killed, with few survivors. Huang Ching-cheng was among the casualties and was 31 when he died. Huang's premature death was a considerable loss that was felt in the art world of Taiwan.

== Taiwanese art after Huang (1940s–1950s) ==
While Huang Ching-cheng died prematurely, the development of modern art in Taiwan was impeded shortly after by political repression. Artists and writers became victims of political repression, and the socio-cultural environment of the island at the time hurt the development of modern art.

The rebellious Jui-lin Hung, a leading figure of the MOUVE group, who had returned before 1943, became a miner and for several years could not afford oil colors and canvas. The painter Chen Cheng-po was shot by the Kuomintang (KMT) army in Chiayi in 1947, becoming one of the many victims of the so-called February 28 incident. Under these conditions, "(t)he development of new art movement(s) was in fact not a smooth one," as Chiung-jui Hsiao writes.

By the mid-1950s, martial law came into effect in Taiwan. Huang Jung-ts’an (黃榮燦; Huang Rong-tsan / Huáng Róngcàn), an artist who did realist woodcuts and who was a friend of the painter Chun-chen Li (李仲生; Li Zhòngshēng), was arrested. He was accused of "espionage in 1951 and (…) executed the next year." According to Hsiao, this

...event influenced avant-garde artists who were promoting modern art at that time. (…) In 1955, Chao Chung-Hsiang left for Spain because he got the scholarship to study, while Chu Teh-Chun went to France. (…) The school supporting Ho Tieh-hua was on the downside on account of political tensions. His art fairs started to be oppressed. Chuang Shih-ho was admonished and forced to move back to Ping-Tung (i.e., Pingtung City or 屏東; Píng dōng) (…) Ho Tieh-hua, on the other hand, (…) left for America in 1959 for good. In the same year, Lin Shen-yang attended the Sao Paulo Exhibition in Brazil as a judge and never returned.

There were also artistis who tried to continue their work; several of Huang Ching-cheng's colleagues who had participated in the MOUVE artists’ group founded a new group, the Era Art Association, in 1954.

== Legacy ==
Today, many art historians and artists in Taiwan agree on Huang's pioneering role as a modernist Taiwan-born sculptor. Together with two other sculptors, Tien-shen Pu (蒲添生; Pú Tiānshēng) who was born in 1912 like Huang, and Hsia-yu Chen (陳夏雨; Chen Xiayu) who was five years younger, Huang Ching-cheng belongs to the young generation of early Taiwan modernists who followed in the footsteps of Tu-shui Huang and who surpassed him in a way. Insofar, few would disagree with Ya-li Chen that, "Huang Tu-shui (黃土水), Huang Ching-cheng, Chen Hsia-yu (陳夏雨) and Pu Tien-sheng (蒲添生) were the most important sculptors in Taiwan" during the Colonial era that came to an end in 1945. Huang's creative role as one of the few Taiwan-born pioneers of early modern sculpture assures him a permanent place in the history of modern art in Taiwan.

=== Huang in film ===
In 2005, Huang Ching-cheng's life and work became the theme of a feature film by the Taiwanese film director Huang Yu-shan. The film, released in 2005 and titled The Strait Story, was discussed in two academic publications.

Huang Ching-cheng's life and work is also at the center of a documentary, The Forgotten: Reflections on Eastern Pond (2008), by Huang Yu-Shan.
