= Chuang Shih-ho =

Taiwanese painter (1923–2020)

- 莊世和
- Born: December 12, 1923; Tainan, Taiwan
- Died: November 18, 2020 (aged 96); Chaozhou, Pingtung, Taiwan
- Education: Kawabata School of Painting; Tokyo School of Fine Arts
- Known for: Painting, drawing
- Movement: Cubism, Surrealism

Chuang Shih-ho (Chinese: 莊世和; December 12, 1923 – November 18, 2020) was a Taiwanese painter.

== Life ==
Born in Tainan on 12 December 1923, his family moved to Pingtung when he was a child. In 1938, he went to Japan to study painting at the Kawabata School of Painting, and in 1940 he entered the Painting Department of the Tokyo School of Fine Arts. During his studies in Japan, he was exposed to avant-garde art such as Cubism, Dadaism, and Surrealism, as well as modernist ideas such as Bauhaus style.

After his return to Taiwan in 1946, he joined Ho Tieh-hua’s “New Art Movement of Free China” and became one of the few Taiwanese artists actively promoting avant-garde and modernist painting in the 1950s.

Chuang Shih-ho passed away on November 18, 2020.
