= Huang Yu-shan =

Taiwanese film director (born 1954)

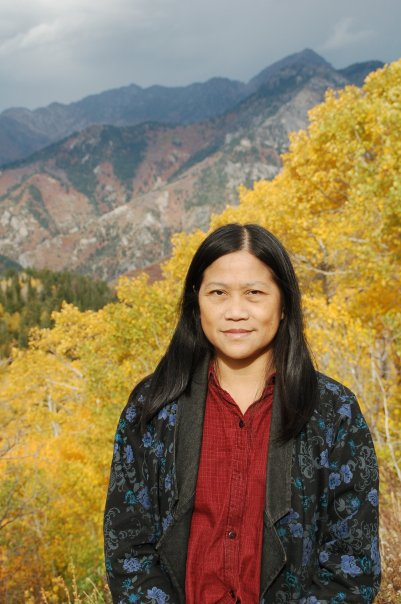
- Huang Yushan at the film festival in Sundance, Colorado, U.S.A.
- Born: 1954 (age 71–72); Penghu Island, Taiwan
- Occupations: Film director, art critic, short story writer, film critic, university teacher

Huang Yu-shan (Chinese: 黃玉珊; pinyin: Huang Yushan; born 1954) is a Taiwanese filmmaker. She has made significant contributions to Chinese cinema in the areas of aesthetics and cultural history. Her focus is the woman's viewpoint, and frequently challenges the status quo in what has been a male-dominated society.

== Early life ==
Although originally from Penghu Island, situated in the Taiwan Straits, Huang Yu-shan grew up in Kaohsiung, South Taiwan. Her family later moved to Taipei. Her father was a successful calligrapher who sold his works in Kaohsiung for many years. Huang Yu-shan's early awareness of the beauty of this art may have influenced her own creative development. Among her larger family she counts an important Taiwanese sculptor of the 1930s. Yushan Huang's feature film The Strait Story as well as the documentary The Petrel Returns are focused on this artist, Ching-cheng Huang (黃清埕; 1912–1943).

== Early career ==
After completing high school, she studied literature at Chengchi University in Mucha, Taipei. In the mid-1970s she worked for Yishu Gia (Artist Magazine) in Taipei, interviewing many painters, but also other artistically significant personalities on this island, such as the novelist and founder of the Cloud Gate Dance Theater, Lin Hwai-min, and the pioneer film director, Lee Hsing. In ca. 1977–79, Huang Yu-shan took an interest in the works of Eisenstein, Alain Resnais, Werner Herzog, Kenji Mizoguchi etc. She counted a number of cinéastes, such as Chien-yeh Huang (a film critic) and Ivan Wang, the editor of the film journal Yinxiang and founder of the Taipei Film Museum (today, the National Film Archives or Film Library) among her friends. And she belonged to a circle that organized private screenings of films such as Kurosawa's Red Beard, then forbidden by the censors of the Kuomintang dictatorship. She also saw works by Rainer Maria Fassbinder, Wim Wenders, F. W. Murnau, Hellmuth Costard, Werner Nekes, Dore O., Werner Schroeter and others at the German Cultural Center in Taipei. At the time, the center had just begun to depart from its routine of simply showing ‘Guten Tag’ movies for learners of the German language, thanks to the encouragement of a friend of Werner Nekes, the German poet and film critic Andreas Weiland who was teaching German and English literature at Tamkang University. These screenings attracted a number of cinéastes in Taipei and may have encouraged independent filmmakers.

In 1978, Huang Yu-shan began reading Pudovkin, Vertov, Eisenstein, André Bazin, Dudley Andrew and others whose writings she obtained in English. After she had worked as script writer for three movies of the film director Lee Hsing (李行) in 1977–1979, she went to study film-making at the University of Iowa and later, transferred to New York. In 1982 she graduated from New York University, having obtained an M.A. in Cinema Studies.

=== The late 1970s: A time of protest ===
The late 1970s were a time for debates but also of protest in Taiwan. Students organized big song events in the Taipei New Park, inviting folk singers considered subversive by the regime. Music cassettes with forbidden songs were distributed on campus. The protests on behalf of the regionalist and socially committed Nativist Literature, that was condemned by the pro-government media, was under way. In this period which preceded her departure to the U.S. in 1979, Huang Yu-shan quietly participated in relevant debates. In view of her South Taiwanese roots, it is clear that Huang Yu-shan objectively shared a closeness to the regionalist culture with the blind old singer of protest songs, Chen Da, with the four Tamsui-based political activists Lee Shuang-tse (李雙澤 pinyin: Li Shuāngzé, a young composer of songs considered subversive by the KMT government), Lee Yuan-chen (李元貞; the founder of Women Awakening), Liang Jingfeng (梁景峰) (who published under the pseudonym Liang Demin in the pro-democracy journal Summer Tide that was suppressed in 1979), and Wang Jinping (scholar and activist) (王津平). And – subjectively – even more with Annette Lu (呂秀蓮 Lu Hsiu-lien pinyin: Lǚ Xiùlián – another pioneer of the women's lib movement in Taiwan), with the progressive Chengchi University teacher and later political activist Wang Tuoh (王拓) and with the Hakka author Chao-cheng Chung (鍾肇政) whose novel Chatianshan zhi ge later on became the basis of one of her feature films. But she herself seems to have shied away from the protest movement. She preferred discussions with pro-democracy dissidents inside the governing party. But she was courageous enough to discuss Lu Xun (魯迅|s鲁迅|) (still a forbidden writer) with young authors and to write an article about the novelist Yang Kui (楊 逵, 1905–1985), a forerunner of Nativist writers like Chen Yinzhen, and a man whose commitment to social justice had resulted in a dozen short prison sentences during the Japanese occupation and imprisonment for 12 years on Green Island, the KMT regime's concentration camp.

== Films and work ==
In 1982, Huang Yu-shan returned to Taiwan. Her first film, a documentary about the Taiwanese artist Ju Ming, was completed in the same year. Her early works as a filmmaker were mainly documentaries. Several were focused on Taiwanese artists. If it is convincingly held that the later feature films “strongly identify with Taiwan as a place”, this was already true of her work in the early and mid-1980s. For her, culture and place were inseparable, and it was the specificity of the Taiwanese socio-culture that interested her more and more. A significant example that later on underscored this while expressing her feminist sympathies as well, is her film Women who have changed Taiwan, completed in 1993.

In August 1987, Huang Yu-shan was selected^{(by whom?)} to direct her first feature, Autumn Tempest, which starred the famous Korean actress Kang Su Yeon (姜受延). It brought her a certain measure of fame and also good box office results. She completed Autumn Tempest in 1988, working at the time as a director for the Central Motion Picture Corporation (CMPC), and a second feature film, Twin Bracelets, in 1989 as a director for the Metropolitan Film Corporation (a company associated with the Shaw Brothers’ Film Corporation). This helped her to establish her career as a film director. At the time, the CMPC had already begun to play an important role in the creation of the New Taiwan Cinema. YHuang u-shan's films belong to what became known as the Second New Wave.

It was the atmosphere of New York, and contact with people from the film-makers cooperative that encouraged Huang Yu-shan to become an independent film maker, rather than to rely permanently on the state-controlled Central Motion Picture Corporation. The financial success of Autumn Tempest enabled her to found the B & W Film Studio in 1988 with a group of supporters and thus, she began to do more feature films as well as a number of remarkable documentaries.

Since the 1990s, Huang Yu-shan has directed a number of other noteworthy films, such as Peony Birds, Spring Cactus, The Strait Story, The Song of Cha-tian Mountain, The Forgotten and Southern Night. Some of these films have been shown for several years in the context of such film festivals as the Jeonju International Film Festival (Korea), the Hangzhou Asian Film Festival, the International Women's Film Festival in Seoul, the Winelands film festival (South Africa) and at film festivals in France, the U.S., and Hamburg, Germany. Still, many critics and cinema lovers have not yet discovered her work. A feminist filmmaker in a certain sense, she has championed women's rights and the rights of gays and lesbians. A superficial view of her work may have resulted in her work being labelled, or "typed", as "feminist" or "chick-flick", and resulted in it being overlooked by some. Her horizon is wider than that, and socio-cultural issues, including her sustained insistence on the cultural specificity of the South Taiwanese heritage, remain prominent in her oeuvre. Huang Yu-shan, who explores her Taiwanese roots and especially the socio-cultural contribution of South Taiwan to Chinese culture, sees herself above all as a Chinese film-director. Like many progressives of her generation, she makes it clear that the people of the island of Taiwan and the Chinese motherland will always be important to her.

== In media ==
The film critic S.L.Wei calls her “a notable woman director who emerged in Taiwan in the late 1980s.” Linzhen Wang values her as “an important figure in Taiwan’s women’s cinema” and “a critical link among different filmmaking movements” that played a role on this island since the 1980s. Chun-chi Wang mentions Edward Yang and Huang Yu-shan in one breath. Yang's A Brighter Summer Day appears noteworthy to her because it “deals with the political history of Taiwan in the ‘60s in an art film style.” Huang is the noteworthy “feminist director” whose film Twin Bracelets was “internationally acclaimed.” Twin Bracelets critiques the suppression of women that women justly revolt against, not only in East Asia, but in many parts of the world.

=== Feminism ===
It cannot be ignored that female critics especially value her contribution, and this perhaps because most if not all of her films “take the narrative point of view of women.” Feminist support and her own focus upon the woman's view may in fact have had a negative effect on her wider recognition. She has been described as "one of the most underrated directors in Chinese-language cinema.” And yet it is true, as the critic S.L. Wei noted in 2011, that “she remains an important voice” whereas, obviously, “her works are long overdue a retrospective.” Offering an alternative to feminist critical discourse and feminist reasons for a positive evaluation of her movies, film critic Prof. Lai (Taipei University) values Huang's work above all for its aesthetic qualities as well as the fact that it is rooted in the history of Taiwan. About her film The Strait Story, Mr. Lai writes: “The film, on the one hand, reflects on Taiwan’s cultural history realistically, and on the other hand, it represents Taiwan’s history poetically. Its employment of poetic visual language does not aim to convey a sense of self-pity but to transcend the historical traumas that this island has experienced.”

In addition to her achievements as a film director, Huang Yu-shan has been instrumental in developing platforms for feminist issues and for independent cinema. Supported by Lee Yuan-chen (李元貞) and other members of the Women Awakening group, she founded Taiwan's Women Make Waves film festival in 1993. And subsequently, she was instrumental in starting the South Taiwan film festival which features works of independent filmmakers from many countries. Apart from working currently as an independent film director, she also teaches film-making at Tainan National University of the Arts.

== Filmography ==
=== Documentaries ===
Zhu Míng. – English title: Ju Ming. On the Taiwanese artist Zhu Ming – 1982

Sìjì rú chun de Táibei. – [Transl.: Taipei, year round spring] English title: Letters from Taipei – 1983

Miù si. – English title: Muse – 1984

Yángguang huàjia wúxuànsan. – The Paintings of A-Sun – 1984

Shengmìng de xiyuè—chénjiaróng de huìhuà. Joy of Life – The development of a painting – 1986

Xuán qián zhuàn kun de táiwan nüxìng – Women Who Have Changed Taiwan – 1993

Xiao Zhen hé tamen – On Hsiao Chen [=Xiao Zhen] and his ensemble – 1994

Táiwan yìshù dàshiLiào Jìchun. – The Taiwanese artist Liao Jichun – 1996

Haiyàn [Transl.: Swallow]. English title: The Petrel Returns (on the painter Huang Ching-cheng) – 1997

Shìjì nüxìng táiwan dì yi—Xu Shìxián. – On Hsu Shih-hsien – 1999

Shìjì nüxìng táiwan fenghuá---xiu zé lán. – 2003

Zhongzhàozhèng wénxué lù. – Chung Chao-cheng's Literary Path – 2006

Chí dong jìshì [Transl.: Eastern Pond Chronicle]. – The Forgotten: Reflections on Eastern Pond – 2008

=== Feature films ===
Luòshan feng [Chinook] – Autumn Tempest – 1988

Shuang zhuó – Twin Bracelets – 1989

Mudan niao – Peony Birds – 1990

Zhenqíng kuáng ài [Cactus] – Spring Cactus – Alternative English title: Wild Love – 1999

Nánfang jìshì zhi fúshì guangying[Chronicle of the Ukiyo Southern Light] – The Strait Story / Alternative English title: Chronicle of Restoring Light – 2005

Chatianshan zhi ge – The Song of Cha-tian Mountain – 2007

Ye ye [Night night] – Southern Night – 1988
