= Takachiho Maru =

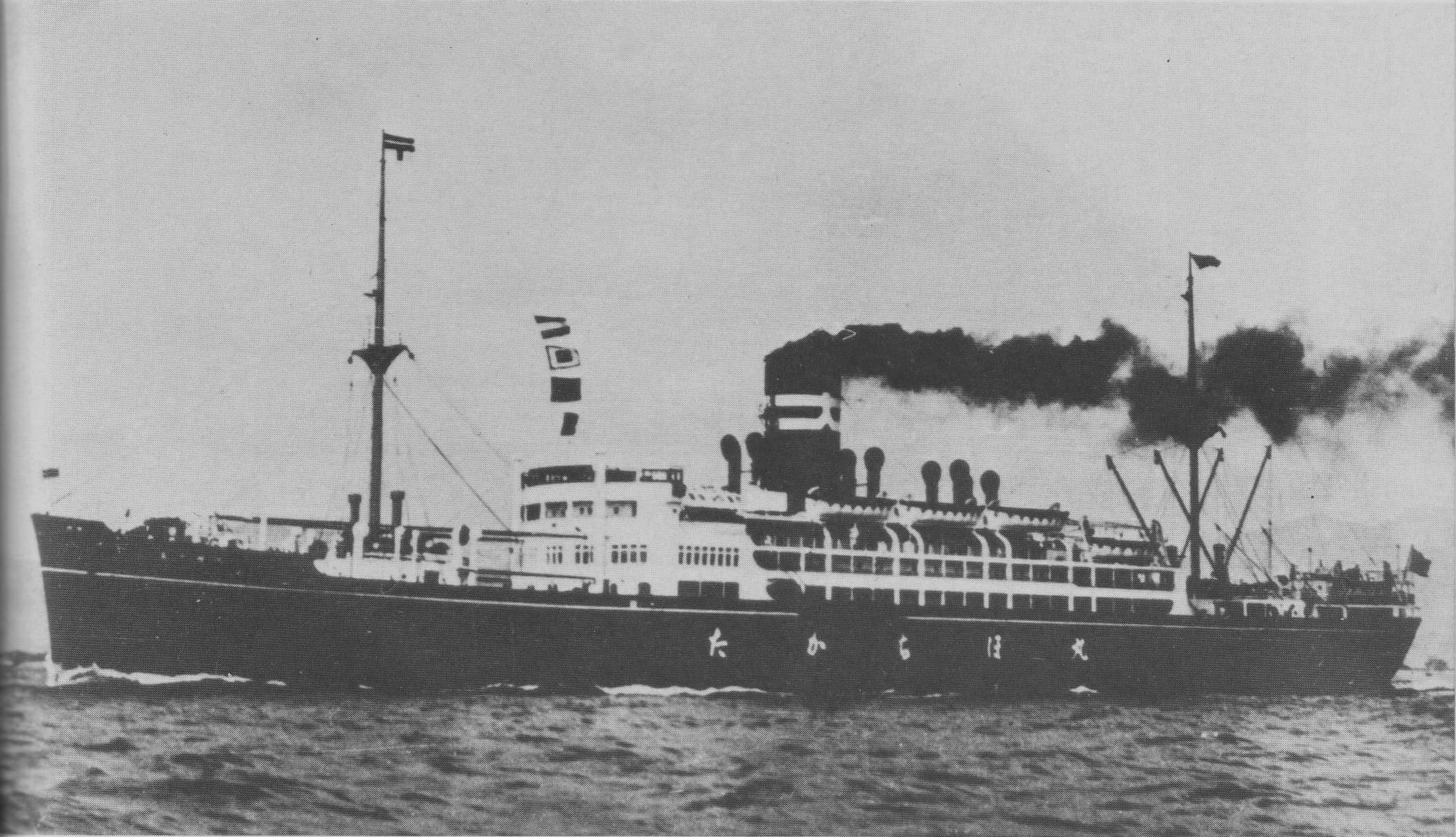

History

Japan
- Name: Takachiho Maru
- Owner: Osaka Shosen K. K. - OSK Line
- Port of registry: (Empire of Japan) Osaka
- Builder: Mitsubishi Heavy Industries
- Yard number: 533
- Laid down: 20 November 1932
- Launched: 5 October 1933
- Completed: 31 January 1934
- Acquired: 31 January 1934
- Maiden voyage: 10 February 1934
- In service: 10 February 1934
- Out of service: 19 March 1943
- Identification: Official number: 38759; Call sign: JWIH
- Fate: Torpedoed and sunk on 19 March 1943

General characteristics
- Type: Ocean liner
- Tonnage: 8,154 GRT
- Length: 138.16 m (453 ft 3 in)
- Beam: 17.98 m (59 ft 0 in)
- Height: 30.1 m (98 ft 9 in) (from waterline to top of mast); 10.3 m (33 ft 10 in) (from waterline to top of bridge); 19.2 m (63 ft 0 in) (from waterline to top of funnel)
- Depth: 11.28 m (37 ft 0 in)
- Installed power: 2 triple expansion steam engines
- Propulsion: Double screw propellers
- Speed: 19 knots (35 km/h; 22 mph)
- Capacity: Accommodation for 785 passengers (35 in First class, 132 in Second class & 618 in Steerage)
- Crew: 176
- Notes: Two masts and a single funnel

SS Takachiho Maru was a Japanese ocean liner that was torpedoed and sunk on 19 March 1943 by the United States Navy submarine USS Kingfish in the Formosa Strait off North Keelung, Formosa, China at (25°50′N 122°30′E), while she was travelling from Moji, Japan, to Manila, Philippines via Keelung, resulting in the loss of an estimated 844 to 1,200 lives.

== Construction ==
Takachiho Maru was laid down on 20 November 1932 at the Mitsubishi Heavy Industries shipyard in Nagasaki, Japan. She was launched on 5 October 1933 and completed on 31 January 1934. The ship was 138.16 metres (453 ft 3 in) long, with a beam of 17.98 metres (59 ft 0 in) and a depth of 11.28 metres (37 ft 0 in). The ship was assessed at 8,154 gross register tons (GRT). She had two triple expansion steam engines rated at 9,185 indicated horsepower (6,849 kW), driving two screws which allowed her to achieve a maximum speed of 19 knots (35 km/h; 22 mph). She had a single funnel and two masts alongside accommodation for 785 passengers which included 35 in First class, 132 in Second class & 618 in Steerage.

== Early career ==
Takachiho Maru departed on her maiden voyage from Kobe to Keelung via Moji on 10 February 1934 and completed the journey without incident, after which Takachiho Maru would sail this route throughout her career. The ship was requisitioned by the Imperial Japanese Army in August 1937 to be used as a troopship during the Second Sino-Japanese War to transport soldiers to China. Takachiho Maru served as a troopship for six months before she was returned to her original owners in March 1938 and continued to serve the Kobe to Keelung route. Takachiho Maru was requisitioned again by the Imperial Japanese Army in September 1941 in order to repatriate Japanese citizens from the Dutch East Indies as tensions in the region rose during the early stages of World War II. The ship was released from duty and once again returned to her original owners in December 1941.

== Loss ==
Takachiho Maru departed Moji on a routine trip to Manila on 17 March 1943 while carrying 913 troops and passengers alongside 176 crewmen and 2,614 tons of general cargo. on 19 March 1943 at 8.05 am, Takachiho Maru was sighted by the United States Navy submarine USS Kingfish in the Formosa Strait off North Keelung, Formosa, China. The ship was sailing unescorted at 15 knots (28 km/h; 17 mph) in a zig-zag pattern as to deter submarine attacks, but this could not prevent USS Kingfish from firing a spread of four torpedoes at Takachiho Maru from a distance of 1,645 metres (1,799 yd) at 9.30 am. The torpedoes were spotted by the crew of Takachiho Maru and evasive action was taken to steer away from the oncoming torpedoes. The port turn managed to make one torpedo miss the ship, yet three torpedoes still struck the ship of which one was a dud. The two functioning torpedoes exploded on the starboard side, one in the cargo hold aft of the bridge and the other at the stern. The attack knocked out the ship's radio, so no distress signal could be transmitted as the ship began to list to starboard and settle by the stern. As the passengers, troops and crew began to make for the ship's lifeboats, a number of gunners aboard managed to fire one salvo at the American submarine but failed to hit it. Only three lifeboats and four rafts were successfully lowered before Takachiho Maru sank at 9.39 am, taking approximately 844 passengers, crew and troops with her. The 245 survivors who managed to board the lifeboats and rafts were rescued the following days by sailing to Agincourt or being picked up by nearby Okinawa fishing boats and a Japanese warship. A naval patrol boat was only send out to search for Takachiho Maru from Keelung after the ship was two days late to arrive without radio communication, but it only found wreckage from the ship alongside the survivors that had previously reached Agincourt.

== Wreck ==
The wreck of Takachiho Maru lies at 25°50′N 122°30′E and a memorial for the ship and the lives lost on her was erected in Nakano Cemetery in Tsu City on 12 November 2001.
