= Freelance (disambiguation) =

A freelancer is a person who pursues an occupation without a long-term commitment to any particular employer.

Freelance or Freelancer may also refer to:

- Freelancer.com, a freelance marketplace website
- Freelance (1971 film), a British thriller
- Freelance (2007 film), a low-budget independent comedy
- Freelance (2023 film), an American action-comedy
- Freelancers (film), a 2012 American crime drama
- Freelancers (TV series), a 2019 comedy series
- Freelancer (video game), a 2003 space simulation video game
- "Freelance" (song), a 2018 song by Toro y Moi from the album Outer Peace
- "Freelance", a 1979 song by Survivor from the album Survivor
- Freelance, the local title for Heart Attack, a 2015 romantic Thai film
- The Freelancer, a 2023 Indian action-thriller series
- Free Lance (New Zealand) (1900–1960), weekly pictorial newspaper (available via PapersPast from 1900 to 1920)
