= List of Studio C episodes =

Comedy sketch group

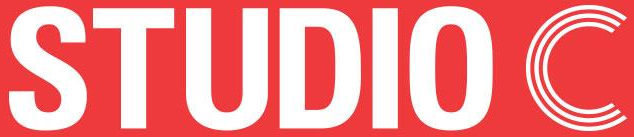
Logo of the show

Studio C is an American family-friendly, comedy sketch group created by Matt Meese and Jared Shores. Derek Marquis and Scott Swofferd share the job of executive producer on the show. It is produced by Meese, Luiz Malaman and BYU TV. Each half-hour long episode consists of about seven or eight comedy sketches performed by a group of comedians. Most are performed at BYU Studios in Provo, Utah in front of a studio audience, though some sketches get filmed off-set and are aired, pre-recorded. All of the group's sketches are distributed on BYUtv and on YouTube.

The group was created in 2012, sprouting from a previous comedy group, Divine Comedy that was created by Meese at Brigham Young University. Studio C's name is a reference to the studio in the BYU Broadcasting Building where the show is primarily taped. As of December 2019, Studio C had a YouTube channel with over 2.3 million subscribers and almost 2 billion total views. Their channel features many skits from the show, along with a few YouTube exclusives. Studio C's most popular video is "Top Soccer Shootout Ever With Scott Sterling", which by the end of 2019 had over 70 million views on YouTube. Studio C posts new videos on YouTube every Tuesday and Friday.

In August 2018, it was confirmed that Studio C would have a 10th season but the ten original cast members would be leaving after the 9th season to create and star together on a new family-comedy network called JK! Studios. With Johnson and Pence returning to the show, the 10th season featured all-new cast members. The group's eleventh season began on April 6, 2020, and ended on June 15, 2020. During the twelfth season in October 2020, it was announced that original cast member Jason Gray would return for the series' fourteenth season in fall 2021.

On June 8, 2023, it was announced that Studio C was renewed for Season 17 & 18, airing in Fall 2023 and Spring 2024 respectively. The premiere of Season 17 marked the 200th episode of Studio C and to kick-off this milestone, this 200th episode featured 18 past and current cast members, including the return of all 10 original cast members.

== Series overview ==
Season	Episodes	Originally released	
Season	Episodes	First released	Last released
S	13	October 5, 2013	February 27, 2023
1	10	October 8, 2012	December 10, 2012
2	12	April 1, 2013	June 17, 2013
3	10	October 8, 2013	December 10, 2013
4	10	April 7, 2014	June 16, 2014
5	10	October 6, 2014	December 8, 2014
6	20	September 7, 2015	April 18, 2016
7	19	October 1, 2016	April 3, 2017
8	15	October 2, 2017	April 2, 2018
9	16	September 10, 2018	March 25, 2019
10	11	September 30, 2019	December 9, 2019
11	10	April 6, 2020	June 15, 2020
12	10	October 5, 2020	December 7, 2020
13	10	February 8, 2021	April 12, 2021
14	10	September 27, 2021	November 29, 2021
15	10	March 14, 2022	May 16, 2022
16	7	October 3, 2022	February 27, 2023
17	8	October 16, 2023	December 4, 2023
18	8	March 3, 2024	April 21, 2024
19	7	October 14, 2024	November 25, 2024
20	7	March 3, 2025	April 14, 2025
21	7	October 13, 2025	November 24, 2025
22	7	April 9, 2026	May 21, 2026
23	7	October 19, 2026	November 30, 2026

== Episodes ==
=== Season 1 (2012) ===
No. overall	No. in season	Episode title	Original release date
1	1	Season 1 Episode 1	October 8, 2012
Mallory finds love at a Halloween dance, Matt shares some doorstep dating insight with Mallory, and Jason expresses his feelings about Rhode Island.
2	2	Season 1 Episode 2	October 15, 2012
Matt and Mallory lose their camera, Jason leads the group on a trek to Oregon, and Shoulder Angel advises against robbery.
3	3	Season 1 Episode 3	October 22, 2012
Mallory tells two truths, Whitney goes on a blind date, and Jason makes a new friend at the family BBQ.
4	4	Season 1 Episode 4	October 29, 2012
The group dance-offs if Dana really is dead, Matt explains the importance of going green, and Whitney directs Matt and Mallory on stage.
5	5	Season 1 Episode 5	November 5, 2012
The group plays their first gig, Matt works on his New Year's resolution, and Jason learns how to play mafia.
6	6	Season 1 Episode 6	November 12, 2012
Matt loses a little blood with Mallory and Jason, Spencer meets his new roommate, and the group meets some new classmates.
7	7	Season 1 Episode 7	November 19, 2012
Matt inspires his men to fight the good fight, Jason is dumped through a surrogate, and Mallory remembers her late kitty.
8	8	Season 1 Episode 8	November 26, 2012
Spencer meets an old friend, Jason's shoulder devil tries his luck, and Whitney's weight is called into question.
9	9	Season 1 Episode 9	December 3, 2012
The group tries to brainstorm ideas, Franny proves to be a true man, and Whitney can't express in words how excited she is to get married.
10	10	Season 1 Episode 10	December 10, 2012
The Friz has her teaching techniques called into question, Mallory proves her aim isn't too sharp, and the Shoulder Angel meets his greatest challenge yet. Guest Star: Shawn Bradley, former NBA player and BYU alumnus, as himself

=== Season 2 (2013) ===
No. overall	No. in season	Episode title	Original release date
11	1	Season 2 Episode 1	April 1, 2013
Mr. Eckelstone teaches kids how to drive, Downton proves to be full of drama, and breaking up becomes more difficult than one might think.
12	2	Season 2 Episode 2	April 8, 2013
The TSA tries to stop true love, da Vinci finds difficulty in painting his latest portrait, and the high school spelling bee gets an update.
13	3	Season 2 Episode 3	April 15, 2013
Poker players give their inner thoughts, Ann helps a visitor find a good book, and the police chief tries to protect innocent ears.
14	4	Season 2 Episode 4	April 22, 2013
Good Cop and Bad Cop call in a friend for backup, the Great Kenny has his greatest magic trick yet, Captain Literally saves us from hyperbole, and the long awaited will of Ezekiel Josiah Worthington is read.
15	5	Season 2 Episode 5	April 29, 2013
Three doctors try a new treatment method, a young lawyer has his first experience in court, and Mr. Eckelstone teaches scouts the dangers of wilderness survival.
16	6	Season 2 Episode 6	May 6, 2013
Get a rare sneak peek behind the scenes of Studio C, watch as Gandalf confronts his biggest challenge yet, and see Ann go door to door renewing library cards.
17	7	Season 2 Episode 7	May 13, 2013
The Indian in the Cupboard proves difficult to find, the Disney Vault comes under attack, and Jim Blonde gears up for his next mission.
18	8	Season 2 Episode 8	May 20, 2013
Matt's stand-up routine is interrupted, eating bisque for lunch is harder than it should be, and Sidious is determined to bring his roommates to the dark side.
19	9	Season 2 Episode 9	May 27, 2013
A tango competition gets a little sticky, Jason Bourne faces his greatest challenge yet, and deathbed repentance is trickier than expected.
20	10	Season 2 Episode 10	June 3, 2013
The students at the flirting academy finally graduate, the radio mystery hour comes crashing down, and Regis helps the latest Millionaire contestant.
21	11	Season 2 Episode 11	June 10, 2013
Roger's wobbly wheelbarrow is stolen, finding the drop is harder than it appears, and the characters of Candyland are in a financial crisis.
22	12	Season 2 Episode 12	June 17, 2013
The weatherman gives his final five-day forecast, Gollum tries to work out his issues, and Shoulder Angel overcomes the Secret Service.

=== Season 3 (2013) ===
No. overall	No. in season	Episode title	Original release date
23	1	Season 3 Episode 1	October 8, 2013
Professor Wilcox teaches the subtle and sophisticated art of photobombing, Matt tells his dad about a fight at school, and the Shoulder Angel turns to his own shoulder angel for guidance. Guest Stars: Stan Ellsworth, host of BYUtv's American Ride, as Jimmy's Dad; Mates of State as musical guests; and McKay Lindsey as Female Shoulder Angel
24	2	Season 3 Episode 2	October 15, 2013
Matt's parents invested ALL of his inheritance, a hungry friend gets rather emotional after losing something very dear to him at a funeral, and Hank plans an unusual surprise party.
25	3	Season 3 Episode 3	October 22, 2013
Mallory testifies to Matt's inability to commit the crime he's accused of, Marco Polo visits the future to see how his namesake has affected future generations, and at a charity auction, a bidding war reaches levels beyond mere money.
26	4	Season 3 Episode 4	October 29, 2013
An uncooperative lineup suspect won't read his line to the cops, Ann meets her greatest heartthrob – R.L. Stine, and the group struggles to find the real killer in an episode of Murder Mystery Mansion.
27	5	Season 3 Episode 5	November 5, 2013
Mrs. America is crowned, a ninety-year-old cameraman struggles during a live taping of the Beatles, and the USA tells Great Britain that she will never get back together with him.
28	6	Season 3 Episode 6	November 11, 2013
A father and his hyperactive son finally discover the genie's lamp, a restaurant offers lower-calorie options with strings attached, and the truth finally settles a long sibling rivalry.
29	7	Season 3 Episode 7	November 18, 2013
Mr. Eckelstone subs in the local Lamaze class, a talk show host tries to keep it together before the commercial break, and a high school team has to play a little ugly to win.
30	8	Season 3 Episode 8	November 26, 2013
A bright inventor has each of his brilliant ideas ruined, a couple on a hike assists a stranded stranger, and Teddy explains how his story business works. Guest Star: McKay Lindsey as Female Shoulder Angel
31	9	Season 3 Episode 9	December 3, 2013
Stephen waits in an extremely romantic restaurant for his date to arrive, Whitney tries to learn how Mallory rates their friendship, and a soup loving family prepares to meet their son's new girlfriend.
32	10	Season 3 Episode 10	December 10, 2013
Santa learns new ways to show his love at Christmas, Kyle's mom takes him to the mall to visit Santa, and Christmas is not complete without toys coming to life.

=== Season 4 (2014) ===
No. overall	No. in season	Episode title	Original release date
33	1	Season 4 Episode 1	April 7, 2014
The Studio C cast starts off Season 4 with a simple elevator ride, the crew on the Starship Enterprise takes a major fall, and the mad scientist invents his most terrifying creation yet.
34	2	Season 4 Episode 2	April 14, 2014
A helpful banana tries to teach Tommy the importance of eating right, Matt discovers his future career, and the Founding Fathers welcome James Madison to the group.
35	3	Season 4 Episode 3	April 21, 2014
The survivors of a crashed plane search for help, Jason and his friends play the greatest video game ever, and the group at Hogwarts welcomes their newest class member.
36	4	Season 4 Episode 4	April 28, 2014
Celine Dion introduces her daughter Lexi to the world, the world fencing championships reveal the greatest slow motion replay to date, and Adam tries to ditch his annoying wingman at the club.
37	5	Season 4 Episode 5	May 5, 2014
The local nuclear facility has a little meltdown, mothers get their new anthem, and Mozart is entertained by his greatest student yet.
38	6	Season 4 Episode 6	May 12, 2014
The newest Star Wars production runs into a couple bumps, Leo the kiosk worker proves to be a bigger challenge than expected, and the male mind proves to be a little more divided than previously imagined.
39	7	Season 4 Episode 7	May 19, 2014
Mates of State joins the whale rally, the president fights through his most challenging press conference yet, and the gods of the Greek Parthenon introduce themselves. Guest Star: Mates of State as musical guests
40	8	Season 4 Episode 8	June 2, 2014
Marvin ruins another party game, the Mad Scientist reveals his next evil invention, and the Guild of Adventurers regroup and try to press onward after their last defeat.
41	9	Season 4 Episode 9	June 9, 2014
Elementary students lose a couple friends when the ground turns to lava, the Royal Queen tries to understand social media better, and a marketing team has big ideas for lobster bisque. Guest Star: David Bazan as Twin Therapist
42	10	Season 4 Episode 10	June 16, 2014
The president gives his most motivational pep talk, the Brothers Grimm try to tell the commoners their latest story, and Studio C ends the season with a fond farewell.

=== Season 5 (2014) ===
No. overall	No. in season	Episode title	Original release date
43	1	Season 5 Episode 1	October 6, 2014
The whole cast welcomes you to Season 5 of Studio C, Matt finds a new world in his couch, and James's friends try to explain how to walk properly.
44	2	Season 5 Episode 2	October 13, 2014
The Doctor pops in to help out humanity, Matt tries to make a simple PB&J sandwich for a friendly picnic, and a home burglar gets more than he bargained for from some home owners. Guest Stars: Stars as musical guests and Dave Bresnahan as Elf-lord
45	3	Season 5 Episode 3	October 20, 2014
The Smiths fight back against their conniving brother, the different people in Adam's brain help him once again, and America finds herself in a bitter custody battle.
46	4	Season 5 Episode 4	October 27, 2014
In this Halloween special, Matt and Mal find themselves in a prank gone wrong, the Justice Trio saves the day once again, and then Grandpa tells the scariest ghost stories his grandkids have ever heard.
47	5	Season 5 Episode 5	November 3, 2014
Matt gives his last words before his sentence is carried out and everyone's favorite Hunger Games characters try to decide who Katniss should marry in the best way possible: by singing about it!
48	6	Season 5 Episode 6	November 10, 2014
Ken Burns uncovers the true story of Lewis and Clark's expedition, there is love in the air at the local ice cream parlor, and the people of Couchville return to regain power in the kingdom.
49	7	Season 5 Episode 7	November 17, 2014
This special forty-ninth episode has a lot to offer. Matt has a whole network dedicated to his achievements, The New York Times Best Sellers committee tutors their newest hire, and Mal is given more advice on breaking up with Jason. Cameo: Steve Young, former NFL quarterback and BYU alumnus
50	8	Season 5 Episode 8	November 24, 2014
A high school graduation ceremony gets a little off track, the search for Rapunzel finally comes to an end, and the Matt Center team makes another inconvenient appearance.
51	9	Season 5 Episode 9	December 1, 2014
The local cop precinct gets sensitivity training, the school janitor helps a studying couple with their chemistry, and the Channel 8 News team has their broadcast time cut down to only a few minutes for their whole report. Cameo: Steve Young, former NFL quarterback and BYU alumnus
52	10	Season 5 Episode 10	December 8, 2014
It's Christmas time at Studio C, and Santa gives Mrs. Claus his best present yet. The elves start to unionize for a fair working environment, and Stephen gets a peek at what life would look like if he were never born. Merry Christmas everyone!

=== Season 6 (2015–16) ===
No. overall	No. in season	Episode title	Original release date
53	1	Season 6 Episode 1	September 7, 2015
The cast kicks off Season 6 with a glimpse into the future of Studio C, a couple's doctor visit takes a sudden turn when shots are administered, and a revolutionary war gentleman labors to save Lady Gordon, a fainting damsel in distress.
54	2	Season 6 Episode 2	September 14, 2015
An unhappy crayon crashes a group song during a children's television show, The Piano Guys plan yet another unbelievable music video, and Wonder Woman confronts the rest of the Justice League on team issues. Guest Stars: The Piano Guys
55	3	Season 6 Episode 3	September 21, 2015
Matt plays a strange round of Bop-it, an overdramatic poet interrupts her roommate's game night, and a male seahorse juggles the new emotional toll of being pregnant.
56	4	Season 6 Episode 4	September 28, 2015
A church congregation takes their minister's sermon too literally, Matt tries to cheer up a sad friend, and a study group performs a scientific experiment on the phenomenon known as the Four Page Zone.
57	5	Season 6 Episode 5	October 5, 2015
Two brothers dispute over sibling love, Jeremy travels back in time to stop World War II, and the people of Couchville band together to retake Matt's house from the Ottoman Empire.
58	6	Season 6 Halloween Special	October 26, 2015
It's another spook-tacular Studio C Halloween special. A frustrated ghost coordinates his hauntings with his victim, three vengeful teenage girls toilet paper a boy's house, and Kyle discovers his favorite part of Halloween.
59	7	Season 6 Episode 7	November 2, 2015
A doctor performs surgery on a talented magician, six contestants compete in a workplace reality show, and David Wayne Starr chats with a news reporter about his middle school carnival. Guest Star: Kaskade
60	8	Season 6 Episode 8	November 9, 2015
Matt reveals his favorite TV show to Stephen, poker players face off again at the world championship, and George Lucas shares his final wishes.
61	9	Season 6 Episode 9	November 16, 2015
James' boss patiently pursues a casual conversation, Sherlock and Moriarty engage in a battle of genius wit, and the Guild of Adventurers help their friend prepare for a date.
62	10	Season 6 Episode 10	November 23, 2015
Jason races to arm himself for Cyborg Monday, Adam and Whitney share what they're grateful for on Thanksgiving, and a familiar spirit haunts Luke Skywalker.
63	11	Season 6 Christmas Special	December 7, 2015
It's a Very Merry Studio C Christmas Special! A department store decorates for Christmas a bit early, a brother and sister see the power of the Elf on the Shelf, and Mr. Ecklestone's student drivers take him on a snowy ride.
64	12	Season 6 Valentine's Day Special	February 8, 2016
It's Valentine's Day, and love is in the air! Stephen avoids Whitney's plague-filled kisses, Mallory thinks about changing her relationship status on Facebook, and the mad scientist does his best to ruin the romantic holiday.
65	13	Season 6 Episode 13	February 29, 2016
Stacey receives advice from Mother Wisdom, presidential candidates run into trouble after accepting dance-off questions from YouTube, and the worst cop ever shows how difficult it really can be to protect the community.
66	14	Season 6 Episode 14	March 7, 2016
An office employee discovers something gross under his seat, Dr. Shoemaker uncovers new findings from an elementary experiment, and Batman and Superman face off in court.
67	15	Season 6 Episode 15	March 14, 2016
A pregnant Whitney wigs out to Stephen, a couple finds unexpected shapes in the clouds, and a parents' lie comes unravelled in a matter of minutes.
68	16	Season 6 Episode 16	March 21, 2016
Dr. Carter's interrogation turns out to be very revealing, a cowboy gripes over changes in saloon music, and A-list extra Star Feraldo proves to be difficult to work with.
69	17	Season 6 Episode 17	March 28, 2016
In this Studio C Fairytale Special, Prince Phillip psyches himself up to kiss Sleeping Beauty, a narrator wreaks havoc in a story and the worlds of Harry Potter and The Lord of the Rings collide.
70	18	Season 6 Episode 18	April 4, 2016
Stephen's poor taste in music is exposed, Dr. Shoemaker's latest experiment goes horribly wrong, and feminists and masculinists find they have more in common than they thought.
71	19	Season 6 Episode 19	April 11, 2016
Adam fails to understand the true meaning of chocolate waffles, Karma strikes Mallory with full force, and the natives try to find a worthy sacrifice for their volcano god.
72	20	Season 6 Episode 20	April 18, 2016
It's the Season 6 Season Finale! Matt impersonates a priest as Whitney comes to confessional, Juan returns to help another vacationer relax, and Adam turns to drastic measures to administer CPR.

=== Season 7 (2016–17) ===
No. overall	No. in season	Episode title	Original release date
73	1	Season 7 Episode 1	October 1, 2016
Studio C Season 7 starts out with a BANG! Matt discovers who Jeremy really is, Gary decides he's had enough and quits the band, and Shay Carl presents the ins and outs of vlogging etiquette. Guest Star: Shay Carl as Johnny "The Vlogfather"
74	2	Season 7 Episode 2	October 10, 2016
Stephen has the worst nightmare ever, the Phantom of the Opera gets dating advice from his pals, and Brooklyn and Bailey help the girls face off against the boys in an epic dance battle.
75	3	Season 7 Episode 3	October 17, 2016
Stacey discovers the truth about where he came from, the Winslow brothers rob another train, and the Game of Life takes on a life of its own.
76	4	Season 7 Episode 4	October 24, 2016
Astronaut Mark Watney experiences problems with his first YouTube channel, Jason teaches Jeremy just how great the internet can be, and a game of Truth or Dare gets more daring than ever. Guest Star: Lucky Blue Smith as himself/model
77	5	Season 7 Halloween Special	October 31, 2016
Things get scary when Jeremy shops for a new piano, Matt's attempts at helping his baby get back to sleep go wrong, and the guys can't seem to understand Adam's Halloween costume.
78	6	Season 7 Episode 6	November 7, 2016
Matt sees colors for the first time and can't believe his eyes, a tour group at the Great Pyramid see more than they could have hoped for, and only one man can save the world when aliens attack. Guest Star: Shonduras as himself
79	7	Season 7 Episode 7	November 14, 2016
Harry Potter and the gang try using the Mirror of Erised again, Natalie adopts a strange new cat, and Jeremy struggles with getting picked last for the team.
80	8	Season 7 Episode 8	November 21, 2016
Hector tries his hardest to help his boss, The Great British Bakeoff contestants deal with their most difficult challenge yet, and the Cookie Monster gets pitched his craziest endorsement deal ever.
81	9	Season 7 Episode 9	November 28, 2016
Jason and Natalie try to take a simple family photo, the Charleston Brothers get help from the YouTube channel "What's Inside", and Spencer interviews for a job.
82	10	Season 7 Christmas Special	December 5, 2016
The kids make ornaments to hang on a tree, the family sits around the dinner table to share their favorite holiday traditions, and Kyle finally grows up, but not without some lingering problems.
83	11	Season 7 Episode 11	February 6, 2017
Adam finally receives his warrior name after months of training, a returned veteran surprises his son at school, and Coach Dupree leads his soccer team to victory.
84	12	Season 7 Episode 12	February 13, 2017
Stephen finally gets a kiss from his high school crush, Officer Williams keeps things in order at the park, and the real Cinderella meets his Prince Charming.
85	13	Season 7 Episode 13	February 20, 2017
Grandma J sets out to solve a court case, Jason's visit to Russia ends unexpectedly, and a teen movie theater employee discovers the best way to woo women. Guest Star: Matthias Fredrick
86	14	Season 7 Episode 14	February 27, 2017
The Lifestyle Vlog girls return with "amaze" parenting tips, the guys discover their lives are actually The Truman Show, and two drivers go head to head in an epic lip sync battle.
87	15	Season 7 Episode 15	March 6, 2017
Jeremy tries to rescue a man who is trapped, the national chess championship in won by a landslide, and YouTuber Mark Rober tries to help the victims of a plane crash on a deserted island. Guest Star: Mark Rober
88	16	Season 7 Episode 16	March 13, 2017
Adam listens to the sounds of the ocean through a seashell, the Dark Knight saves a woman from danger with a little help from his friends, and video game creators brainstorm their next big idea.
89	17	Season 7 Episode 17	March 20, 2017
Sleeping Beauty receives gifts from the three good fairies, an unusual teacher substitutes at a middle school, and pirates board a ship and take the captain hostage.
90	18	Season 7 Episode 18	March 27, 2017
Harry Potter bids his children farewell as they journey to Hogwarts, the guys go to a club to flirt with the ladies, and an investigation is conducted on the streets of Old London.
91	19	Season 7 Episode 19	April 3, 2017
H&R Block throws a party to celebrate the end of another tax season, while Mallory, Natalie and Jason get super dizzy.

=== Season 8 (2017–18) ===
No. overall	No. in season	Episode title	Original release date
92	1	Season 8 Episode 1	October 2, 2017
In this exciting first episode of Season 8, a fight starts when Stephen calls James by the wrong name, we meet a British stage actor playing Jeremy, and a crosswalk desperately wants some company. Note: This is the first episode to introduce Aaron Fielding, Dalton Johnson, and Tori Pence as the show's new feature cast members.
93	2	Season 8 Episode 2	October 9, 2017
Someone shares a little too much information in a team get to know you game, Jeremy wakes up from surgery believing he is a fish, and just when Adam thinks his love triangle is hard enough another person gets thrown in the mix.
94	3	Season 8 Episode 3	October 16, 2017
Jason shows the five stages of Netflix addiction, an 80's sitcom brings back big hair, and we take a look inside the planning committee for the upcoming Star Wars movies.
95	4	Season 8 Episode 4	October 23, 2017
A tourist is confused by a New York sandwich shop's service, Mo and Susan go on the worlds most awkward date, and Bad Karma returns.
96	5	Season 8 Episode 5	October 30, 2017
Matt, Jason and James try to impress girls with their cosplay, a young boy is haunted by a very unusual monster under his bed, and Joyce from Stranger Things continues to look for her son using any decorations she can think of.
97	6	Season 8 Episode 6	November 6, 2017
The worst ninja ever struggles to get the job done, Matt makes the poor choice of using a Groupon for his laser eye treatment, and a time traveler ruins a couple's proposal.
98	7	Season 8 Episode 7	November 13, 2017
Matt gets tricked by a story about sea snakes, Michelangelo gets feedback about his latest "graffiti", and things don't go as planned when Prince Phillip tries to kiss his true love.
99	8	Season 8 Episode 8	November 20, 2017
It's Studio C's 100th episode! Dalton takes his TSA job a little too seriously, Matt can't stop reading Tori's texts, and Jeremy ends up sharing a row a bloodsucking passenger.
100	9	Season 8 Episode 9	November 27, 2017
Matt needs advice from James about a girl, but James isn't listening, Batman and Dora take on Gotham City, and Belle is unimpressed after the Beast transforms.
101	10	Season 8 Christmas Special	December 4, 2017
James teaches us how to make a holiday Lobster Bisque, the gang tries to get away from Leo the Kiosk Salesman, and Adam and Natalie don't notice Matt outside in the snowstorm.
102	11	Season 8 Valentine's Day Special	February 12, 2018
Studio C has fallen in love! Natalie is diagnosed with being in love, Mal and Stacey can't seem to find the right words when they meet the "one", and Tori suffers through Valentine's Day alone, while her brother receives a lot of unwanted attention.
103	12	Season 8 Episode 12	March 12, 2018
This week we visit Middle Earth to find that Frodo is getting offered a little more help than he needs to get the ring to Mordor. Snape and Voldemort discuss how they first met on their YouTube channel, Matt is able to find the perfect match for his Puritan roommate, and Batman and Superman bond over their parents.
104	13	Season 8 Episode 13	March 19, 2018
In the latest episode of Voldemort and Snape's YouTube show, things get a bit crazy with wizarding world's favorite Every Flavor Beans! A children's library reading group seek justice for a murderous thumb, and Batman teams up with Dora the Explorer to catch an uncatchable villain!
105	14	Season 8 Episode 14	March 26, 2018
This week Stephen attempts to get a prisoner to talk by recreating a scene from Aladdin, The Dog Singer featuring Terry on the Flute makes his television debut on Farley Archer, and Snape and Voldemort take all things snake milk on their YouTube show.
106	15	Season 8 Episode 15	April 2, 2018
At a party, Adam tries to help Stacey check out his ex-girlfriend without her noticing. Meanwhile, Matt gets some negative feedback on his film script. A man gets to meet his organ donor, only to discover he may have donated a little too much, and Batman offers some advice to his adolescent Uber passenger.

=== Season 9 (2018–19) ===
No. overall	No. in season	Episode title	Original release date
107	1	Studio C Live From NYC	September 10, 2018
The entire Studio C gang is back and funnier than ever as they launch their ninth season with the help of SNL veteran Kenan Thompson. Note: Although it was the first episode to air on season 9, it was the last episode the original cast members filmed together on Studio C. Guest Star and Host: Kenan Thompson
108	2	Season 9 Episode 2	September 17, 2018
Two security guards fight insecurity, James hunts for his milk-stealing roommate, and Tori gets a little too involved in a strange couple's argument.
109	3	Season 9 Episode 3	September 24, 2018
Australia leads a counterattack against aliens, Matt tries to save Mallory from the gallows, and a pair of policemen interview some very unusual witnesses.
110	4	Season 9 Episode 4	October 1, 2018
A penguin has an existential crisis, Mario wants to go back to plumbing, and is the Prince finally ready for true love's kiss?
111	5	Season 9 Episode 5	October 8, 2018
Mallory goes on her first undercover mission, a joint Russian-American spy team has communication issues, and the Justice Rangers find a surprising new ally.
112	6	Season 9 Episode 6	October 15, 2018
Pharaoh's advisors plot to get back at Moses, Ann Withers starts a book club, and King Caiden's reign is threatened on the school playground.
113	7	Season 9 Episode 7	October 22, 2018
Adam gets a nasty concussion, the new escape room in town is surprisingly realistic, and a presidential candidate receives some incriminating photographs.
114	8	Season 9 Halloween Special	October 29, 2018
In this special Halloween episode, Jeremy and Mallory discover a mysterious door, the Devil judges Aaron's soul, and the town of Salem has more witches than it knows what to do with.
115	9	Season 9 Christmas Special	December 10, 2018
It's Christmas time for Studio C! Adam can't get his package open, Hannibal Lecter hosts a holiday party, and Santa teaches some YouTubers the true meaning of Christmas.
116	10	Season 9 Episode 10	February 4, 2019
Stacey and Mallory present an unusual science fair project, the Council of Mothers makes battle plans, and a cat burglar gets a little too invested in his persona.
117	11	Season 9 Valentine's Special	February 11, 2019
Love is in the air as Susan Weebers prepares for a romantic evening, James's proposal is upstaged, and a dating game show features an unusual contestant.
118	12	Season 9 Episode 12	February 18, 2019
Stacey sings about his ideal girl, Natalie needs to clean out her car, and Whitney's restless leg syndrome takes a terrifying turn for the worse.
119	13	Season 9 Episode 13	February 25, 2019
A blind martial arts master shows off his terrifying skills, Tom Riddle gets ready for the Yule ball, and a drill sergeant struggles to intimidate his new recruits.
120	14	Season 9 Episode 14	March 4, 2019
Matt rehearses for his date by talking to a puppet, James Bond faces the hardest choice of his career, and Tori is nervous to order her fast-food meal.
121	15	Season 9 Episode 15	March 18, 2019
A family dinner turns into a heated argument, Superman tries to take a day off, and Whitney finds a creative way to tell her roommates about her date.
122	16	Season 9 Episode 16	March 25, 2019
In this Season 9 grand finale, Natalie tries a new face-match app, a high school class learns about taxes, and Alfred interrupts Batman during a private moment. Note: This is the last episode to star the original ten cast members. This is also the last episode to have Dalton Johnson, Tori Pence, and Aaron Fielding as the featured cast. Fielding decided to leave Studio C to pursue other opportunities while Johnson and Pence were promoted as main cast members for the tenth season.

=== Season 10 (2019) ===
No. overall	No. in season	Episode title	Original release date
123	1	Season 10 Episode 1	September 30, 2019
Dalton and Tori set off on an adventure to recruit a new cast for Studio C. Investors check out Lin-Manuel Miranda's latest Broadway project about William Henry Harrison, the president that died after thirty days in office. Rapunzel is thrown for a loop when a prince climbs up her hair to join her in her tower. Finally, a standard union meeting is taken over by a troupe of soap opera actors.
124	2	Season 10 Episode 2	October 7, 2019
An attention-starved bystander intrudes on an urgent news story; Guy Fieri, who's on the quest for tasty food in the South, runs into a dive he can't escape; and an animatronic Abraham Lincoln puts a Disneyland heckler back in his place.
125	3	Season 10 Episode 3	October 14, 2019
Abraham Lincoln dishes out the honest truth on Say Yes to the Dress. Bigfoot infiltrates a group of Bigfoot hunters. A dimwitted mob member "takes care of" a snitch.
126	4	Season 10 Episode 4	October 21, 2019
An internet rabbit hole distracts a lawyer from his murder case. A couple swaps out their ordinary home for a glorified porta-potty. A musical virtuosos perform Beethoven's "Moonlight Sonata" on piano and melodica.
127	5	Season 10 Episode 5	October 28, 2019
After being brought to life by a mad scientist, Frankenstein is slammed with medical bills. An Unscented Place features a world in which the sense of smell can be very dangerous.
128	6	Season 10 Episode 6	November 4, 2019
Dora the Middle-Age Explorer's next adventure takes her into the world of dating apps. In another adventure, athletes sweat in a rainbow of colors. On The Today Show, Kathie Lee and Hoda Kotb both fail a personality test.
129	7	Season 10 Episode 7	November 11, 2019
Sick in bed, a kid is powerless to stop his mom from taking over his YouTube channel. The only thing worse than a natural disaster is the press conference about it. A family is torn apart and drawn together in this Home School Musical.
130	8	Season 10 Episode 8	November 18, 2019
Grandpa Joe turns on everyone when Charlie invites him to Wonka's Chocolate Factory. Mary Poppins is hired by the Banks children to work in their office. Chopin's "Prelude in E minor" is performed on a stylophone.
131	9	Season 10 Episode 9	November 25, 2019
Clark Kent struggles to meet his article's deadline for The Daily Planet. A group of boys meet covertly in an alleyway to dance to disco music. After summer break, Emily, Sarah, and Becky are shocked to see what puberty did to their crushes.
132	10	Season 10 Episode 10	December 2, 2019
A not so motivational speaker visits an elementary school. Communication breaks down at a college apartment when one roommate has strange meanings for common acronyms. Hansel and Gretel question the witch's cooking abilities and home life.
133	11	Season 10 Christmas Special	December 9, 2019
"The Bachelor" gets grilled by Mr. and Mrs. Clause. The Grinch experiences the side effects of a growing heart. Rudolf the red-nosed reindeer gets sued for defamation.

=== Season 11 (2020) ===
No. overall	No. in season	Episode title	Original release date
134	1	Season 11 Episode 1	April 6, 2020
An appendix tries to be included within the vital organs of the body. Two inflatable tube men at a car lot discuss the issues in their lives. Mr. Science is back to demonstrate the explosive activity of a volcano.
135	2	Season 11 Episode 2	April 13, 2020
A seemingly normal courtroom scene is transformed when the cast starts kissing each other. A one-dollar donation unwittingly commits a college student to fight Hunger. A customer tests the patience of a grocery checkout clerk with his determination to score free stuff. A hedge fund manager takes the stage at a slam poetry competition. A disgruntled sandwich shop employee has high expectations for her customers.
136	3	Season 11 Episode 3	April 20, 2020
A homeowner believes her house is haunted, but the ghost is even more haunted when he discovers that the Revolutionary War didn't go the way he thought it had. A middle schooler wonders if her appearance on a local cooking show is more of a punishment than a reward. And Belle is startled by the enchanted objects in Beast's castle, especially the one object no one ever talks about.
137	4	Season 11 Episode 4	April 27, 2020
Buckle up your rodeo belts, put on your best boots, and come on out to an old-fashioned, hoedown! Then brace yourself for a dramatic look at the lives of housewives on the prairie. Get caught up in a magic show with the finest magician and assistant around. Join a family and their newly found hitchhiker on a road trip. And test your mothering knowledge on the hit game show "Causes and Cures."
138	5	Season 11 Episode 5	May 4, 2020
The stakes are high, leading one ballroom dancer to lose control. Then, the Wright Brothers take control of the sky and the patrons of the sky in a historical documentary. And after falling on the subway tracks, a man's survival is left to strangers. Next, the secret to time travel is discovered, and King Henry VIII makes a special appearance on The Newlywed Game.
139	6	Season 11 Episode 6	May 11, 2020
Sometimes everything just seems to go wrong. A restaurant can't get an order right. Sherlock's infamous deductive reasoning doesn't help him talk to women. High schoolers attempt to rewrite Shakespeare. Four millennials can't make their way out of an escape room. And finally, a game night leaves two couples questioning their communication skills.
140	7	Season 11 Episode 7	May 18, 2020
A breakroom is home to two cryogenically frozen heads. Unable to handle the grief, a man tries to liven up a funeral with a game of Twister. An innovative alarm clock keeps users from hitting snooze. While getting her hair done, a bride unwittingly meets a new wedding guest. A workplace is overtaken by puppet leadership. Two naive policemen ruin a crime scene.
141	8	Season 11 Episode 8	June 1, 2020
A sitcom is filmed in front of a live studio audience consisting entirely of dogs. Hero dog Lassie, debates conspiracy theories rather than rescuing Timmy. The great and powerful Oz turns out to be talk-show host, Dr. Oz. Caught in his tracks, a criminal alleges that Scooby-Doo is the real monster. Red Riding Hood's words are her greatest defense against The Big Bad Wolf. Cruella Deville's henchmen realize that they're not up to the job they've been given.
142	9	Season 11 Episode 9	June 8, 2020
A rocket ship malfunction leaves two astronauts stranded in a strange world. A medieval tournament is won by a unique knight and his exceptional emotional intelligence. A traditional wedding bouquet toss gets awkward when there's only one single woman in the crowd. In classic operatic fashion, the cast addresses fan theories regarding cast relationships. In honor of the show's hard-working crew, Ike and Jetta perform a touching song recognizing the many people who put their hearts into the show.
143	10	Season 11 Episode 10	June 15, 2020
A murder trial is derailed when the court-appointed counsel is a stereotypical old southern lawyer. A dying pirate captain describes where to find his buried treasure, unfortunately, his first mate doesn't speak pirate. Three women are quickly disenchanted with an automatic bathroom, as every piece of technology malfunctions. A marriage proposal is interrupted by every romantic movie cliché. Out of money, Garet and Matthew present a sketch without a set, props, costumes, or their fellow cast members.

=== Season 12 (2020) ===
No. overall	No. in season	Episode title	Original release date
144	1	Season 12 Episode 1	October 5, 2020
Dalton is kidnapped. The Style Gurlz try to kick Julian out of the band. A couple celebrates by splurging on a fine bottle...of milk. A cooking show's secret ingredient is explosive. DMV patrons try to register their "trucks."
145	2	Season 12 Episode 2	October 12, 2020
Class erupts with frog dissections. A teen's is transformed by braces. A janitor keeps interrupting. Actors learn to expect geese on set. One band member is not crush-able. Bryson Brunson, Wayne Brady's Comedy IQ winner guest stars.
146	3	Season 12 Episode 3	October 19, 2020
A wedding can't get off to the right start. Sports commentators are invested in the mascot. Ron has unfinished business before going to heaven. A high school drama teacher plans a flash mob. Captain Hook is horrified by his nickname.
147	4	Season 12 Episode 4	October 26, 2020
At Halloween, nothing is as it seems on Studio C. A bed and breakfast loses its charm. One man believes his mattress is evil; another battles a leaf blower. A woman celebrates her birthday. A man walks into a murder mystery.
148	5	Season 12 Episode 5	November 2, 2020
A paperboy and a milk delivery girl team up. A messenger is easily distracted from delivering news. An actor doesn't understand green screens. A wedding party gets carried away decorating the car. A psychology instructor gets dramatic.
149	6	Season 12 Episode 6	November 9, 2020
The President test the limits of his power. The Shmandrew Sisters are exhausted from their tour. A kid on a bike shows off for some unfortunate passersby. Love overcomes all, including airport security. An actor refuses to ride horses.
150	7	Season 12 Episode 7	November 16, 2020
Tourists meet performers on the subway. An emotional father officiates at his daughter's wedding. A detective refuses to let a witness give him information. Three family men are ready for a night out. A man dramatically quits his job.
151	8	Season 12 Episode 8	November 23, 2020
A weatherman gets rattled. An overly confident server trains a new employee. An appraiser destroys the value of everything. Army recruits don't understand their drill sergeant insults. An adult visiting his parents gets tucked into bed.
152	9	Season 12 Episode 9	November 30, 2020
An average guy's podcast changes the world. Blood donation becomes a competition. Copying a key is magical. Andrew Lloyd Webber writes an oddly specific show about eggs. Women at a business conference share their successes.
153	10	Season 12 Episode 10	December 7, 2020
Complete with musical numbers, special guests, corporate sponsors, and a visit (or four) from the big man himself, Studio C presents a Christmas variety show replete with nostalgia and laughs as they explore the meaning of the holiday.

=== Season 13 (2021) ===
No. overall	No. in season	Episode title	Original release date
163	1	Season 13 Episode 1	February 8, 2021
When jokes fail to land, mission control steps in to bring the sketch safely home. A grisly executioner employs unconventional methods to get his job done. Ezekiel Browngoat's incredible business success has brought him unthinkable sorrow. Often overlooked by sports enthusiasts, two devoted speed walkers demonstrate their athleticism. In a rare, subtitled, event a baseball team reveals what they're really communicating with their sly hand signals. As a cruise ship sinks, a less than heroic captain oversees the vessel's evacuation.
164	2	Season 13 Episode 2	February 15, 2021
Cupid gets his heart broken while hosting this special Valentine's episode of Studio C. A waitress thinks a man is being mean to his girlfriend. A girl interferes in her best friend's relationship. Romance fizzles as a promposal turns into a war. Heartbroken teenagers drown their sorrows in increasingly gigantic pizzas. A dad's attempts to intimidate his daughter's boyfriend are undercut when he can't stop giggling.
165	3	Season 13 Episode 3	February 22, 2021
A young man recounts the story of how he came to live in a bird's nest. To attract value-seeking riders, Uber rolls out a new option—student drivers. When the Tooth Fairy's daughter loses a tooth, a unique fairy appears. A confident spy confronts a bank robber and ends up jumping to conclusions. A rock band is unprepared for the audience's response to their hype act. A new manager becomes insecure whenever his subordinates mention their old boss.
166	4	Season 13 Episode 4	March 1, 2021
An entire family gets involved when a teen daughter's date arrives. The first ever Westminster Cat Show leaves judges with a tough decision. A kidnapped grandmother proves to be more than her captors bargained for. Maria's attempt to teach the Von Trapp children about music leads to an existential crises. Fast food staff intervene in the life of a customer. An aspiring screenwriter meets with Hollywood executives who have a few notes on her script. Three cursed kids attend a birthday party.
167	5	Season 13 Episode 5	March 8, 2021
When death comes for Ethel, she puts up a fight. A man can't fight his urge to sniff and taste every questionable item in his fridge. Three cursed kids compete in a track meet. Never-before-seen footage captures the very first car accident ever. A high school basketball coach is obsessed with getting doused with Gatorade at the end of a game. An artist includes himself in every piece he creates, resulting in increasingly disturbing artwork. A woman becomes overly excited watching a man use the change machine in a hotel lobby.
168	6	Season 13 Episode 6	March 15, 2021
An astronaut steps onto the Martian surface as the world awaits her first words. A city council meeting in Florida becomes extra chaotic when an unexpected visitor shares its concerns. A Jack-in-the-box terrorizes three cursed kids. A traveler seems completely caught off guard by the existence of the TSA and their air travel policies. A radio show is interrupted when the host's daughter calls in with a special request. A floundering toy company seeks to create a toy that will revolutionize the world.
169	7	Season 13 Episode 7	March 22, 2021
Matthew and Tanner battle it out for the title of best hair on Studio C. Arvin pranks Dalton. An embattled spaceship crew tries every theoretical way to evade their enemies. New parents visit the hospital nursery for the first time. Chuck Meegan recruits Garet as the spokesman for his new product. Judge Judy puts herself on trial. A witch gathers old friends for a party that turns out to be a multi-level marketing pitch.
170	8	Season 13 Episode 8	March 29, 2021
Guy Fieri rolls into town and faces off against an imposter claiming to be him. King Arthur and his squire seek an audience with the Lady of the Lake and get an unladylike surprise. Bob Ross has prunes on his mind and on his canvas. An exhausted, sick, and somewhat delusional poet captures his feelings about America and its scenery. An orphan girl shares her dearest and highly unique dreams with fellow orphans. A man with a truck load of generators hijacks a shop-from-home television broadcast.
171	9	Season 13 Episode 9	April 5, 2021
Cast members show where they find sketch ideas. A dad brings snakes to career day. A cop experiences an existential crisis. A dairy farmer becomes suspicious that his cows are trying to steal his identity. A kid is cyberbullied.
172	10	Season 13 Episode 10	April 12, 2021
A wild west folk ballad reveals the truth about the rugged frontier settlers in a town. Co-workers face off for the title of office funny guy. A producer and director are awestruck by an actor's audition. A regency era mother urges her daughters to calm themselves before their suitors arrive. A wealthy couple's love is put to the test when they encounter financial hardships. Chuck Meegan reveals his exciting plans for the future.

=== Season 14 (2021) ===
No. overall	No. in season	Episode title	Original release date
173	1	The Disappearance of Jason Gray	September 27, 2021
Excited to welcome back Jason Gray, the cast unfortunately mistakes him for an imposter and zaps him into a dimension governed by a mystical cat who does not want to help Jason return to season 14, where he belongs. Meanwhile, a group of scientists care more about seeing Schrodinger's cat than hearing him explain his famous theory. Before their heist, a sophisticated team of criminals assembles. When a break-in targets the dairy aisle, supermarket employees worry a milk freak is on the loose. A chorus of singing mechanics explains how camshafts and crankshafts work to a confused customer.
174	2	Surveilled It	October 4, 2021
Arvin's excited to perform his standup comedy routine, but he keeps getting interrupted by overly friendly audience members sharing insights into their lives. A rock climber dangles perilously while her rescuers surveil the scene. Studio C's senior Foley artist reveals where all of the show's sound effects come from. A new vacuum helps to put the hands on labor back into housework. A grief stricken family showcases why they were each their departed grandma's favorite. A man at a retreat has an emotional breakthrough that some find disturbing.
175	3	Recommended by 5/5 Dentists	October 11, 2021
Self-deputized to oversee the audience's safety, Jetta accidentally gets locked out of the studio and must find a way back in before the show ends. As she struggles, a pair of tourists are also struggling to understand what some Cockney shopkeepers are trying to sell them. An ambitious brand representative hopes to finally have her products endorsed by five out of five dentists. The owner of a professional football team decides to go undercover as a member of his team. And a father makes a scene by wearing his most expensive shoes to his daughter's wedding.
176	4	Flippa The Pancake	October 18, 2021
A television journalist is determined to prove that he can play football as well as former pros. A chess championship illustrates why chess isn't just a game -- it's a sport for the bravest competitors. Construction workers building a house must "B"e alert during their break. Dalton discovers the Earth shattering truth that his entire life has been a lie, created for the entertainment of others. A trendy breakfast restaurant helps customers face their day.
177	5	Edgar Allan Crow	October 25, 2021
Edgar Allan Poe has prepared to host a chilling episode of Studio C, but things go awry when he and his pet crow Butterbean touch a cursed amulet at the same time, switching bodies. Stuck in the body of his crow, the famed author stands helpless while his tales of terror elicit laughter as three teenage ghosts from the 80's appear in the mirror of a women's bathroom. A prosecutor examines Frank N. Stein, who describes what he saw on the night of the monster mash. A millennial receives a chilling phone call from her boomer father, relentlessly seeking to log into his Hulu account. And finally, after losing their website domain name, the famed Ghostbusters have no choice but to turn their attention to eradicating menacing goose problems. Guest appearance: Ike Flitcraft
178	6	Rat Tail	November 1, 2021
The Studio C cast unites to confront one of the show's biggest issues -- Garet's hair. An intense poker game is facilitated by a card dealer whose skills are lost in the shuffle. Created for men, a new medication declares war on indigestion, without sacrificing manliness. Two New Yorkers bask in the glamour of their street front staycation. Another New Yorker has used their Big Apple street smarts to develop a unique form of self defense.
179	7	My Real Dad You Are Not	November 8, 2021
Studio C believes that knowledge is power, so we've prepared this highly educational episode just for you. Please sit down as a high school teacher delivers a motivational speech to his students. A renowned art critic evaluates a primitive painting. Children then turn to their microwave dinners to help teach them about emotional intelligence. Teens at a school assembly review how to protect against alien attacks. A father learns that taking his children to an action movie following their grandfather's death wasn't as terrible of an idea as it seemed. A now teenaged Grogu deals with the stresses of high school, dating, and acne.
180	8	At Peace With The Mess	November 15, 2021
Studio C's janitor needs to get things cleaned up and head home to his family, but a series of messy sketches test his patience and lead him on a journey of self discovery. First, a news report goes awry when a pen unexpectedly spurts ink. After granting wishes, a genie awkwardly lingers in his master's apartment. A school cafeteria erupts into a food fight unlike any other. A business meeting is continually interrupted by an employee who is determined to increase her water consumption. And finally, a bakery owner accidentally sells whipped cream pies to a group of mischievous clowns.
181	9	Boom Shaka Laka	November 22, 2021
Two boys are playing video games in the year 1995. When one of them says Boom Shaka Laka, a Terminator-type bounty hunter bursts in and zaps him with a laser gun. The bounty hunter explains to the second boy that Boom Shaka Laka is alien code.
182	10	The Christmas Special	November 29, 2021
Tucked in and snuggly in their bed, the cast of Studio C listens to their favorite Christmas tales about Scrooge, wrapping paper hacks, Giuseppe the Italian Elf, office Christmas parties, The Grinch, and Nicolas Cage.

=== Season 15 (2022) ===
No. overall	No. in season	Episode title	Original release date
183	1	With Special Guest Will Forte	March 14, 2022
Will Forte (Saturday Night Live, The Last Man on Earth) guest stars. A super villain's cat has a secret. A worker is stuck in a vat of cereal. Behind the scenes of the recording session for the Seinfeld theme song.
184	2	Dedicated to the Children	March 21, 2022
Jason Gray struggles in an unnecessarily complex warmup game. Cast members impersonate Tom Cruise, Billie Eilish, Chris Rock, Taylor Swift, Cher, Ariana Grande, Owen Wilson, Adam Driver and James Corden.
185	3	The Spy Who Hugged Me	March 28, 2022
FBI Agents canvas an apartment complex. A waitress compromises a spy mission. A defense program seeks funding. Journalists react to Apollo 13. Loki (Marvel Cinematic Universe) interviews Nick Fury. A hero's eating habits are revealed.
186	4	Live Action Studio C	April 4, 2022
Bob Iger reveals Disney’s newest live-action remake of Ratatouille. Loki interviews Doctor Strange. A driver claims his car turned invisible. Jason Gray finds a video he made in junior high school.
187	5	Tanner & The Deathly Hollers	April 11, 2022
A Hogwarts sorting ceremony leads to some unexpected pronouncements, including Tourette Syndrome and OCD. Mister Rogers and Mr. McFeely learn about the wonders of crayons. Jetta Juriansz snaps as her roommate says goodnight to everything in the room.
188	6	Studio C+	April 18, 2022
Jason Gray announces Studio C's all new streaming platform, Studio C+. "Shows" on the new app include Loki’s interview with Spider-Man, Garet Allen deciding what to wear, and a snappy West Side Story parody.
189	7	Daltline	April 25, 2022
Dalton Johnson hosts a "True Crime" edition of Studio C. Agent Brinlee (Jetta Juriansz) gets a suspect to reveal information. A clueless juror (Naomi Winders) can’t make up her mind. An Alexa smart speaker is a witness in a criminal case.
190	8	History That Surely Happened	May 2, 2022
John Hancock signs the Declaration so well that the founding fathers name signatures after him. Romeo and Juliet suffer through several rounds of spicy wings as they lie on their deathbed.
191	9	GOOOOOOAAAAAAALLLLLLLLL!!!!!	May 9, 2022
BYU Men's Basketball coach Mark Pope guest stars in this sports-themed episode. Pope subs in as director of the show. A soccer commentator can't wait to announce a goal. Tanner Gillman gives a rousing speech to puppies.
192	10	A Studio C Wedding	May 16, 2022
Jetta struggles to find a date to a wedding. A Christopher Nolan movie about a budding romance gets intense. The bride and groom have some confusion over names.

=== Season 16 (2022) ===
No. overall	No. in season	Episode title	Original release date
193	1	Special Guest Jon Heder	October 3, 2022
Jon Heder (Napoleon Dynamite) guest stars. Survey game contestants meet painful ends to wrong answers. Heder and Jason Gray try to get people to recognize them. Heder uses virtual reality to inadvertently ruin a party.
194	2	A Two of Diamonds	October 10, 2022
Jason and Naomi write "anonymous" complaints about each other. Hal and Andrew meet at summer camp and think they're long lost twins. Magician employees use magic to save a card factory. A basketball Coach is disappointed in his team.
195	3	One Measly Spider	October 17, 2022
A king needs distraction from the plague, but there's no talent still alive. The Duggins Movers promote their new spider-free travel agency. Two flight attendants make their safety demonstration more entertaining so it becomes viral.
196	4	Heart Attack on a Hoof	October 24, 2022
Kevin isn't happy when a new student is also named Kevin. Stan is a new cook and has to learn the diner lingo. A princess falls for a spam message. Oscar's "dog" makes people uncomfortable. Scouts recite a lengthened scout law.
197	5	Ha Ha Halloween	October 31, 2022
During a zombie apocalypse, every cast member but Tori admits to being bitten. Frankenstein creates the Bride to marry the Monster, but she wants to go on a date first. Dracula and monsters are pulled over while stealing from a blood bank.
198	6	Mall Presidents at the Mall	November 7, 2022
Nurses sing an alternative milk song to a lactose intolerant patient. Friends go meet the mall Lincoln on President's Day. A weight guessing game gets uncomfortable. Naomis from the future try to stop Naomi from dating Jason.
199	7	100% Cement	November 14, 2022
Blofield interrogates Bond, but her assistant is incompetent. A salesfeller gets two cowboys to buy his useless wares. Tim pitches his cement shoes to The Sharks. Dad gets a crazyboy chair for Christmas. Frank runs for mayor against a dog.

=== Season 17 (2023) ===
No. overall	No. in season	Episode title	Original release date
200	1	A Defective Detective	October 16, 2023
Kiri, Carl, and Aleta are the newest cast members. A noir detective is nothing without his lucky coin. A fast food worker in training meets another trainee. One Power Ranger fails to morph. Tori's off-brand virtual assistant has quirks.
201	2	An Admonishing Anthropologist	October 23, 2023
Women struggle to order a healthy meal. An anthropologist creates confusion. Dobby, newly freed, needs clothes. Parents attend their son's basketball game. Not all X-Men are equally gifted. A valedictorian improvises.
202	3	A Secret Scarecrow	October 30, 2023
The cast is horrified when the lights go out. A scarecrow tries to frighten trick-or-treaters. A vampire loves biting necks in the USA. A know-it-all werewolf offended. And Tori is convinced she's the pretty girl in a horror movie.
203	4	A Terrible Tailor	November 6, 2023
A teacher is late for his class. An adult tries to sell homemade Girl Scout Cookies. An employee loses his mind while filming a recruitment video. Tourists get a one of a kind suit. A man's birthday presents get creepier and creepier.
204	5	An Elderly Embezzler	November 13, 2023
Lisa Valentine Clark stars. A teleprompter is on the fritz. A podcast guest is interrupted by ads. Grandma Bunny is determined to help her grandson out. The cast learns what makes a podcast. A police officer trusts her instincts.
205	6	A Bossy Biker	November 20, 2023
A composer's win is upstaged by his ex-girlfriend. A man gets a lesson on motorcycle style. A picky eater hosts a cooking show. Military recruits were not trained for laundry. A couple visits a pet shop full of fancy pets.
206	7	A Belligerent Bowler	November 27, 2023
Mallory Everton and Megan Rico guest star. A space crew has to act fast while under attack. Not all Olympic athletes are the same. Blowing a kiss becomes complicated. Luggage gets damaged on a flight. Marvel introduces obscure characters.
207	8	A Snowy Stuntman	December 4, 2023
Jason Gray waits for Santa to arrive. A gag gift becomes highly sought after at a gift exchange. Kids build a magical snowman who craves high octane thrills. Santa visits Career Day. A teenager receives a unique car.

=== Season 18 (2024) ===
No. overall	No. in season	Episode title	Original release date
208	1	200th Episode Extravaganza	March 3, 2024
The cast is joined by the original cast for an hour-long epic special commemorating Studio C's 200th episode. Favorite characters make appearances, actors improvise, and tongues get twisted in this celebration of sketch comedy.
209	2	Delicious and Litigious	March 10, 2024
Two waiters educate diners. A grocery pickup order has a few substitutions. A robber is sidetracked by Bluey. Sue Baker will sue anyone. Students confused micro fiction with advertisements. A man makes a Shark Tank pitch for sharks.
210	3	Piles for Miles	March 17, 2024
A newsroom is full of new rhymes. The news in Hawkins, Indiana is upside down. A visitor has interesting Thanksgiving traditions. A new movie focuses on piles of dirt. A clueless teen finds a Genie's lamp. Q makes spy gadgets for a woman.
211	4	Bummer for a Plumber	March 24, 2024
Luigi is tired of being in Mario's shadow. Was an old man's death murder? A salesman launches a crazy sale. A zoo patron wants to dress the animals. An opera singer is out of breath. Parents have detailed instructions for the babysitter.
212	5	HR for Hamsters	March 31, 2024
Dalton performs his version of "drivers license." A detective turns in their badge, gun, and everything else. A man an unwanted nickname. Ethics students think literally. A woman asks for job advice from a human sized hamster.
213	6	Lies for Little Ones	April 7, 2024
Citizens want to turn off the internet. A space traveler struggles to readjust. A woman confronts her parents lies. The graphics at a bowling alley are odd. An undercover agent's disguise involves skates. Mallory Everton guest stars.
214	7	Regrets for Refs	April 14, 2024
The biggest snake and reptile show is complete with a giant glass ball full of snakes. Imagine a spa for dads, by dads. Indiana Jones isn't prepared for his adventure. Dr. Jekyll is bad at adulting. And a poor ref struggles with his job.
215	8	Human Heads for Horses	April 21, 2024
The cast learns that a big producer is coming to their show. A soap opera is filled with product placement. A man wakes up with a surgical surprise. It's the most uplifting movie you'll ever see. Reanimating Grandpa doesn't go as expected. Jeremy Warner guest stars.

=== Season 19 (2024) ===
No. overall	No. in season	Episode title	Original release date
216	1	Help! I Can't Get Out!	October 14, 2024
Bella grapples with Edward's age. An airline's safety video addresses hurtful allegations. A woman is trapped in a parking garage. A barista tries to fill a large order for puppuccinos. A wife dislikes her husband's singing fish.
217	2	Emotional Damage with Steven He	October 21, 2024
A lounge singer gives a fan too much attention. A critical father ridicules his injured son. A family orders a budget headstone. War is averted by dance. A therapist leads a group in facing their fears. Steven He guest stars.
218	3	Marty! Marty! Marty! Marty! Marty!	October 28, 2024
A romantic encounter becomes awkward. Three sisters with different businesses share an office. Doc Brown is overly invested in the McFly family. A detective solves the murder of a duchess. After a coma, a young woman notices some changes.
219	4	You've Been Betrayed	November 4, 2024
An instructor loves his videos. A woman buys an air fryer. A rookie surgeon has a realization about school. A reality show keeps you guessing and leaves you confused. A new employee fails a CAPTCHA. An introduction to Thumbelina's twin.
220	5	Nagini Weenie Baby	November 11, 2024
The Apollo 11 crew has a lot of firsts. After threatening Hogwarts, the Dark Lord forgets to hang up. A new medication fights all types of colds. A timeshare sales agent has a secret weapon. A mother seeks medical attention for her son.
221	6	She's a Witch!	November 18, 2024
A dog trainer has a unique way of working with her animal on set. A woman competes for free tires. A damsel must sacrifice herself to a dragon to save everyone. Cleda is unfairly accused of being a witch. A groom must prove himself.
222	7	I'm So Sorry It Didn't Work Out With Terry Crews	November 25, 2024
Waking from cryosleep, a man struggles to accept all that he's lost. Zeus assigns gods to their dominions. A man must catch his friends. A clueless husband receives recognition. A man tries self-checkout. Terry Crews guest stars.

=== Season 20 (2025) ===
No. overall	No. in season	Episode title	Original release date
223	1	I Know You're Not Real with Jack McBrayer	March 3, 2025
A dwarf's puzzling name. A secretive actor. A talking tree. An eye exam. Jack McBrayer guest stars.
224	2	Grimjaw and the Good Kid Gang	March 10, 2025
A creature. A will reading. A baby name. A cash business. A fiscal crisis. A publicist's trick.
225	3	There's a Diamond for That!	March 17, 2025
Wedding objections. Oddly specific jewelry. PGA rules change. Powerful artichoke hearts.
226	4	Forty Years and Forty Nights	March 24, 2025
A snake bite. Another Earth. A criminal mastermind. Jimmy 2 returns! A sleep study.
227	5	Jake From Steak Farm	March 31, 2025
Randy Newman. A new restaurant. A migraine medication. A used couch. Fresh steaks.
228	6	Bongos for Your Soul?	April 7, 2025
Maria sings. Haunts spook. A soulful battle. A honeymoon trip. A spider bite. A CGI robot.
229	7	Ugh My Wife! with Will Forte	April 14, 2025
An alien. A gameshow. A waterslide. A description. A superhero. A new hire. Will Forte guest stars.

=== Season 21 (2025) ===
No. overall	No. in season	Episode title	Original release date
230	1	Pretty Pretty Dope with Josh Peck	October 13, 2025
A game is interrupted by an excited stranger. A man can't let go of clutter. Safety proves difficult during a solar eclipse. An outlaw is unprepared for shootout. A couple thinks they may have a house intruder. Josh Peck guest stars.
231	2	I Have Never Paid My Taxes Right	October 20, 2025
Henry's stuck in a time loop. A taunt battle turns creepy. He's an "alpha," a "grinder," and a "mindset mogul." A guest shares her harrowing story. Friday got freakier when mom and daughter swapped arms instead of bodies.
232	3	Musical Orphan Cleaners	October 27, 2025
A new cleaning service brings Broadway into your living room. A tongue-tied chef commands his staff. A customer service professional showcases her skills. A school teacher challenges her students to dream big. Manny from Manila returns.
233	4	Beauty and MrBeast	November 3, 2025
Guests have surprising party ideas. Sephora's new anti-aging product is very powerful. MrBeast turns a fairy tale into a content castle. A dog has opinions about a proposal. A scientific anomaly is explained by a diner full of patrons.
234	5	There's A Rat In The Chat	November 10, 2025
Superman's fortress becomes less solitary. A witness in court proves unreliable. When their spot is out of commission, mobsters meet via Zoom. A co-worker insists on drama. New monks take a vow of silence.
235	6	I'm Manifesting You Zip Your Lips with Pierson	November 17, 2025
Two women try manifesting. A flight attendant calls for a doctor. A book club dives into legendary dip. A homeschooler feels out of place. Dorothy finds herself in the wrong Oz. New discoveries destroy dino science. Pierson guest stars.
236	7	Worst Funeral Director Ever	November 24, 2025
Superman meets his French counterpart. Employees gather for a trust workshop. A funeral director is terrible at his job. An eager woman wants a kiss under the mistletoe. Summer love is foiled by a prized possession.

=== Season 22 (2026) ===
No. overall	No. in season	Episode title	Original release date
237	1	I'm Dead Part 435 with Rainn Wilson	April 9, 2026
A spaceship veers off course to settle a cosmic grudge. A man melts down over a brownie. A man launches a wild smear campaign. A family discovers dad's secret “death tape." An angel guides Naomi through Heaven. Rainn Wilson guest stars.
238	2	Alexa, I'll Kill You!	April 16, 2026
An Alexa goes rogue during date night. Mothers show how well they know their daughters. A weight lifter needs a spotter. A complicated board game overwhelms a group of friends. All the king's horses and all the king's men are summoned.
239	3	Seven Ate Nine	April 23, 2026
Philosophers order the alphabet. A film festival Q&A poses unexpected questions. In a true crime special, 7 is the suspect when 9 goes missing. A cop bribes witnesses for information. Tam Flank returns, but as an exterminator.
240	4	Salem Wizard Trials	April 30, 2026
Steve Jobs unveils the first iPhone. A joking dad can't handle a joking waitress. A man brands himself as a wizard instead of a witch. A woman tries to relate to her co-workers. Benjamin Franklin and son experiment with electricity.
241	5	It Smells Like Hotdog Water	May 7, 2026
A confusing customer holds up the Burger Barn line. A birthday cake hides a disturbing surprise. Draco dreams of serving Voldemort. A eulogy has to be improvised from a grocery list. A hot dog loving co-worker creates chaos.
242	6	Beef Lotion	May 14, 2026
Turbulence triggers a man's dying confessions. A restaurant has the most attentive staff. A dry-skinned dad finds a lotion manly enough for him. A woman summons Shaq to answer her questions. A parrot confuses a lovestruck woman.
243	7	Don't Get on That Plane!	May 21, 2026
A man begs his girlfriend not to board a plane. A woman has zero self-awareness at dinner. Nobody dares question the Don, even when no one knows what he's saying. A new indie singer lands a record deal. Steve Harvey hosts Jeopardy.

=== Season 23 (2026) ===
No. overall	No. in season	Episode title	Original release date
244	1	Have I Shocked You? with Pete Holmes	October 19, 2026
A man tries out a beard. A husband reveals his wife's secrets. Phil Swift shows how Flex Tape can fix everything. The perfect first kiss needs some work. An eccentric billionaire takes his girlfriend to dinner. Pete Holmes guest stars.
245	2	Swiss Polka Demon Hunters	October 26, 2026
Swiss polka stars fight dairy intolerant demons. Halloween complicates a car crash. There's an unexpected visitor in the Spider-Verse. Couples have differing opinions about Toy Story. Count Dracula is having problems with his bite.
246	3	Bring Out The Brads	November 2, 2026
A family finds a bargain cruise. A man waits in the airport arrival area. A mom enthusiastically uses bug spray. The big bad wolf gets an unexpected reaction from a little pig. A woman on a dating show must choose between three bachelors.
247	4	Elmo Doesn't Feel Anything Anymore	November 9, 2026
Cinderella's friends make her a beautiful gown. Gossipers are overheard in the bathroom. Freddy Fazbear's Pizza is re-opening. A girl dad wants to change Star Wars. Cookie Monster is cutting his consumption thanks to three letters.
248	5	A Battle of Wits	November 16, 2026
249	6	I'm Sick of Your Garbage Mouth with Angela Kinsey	November 23, 2026
250	7	It's Christmas, Laugh A Little	November 30, 2026

=== Specials ===
No. overall	No. in season	Episode title	Original release date
1	1	The Best of Studio C	October 5, 2013
Enjoy the best skits from Season 1 and 2.
2	2	Season 1 Favorites	November 28, 2013
Along with whitty commentary from the cast, Studio C brings you the Top 10 favorite sketches from Season 1, including "P90X," "Google Translator" and "Dana's Dead."
3	3	Season 2 Favorites	November 28, 2013
Tune in to watch the Studio C cast give fun remarks on the Top 10 sketches from Season 2, including "Gandalf Intervention," "Drivers Ed," and "Poker Face."
4	4	Cast Favorites	November 28, 2013
Tune in to watch the Studio C cast give fun remarks on the Top 10 sketches from Season 2, including "Gandalf Intervention," "Drivers Ed," and "Poker Face."
5	5	How to make your own Studio C	April 5, 2014
The cast and crew of Studio C will walk you through a step by step process in making your own sketch comedy TV show.
6	6	Off-Set	April 5, 2015
Gather everyone together to watch as the cast of Studio C show their favorite off-set sketches and talk about what went in to filming them. They even debut a brand new sketch you can't find anywhere else. This is something you won't want to miss.
7	7	October Conference Special	October 3, 2015
Join the cast as they share brand new sketches in this Fall Favorites special episode. Stacey asks Matt to be his emergency contact, a group of teenage boys pick up their unique dates for prom, and a peculiar interruption derails a frat initiation ceremony.
8	8	Studio C at the Movies: The Reel World	April 1, 2017
Grab the popcorn, hit the lights, and enjoy a reimagined lineup of all the best movie-themed sketches. See what happens when your favorite movie characters enter the reel world, Studio C style!
9	9	Studio C at the Movies: Going Off Script	April 1, 2017
Grab the popcorn, hit the lights, and enjoy a reimagined lineup of all the best movie-themed sketches. See what happens when Studio C movie characters go behind the scenes and off script!
10	10	Best Of Christmas	December 12, 2022
The Christmas rush impedes Scrooge's purchase of a turkey. The Grinch's heart dangerously grows three sizes instantly. A family fends off their Cousin Kevin during the Christmas season. By the time Bennet proposes, Ellie is frozen stiff.
11	11	Best of Back to School	February 27, 2023
A parody of High School Musical with homeschooled students; a class of 3rd graders rob a zoo; a glimpse into the life of Teen Yoda; Miss Frizzle's Performance Review; High School present a contemporary version of Romeo and Juliet.
12	12	Best of Sports	February 27, 2023
A rookie commentator. A soccer match comes down to Scott Sterling. Elderly football team owner goes undercover. Gymnastics parents perform their own routine. Skate Park Disaster. Scott Sterling is BACK. Chess game spins out of control.
13	13	Best of TV Parodies	February 27, 2023
Studio C is sketch comedy for the whole family. With Jason Gray, Garet Allen, Arvin Mitchell, Dalton Johnson, Tori Pence, Naomi Winders, Megan Rico, Joe Balanza, Gabby Moore, and Jericho Lopez.
