= Freelancers (TV series) =

American web television series

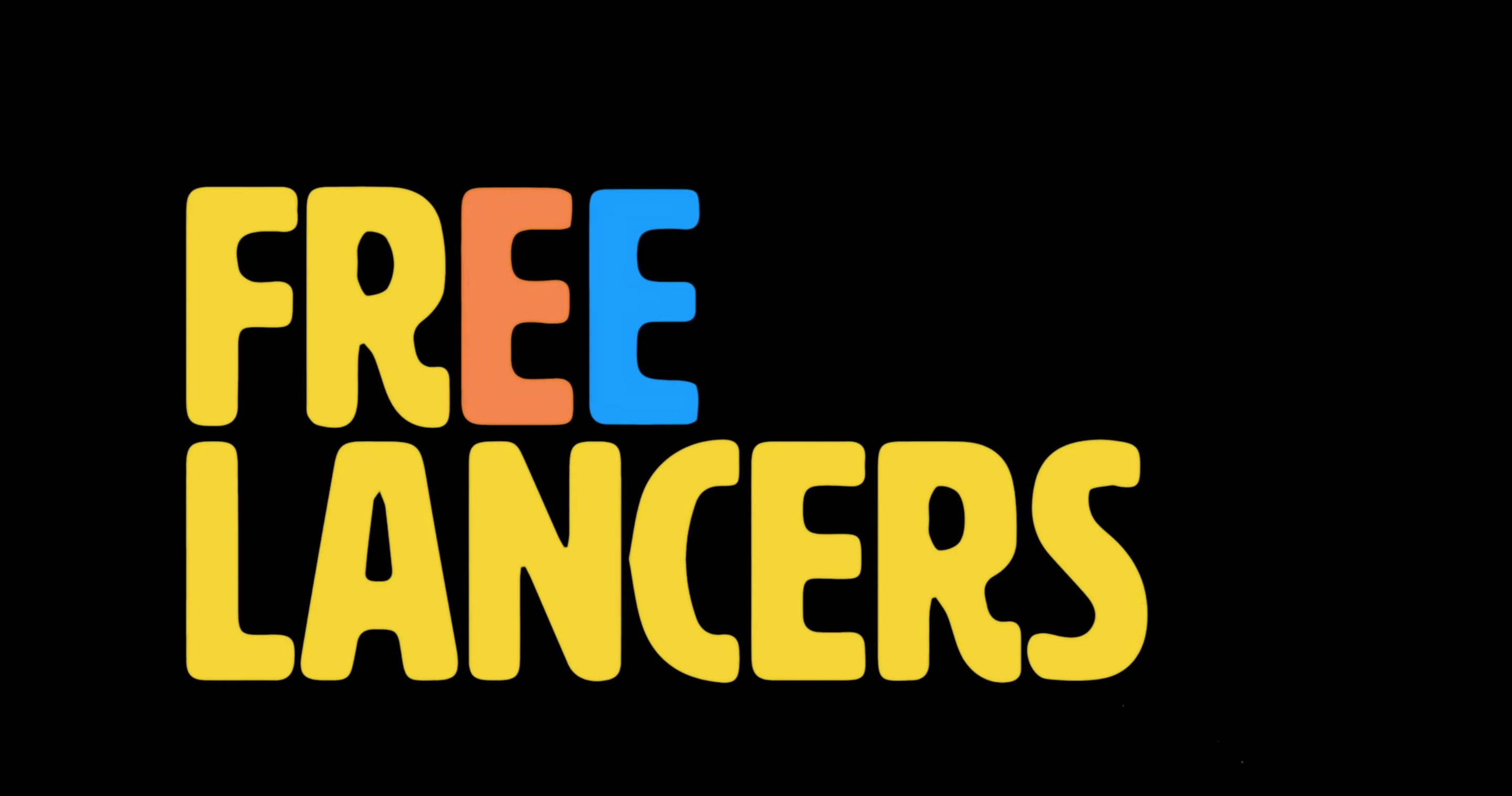
- Genre: Television comedy
- Created by: Mallory Everton
- Starring: Whitney Call; Mallory Everton; Stacey Harkey; Stephen Meek; Matt Meese
- Opening theme: "Wicket Youth" by Sego
- Composer: God Dog
- Country of origin: United States
- Original language: English
- No. of seasons: 2
- No. of episodes: 16 (+ 1 special)

Production
- Executive producers: Candis Meredith; Stephen Walter; Natalie Madsen; Mallory Everton
- Producers: Stephen Meek; Phillip Goodwin; Michael Potter
- Cinematography: Brenna Empey; Brandon Christensen
- Editors: James Perry; Drew Duncan; Mallory Everton; Jeremy Warner; Jonah Blaine
- Camera setup: Multi-camera
- Running time: 9-25 minutes
- Production companies: JK! Studios; ClickFunnels; Heck Video; Angel Studios

Original release
- Release: March 28, 2019 – December 16, 2021

Freelancers is an American comedy web television series created by Mallory Everton for JK! Studios. Shot in Provo, Utah, the first season premiered on YouTube on March 28, 2019, and concluded after eight episodes on May 23, 2019. In December 2020, an investment campaign was launched to produce a second season; its $1 million target was reached the following January. The eight-episode second season premiered on the Angel Studios app on November 4, 2021.

== Synopsis ==
Five broke millennials struggle to build their video production company because of their limited resources, lack of experience, and living in a small, quirky town.

— JK! Studios

== Cast and characters ==
- Whitney Call as Arizona "Zona" Goodwin, the creator and producer of the video production company, Video Production Company. Her backstory is unknown.
- Mallory Everton as Devin Mann, the editor for Video Production Company. Once had a job in a circus where she dressed as a clown and ate raw beef cubes as people guessed her credit score. She has excellent combat skills.
- Stacey Harkey as Micah Pratchett, the light, sound, and make-up artist for Video Production Company. He cannot hold his breath for over seven seconds.
- Stephen Meek as Owen Darby, the director for Video Production Company. He is known for his microstomach
- Matt Meese as Ryan Mcloud, the camera operator for Video Production Company. Well-liked by all, but the least intelligent and most naïve character on the show. has a grandma who calls him "moose", possibly as a reference to Matt Meese's last name. In one timeline, he dies from an exploding camera dipped in gasoline.

Additional cast members include Natalie Madsen as Joan, James Perry as Frank Butts, Jason Gray as Little Harry and the Jaded Clown, Tori Pence as Miriam, Adam Berg as Mr. Doyle, and Jeremy Warner as Mr. Nightmare. Jeffrey Lee Blake has a recurring role as Mr. Gandolfini, the group's weird neighbor, and Ruth Clarke makes an appearance as Ryan's grandma.

== Episodes ==
=== Series overview ===
Season	Episodes	Originally released	
Season	Episodes	First released	Last released
1	8	March 28, 2019	May 23, 2019
S	1	December 19, 2019	
2	8	November 4, 2021	December 16, 2021

=== Season 1 (2019) ===
No.	Title	Directed by	Written by	Original release date
1	"Video Production Company"	Jeremy Warner	Mallory Everton	March 28, 2019
The Video Production Company crew, consisting of Arizona "Zona" Goodwin, Devin, Micah, Owen, and Ryan, present a pitch video to Tesla, Inc. offering to make an ad for them; Tesla refuses. Later, at their house, Zona and Devin are confronted by Joan, a Krispy Kreme employee who wants Zona to return as a sign dancer. Zona refuses the offer, stating that she wants to follow her dreams. Later, the group shoots an office safety demonstration video for Sales Solution, which accidentally results in the presenter, Frank Butts, being stabbed in the shoulder with a pen. This results in the group having to raise $4,000 by the end of the day to pay the insurance bill, or having to be sued by Mr. Butts. While searching for money, Zona encounters Joan, who offers to give her a full-time job at Krispy Kreme and the money they need to pay the insurance bill. She accepts the deal by signing a contract and receives the money to pay Mr. Butts. Joan leaves but returns when she finds out Zona signed with the wrong name, only for Owen to eat the contract before Joan can do anything. Joan gets mad, throws a billboard at Zona, only to miss, and stab Mr. Butts.
2	"Cursed"	Jeremy Warner	Adam Berg	April 4, 2019
After telling them she has no money, the group tells Miriam the Medium they will not work for her. Furious, Miriam decides to put a curse on them. The next day, Micah remains the only person who believes they are cursed, and Zona and Owen visit their new client, Big Harry's Pancake House. That same day, Micah experiences bad luck with everything he does, Devin spends $10,000 on ads instead of the $100 she was given, Ryan finds a creepy doll who gives him candy, and Zona and Owen find out Big Harry's owner, Big Harry, was murdered and his recipe was stolen. The group goes to talk to Miriam, who refuses to lift the curse, so they decide to curse her as well. The next day, Miriam visits them, tells them she will lift her curse on the condition they lift theirs, and they agree. Instantly, all of the group's problems disappear, and someone buys the group's website, giving them a profit. Ryan becomes sad when the doll that gave him candy disappears, and Big Harry's son, Little Harry, is revealed to have killed his father, only to be arrested when he yells he "killed his father for nothing" when the recipe slips out of his hand, which he blames on the curse.
3	"Karate!"	Jeremy Warner	Matt Meese	April 11, 2019
Owen begins to argue with Zona when she says Danny Devito is the coolest client they could have. devin holds her breath the whole time. Later, Zona becomes envious when she finds out the boys created a karate group without her, and Devin announces she bought a new scooter, which someone keeps knocking over while she is not looking. At night, the boys go for a walk to search for criminals while wearing ninja masks, and Devin, believing a raccoon is knocking over her scooter, stays outside to watch. Devin notices the boys doing ninja moves and believes they are responsible for knocking over her scooter. She follows them and beats them up. Once everyone regroups, Zona reveals she hired Mr. Gandolfini to knock over the scooter, knowing Devin would fight the suspects, all because she was still mad about the Danny Devito thing. Though disappointed in her, the group forgives Zona, and they take Owen to the ER.
4	"Love Match Supreme"	Jeremy Warner	Mallory Everton	April 25, 2019
The group pitches their jingle for the Love Match Supreme dating app to the CEO of the company, Mr. Doyle, only for Micah to mess up the lyrics. Mr. Doyle, who does not find the group right for the job, decides to give them another chance, on the condition they bring dates to the Valentine's Day dance hosted by the company. Everyone tries their best to find a date, but only Owen succeeds. Owen tells them he found his date on Love Match Supreme, and the rest of the group decides to create dating profiles on the app.
5	"Love Match Supreme Part 2"	Jeremy Warner	Mallory Everton	May 2, 2019
After creating dating profiles, everyone except Zona find dates for the dance almost immediately. On the day of the dance, Zona still has not found a date and decides to swipe right on everyone, only to get matched with a hideous man named Merlin. At the dance entrance, everyone except Zona finds out they have been catfished by Mr. Gandolfini, and together, they decide to enter the dance holding hands. Once inside, Mr. Doyle tells the group they will not be making the ad, but once Merlin arrives, Mr. Doyle takes it back and allows the group to make the ad. The group celebrates by singing the jingle, only for Micah to mess up the lyrics again, and for Mr. Doyle to fire them.
6	"Circus Berserkus"	Jed Wells	Whitney Call	May 9, 2019
While filming an ad for the Circus Berserkus haunted house Nightmare on 13th, Zona questions Mr. Nightmare, the Circus Berserkus owner, on why he avoids paying for the ad. Mr. Nightmare responds by telling them he added a section to the waiver they signed, where it states they need to complete the haunted house to receive payment. At the haunted house, the group splits up. Owen begins to breakout and searches for concealer, Zona develops a romantic interest for Chainsaw Boy, Micah and Ryan decide to pull pranks on the visitors when they find a clown mask, and Devin confronts her past as a circus clown who used to eat raw meat while people guessed her credit score. After being warned by the Jaded Clown to stop pulling pranks, Ryan accidentally pranks Devin and gets punched in the stomach. Ryan and Micah leave the haunted house, Owen finds concealer, and Zona finds out the Chainsaw Boy is underaged and leaves him. After the group leaves and receives their payment, two detectives enter the haunted house to find raw meat splattered around a room by Devin with the number "720" written on the wall multiple times.
7	"Power Outage"	Jeremy Warner	Matt Meese	May 16, 2019
The group finds out Micah did not mail a deposit he was given to pay for a location they were going to shoot a commercial at, and put him in the shame corner. At night, Owen reveals he has been texting a girl on Tinder while at the same time catfishing Mr. Gandolfini to make sure he does not catfish him again. Meanwhile, a rainstorm pours, and while Devin saves a big project to allow the group to be ahead of schedule, the power goes out. They agree to resave the project once the power comes back on, but the power outage continues for five more days. Owen goes outside to search for the girl on Tinder but fails. The rest of the group decides to use a stationary bicycle to get the electricity back but fails when Zona farts, so they put her in the shame corner. After the electricity comes back, Owen reveals he connected an extension cord to Mr. Gandolfini's generator, and the group finds out the project was saved. Owen opens the front door when he hears a knock and finds five ladies at the doorstep.
8	"CrossFit"	Jed Wells	Mallory Everton	May 23, 2019
After filming a commercial at a gym, the group is told by the gym trainer that he does not have the money to pay them as he has to pay for repairs on the sauna after Mr. Gandolfini broke it. Though he cannot pay, the gym trainer invites the group to a free day at the gym, alongside a free box of his own Mr. Pec's Peck Juice. The group workout all day at the gym, and are too sore to go to a gala the next day. Though they are all paralyzed, they manage to tell Mr. Gandolfini about their situation and are dressed-up by him. Ryan screams for his grandma, who arrives and drives the group to the gala.

=== Special (2019) ===
No.	Title	Directed by	Written by	Original release date
1	"A Freelancers Christmas"	Jeremy Warner	Matt Meese	December 19, 2019
On Christmas morning, Devin gifts Owen the camera she stole from him last year. She also gives Ryan an empty box, Micah two prank boxes, and Zona a watch. however, after filming an ad for foot doctor the musical, they are ready to quit. Mr. Gandalfini gifts the group a clock filled with demons and horrible songs and poetry. they fill a trash can with gasoline and their equipment when jenny, who left the group to get rich, comes as a ghost to warn the group to keep working their jobs by sending three spirits. the first spirit, Joan, explains she's in a coma and shows the group their start in the 80's, which surprises her. the second spirit is William, who is physically there and proves it by slapping Owen twice. he shows the group three recent jobs, which they did in the episodes "doodles Chips","legend quest", and "Learn, fun, can!" the final spirit is petunia, the creepy doll from "cursed", who shows the group that they will be grave diggers if they quit their jobs. the group repents of this, and they are returned "only" 36 hours after they first left. they call Mr. Gandolfini to accept a dinner invitation.

=== Season 2 (2021) ===
No. overall	No. in season	Title	Directed by	Written by	Original release date
9	1	"Student Body President"	Jeremy Warner	Matt Meese	November 4, 2021
William is the only student running for student body president at his high school. He hires the group to make a propaganda film to promote his campaign and offers to pay double their fee. With little to no money, the group agrees to make the commercial. In the process, Zona decides to run against William after deeming him a psychopath. Meanwhile, Ryan accidentally joins a classroom and becomes popular. He tells the rest of the school to vote for Zona and she wins.
10	2	"Zona and Bike Boy"	Neil Hiatt	Stephen Meek	November 4, 2021
A criminal is stealing cars around the city. Zona begins a relationship with a man named Jim, who Devin and Owen find to be suspicious. The police mistakenly arrest Micah and Ryan as the car burglars. The police let the pair go and later arrest Jim as the real car burglar.
11	3	"Wheel of Challenges"	Jeremy Warner	Adam Berg	November 18, 2021
The group's plumbing is broken and the plumber's cat is dead from old age. To resolve the issues of who gets the right to the one hot shower available each day, the wheel of challenges is pulled up. Zona is mocked and put down because the others don't see her as a contestant. After a very long and pee-filled group hug, Zona mysteriously starts pulling into the lead. Owen calls her out for cheating and she makes her statement arguing why she deserves the warm shower every day. Owen makes his counter arguments and wins the shower in the end.
12	4	"Learn, Fun, Can!"	Jeremy Warner	Whitney Call & Stephen Meek	November 25, 2021
The group goes to a daycare to shoot a commercial about it, But the main teacher abandons the group with her classmates.
13	5	"Doodles Chips"	Jeremy Warner	Mallory Everton	December 2, 2021
the group gets hired for twenty thousand dollars to film an ad for a chip company. however, the chips are drugged, and all the group members except owen, on account of his microstomach condition, join the cult the chip company is a cover for. owen confronts the cult and is revealed to be the chosen one pictured on the sacred doodle. he accidentally destroys the cult, though he did milk the cult first.
14	6	"Barber Tom"	Phillip Goodwin	Adam Berg	December 9, 2021
the group is hired to film an ad for a barber shop. barber tom is sick, and the whole group except zona catches diseases, causing them to look after each other as zona edits the ad, which is the only reason barber tom is still alive. after she's done, she sends it to barber tom, who dies upon watching.
15	7	"Legend Quest"	Jeremy Warner & David Vance	David Vance	December 16, 2021
16	8	"A Freelancers Carol"	Thomas Russell	Matt Meese	December 23, 2021
On Christmas morning, Devin gifts Owen the camera she stole from him last year. She also gives Ryan an empty box, Micah two prank boxes, and Zona a watch. however, after filming an ad for foot doctor the musical, they are ready to quit. Mr. Gandalfini gifts the group a clock filled with demons and horrible songs and poetry. they fill a trash can with gasoline and their equipment when jenny, who left the group to get rich, comes as a ghost to warn the group to keep working their jobs by sending three spirits. the first spirit, Joan, explains she's in a coma and shows the group their start in the 80's, which surprises her. the second spirit is William, who is physically there and proves it by slapping Owen twice. he shows the group three recent jobs, which they did in the episodes "doodles Chips","legend quest", and "Learn, fun, can!" the final spirit is petunia, the creepy doll from "cursed", who shows the group that they will be grave diggers if they quit their jobs. the group repents of this, and they are returned "only" 36 hours after they first left. they call Mr. Gandolfini to accept a dinner invitation.

== Production ==
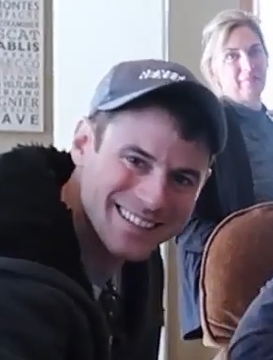
Actor Matt Meese has written several episodes and also stars as Ryan.

Created by Mallory Everton, Freelancers was one of the first projects started by JK! Studios, following their departure from the BYUtv sketch comedy series Studio C and appearance on NBC's Bring the Funny. The first season of the series was written in six weeks, by four writers who had never worked on "sitcom material" before. In a statement, actress and writer Whitney Call said, "It was pretty scary to leave the security of BYUtv and pursue our dream of creating unlimited, family accessible comedy together. To see what our content means to the amazing people out there shows us that this is bigger than us. We want people to join us and feel at home while watching our shows."

The show is filmed entirely in the state of Utah. For the series' main location, the crew rented an old home in Provo, with additional filming taking place on-location. The first season of Freelancers was produced and budgeted using Patreon, allowing fans of the show to donate to JK! Studios. Various cast members of the series also wrote episodes for the show, including Adam Berg, Mallory Everton, and Matt Meese.

In December 2020, an investment campaign was launched by JK! Studios to produce a second season for Angel Studios. The company reached their $1 million goal in January 2021, promising to make eight episodes in return. In April, the Utah Film Commission announced that the second season had been given permission to film in Utah County along with two other projects, estimating that the productions would generate approximately $1.9 million in economic impact. Filming for the second season concluded in May 2021.

== Release ==
The show's first season premiered on March 28, 2019, and concluded after eight episodes on May 23. A Christmas special was later released on December 19, 2019. As of November 2021, the first season has garnered an estimated 7 million viewers on YouTube. A second season premiered on November 4, 2021.
