= The Hunger Games Musical =

2014 parody music videos

- Characters Peeta Mellark, Katniss Everdeen, and Gale Hawthorne in "Katniss' Song" (2014)
- No. of episodes: 3

Original release
- Release: October 30, 2014

The Hunger Games Musical is a series of three music videos parodying The Hunger Games. Created by sketch comedy series Studio C, the videos feature original songs and focus on the love triangle between Hunger Games main characters Katniss Everdeen, Peeta Mellark, and Gale Hawthorne. The music videos were released on October 30, 2014, ahead of the November 21, 2014 release of The Hunger Games: Mockingjay – Part 1. The videos collectively surpassed a million views by late November. One of the three videos, "Peeta's Song", was selected as an entrant in the category of fan-made music video for Samsung's 2015 competition for Hunger Games fan art. "Peeta's Song" received over 50,000 votes and won in the category.

== Production ==
Ahead of the November 21, 2014 release of The Hunger Games: Mockingjay – Part 1, BYUtv sketch comedy series Studio C created three music videos parodying The Hunger Games. The videos feature original songs, themed on The Hunger Games, created by Studio C. Jared Shores was executive producer of Studio C at the time.

On October 30, 2014, BYUtv released the music videos. BYUtv also made the songs available for download. The videos are titled "The Hunger Games Musical: Mockingjay Parody – Katniss' Song", "The Hunger Games Musical: Mockingjay Parody – Gale's Song", and "The Hunger Games Musical: Mockingjay Parody - Peeta's Song".

== Summary ==
Collectively, the videos focus on the love triangle of Hunger Games characters Everdeen, Mellark, and Hawthorne. "Katniss' Song" depicts Everdeen trying to decide on a romantic partner between the characters Mellark and Hawthorne. In "Gale's Song", Hawthorne makes his case for being Everdeen's partner. "Peeta's Song" shows Mellark and Hawthorne at odds over Everdeen.

== Reception ==
Within a week of the release, "Peeta's Song" was viewed over 300,000 times on YouTube; collectively, the three videos surpassed a million views by November 20. America praised the videos as "tightly composed".

In 2015, Samsung sponsored a competition for Hunger Games fan art, with winners determined from votes submitted by the public. "Peeta's Song" was included as an entrant in the category for fan-made music videos; executive producer Jared Shores said the Studio C cast and crew did not know about this ahead of time and that learning about their entry in the contest surprised them. The category for fan-made music videos received more votes than any other category, and with over 50,000 votes, "Peeta's Song" won the category.
