= Goodbye, Petrushka =

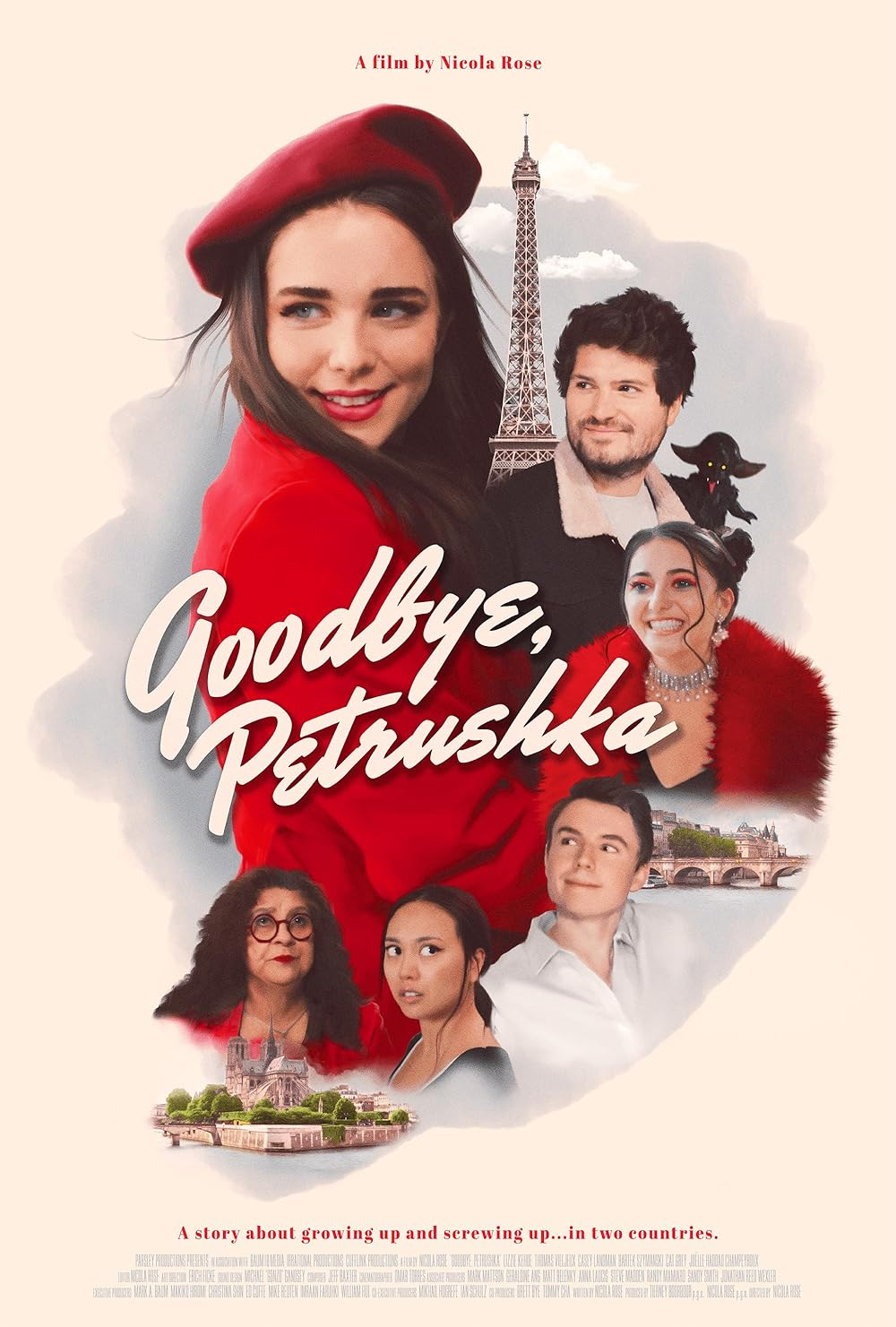
- Theatrical release poster
- Directed by: Nicola Rose
- Written by: Nicola Rose
- Produced by: Tierney Boorboor; Nicola Rose
- Starring: Lizzie Kehoe; Thomas Vieljeux; Casey Landman
- Cinematography: Omar Torres
- Edited by: Jacob Benton; Nicola Rose
- Music by: Jeff Baxter
- Production companies: Parsley Productions; Cufflink Productions; Baum18Media; Irrational Productions
- Distributed by: Indie Rights Movies
- Release dates: June 12, 2022 (Dances With Films Festival); July 21, 2022 (US)
- Running time: 100 minutes
- Country: United States
- Languages: English; French

Goodbye, Petrushka is a 2022 American romantic comedy film directed by Nicola Rose, starring Lizzie Kehoe, Thomas Vieljeux and Casey Landman. Written by Rose and produced by Rose and Tierney Boorboor, it explores the themes of art, love, and growing up through the characters of Claire, a young American puppeteer at the start of her career; and Thibaut, a French figure skater at the end of his. They meet in New York, then again in Paris, and affect each other's lives in unexpected ways.

Goodbye, Petrushka was Rose's first feature film. It premiered at the Dances With Films festival in Los Angeles in June 2022, and went on to win Best Feature at the Milledgeville-Eatonton Film Festival, Broad Humor Film Festival and others.

== Plot ==
Claire, an American college student and aspiring puppeteer, dreams of going to live in France — not least because she has a crush on Thibaut, a French figure skater. Accompanied by her rich, unhinged best friend Julia, Claire goes to France, where she faces multiple troubles, including an odious job as a jeune fille au pair and a toxic relationship.

Claire also meets Thibaut in person, only to discover he is at the end of his career, facing his own struggles and depression. The two devise to create an on-ice version of Igor Stravinsky's ballet Petrushka, combining skating and puppetry. Soon, though, the project is beset by its own problems, leaving Claire and Thibaut to figure out their roles in each other's lives.

== Cast ==
- Lizzie Kehoe as Claire
- Thomas Vieljeux as Thibaut
- Casey Landman as Julia
- Bartek Szymanski as Rafał
- Cat Grey as Trina
- Joëlle Haddad-Champeyroux as The Bureaucrat
- Dhane Ross as Professor Steve
- Matej Silecky as Ice Skater

== Release ==
The film premiered at the Dances With Films Film Festival on June 12, 2022.

== Reception ==
Stephanie Archer of Film Inquiry wrote that the film "navigates the turbulent experience of challenging reality with ambition, pushing past the naysayers to deliver something one can be proud of."

Alan Ng of Film Threat gave the film a score of 7 out of 10 and called it a "heartfelt narrative", writing that it is "not a perfect film, but it’s a very personal one."

Elias Savada of Film International wrote that "Rose’s world offers few other passersby in any of its worldly settings, so you’re pushed to accept Goodbye, Petrushka in its own microcosm."

Julie Musbach of FF2 Media called Goodbye, Petrushka "an enjoyable and touching watch," writing, "There is no villain. There is no grand heartbreak. It’s a soft spoken, uniquely told tale of a girl trying to find her way."

Director Nicola Rose noted in a later interview about her second feature film, Magnetosphere, that some viewers have interpreted Goodbye, Petrushka's main character Claire as neurodivergent and autistic.
