= Magnetosphere (film) =

Canadian film recently released

- Release poster
- Directed by: Nicola Rose
- Written by: Nicola Rose
- Produced by: Tierney Boorboor; Rebeka Herron; Drew Martin
- Starring: Shayelin Martin; Steven He; Colin Mochrie; Patrick McKenna; Tara Strong; Debra McGrath; Mikayla Kong; Tania Webb; Zooey Schneider; Jordyn Gillis
- Cinematography: Mathieu Taillefer
- Edited by: Nicola Rose
- Music by: Matthew Reid
- Production companies: Rusty Halo Productions; Pine Pathways Productions; Baum18Media
- Distributed by: Freestyle Digital Media
- Release dates: October 2024 (Hamilton Film Festival); July 22, 2025 (VOD Release in North America)
- Running time: 89 minutes
- Country: Canada
- Language: English

Magnetosphere is a 2024 Canadian coming-of-age comedy film written and directed by Nicola Rose, starring Shayelin Martin, Steven He, Colin Mochrie and Patrick McKenna. It explores the themes of neurodiversity, first love, and growing up through the character of Maggie, a young neurodivergent teenager realizing she has synesthesia. After moving across the country with her family, she experiences her first love, meets her first best friend, and comes to terms with her neurodivergence.

Magnetosphere was Rose's second feature film, following Goodbye, Petrushka. After screening at the Dances With Films and ReelAbilities film festivals among others, the film was released on multiple streaming platforms via Freestyle Digital Media in July 2025.

== Plot ==
In 1997 Ontario, thirteen‑year‑old Maggie Campion navigates a new town and a new school. Timid and self‑conscious, she experiences synesthesia — a neurodivergence that allows her to see sounds and hear colors. Initially, she tries to hide it, and she has trouble escaping her negative internal monologue, frequently spoken aloud to her by vindictive doll Captain Cassiopeia. However, as she becomes involved in her father’s quirky community theatre production of The Pirates of Penzance, meets her first best friend, and falls in unrequited love with astronomy student Travis (who nicknames her "Magnetosphere"), Maggie begins to accept her synesthesia as something to celebrate rather than conceal. A supporting cast of eccentric adults, including loony exterminator Gil and perceptive art teacher Ms. Deering, encourages Maggie’s emerging self‑confidence.

== Cast ==
- Shayelin Martin as Maggie Campion
- Steven He as Travis
- Colin Mochrie as Gil
- Patrick McKenna as Russell Campion
- Tara Strong as Captain Cassiopeia
- Debra McGrath as Ms. Deering
- Mikayla Kong as Wendy
- Tania Webb as Helen Campion
- Zooey Schneider as Evie Campion
- Jordyn Gillis as Jessica
- William C. Cole as Dr. Cluny
- Bruce Stanfield as Great-Uncle Peter

== Release ==
The film was released via Freestyle Digital Media in July 2025.

== Reception ==
Nick Bythrow of Screen Rant wrote that the film "does a great job crafting a tale that's both magnificent and remarkable."

Stephanie Malone of Morbidly Beautiful described the film as "a movie about the fight to love your mind, especially when it makes you feel like a stranger in the world. It’s about theater and fairy dust and the contradictory brutality of growing up. And it’s a reminder—especially for creatives, weirdos, and genre lovers—that the way we see the world might not be normal. But it might just be magical."

Richard Propes of The Independent Critic gave the film 3.5 out of 4 stars, stating: "While a film's cast always matters, the simple truth is that without the perfect ensemble Magnetosphere would never have worked. Magnetosphere works gloriously."

Vimala Mangat of Gazettely gave the film a score of 4 out of 5, writing that "its gentle power comes from its sincere belief in its core idea, perfectly captured when a doctor reassures Maggie about her condition by stating simply, “You’re already okay.”"
