= Matej Silecky =

American figure skater and documentary film director

Personal information
- Born: 15 April 1994 (age 32) Verona, New Jersey, United States
- Home town: Berkeley, CA
- Height: 1.85 m (6.1 ft)

Figure skating career
- Country: United States
- Skating club: The Skating Club of New York
- Began skating: 1998

Matej Silecky (born April 15, 1994) is an American figure skater and documentary film director.

== Early life and education ==
Matej was born on April 15, 1994, and was raised in Verona, New Jersey and Kyiv, Ukraine.

He is a 2015 graduate of the University of California, Berkeley where he received the Charlene Conrad Liebau Library Prize for Undergraduate Research for The Post-Soviet Development of Elite-Level Athletics in Kazakhstan, Kyrgyzstan, Tajikistan, Turkmenistan and Uzbekistan.

== Figure Skating Career ==
Matej competed in singles and pairs and was the 2012 U.S. Collegiate Figure Skating Championships Junior Men's Champion. He left competitive skating due to a shoulder injury sustained during the 2015 – 2016 season. At that time, he was partnered with Elizaveta Usmantseva, competing in Senior Pairs at the 2016 U.S. Figure Skating Championships. After a six-year hiatus from competitive skating, Matej and his partner, Kate Finster, competed at the 2022 U.S. Figure Skating Championships in Championship Pairs, where they placed 7th.

=== Competitive Programs ===
| Season | Short program | Free skating |
|---|---|---|
| Pairs 2021–2022 | Carry You (featuring Fleurie) by Ruelle (singer); choreo. by Sinead Kerr, John Kerr[6] | Lighthouse by Patrick Watson (musician); choreo. by Sinead Kerr, John Kerr |
| Pairs 2015–2016 | Selections from Ghost (soundtrack); choreo. by Matej Silecky | Selections from Pirates of the Caribbean: At World's End; choreo. by Matej Silecky |
| Singles 2012–2013 | Vuelvo al Sur (Koop Remix) by Astor Piazzola & Fernando Solanas | Exogenesis: Symphony, Pt. 3 Redemption by Muse; choreo. by Phillip Mills |

=== Professional Skating ===
In 2017 - 2018, Matej joined ITV's Dancing On Ice (series 10) in the United Kingdom. He was partnered with Coronation Street actress Brooke Vincent, and they finished as Runners-up in the series. In 2019 – 2020, Matej was a skating professional in Dancing on Ice (Netherlands and Belgium), where he and his partner, Olympic gold medalist in snowboarding, Nicolien Sauerbreij, made the semifinals. He also skated in the first ice skating event in Nepal, Skate Nepal, led by Dawa Steven Sherpa, as part of the Visit Nepal 2020 campaign, at Gokyo Lakes (4750 m) on February 14, 2020, along with Elizabeth Putnam, Patrick Chan, Jeremy Abbott, Sergei Voronov and others.

== Film career ==
Whilst recovering from an injury, Matej established a production company, Kitsune Tale Productions, and made the documentary, Baba Babee Skazala [Grandmother Told Grandmother] about Ukrainian children torn from their homes in the crush between the Nazi and Soviet fronts in World War II.

In 2022, Matej played the role of Ice Skater in the independent feature film Goodbye, Petrushka.
