= Matt Meese =

American actor and comedian

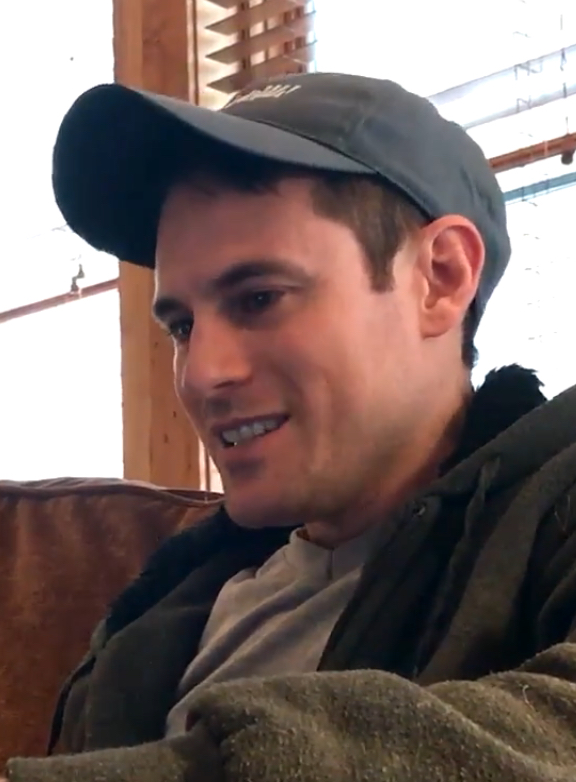
- Meese in 2017
- Born: Matthew Ryan Meese; New Jersey, U.S.
- Education: Brigham Young University
- Occupations: Actor; screenwriter; sketch comedian

Matthew Ryan Meese is a sketch comedian and actor who is best known for his role as an actor, head writer, and co-creator of Studio C, a sketch comedy show produced by BYUtv.

== Early life and education ==
Matthew Ryan Meese was born in New Jersey, but raised in Phoenix, Arizona as the second of four children. After high school, Meese served as a missionary for the Church of Jesus Christ of Latter-day Saints in Chicago, Illinois, after which he attended and later graduated from BYU with an undergraduate degree in Psychology. Before and after his college graduation, he worked for the Monte L. Bean Life Science Museum for a total of five years.

== Studio C ==
It was during his membership of BYU's on-campus sketch comedy group, Divine Comedy that Meese and other original members of Studio C first conceived the idea for the show. The show was not considered by BYUtv until Meese personally met with content director Jared Shores, his best friend, and pitched him the idea. Meese is acknowledged as one of the creators of Studio C and the show's head writer. Matt is known for many roles in his sketch comedy.

Meese's most well-known role is as Scott Sterling, an unlucky soccer and volleyball player who continually receives blows to the head and by doing so ultimately helps his team to victory. In terms of views, the Sterling series are the most successful sketches of Studio C, being the only Studio C videos to exceed 75 million views on YouTube.

As confirmed in August 2018, while Studio C had a 10th season, he and the other nine original cast members left after the 9th season to create and star in a new production company called JK! Studios. After sharing the news, he also expressed that he would like to do future guest spots for the show when the opportunity arises. On April 27, 2024, Studio C announced that Meese would be returning for seasons 19 and 20 of the series.

== JK! Studios ==
Meese stars in the JK! Studios series “Freelancers” playing Ryan. Meese, along with fellow JK! Studios cast members Mallory Everton, Stacey Harkey, Jason Gray, Natalie Madsen, and Jeremy Warner, participated in the first season of the televised comedy competition, Bring the Funny, making it all the way to the semi-finals.

== Personal life ==
Meese is colorblind.

== Filmography ==
Year	Title	Role	Notes
2008	Unhinged	Right	Short
2012	Abandoned in Space	Calvin	Short
2012–2019	Studio C	Himself/Scott Sterling/Captain Literally/Various others	Main Cast (Season 1-9); Serves also as head writer and co-creator
2014	Saints and Soldiers: The Void	Daniel Barlow	Movie
2016	Jester'Z Improv Comedy Live	Himself/Various	DVD Special
2017	Conan	Himself- Studio C	1 episode
2017	Frankly Faraci	Himself	1 episode
2018	The Laughter Life	Himself	Documentary about Studio C
2019	Bring the Funny	Himself- JK! Studios	3 episodes Writer- 1 episode
2019-	Freelancers	Ryan	Main Cast, Web-series; Serves also as a staff writer
2023	Go West	Captain Evander Lillianquist, Willy, Flour Man, Jeff	Movie
