= Steven He =

Chinese-Irish comedian (born 1996)

- Born: 31 December 1996 (age 29); Shenzhen, China
- Citizenship: Ireland
- Education: Regent's University London; Neighborhood Playhouse School of the Theater
- Occupations: Social media personality; actor; comedian; pianist

YouTube information
- Channel: Steven He
- Years active: 2019–present
- Genre: Sketch comedy
- Subscribers: 14.2 million
- Views: 5.02 billion
- Last updated: 3 September 2026

Steven He (born 31 December 1996) is a Chinese born Irish social media personality, actor, and comedian, currently based in the United States. Primarily known for his satirical comedy sketches on YouTube and TikTok, he rose to prominence in the 2020s through his portrayal of a fictionalized version of his father, whose personality parodies parenting stereotypes of East Asians. He also popularized the phrase "emotional damage".

== Biography ==
Steven He was born on 31 December 1996, in Shenzhen, China, where he lived until the age of 8. He moved to Ireland in 2004 and continued to travel between both China and Ireland. He moved to West Covina, California, intending to become an actor and YouTuber.

He started his YouTube channel in 2019. Before this, he performed short comedy skits on TikTok. Since then, he became known for the Internet meme "emotional damage", a catchphrase that went viral after the release of his YouTube video, "When 'Asian' is a difficulty mode", and starring in the dramedy series, Groundbreaking. In 2023 he started the Ginormo! series on YouTube.

He owns and uploads videos to three YouTube channels: his eponymous channel Steven He, Steven He Live, and Steven He Shorts.

In September 2024, he was announced to making an appearance as a "special guest" in the second episode of the 19th season of the BYU TV sketch-comedy series, Studio C.

In 2023, Steven He filmed the role of Travis, an astronomy student and the love interest of the main character, in the independent film Magnetosphere alongside Colin Mochrie and Tara Strong. The film released in summer 2025.

In early October 2026, he married Greta Schaub, as referenced in her mother's YouTube video.

== Awards ==
Year	Award	Date	Category	Result	Ref.
2023	Show Awards	27 August 2023	Scripted Series	Won	

== See also ==
- List of YouTubers
