= Studio C =

American comedy sketch series

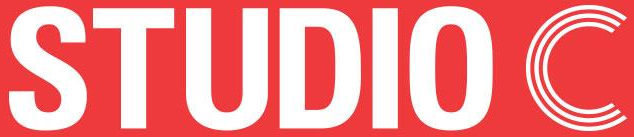
- Genre: Sketch comedy
- Created by: Matt Meese; Jared Shores
- Theme music composer: Kori Gardner; Jason Hammel
- Opening theme: "I Want to Run" by Mates of State (since season 2)
- Country of origin: United States
- Original language: English
- No. of seasons: 23
- No. of episodes: 1,500 videos on YouTube; 243 full episodes on the BYUtv channel. (list of episodes)

Production
- Executive producers: Derek Marquis; Scott Swofford; Michael Dunn; Andra Johnson Duke; Jake Van Wagoner; Micah W. Merrill; Jeff Simpson
- Producers: Matt Meese; Luiz Malaman; Erik Christensen; Brian Gibson; Luke Johnson
- Production locations: Provo, Utah
- Camera setup: Multi-camera
- Running time: 1–26 minutes
- Production companies: BYU Broadcasting, BYUtv (season 1–present); Kaleidoscope Pictures (season 10–present); Poor Soul Productions (seasons 10–11)

Original release
- Network: BYU TV www.BYUtv.org
- Release: October 8, 2012 – present

Studio C is an American sketch comedy television show originally created by Matt Meese and Jared Shores. Produced by BYUtv, the show aims to be a clean, family-oriented comedy for a national audience.

The show traces its roots to the Brigham Young University sketch comedy troupe Divine Comedy, which shares some cast members with Studio C. The show's name is a reference to the studio in the BYU Broadcasting Building where the show is primarily taped.

As of September 2026, the Studio C YouTube channel has over 3.47 million subscribers and has received more than 3.3 billion total views.

In August 2018, it was confirmed that Studio C would have a 10th season but the ten original cast members would be leaving after the 9th season to create and star together on a new family-comedy network called JK! Studios. In addition to Johnson and Pence's return, the 10th season and onward feature all-new cast members.

In October 2020, it was announced that Jason Gray would return to Studio C as a permanent cast member in the fourteenth season during Fall 2021. Gray was not a cast member during Seasons 19 and 20 of the show.

On April 27, 2024, Studio C announced that Matt Meese would be returning for seasons 19 and 20 of the series, airing Fall 2024 and Spring 2025. As of season 21, he is still a main cast member.

On September 25, 2024, BYUtv announced special guests for season 19 (Steven He and Terry Crews), and season 20 (Jack McBrayer and Will Forte) of Studio C. BYUtv also announced that the Studio C YouTube channel has reached 3 billion views. Season 21 special guests include Josh Peck and Pierson. Season 22 featured special guest Rainn Wilson.

== Cast ==
Cast
Cast member	Seasons										
Cast member	1–4	5–7	8–9	10–13	14	15	16	17	18	19–22	23
Jason Gray	Main	Main	Main	Featured	Main	Main	Main	Main	Main	Featured	Main
Mallory Everton	Main	Main	Main	—N/a	—N/a	—N/a	—N/a	—N/a	Featured	Featured	—N/a
Whitney Call	Main	Main	Main	—N/a	—N/a	—N/a	—N/a	—N/a	Featured	—N/a	—N/a
Matt Meese	Main	Main	Main	—N/a	—N/a	—N/a	—N/a	—N/a	Featured	Main	—N/a
Adam Berg	Featured	Main	Main	—N/a	—N/a	—N/a	—N/a	—N/a	Featured	—N/a	—N/a
Stacey Harkey	Featured	Main	Main	—N/a	—N/a	—N/a	—N/a	—N/a	Featured	—N/a	—N/a
Natalie Madsen	Featured	Main	Main	—N/a	—N/a	—N/a	—N/a	—N/a	Featured	—N/a	—N/a
Stephen Meek	Featured	Main	Main	—N/a	—N/a	—N/a	—N/a	—N/a	Featured	—N/a	—N/a
James Perry	Featured	Main	Main	—N/a	—N/a	—N/a	—N/a	—N/a	Featured	—N/a	—N/a
Jeremy Warner	Featured	Main	Main	—N/a	—N/a	—N/a	—N/a	—N/a	Featured	—N/a	—N/a
Aaron Fielding	—N/a	—N/a	Featured	—N/a	—N/a	—N/a	—N/a	—N/a	—N/a	—N/a	—N/a
Dalton Johnson	—N/a	Featured	Featured	Main	Main	Main	Main	Main	Main	Main	Main
Tori Pence	—N/a	Featured	Featured	Main	Featured	—N/a	Main	Main	Main	Main	—N/a
Garet Allen	—N/a	—N/a	—N/a	Main	Main	Main	Main	Main	Main	Main	Main
Jessica Drolet	—N/a	—N/a	—N/a	Main	Main	Main	—N/a	—N/a	—N/a	—N/a	—N/a
Ike Flitcraft	—N/a	—N/a	—N/a	Main	Featured	Featured	Featured	—N/a	Featured	—N/a	—N/a
Matthew Galvan	—N/a	—N/a	—N/a	Main	—N/a	—N/a	—N/a	—N/a	—N/a	—N/a	—N/a
Tanner Gillman	—N/a	—N/a	—N/a	Main	Main	Main	Featured	—N/a	—N/a	—N/a	—N/a
Jetta Juriansz	—N/a	—N/a	—N/a	Main	Main	Main	—N/a	—N/a	—N/a	—N/a	—N/a
Arvin Mitchell	—N/a	—N/a	—N/a	Main	Main	Main	Main	—N/a	—N/a	—N/a	—N/a
April Rock	—N/a	—N/a	—N/a	Main	Main	—N/a	—N/a	—N/a	—N/a	—N/a	—N/a
Austin Williams	—N/a	—N/a	—N/a	Main	Main	Main	—N/a	Featured	Featured	—N/a	—N/a
Naomi Winders	—N/a	—N/a	—N/a	—N/a	Featured	Featured	Main	—N/a	Featured	Main	Main
Megan Rico	—N/a	—N/a	—N/a	—N/a	Featured	Featured	Main	Featured	Featured	—N/a	—N/a
Joe Balanza	—N/a	—N/a	—N/a	—N/a	—N/a	Featured	Featured	—N/a	—N/a	—N/a	—N/a
Gabby Moore	—N/a	—N/a	—N/a	—N/a	—N/a	—N/a	Featured	Main	Main	—N/a	—N/a
Jericho Lopez	—N/a	—N/a	—N/a	—N/a	—N/a	—N/a	Featured	Main	Main	Main	Main
Kiri Case	—N/a	—N/a	—N/a	—N/a	—N/a	—N/a	—N/a	Main	Main	Main	Main
Carl Foreman	—N/a	—N/a	—N/a	—N/a	—N/a	—N/a	—N/a	Main	Main	Main	—N/a
Aleta Myles	—N/a	—N/a	—N/a	—N/a	—N/a	—N/a	—N/a	Main	Main	Main	Main
Michelle Knapp	—N/a	—N/a	—N/a	—N/a	—N/a	—N/a	—N/a	—N/a	—N/a	Main	Main
Hugh Clark	—N/a	—N/a	—N/a	—N/a	—N/a	—N/a	—N/a	—N/a	—N/a	Main	—N/a
Chad Westbrook	—N/a	—N/a	—N/a	—N/a	—N/a	—N/a	—N/a	—N/a	—N/a	—N/a	Main
Claire Riffle	—N/a	—N/a	—N/a	—N/a	—N/a	—N/a	—N/a	—N/a	—N/a	—N/a	Main

- N/A = Actor does not appear in those series.
- The 10 original cast members of Studio C left after Season 10 to start their own comedy group, JK! Studios which continues to produce sketches in front of a live audience, as well as a sitcom, a lifestyle vlog, and several other new elements. Their YouTube channel has over 413,000 subscribers as of October 2026.
- Tori Pence and Dalton Johnson first appeared as featured guests in Season 6, but did not appear in Seasons 5 or 7. For the sake of simplicity, however, the graph shows them as appearing in the 5–7 block.
- Tori Pence, who was first introduced in Season 6 and later became a cast member in Seasons 8 and 9, left Studio C after Season 13 to become a full-time cast member of BYUtv's new sitcom 9 Years to Neptune. However, she still made guest appearances as a featured cast member in several episodes of Season 14. Tori then returned as a full-time cast member in season 16 through the current season. Similarly, Ike Flitcraft left to do some freelance work, but appeared as a featured cast member in the Studio C Season 14 Halloween Special. Tori Pence later returned in Season 16.
- The original cast (sometimes referred to as the "Old Cast") reprised their roles during Season 18 Episode 1 for Studio C's hour-long 200th episode special.

== Series overview ==
Season	Episodes	Originally released	
Season	Episodes	First released	Last released
S	13	October 5, 2013	February 27, 2023
1	10	October 8, 2012	December 10, 2012
2	12	April 1, 2013	June 17, 2013
3	10	October 8, 2013	December 10, 2013
4	10	April 7, 2014	June 16, 2014
5	10	October 6, 2014	December 8, 2014
6	20	September 7, 2015	April 18, 2016
7	19	October 1, 2016	April 3, 2017
8	15	October 2, 2017	April 2, 2018
9	16	September 10, 2018	March 25, 2019
10	11	September 30, 2019	December 9, 2019
11	10	April 6, 2020	June 15, 2020
12	10	October 5, 2020	December 7, 2020
13	10	February 8, 2021	April 12, 2021
14	10	September 27, 2021	November 29, 2021
15	10	March 14, 2022	May 16, 2022
16	7	October 3, 2022	February 27, 2023
17	8	October 16, 2023	December 4, 2023
18	8	March 3, 2024	April 21, 2024
19	7	October 14, 2024	November 25, 2024
20	7	March 3, 2025	April 14, 2025
21	7	October 13, 2025	November 24, 2025
22	7	April 9, 2026	May 21, 2026
23	7	October 19, 2026	November 30, 2026

== Recurring characters and sketches ==
=== Seasons 1–9 ===
The following characters and themes have appeared in at least two sketches:

==== A Message From Studio C ====
A series of mock PSAs shot off-set in single-camera setup. The PSAs typically feature something ironic and/or unexpected. Text concerning the fake announcement is overlaid at the end of the video and then it cuts to the Studio C logo and the words, "This Has Been A Message From Studio C". Debuted Season 2, Episode 2. There have been seven segments of A Message From Studio C.

==== Ann Withers ====
Ann is a single, middle-aged librarian, played by Whitney Call, who characteristically inserts book titles into her conversation, lifting up the book as she says its title. Ann pronounces her name as "Enn", leading to confusion over what her name is when she introduces herself to others. Ann has a preference for much younger men, but tends to scare away all the men she attempts to seduce. Debuted Season 2, Episode 3. Ann has appeared in four sketches and is in one segment of Awkward Avoidance Viking.

==== Awkward Avoidance Viking ====
A silent character played by Jason Gray, dressed as a Viking warrior. He appears whenever Matt Meese has an awkward encounter with another person. The Awkward Avoidance Viking will rise up behind the back of the character Meese would like to avoid, and upon a nod of approval from Meese, knocks the character unconscious with his club. There are other Awkward Avoidance Vikings as well, including a female version, and ones that knock out the Viking when he is the awkward situation. Awkward Avoidance Viking segments are shot off-set with a single-camera setup and include an animated intro as well as a musical theme. Debuted Season 1, Episode 7. The Awkward Avoidance Viking has appeared in six segments.

==== Aww Yeah Girl ====
Played by Mallory Everton, is a character that follows couples while shouting, "Aww yeah!" as they're about to kiss. She first appears in season 6. There have been two Aww Yeah Girl sketches.

==== Bad Karma ====
A sketch where Mallory Everton is a girl who has a bad habit of laughing at/making fun of others in trouble, and then realizing that laughing at/making fun of them was the wrong thing to do. Then she proceeds to have a silly and bad experience. Later in the sketch, she is injured badly but still has bad things happen even when she tries to do good. After each bad thing that happens to her, a short jingle plays with audio of a person singing, "Bad Karma!". There have been two Bad Karma sketches.

==== Batman ====
Jason Gray appears as Batman in a variety of sketches.

===== Batman Drives Uber =====
A spinoff of the Batman sketches. Batman (Jason Gray) starts driving for Uber to get more money after spending all of it when he bought the Moon, renaming it 'Batmoon.' He has conversations with the people he is giving rides to. There have been three Batman Drives Uber sketches.

==== Callin' Collin ====
Mallory Everton plays Collin, an obnoxious 11-year-old boy who has a popular podcast. He gives advice to people who call in that is not helpful in any way, such as "punch him in the booty" (in response to a question about annoying people) and "business documents" (in response to a question from his friend's mother about birthday party themes). He considers himself a womanizer and often tries to sound manly and smart. There have been three Callin' Collin sketches.

==== Captain Literally ====
A superhero (Matt Meese) who arrives whenever someone uses the word "literally" to emphasize something that is not strictly true. Captain Literally uses his superpowers to make what was said become reality. His catchphrase is "Balance Restored!" which he says following the use of his powers. His uniform is a full-body red spandex suit, with blue briefs and wristbands over the suit, a blue cape, blue domino mask, and a capital blue letter "L" emblazoned on the chest. The segment is shot off-set with a single-camera setup, has a musical theme, and includes an animated intro and outro that shows his adventures as part of a comic book. Debuted Season 2, Episode 4. There have been seven Captain Literally segments, including two sketches with other minor characters including Captain Irony played by Mallory Everton. A spinoff of the popular ship "Mattory", "Captain Lironally" has been mentioned by fans. Other minor characters include The Nuclear Ninja played by Adam Berg, The Good and Well duo played by Stephen Meek and Stacey Harkey, and Dangling Participle Dude played by James Perry.

==== Couchville ====
The "Couchville" series is about a kingdom ruled by King Warrick (Jason Grey) and Queen Iona (Whitney Call Meek) inside a couch owned by Thomas (Matt Meese). In later segments, there have been various characters depicting different household furniture including an ottoman ruler (Stephen Meek), a lovesack (Jeremy Warner), a rug (Adam Berg), french doors (James Perry), a doormat (Mallory Everton), and two chandeliers played by Natalie Madsen and Jared Shores, co-creator of Studio C. There have been three "Couchville" segments.

==== Crazy Mall Kiosk Salesman ====
Played by Jason Gray, Leo is a mall kiosk salesman who sells lotion in front of the A&M clothing store. He often tries to make the other cast members buy his lotion using a variety of methods, such as free-sampling Stacey in the face, showing that he has lotion for ridiculous purposes, and announcing that for 1 minute all Nintendo Switch's are free to thin out the herd. His reveals that his cousins work at the Verizon kiosk after he hacks into Jeremy's phone. He has sociopath behavior when he seemingly kills Matt and eats a live mouse. There have been 2 Crazy Mall Kiosk Salesman segments.

==== Darth Sidious ====
Jason Gray impersonates Darth Sidious from Star Wars. He often urges other characters to strike him down, "And your journey to the dark side will be complete." There have been three Darth Sidious segments.

David Starr

Jeremy Warner plays a character called David Wayne Starr who is interviewed by a news reporter Roger Kennings played by Steven Meek. David Starr introduces himself by saying, “My name’s David Wayne Starr with a double R.” He constantly mentions how he is a disappointment to his parents and how much of a Star Wars fan he is. He also explains that his voice has not matured like his body until the sketch, “Middle School Kid Ruins the News One Last Time.” There have been three David Starr skits.

==== Dobby ====
Jason Gray impersonates Dobby the house-elf from the Harry Potter series. Comic situations arise when characters are faced with being required to do something bad to Dobby (his manager at Walmart firing him as door greeter, Jason Bourne executing him, etc.) and yet Dobby still loves them unconditionally and his characterological self-blame causes him to believe he deserves his punishment. Dobby aggressively uses his magical powers to protect the character after they can't go through with it. Debuted Season 1, Episode 9. Dobby has appeared in three sketches.

==== Farley Archer ====
Farley Archer played by Jeremy Warner, along with his assistant Terry played by Stephen Meek, host a show called "The Dog Whisperer with Farley Archer" on the South Dakota Public Access Television. There have been three Farley Archer sketches.

==== Gary and Carl ====
Featuring Stacey Harkey as Gary Johnson and Jeremy Warner as Carl Johnson, the Gary and Carl Show is a useless advice show seemingly set in the 80s. Recurring themes are unanswered questions, stupidity, and Dasani water advertising. There have been three Gary and Carl segments.

==== The Guild of Adventurers ====
The Guild of Adventurers are three geeky guys, played by Jason Gray, Matt Meese, and Adam Berg, who enjoy role-playing games. Jeremy Warner and Stacey Harkey have also appeared in this recurring segment. The sketches are often centered around their interactions with romantic interests.

==== How To Pick Up Chicks (With Marcus) ====
Starring Jason Gray as Marcus, this series pokes fun at inexperienced YouTubers and guys trying to hit on girls. Humor results in inaccurate information, misspelled words, and obnoxious flirting. There have been three "How To Pick Up Chicks" segments.

==== The Hunger Games Musical ====
This series features characters from The Hunger Games film franchise. "The Hunger Games Musical" consists of three music videos each sung from the perspective of a different character. The songs are sung by Mallory Everton as Katniss Everdeen, Jason Gray as Gale Hawthorne and Stacey Harkey as Cinna who sings Peeta Mellark's song because Peeta has been captured at the point in time of the story. Each song is the characters view on the love triangle going on between them. There have been three Hunger Games Musical sketches and one behind the scenes video.

==== Hyperactive Kyle ====
Played by Matt Meese, he is a hyperactive child. Often gets repeating items, such as an Xbox or iPhone, and will say "Cool, now I have two..." He annoys his parents and the other characters. He debuted in Season 3, Episode 6. There have been five segments of Hyperactive Kyle.

==== The Janitor ====
Played by James Perry, this old, potbellied janitor appears in two different sketches, one of them available exclusively on YouTube. He is very involved in the love lives of random strangers he meets while cleaning buildings, often to their extreme annoyance. In his first appearance, he notices that two college classmates are attracted to each other and proceeds to interrupt their studying session with uncomfortable efforts to encourage the boy to tell the girl how he feels about her. Somehow, it works. His second appearance is in a gym, where he actually tries to prevent an exercising woman from being hit on by a very cocky man to whom he can tell the woman is not attracted. As usual, this somehow works.

==== Jason Bourne ====
Stephen Meek has appeared as Jason Bourne in three segments.

==== Just Jeremy ====
A segment exclusively featuring Jeremy Warner and focused on offbeat and quirky humor. Each segment begins with Warner facing stage right in the dark while a voice-over introduces Warner while making a ridiculously fake claim about him. The Just Jeremy theme is sung, Warner turns to face the audience, the lights are raised, and Warner addresses the audience about the subject of the segment. The set background is a wall with a vertical wood pattern and typically is adorned with framed pictures and shelves with objects which generally all have a matching theme. Warner wears a different T-shirt for each segment, typically featuring an animal. The segment concludes with Warner turning to face stage right again as the lights fall while the Just Jeremy theme is repeated. The only other person to have appeared on this segment is James Perry, who was impersonating Warner at the time. Debuted Season 2, Episode 2. There have been seven segments of Just Jeremy.

==== Lady Shadow ====
Played by Mallory Everton, is a spy who constantly infiltrates an unspecified base, with the evil commander played by Matt Meese. In episode one, Lady Shadow attempts and fails at retrieving an important CD, due to the fact she is pregnant. In part two, Lady Shadow succeeds as her newborn baby is used to take down the enemies. While once again, pregnant.

==== Lobster Bisque ====
A chef in tuxedo played by James Perry, who is obsessed with bisque. He often shouts "Lobster Bisque" or "World famous, you should try it, Lobster Bisque!" in his strange accent, much to the annoyance of other characters. He is also seemingly obsessed with the number 5. He debuted in Season 2, Episode 8. There have been five Lobster Bisque segments.

==== The Mad Scientist Creates... ====
The Mad Scientist, played by Matt Meese, is a Frankenstein-esque scientist re-creating things such as sports, Valentine's Day, and junior high school. He is accompanied by Igor, played by Mallory Everton. There have been three segments of The Mad Scientist.

==== The Martian Vlog ====
Jason Gray plays an obnoxious astronaut named Mark Watney, desperate for subscribers to his vlog about living in space. He is constantly in competition with Commander Clark played by Matt Meese, whose channel is extremely more popular than his. There have been five different segments of "The Martian Vlog".

==== The Microworld With Dr. Shoemaker ====
Dr. Shoemaker, played by James Perry, is not a cobbler, he's a British "doctor of science". The premise of the series is examining chemical reactions, in which there is a "Microworld", such as oscillating colors being a mini teenage drama. There have been three segments of "The Microworld".

==== Mr. Eckelstone ====
Matt Meese plays the aged Mr. Eckelstone, who characteristically exaggerates the danger of situations out of proportion, terrifying those around him. Mr. Eckelstone is a driver's education instructor, a Boy Scout leader, and a Lamaze instructor. His catchphrase is "Deer!" which he mistakenly yells while pointing his crippled right hand because of an enormous cataract in his left eye. Debuted Season 2, Episode 1. Mr. Eckelstone has appeared in four sketches.

==== Old Man ====
Played by Stephen Meek, he is a 91-year-old named Clark M. Richards who mispronounces and reads words incorrectly. More popularly called "Old Man", he has been featured in three sketches.

==== The Pilot ====
Played by Aaron Fielding. the pilot is a recurring character who only got employed because he was very good at speaking muffled into a microphone and has no other qualifications that are standard for pilots. The pilot has appeared in 3 sketches.

==== Puritan Roommate ====
Jedidiah Diligence Breckenridge III played by Jason Gray is the Puritan Roommate of Matt Meese. He loudly decries the actions of Matt and his friends as "The Devil's Work", believes women to be "The Offspring of the Serpent of Old" and often threatens them with belt lashings, burning at the stake, etc. Jedediah has appeared in three segments.

==== Scott Sterling ====
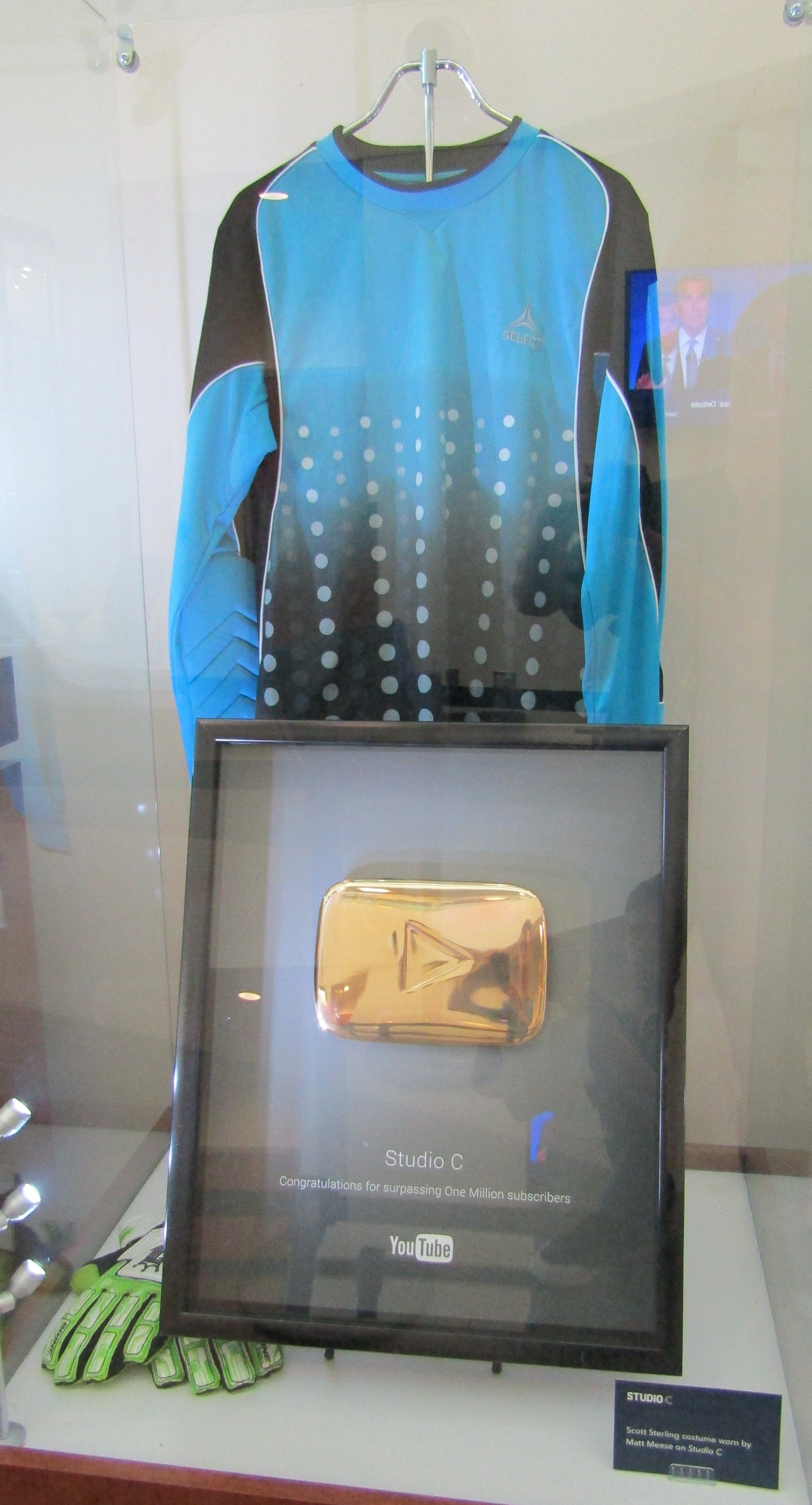
Sterling's uniform

Scott Sterling, played by Matt Meese, is a legendary soccer goalie who is known for blocking shots with his 'invincible' face. He is also seen playing volleyball. Jason Gray and Stephen Meek play the British announcers. This is by far the most popular character with over 100 million views on the first video on YouTube and over 70 million views on the second. Scott Sterling has been featured in four segments.

==== Severus Snape ====
Played by Jason Gray, Severus Snape of the Harry Potter franchise is commonly seen trying to get over the loss of Lily Potter, at the expense of others' love lives. He also co-hosts a parody talk show segment with Lord Voldemort, titled "Oh Snape!"

==== Sir Francis "Franny" François ====
A parody of the Scarlet Pimpernel, Franny is played by Jason Gray. Franny is an exaggeratedly effeminate British macaroni in the 18th century. To the consternation of his foil, the masculine Captain Blake (Matt Meese), Franny is adored by the ladies and is more effective at warfare and stopping crime. Franny is accompanied by his lute-playing assistant, played by Jeremy Warner. Debuted Season 1, Episode 9. Franny has appeared in three sketches.

==== Shoulder Angel/Devil ====
Matt Meese plays a life-sized shoulder angel. Humor results from the fact that Shoulder Angel feels the need to physically and awkwardly climb to a perch upon the right shoulder of the body of each character for which he attempts to act as a conscience. His catchphrase is "Poof!" which he says upon entering the scene. A variant on this skit is Shoulder Devil, also played by Meese, a life-sized, obese devil who also climbs the body of each character he attempts to tempt. In two sketches, Divine Comedy cast member McKay Lindsey also appears as a shoulder angel, appearing alongside Matt Meese. Adam Berg also briefly appeared as a shoulder angel in one sketch. Shoulder Angel made his first appearance during Studio C's pilot episode, while the series was still under the working title of "Common Room." As of December 2024, Shoulder Angel and Shoulder Devil have appeared in eleven sketches.

==== The Smiths ====
A family from rural Nebraska, Mr. Smith played by Jason Gray, Mrs. Smith played by Mallory Everton, Johnny Smith played by James Perry, and Martha May Smith played by Whitney Call, star in 2 videos in the style of Wes Anderson movies. They are about Mr. Smith's evil brother Barnaby Smith played by Matt Meese along with three other evil brothers played by Adam Berg, Stacey Harkey and Jeremy Warner trying to steal the family farm because they got jobs that they thought meant farmer (pharmacist, ant farm seller, Red Sox farm team, and law firm). Recurring themes include Grandpa dying, Mr Smith's lack of common sense, mixes between modern and past culture, iPhones being able to exist in the old times, women not being able to vote and the fact that being a democrat is illegal. There have been 2 Smith family sketches.

==== Spencer ====
A baby, voiced by Matt Meese, that has the maturity and mental capacity of an adult, yet retaining all the physical needs of an infant. He attends college and humor results in the discomfort others have when they interact with him. He had a romantic relationship with another infant similar to him, Evelyn DeWinter, voiced by Whitney Call, who is now a class TA at his college. Debuted Season 1, Episode 6. Spencer has appeared in four sketches.

==== Star Feraldo ====
Whitney Call plays an over-the-top diva whose success comes from appearing as an extra in hit movies. She however is delusional enough to believe that her appearance in these movies is what makes them successful, regardless of how little screen time she may get. Her comedy comes from her personality, her poor vocabulary, and her refusal to do many everyday things. Her catchphrase is "Ah Nah! I don't do mornings!" There have been three Star Feraldo sketches.

==== Susan Weebers ====
Played by Natalie Madsen, Susan (or Susie) Weebers is a twelve-year-old girl that runs a vlog called "Beauty Tips With Susan Weebers". She has a shifting, ad lib jingle. Her beauty tips are all humorously unsafe and inaccurate and her catchphrase is "Shut up, Carl!", in reference to her cat. There are four Susan Weebers segments.

==== Texas Hold'em ====
The Texas Hold'em Poker Championship is a popular poker tournament starring Jason Gray, Mallory Everton, Matt Meese, Jeremy Warner, and Adam Berg. Each competitor maintains a poker face, but viewers hear what they are thinking. Jason is playing for enough money to buy a kidney but loses and ends up with monkey kidneys which later explode. Mallory is cocky and wins originally, only to buy a solid gold boat and must pay off her debt. Matt has no idea how to play poker and does what Mallory does to give the illusion that he does but knows how to play later. Jeremy constantly freaks out and eventually dies of panic. Jeremy's apprentice is Adam, who never looks at his cards and spills Jeremy's ashes over the table. Other characters are the dealer, played by Stephen Meek, and the announcer, played by Whitney Call, who is only heard narrating the proceedings of the tournament, but is never physically seen onscreen. There have been two Texas Hold'em sketches.

==== Tongue-twisters ====
A sketch where members of the cast attempt to perform a very long tongue-twister. If any of the cast make a mistake, the sketch is immediately restarted. Each tongue-twister has a letter that they alliterate. The first one was d, the second was r and w, the third was s, the fourth and fifth were b, and the sixth was p. Recurring elements include Stacey Harkey eating food during the sketch and Mallory Everton appearing suddenly from an unexpected place. Adam Berg does not participate in the tongue-twister but is the victim of some form of slapstick comedy from something done by Jason Gray. However, in the third and sixth tongue-twister, Jason was the victim of the slapstick comedy from something done by Matt, Adam, or Stacey. The fifth tongue-twister was in season 14 which had a completely new cast apart from Jason Gray. A sixth tongue-twister aired during the 200th episode, featuring Matt, Jason, Adam, Mallory, Garet, and Dalton. Debuted Season 1, Episode 4.

==== V.I.S.C.I.P.A.M. (Video Instruction Series Can Inform People About Men) ====
Jason Gray plays Dr. Friedrich Schneider, a German academic who studies stereotypes of men who calls himself "the world's foremost authority on male anthropology". V.I.S.C.I.P.A.M. is filmed as a mockumentary that is Schneider's publication of his most recent findings. Each segment shows a different case study that is presented as observational fly on the wall footage in a lab room, narrated by Schneider, in which the male behavior is often greatly exaggerated for comic effect. The series includes an animated intro and a background musical theme. Debuted Season 2, Episode 2. There have been four V.I.S.C.I.P.A.M. segments.

==== Voldemort ====
Played by Matt Meese, this character is a sassy version of Voldemort from the Harry Potter series. He has made repeated appearances in Studio C productions.

==== Worst [Blank] Ever ====
A miniseries showing someone who is the worst at their job, e.g. "Worst Kindergarten Teacher Ever". The scenes are shot off-set at various locations, depending on the occupation. Debuted Season 3, Episode 2. The featured cast members include: Matt Meese—"Worst Doctor Ever"; Mallory Everton—"Worst Kindergarten Teacher Ever"; Jason Gray—"Worst Personal Trainer Ever"; Whitney Call—"Worst Lawyer Ever"; Jason Gray—"Worst App Ever"; Jeremy Warner—"Worst Waiter Ever"; James Perry—"Worst Cop Ever"; Stacey Harkey—"Worst Plumber Ever"; Stephen Meek—"Worst Psychiatrist Ever"; Natalie Madsen—"Worst Masseuse Ever"; Adam Berg—"Worst Ninja Ever"; Aaron Fielding—"Worst Mechanic Ever"; Dalton Johnson—"Worst Elf Ever"; and Tori Pence—"Worst Comic-Con Fan Ever."; Matt Meese—"Worst Funeral Director Ever" There have been fifteen segments of "Worst...Ever.

=== Seasons 10–13 ===
The following characters and themes have appeared in at least two sketches:

==== Great Performances Obscure Instrumentalist ====
The multi-instrumentalist is played by Garet Allen who wears a fashionable tailcoat and is accompanied by a pianist played by Jessica Drolet. Debuting in Season 10, Episode 4, the pair performed Beethoven's Moonlight Sonata, where Garet surprised the audience by using a melodica. The pair also appeared in episode 8 of the same season to perform a piece by Chopin, this time with Garet playing a stylophone (pocket synthesizer).

==== Interrupting News Lady ====
This lady seems to interrupt news reporters reporting about local news. She is played by Jessica Drolet. When first approached by news reporters, she has no knowledge of the events. But she suddenly remembers everything that happens, often stealing the spotlight from the actual people being interviewed. She debuts in Season 10 Episode 2 where she interrupts a news reporter reporting about a man who has fallen into a hole. She also appears in Episode 10 where she interrupts a news reporter reporting about a competition with the house that has the best Christmas lights.

==== Meet the Cast ====
A recurring segment where each cast member plays an interviewer who interviews them self (the actor). The interviews usually results in a very awkward interaction.

==== Video Love ====
A recurring segment of a retro-style (1980s) video dating service. Each member of the cast from season 10 plays a user of the service by recording a profile video about themselves and detailing what they are looking for in a romantic partner.

==== Timothy Brown ====
The only character introduced in season nine to appear in season ten. His first appearance was in "Love at first bite" from Season Nine, Episode Nine, and later reappeared in Episode Seven of Season Ten. He is very nervous around people (and large audiences) and often ends up embarrassing himself.

==== Cast Performance Review ====
A recurring sketch theme starring Chuck Meegan, the fictional executive of the show's network, BYUtv. In this segment, Meegan is shown in the form of a puppet, interviewing the members of the Studio C cast to see if they are good enough at their jobs for him to renew their contracts. The interviews normally entail awkward, silly, and mostly improvised conversation between the cast members and a puppet.

==== An Unabridged Adage From Benjamin Franklin ====
A series of short sketches showing Benjamin Franklin (played by Ike Flitcraft) at a desk writing in his journal. Franklin starts by going off on some humorous and seemingly random rant. He then states an actual adage from the writings of Benjamin Franklin that is funny in the context of what he'd said before.

==== The Fainting Goat Boys Show ====
A fictional sitcom starring Garret Allen, Tanner Gillman, and Matthew Galvan as three teenage boys that snuck onto a farm one day to cow-tip. To their dismay, there were only goats on the farm, but they tried to tip them anyway. The farmer wizard who lived on the farm was angered and half-turned them into myotonic (fainting) goats as punishment. The show always ends in the boys being scared by something and fainting, causing an outburst of canned laughter.
