= Saints and Soldiers (film series) =

Historical fiction WWII film series

- Official film series logo
- Based on: loosely on true stories
- Country: United States
- Language: English

The Saints and Soldiers film series consists of American war dramas, based loosely on true events. The plot overall explores various battles of World War II through the use of historical fiction, and uses an overarching message that people with unjustified predispositions over someone else can work together to overcome insurmountable odds; as well as the reality that they can learn to appreciate each other. Directed by Ryan Little from a concept he developed while in college, the movies depict the power of virtue, decency, and humanity of men, during the evils of war. Starring an ensemble cast, each installment is standalone in storytelling, but all set within historical reality.

Though the monetary figures of installments within the film series aren't publicly detailed, Saints and Soldiers (2004) was well received critically at film festivals, and financially turning a profit at the box office in part due to its indie-sized production budget. Winning 16 awards, the movie's success lead to the development and creation of the film series; with the sequels also earning a number of awards. The movies have been met with mixed critical reception, though well-received by the LDS community for their significance in the religion's influences on modern cinema.

== Development ==
Filmmaker Ryan Little developed the premise for the film series, while he was attending college at Brigham Young University. He developed a short film based on the concept of seeing an American soldier and a German Nazi soldier during World War II, trapped together in an isolated location and having to learn to get along. The short movie received a number of student awards, and turned a small profit from its $2,000 production budget.

Little would later expand on this concept, with the release of the titular feature film and its subsequent sequels. The first film was originally designated an R-rating from the MPAA, causing a small group including the President of Deseret Book and founder of Excel Entertainment Jeff M. Simpson to travel to Los Angeles and petition that they reconsider. Despite the lack of gore or profanity the MPAA took issue with "personalized violence" arguing that the audience would feel the impact more because they grow to care for the characters. Simpson explained that the intention was to teach viewers the consequences of their actions. The film rating was changed to PG-13 instead.

Little later stated, "all of the Saints and Soldiers movies have kind of a common theme, and that is how we perceive and judge others." In response to the positive reception from Military Veterans, he said: "...these films were our way to thank them. That has been extremely fulfilling."

== Films ==
Film	U.S. release date	Director	Screenwriter(s)	Story by	Producers
Saints and Soldiers	August 6, 2004	Ryan Little	Geoffrey Panos & Matt Whitaker	Geoffrey Panos	Adam Abel and Ryan Little
Saints and Soldiers: Airborne Creed	August 17, 2012	Ryan Little	Lamonte Grey & Lincoln Hoppe	Lamonte Grey & Lincoln Hoppe	Adam Abel and Ryan Little
Saints and Soldiers: The Void	August 15, 2014	Ryan Little	Ryan Little	Ryan Little	Adam Abel and Ryan Little
Saints and Soldiers: War Pigs	September 18, 2015	Ryan Little	Luke Schuetzle & Adam Emerson	Luke Schuetzle & Adam Emerson	Luke Daniels, Steven Luke, Brad Scott and Chad A. Verdi

=== Saints and Soldiers (2003) ===
In December 1944 during WWII, Adolf Hitler's Nazi military initiates an offensive strategy where the Germanic soldiers were ordered to open fire on unarmed prisoners. Playing dead, four American soldiers survive the massacre at Malmedy in Belgium, a location under control of the German army in Europe. After rescuing a British pilot who has intelligence regarding Germany's plans of war, they march together through the snow to reach the allied forces. As they try to survive enemy territory with only one weapon between them, each man begins to share their backgrounds with each other. When its learned that Cpl. Nathan "Deacon" Greer had previously served a mission in Germany for The Church of Jesus Christ of Latter-day Saints, the group begins to question his loyalties. Now with strained comradery, the group of soldiers must work together to reach their destination before it is taken over by Nazi military.

=== Saints and Soldiers: Airborne Creed (2012) ===
In August 1944 during WWII, a group of paratroopers in the airborne forces of the U.S. Army designated the 517th PRCT are tasked with infiltrating southern France via parachuting to support the Allied Forces on the ground; who were marching towards Berlin. Landing in enemy territory, the team is found to immediately come under attack by the Axis military. Determined to complete their mission and to reach the rendezvous point, three paratroopers become separated and find a small group of French resistance fighters who have been taken captive. Finding that the captives have formed a partisan military and that they are urgent need of assistance, the Americans decide to provide aid. Before completing their own assignments, the paratroopers help to liberate the group; all while striving to survive the events.

=== Saints and Soldiers: The Void (2014) ===
In May 1945 during WWII, the Nazi Germany armies are in retreat. Engaging in continued battles of war against the German remnants in a mountainous location that the U.S. military has nicknamed "The Void", American troops open fire on a prison using a M18 Hellcat freeing the Allied Forces who were held there. When it's realized that among the officers, included African-American militants division arises among their ranks due to racial prejudice. When the arguments further disrupt their order, a German Panzer III arrives taking aim at the Allied troops. Escaping the frontlines of the ongoing warzone Sgt. Jesse Owens leads a counter-attack with the help of Cpl. Carey Simms, as the pair learn to look past the social norms of society. Determined to complete their assignments, they are surprised to find they have more in common that initially believed and through their conditions begin to form a real friendship. As they fight for survival they devise a plan to overtake the attackers, which includes the use of the Nazi-developed panzerfaust weaponry on the German tank.

=== Saints and Soldiers: War Pigs (2015) ===
During WWII, the disgraced Cpt. Jack Wosick is tasked with a mission to lead an unlikely troop behind enemy lines to gather intelligence surrounding the developments of Nazi super weapon. With the assistance of an anti-Nazi German named Cpt. Hans Picault and a WWI veteran named A.J. Redding, Wosick must train a new squad before they complete their assigned mission. Despite the animosity in their ranks, he begins to earn the respect he needs from the troops to function as a unit. As they enter the German controlled territory its soon realized that the enemy is developing plans to use a massive V-3 artillery cannon which if used in the ongoing battles, would give the Axis powers an insurmountable advantage over the Allied Forces. The soldiers race against time to destroy the weapon, before its too late.

== Main cast and characters ==
List indicator

This section includes characters who will appear or have appeared in the franchise in main roles.

- An empty grey cell indicates the character was not in the film, or that the character's official presence has not yet been confirmed.

Character	Films			
Character	Saints and Soldiers	Saints and Soldiers: Airborne Creed	Saints and Soldiers: The Void	Saints and Soldiers: War Pigs
Cpl. Nathan "Deacon" Greer	Corbin Allred			
Pvt. Steven Gould	Alexander Niver			
Flt. Sgt. Oberon Winley	Kirby Heyborne			
Pvt. Shirley "Shirl" Kendrick	Larry Bagby			
SSG. Gordon "Gundy" Gunderson	Peter Asle Holden			
Cpl. James Rossi		Corbin Allred		
Sgt. Caleb Jones		David Nibley		
Cpl. Harland "Bud" Curtis		Jasen Wade		
Cpt. Erich Neumann		Lincoln Hoppe		
Tech Sgt. Jesse Owens			K. Danor Gerald	
Corp. Carey Simms			Adam Gregory	
Pvt. Daniel Barlow			Matt Meese	
Sgt. John Atwood			Timothy S. Shoemaker	
Rodney "Ramrod" Mitchell			Michael Behrens	
1st Lt. Cpt. Jack Wosick				Luke Goss
Cpt. Hans Picault				Dolph Lundgren
Sgt. McGreevy				Chuck Liddell
Col. A.J. Redding				Mickey Rourke
Cpl. Pvt. August Chambers				Noah Segan

== Additional crew and production details ==
Film	Crew/Detail					
Film	Composer(s)	Cinematographer	Editor(s)	Production companies	Distributing company	Running time
Saints and Soldiers	J. Bateman & Bart K. Hendrickson	Ryan Little	Wynn Hougaard	Go Films, Medal of Honor Productions LLC	Excel Entertainment Group	1 hr 30 mins
Saints and Soldiers: Airborne Creed	J. Bateman	Ryan Little	Burke Lewis & Rhett Lewis	Go Films, Cinedigm Entertainment Group, Koan Productions, Adam Abel Productions, Ryan Little Films	Purdie Distribution	1 hr 37 mins
Saints and Soldiers: The Void	James Schafer	Ryan Little	Burke Lewis & Rhett Lewis	Go Films, Cinedigm Entertainment Group, Koan Productions, Adam Abel Productions, Ryan Little Films	Purdie Distribution	1 hr 34 mins
Saints and Soldiers: War Pigs	Alex Kharlamov	Ty Arnold	Katerina Valenti	VMI Worldwide, The Fyzz Faculty, Verdi Productions, Schuetzle Company Productions, Ryan Little Films	Cinedigm Entertainment Group	1 hr 31 mins

== Reception ==
=== Box office and financial performance ===
Film	Box office gross			Box office ranking		Video sales gross	Worldwide total gross income	Budget	Worldwide total net income	Ref.
Film	North America	Other territories	Worldwide	All time North America	All time worldwide	North America	Worldwide total gross income	Budget	Worldwide total net income	Ref.
Saints and Soldiers	$1,310,470	—N/a	$1,310,470	#8,405	#14,089	Information not publicly available	>$1,310,470	$780,000	$530,470	
Saints and Soldiers: Airborne Creed	Information not publicly available	Information not publicly available	Information not publicly available	Information not publicly available	Information not publicly available	Information not publicly available	Information not publicly available	Information not publicly available	Information not publicly available	
Saints and Soldiers: The Void	Information not publicly available	Information not publicly available	Information not publicly available	Information not publicly available	Information not publicly available	Information not publicly available	Information not publicly available	Information not publicly available	Information not publicly available	
Saints and Soldiers: War Pigs	—N/a	$73,701	$73,701	#18,429	#25,370	Information not publicly available	>$73,701	Information not publicly available	≤$73,701	
Totals	>$1,310,470	$73,701	>$1,384,171	x̄ #6,709	x̄ #9,865	>$0	>$1,384,171	>$780,000	≥$604,171	

=== Critical and public response ===
Film	Rotten Tomatoes	Metacritic
Saints and Soldiers	66% (35 reviews)	56/100 (16 reviews)
Saints and Soldiers: Airborne Creed	TBA (4 reviews)	—N/a
Saints and Soldiers: The Void	TBA (2 reviews)	—N/a
Saints and Soldiers: War Pigs	TBA (1 review)	TBA (4 reviews)
