= Marcus Mailei =

American football player (born 1986)

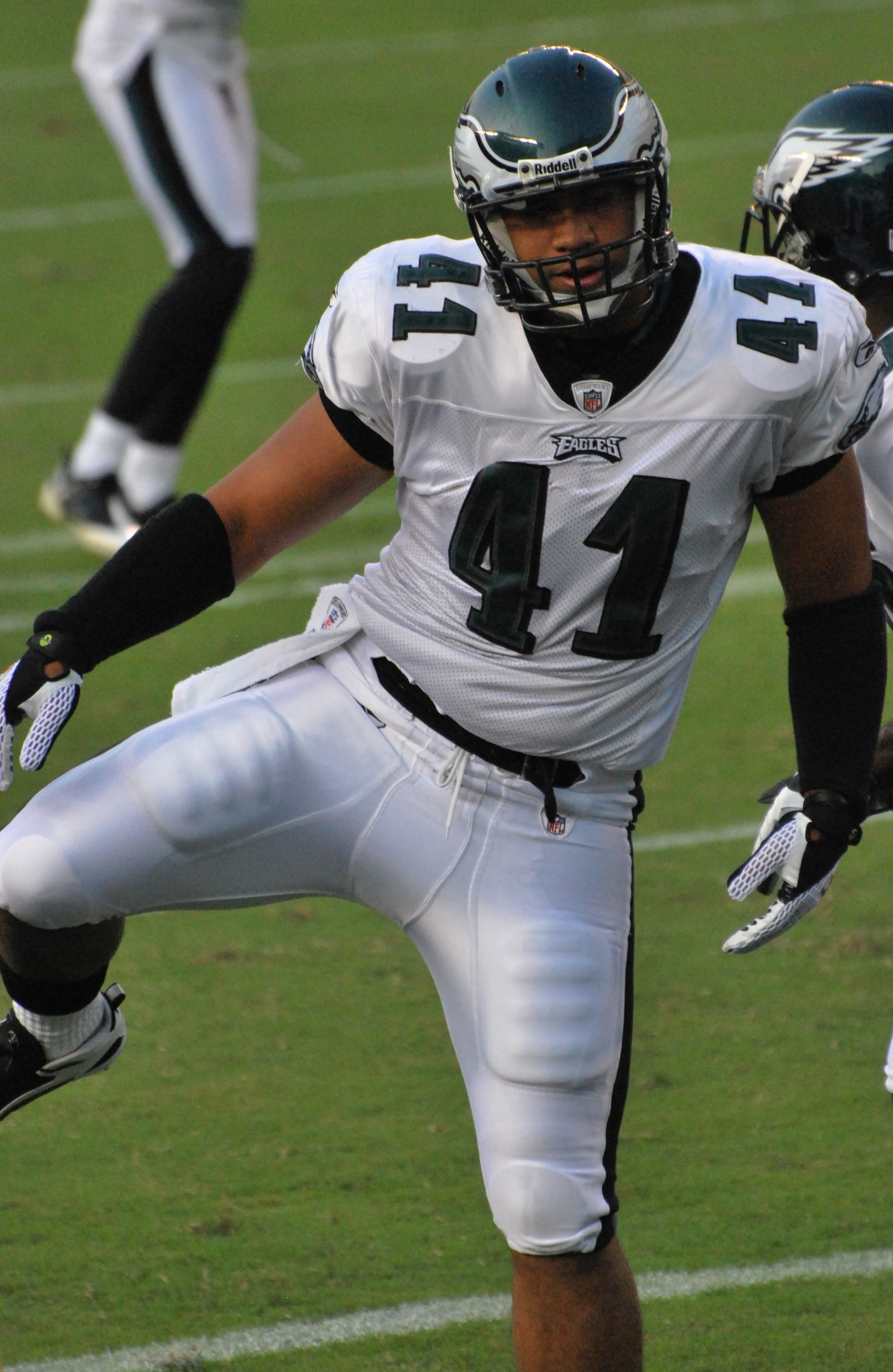
- Mailei in August 2009

No. 41
- Position: Fullback

Personal information
- Born: October 30, 1986 (age 40); Salt Lake City, Utah, U.S.
- Listed height: 6 ft 0 in (1.83 m)
- Listed weight: 255 lb (116 kg)

Career information
- High school: Highland (Salt Lake City, Utah)
- College: Weber State
- NFL draft: 2009: undrafted

Career history
- Philadelphia Eagles (2009)*; New Orleans Saints (2009−2010)
- * Offseason or practice squad member only

Awards and highlights
- Super Bowl champion (XLIV); 2× First-team All-Big Sky (2007, 2008)

Career NFL statistics
- Rushing yards: 0
- Rushing average: 0
- Rushing TDs: 0
- Stats at Pro Football Reference

Marcus Anthony Mailei (born October 30, 1986) is an American former professional football player who was a fullback in the National Football League (NFL). After playing college football for the Weber State Wildcats, he was signed by the Philadelphia Eagles as an undrafted free agent in 2009. He was a member of the New Orleans Saints from 2009–2010.

== Early life ==
Mailei attended Highland High School in Salt Lake City, Utah and was a letterman in football and rugby, playing for the famous Highland Rugby Team coached by Larry Gelwix. He was rated a two-star prospect by Rivals.com. He also appeared as an extra in the film Forever Strong about Gelwix's life.

Mailei is an Eagle Scout.

== College career ==
Mailei saw playing time in his freshman year in 2005, but was limited by a knee injury. In 2006, Mailei started all 11 games for the Wildcats and was Weber State's third-leading receiver with 241 yards and three touchdowns and also rushed for 72 yards and two scores, and earned Honorable Mention All-Big Sky honors. As a junior in 2007, Mailei saw a decrease in numbers, but established himself as the lead blocker for 4-time First-team All-Big Sky rusher Trevyn Smith, netting himself a First-team All-Big Sky selection. In 2008, Mailei entered the year with NFL potential, which brought him attention from NFL scouts. He took part in arguably Weber State's most successful season in program history, in which the Wildcats won their first Big Sky Championship in 40 years and advanced to the second round of the FCS playoffs. Mailei garnered another First-team All Big Sky Selection in 2008, in addition to a TSN Honorable Mention selection to the All-America Team.

Following his senior season, Mailei was invited to participate in the Texas vs The Nation all-star game in El Paso, Texas.

== Professional career ==
=== Pre-draft ===
Prior to the 2009 NFL Draft, Mailei was invited to the NFL Scouting Combine in Indianapolis, where he suffered from flu-like symptoms.

=== Philadelphia Eagles ===
Mailei was signed as an undrafted free agent by the Philadelphia Eagles on April 27, 2009. He was waived during final roster cuts on September 5, 2009, and re-signed to the team's practice squad on September 7, 2009.

=== New Orleans Saints ===
Mailei was signed off the Eagles' practice squad by the New Orleans Saints on December 9, 2009, after the team waived fullback Kyle Eckel, and played in two games. Eckel was re-signed on December 21 when Mailei was placed on season-ending injured reserve with a hamstring injury.

Mailei returned to the Saints in 2010 but suffered a leg injury during training camp; he was waived/injured on August 20, 2010, and subsequently reverted to the team's injured reserve list after clearing waivers the next day. He was waived on February 10, 2011.
