= 1998 kidnapping of Mormon missionaries in Saratov, Russia =

1998 kidnapping case

- Location: Saratov, Russia
- Date: 18 March 1998 – 22 March 1998
- Attack type: Kidnapping
- Victims: Andrew Propst; Travis Tuttle
- Perpetrators: Sergei Yemtsov; Alexei Shkryabin

On March 18, 1998, two missionaries of the Church of Jesus Christ of Latter-day Saints, Andrew Lee Propst and Travis Robert Tuttle, were abducted in Russia. One of the kidnappers had a friend invite the missionaries to his apartment in Saratov, where upon entry they were hit in the head, driven to a separate location, and photographed as part of the kidnappers' demand for $300,000. A ransom note was left at the house of a local member of the LDS Church. The missionaries were released on March 22 after four days in captivity, without the ransom being paid. It was the first major incident involving foreign missionaries to occur in the "Russian heartland."

== Abduction ==
Propst and Tuttle were abducted on Wednesday, March 18, 1998. They went to the apartment of a 20-year-old man – whom they had previously met at a church meeting – for an appointment to teach him more about their faith. When they arrived, they were "hit in the head with a metal baton multiple times, handcuffed, and tied up." Their eyes and mouths were taped shut.

The kidnappers demanded $300,000 and photocopies of the missionaries' passports in return for the safe release of Propst and Tuttle, and threatened to kill them if police were notified. When the captors did not call to arrange a meeting as promised in the ransom note, church officials thought that the media coverage had prompted them to kill the missionaries.

== Captivity ==
Propst and Tuttle were taken to a shed 45 minutes outside of Saratov, Russia, and handcuffed to a coal-fueled radiator so tightly that both suffered nerve damage. While in captivity, the two "played word games, practiced Russian grammar and devised a dream team of professional baseball players." They conversed frequently with the younger man who had kidnapped them, with topics ranging from sports to politics to religion; Propst hoped that forging a friendship might later prevent their captor from being able to kill them. Both Propst and Tuttle had read Dale Carnegie's book How to Win Friends and Influence People and tried using techniques from the book. One of the kidnappers shared his "life story" with the missionaries. Propst later told Idaho Business Review that his captors had been struggling financially, and that that was one of their motivations for kidnapping them. They were fed small portions of food once or twice per day and were given dirty water to drink. Their eyes remained taped the entire time.

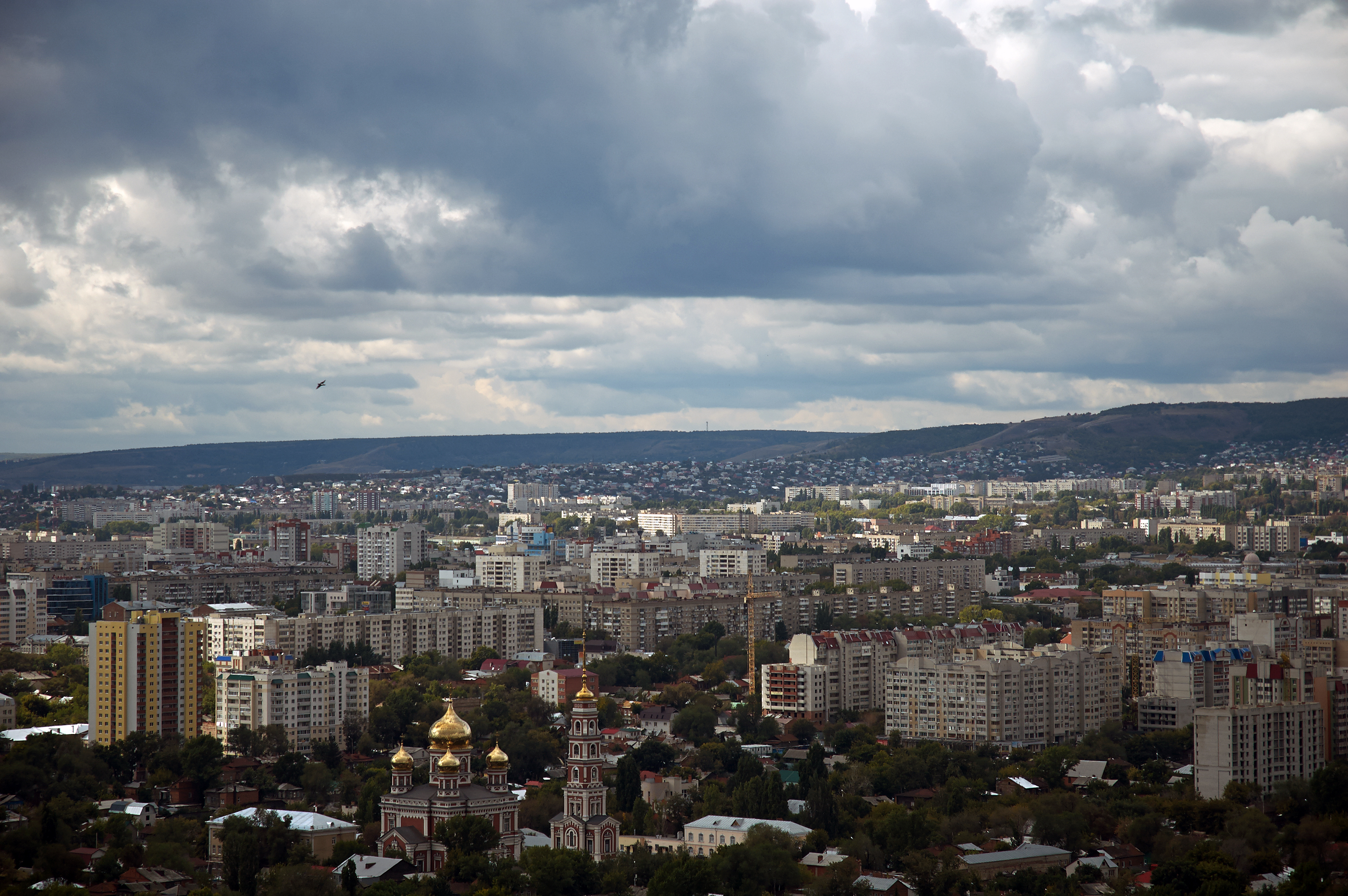
City of Saratov, Russia

Both missionaries escaped with only minor injuries, including soreness from the handcuffs and bumps from being hit in the head. After being released by their kidnappers outside of the city of Saratov, they found a ride back and called police and church officials. They were then brought to the police station and, under the protection of church officials and two American Embassy Consul officers, stayed in Saratov to help police find their kidnappers. The Mission president at the time, Donald Jarvis, stated that no ransom was paid. Both Propst and Tuttle finished their missionary service in England.

== Government response ==
Multiple U.S. politicians became involved in the case. Representative Merrill Cook of Utah told the Provo Daily Herald that he encouraged "aggressive American involvement in getting these boys back safely." The U.S. Department of State called the situation "a grave matter" and did not release details of the kidnapping at the time in order to protect the missionaries. Senator Bob Bennett commented that the captors were after money and not the LDS church specifically, and that he was coordinating efforts between church and government officials on the matter. He also used the opportunity to condemn a recent Russian law restricting minority religions. Senator Gordon H. Smith of Oregon, himself a member of the Church of Jesus Christ of Latter-day Saints, spoke with President Bill Clinton on the matter; President Clinton responded that he would help however he could. Four FBI agents were dispatched to Russia, one of which spoke Russian and was experienced in hostage situations. At a briefing, State Department spokesman James B. Foley said that the kidnapping was an "isolated incident," and that U.S. foreign policy with Russia in no way provoked the kidnappers. Secretary of State Madeleine Albright told Senator Gordon Smith after the release of the missionaries that the culprits set them free because "the noose was tightening." The First Presidency of the LDS church thanked American and Russian officials for their work.

The Russian FSB (Federal Security Service) also became involved during the abduction and after, particularly in arresting suspects. Worldwide Television News reported that Governor Dmitry Ayatskov of Saratov Region threatened to extract the remaining LDS missionaries from the region if the $300,000 ransom was paid. Ayatskov continued to say that "in the near future all missionaries, including Mormons, will be asked to find another place for their activities."

== Media ==
=== News coverage ===
News of the kidnapping was broadcast worldwide. American media entities such as The New York Times, the Los Angeles Times, CBS News, and CNN featured the story, along with British news outlets such as BBC News and The Guardian. The missionaries heard a news report of their kidnapping via radio while in captivity.

=== Film depiction ===
The 2013 film The Saratov Approach told the story of Propst and Tuttle's kidnapping. It was written, directed, and produced by filmmaker Garrett Batty. It featured Corbin Allred as Tuttle, Maclain Nelson as Propst, and Nikita Bogolyubov and Alex Veadov as the kidnappers. It grossed $2,146,999. Batty originally had the idea for the film when he first heard news of the kidnapping. He met with Propst and Tuttle, heard their story, and obtained permission from them to make the film. The cast and crew sought to keep the film as close to the true story as possible.

== Trial of the kidnappers ==
On March 24, 1998, local police found the woman who called in the ransom demand, as well as a 45-year-old man who assisted in the kidnapping; both confessed to being behind the abduction and were arrested. Russian officials reported that the man had helped establish the LDS Church in Saratov in 1993, but later left the faith. In August, Sergei Yemtsov was sentenced to four years in prison. 19-year-old Alexei Shkryabin received only two years probation. Propst and Tuttle attended the trial, during which the kidnappers were "locked in a steel cage in the corner of the courtroom." Yemtsov was proven to be the mastermind behind the operation; Shkryabin was "unaware of [his] intentions until the moment of the abduction."

== See also ==
- The Church of Jesus Christ of Latter-day Saints in Russia
