= Garrett Batty =

Director and filmmaker

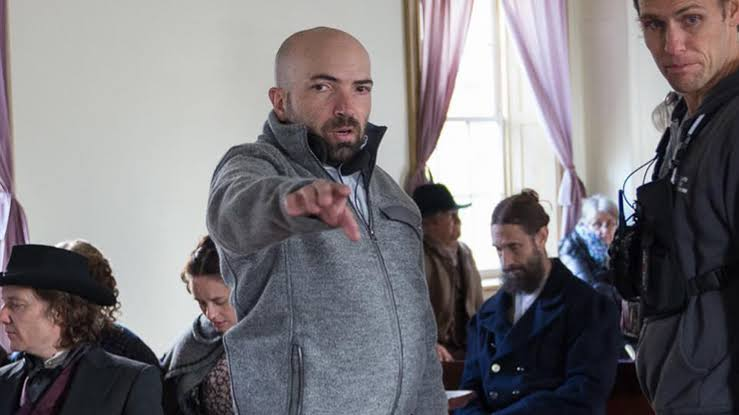
- Education: Brigham Young University
- Occupations: Director, Producer, Writer
- Years active: 2009-present
- Notable work: The Saratov Approach

Garrett Batty is an American film director, writer, and producer known for his film The Saratov Approach. He is a graduate of Brigham Young University and a native of Park City, Utah. He is a member of the Church of Jesus Christ of Latter-day Saints, (LDS Church) and his films are part of Mormon cinema, but with a more general audience. He has written, directed, and produced four full-length films, including Freetown (2015) and Out of Liberty (2019), and will begin work on a fifth in 2020. For Freetown, he was awarded the 2015 Ghana Movie Award for Best Screenplay alongside Melissa Leilani Larson.

== Early life and education ==
As a young boy in Park City, Utah, Batty began making short films. He attended Park City High School and often attended the Sundance Film Festival. In both high school and college, Batty participated in acting, improv comedy, and filmmaking. After serving an LDS mission in New York City, he graduated from Brigham Young University in 2001 with a film degree. He is a member of the Church of Jesus Christ of Latter-day Saints.

== Professional career ==
During his early career in Hollywood, Batty edited TV pilot episodes, trailers, and DVDs. He often worked with LDS film companies such as Excel Entertainment and Halestorm Entertainment. He later moved to Utah, where he and his wife adopted three children. He was inspired by LDS films such as The Singles Ward, and after moving to Utah, filmed Mormon Messages for the Church of Jesus Christ of Latter-day Saints. He began a production company, Three Coin Productions, in 1993. His short film "#Pound# 646" was shown at the 2008 LDS Film Festival and later compiled into the Best of LDS Film Festival 2008 DVD. In 2009 he wrote, directed, and produced Scout Camp, a movie about a group of boy scouts starring Shawn Carter and Kirby Heyborne. Batty drew from his own experiences as a boy scout, and the actors who played scoutmasters improvised many of their lines for comedic effect. According to Batty, the film produced enough money to "pay back all of [its] investors."

While continuing to work for the Church, he began working on The Saratov Approach, a film based on the true story of the 1998 kidnapping of LDS missionaries in Saratov, Russia. Batty first heard the story as a college student, and resolved to one day tell it through film. He obtained permission from the men who had been kidnapped, then began working on the script while recovering from heart surgery. It was released on October 9, 2013, and grossed $2.1 million; it was Batty's first theatrical release. According to The Daily Universe, Saratov "shattered all previous LDS movie records." After Saratov's success, Batty released another film documenting a true story about LDS missionaries, Freetown, in 2015. Filmed in six weeks in Ghana, it depicts the missionaries' struggles during the First Liberian Civil War. Batty worked alongside screenwriter Melissa Leilani Larson on Freetown, for which they were awarded the 2015 Ghana Movie Award for Best Screenplay. In 2019, Batty directed, wrote, and produced Out of Liberty, a drama western about the imprisonment of Joseph Smith, told from lesser-known jailer Samuel Tillery's perspective. It grossed $265,279. According to the Daily Herald, Batty will begin filming a movie about missionaries in the Philippines in 2020.

== Filmography ==
Year	Film	Director	Producer	Writer	Starring
2009	Scout Camp	Yes	Yes	Yes	Shawn Carter, Kirby Heyborne
2013	The Saratov Approach	Yes	Yes	Yes	Corbin Allred, Maclain Nelson
2015	Freetown	Yes	Yes	Yes	Henry Adofo, Michael Attram
2019	Out of Liberty	Yes	Yes	Yes	Casey Elliott, Corbin Allred, Brandon Ray Olive, Jasen Wade
2024	Faith of Angels	Yes	Yes	Yes	John Michael Finley, Cameron Arnett, Kirby Heyborne, Michael Bradford

== Awards and nominations ==
- Winner of the 2014 Filmed in Utah Award for Best Screenplay (The Saratov Approach)
- Winner of the 2014 Filmed in Utah Award for Best Director (The Saratov Approach)
- Winner of the 2014 Filmed in Utah Award for Best Feature Film (The Saratov Approach)
- Winner of the 2014 AML Award (film category) (The Saratov Approach)
- Winner of the 2015 Ghana Movie Award for Best Screenplay (Freetown, with Melissa Leilani Larson)
- Nominated for the 2015 Ghana Movie Award for Directing (Freetown)
- Nominated for the 2015 Ghana Movie Award for Best Picture (Freetown)
- Finalist for the 2015 AML Award (film category) (Freetown)
- Nominated for the 2016 Black Reel Award for Best Foreign Film (Freetown)
- Nominated for the 2016 Nigerian Entertainment Award for Best Picture (Non-Nigerian) (Freetown)
- Finalist for the 2019 AML Award (narrative-feature-film category) (Out of Liberty)
