= Adam Gregory =

Adam Gregory may refer to:

- Adam Gregory (singer)
- Adam Gregory (actor)
