= Saints and Soldiers: The Void =

- Theatrical release poster
- Directed by: Ryan Little
- Written by: Ryan Little
- Produced by: Adam Abel; Ryan Little
- Starring: K. Danor Gerald; Adam Gregory; Matt Meese; Ben Urie; Stacey Harkey; Bart Johnson
- Cinematography: Ryan Little
- Edited by: Burke Lewis; Rhett Lewis
- Music by: James Schafer
- Production companies: Go Films; Cinedigm Entertainment Group; Koan Productions
- Distributed by: Purdie Distribution
- Release date: August 15, 2014
- Running time: 94 minutes
- Country: United States
- Languages: English; German

Saints and Soldiers: The Void (also known as Saints and Soldiers: Battle of the Tanks), is a 2014 war drama film directed and written by Ryan Little. It serves as the third installment in the Saints and Soldiers film series, and is a standalone sequel to Saints and Soldiers: Airborne Creed. The film stars K. Danor Gerald, Adam Gregory, and Matt Meese. The Void was the most expensive of the Saints and Soldiers films due to its use of tanks. It was filmed in Alpine, Utah. The film received mixed reviews with some critics calling it a "riveting drama" and some critics stating that more focus on writing and execution would have improved the film.

== Plot ==
In May 1945, remnants of the German army continue to fight in the Harz mountains. The rapid advance of Allied forces into Germany has opened a widening gap between the farthest advancing forces, or spearhead, and the "critical rearguard" following them. This stretch of battle-scarred land is nicknamed "The Void" by American troops.

An American M18 Hellcat tank destroyer nicknamed "The Avenging Angel" fires on the watchtower of a German POW camp, allowing the Allied prisoners to flee. Among them is a British lieutenant named Goss. The freed prisoners are assembled for transport to the rear. Sergeant Jesse Owens, formerly of the 827th Tank Destroyer Battalion, has been reassigned to drive one of the trucks in the convoy. Owens, an African-American, is not respected by some of the white soldiers.

Captain Briton McConkie orders Sergeant Atwood, commander of "Angel", and Sergeant Whitaker commanding another M18 nicknamed "Annie", to clear out an area still defended by Germans. Atwood's crew includes Corporal Simms and the bickering Privates Barlow and Mitchell. Meanwhile, the trucks encounter a fake body in the road and a hidden German Panzer III tank destroys the truck driven by Private Perry, killing everyone inside. Owens escapes with Goss when his truck is also destroyed.

The M18 crews encounter a German man named Frederick and his family, and let them all go even though Frederick clearly has been in German service recently. They next encounter Owens and Goss who have evaded pursuing Germans. Realizing at least one German tank is waiting in ambush, and unable to contact headquarters by radio, the crews of the M18s decide to proceed and a fight ensues with three German tanks. "Annie" is destroyed and only Whitaker survives while Atwood is killed as "Angel" escapes.

Owens and Simms argue about what to do next. Simms refuses to take orders from a black man regardless of rank. When Owens suggests taking on the Germans again, Simms accuses him of trying to make a name for himself by needlessly risking their lives. Their argument is cut short by the arrival of a German tank. Using an improvised antenna, the crew of "Angel" contact headquarters; however, a jeep carrying an Allied general has already left and is driving into the German ambush. Owens and Simms man a nearby artillery piece and fire at the German tank; they miss, but then "Angel" destroys the tank with two shots. Goss approaches another German tank and shoots the commander, then kills the rest of the crew through the hatch. A shot from a third German tank hits "Angel" and jams its turret. Owens and Simms slip away from the German infantry, kill a team of Germans hiding in an old mill, and obtain a Panzerfaust.

Owens (as shown in a flashback) is the only survivor of a group of four African-American soldiers; in the Colmar Pocket, they were caught drinking and sent on a suicide mission as punishment. Goss (as shown in a flashback earlier) had escaped the POW camp with two other soldiers and was recaptured; forced to play Russian roulette by a German officer named Shönbeck, the other two soldiers were killed. Shönbeck, a former tank instructor, is now in command of the German unit waiting in ambush.

Goss takes one of Shönbeck's soldiers hostage. Shönbeck shoots his own soldier, but is himself shot by one of the other Germans before he can kill Goss.

"Angel" draws the last German tank out and lures it into driving over a cellar where Owens has concealed himself. He destroys the tank by firing the Panzerfaust at the tank's belly. Barlow and Mitchell reconcile while Simms and Owens emerge from the battle as friends.

== Cast ==
- K. Danor Gerald as Technical Sergeant Jesse Owens
- Adam Gregory as Corporal Carey Simms
- Matt Meese as Private Daniel Barlow
- Timothy S. Shoemaker as Sergeant John Atwood
- Michael Todd Behrens as Rodney 'Ramrod' Mitchell
- Ben Urie as Lieutenant Goss
- Christoph Malzl as Stalag Commander
- David Morgan as Lt. Klaus Shönbeck
- Nate Harward as POW camp Soldier
- Brenden Whitney as Pvt. Nelson
- Jeff Birk as Capt. F. Briton McConkie
- Joel Bishop as Sgt. Max Whitaker
- Alex Boyé as Pvt. Perry
- Allan Groves as Sgt. Kesler
- Logan Rogan as Prisoner #1
- Blake Webb as Prisoner #2
- Jeff Johnson as Crossroads MP
- Philip Malzl as Frederick Kardoff
- Becca Ingram as Gerta Kardoff
- Aunna Abel as Aunna Kardoff
- Lance Jensen as Corporal Jensen
- Randy Beard as German Tank Commander
- Andrew W. Johnson as Private Wolsey
- Richie T. Steadman as Sergeant Steadman
- Scott Swofford as General Terry Allen
- Terence Johnson as Corporal Harrison
- Lonzo Liggins as Pvt. Cooper
- Carlton Bluford as Pvt. Smitty
- Stacey Harkey as Pvt. Gaines
- Bart Johnson as Capt. Derrick Davis
- Cardiff Gerhardt as Young Soldier #1
- Taylor Risk as Young Soldier #2
- Talon G. Ackerman as Fritz Bauer

== Production ==
Ryan Little wrote the script for Saints and Soldiers: The Void a few years before it was released. He had K. Danor Gerald picked out for the role of Owens before production even started, having worked with Gerald on Forever Strong and House of Fears. Saints and Soldiers: The Void was the most expensive to film of the Saints and Soldiers franchise, because of the use of tanks. Ryan Little and Adam Abel gathered tanks from Utah, New Mexico, Colorado, and Arizona to use for filming. It was filmed in Alpine, Utah. During production, Gerald would be the last cast member to eat lunch to better understand racism for his role of an African-American soldier.

== Release and reception ==
The film was released on August 14, 2014, in a select number of theaters. The film was released on DVD in November 2014. Saints and Soldiers: The Void received mixed reviews. The Salt Lake Tribune called the film a, "riveting action drama with a strong message". However, Deseret News wrote that the film, "offers an important message and some nice visuals. But there's still the feeling that a little more focus on writing and execution would have etched a more enduring experience."

== Sequel ==
A standalone sequel titled Saints and Soldiers: War Pigs was released in 2015.
