= The Saratov Approach =

2013 American dramatic thriller film

Saratov Approach
- Directed by: Garrett Batty
- Written by: Garrett Batty
- Produced by: Garrett Batty; Jake Van Wagoner; Maclain Nelson; Jonathan Turner
- Starring: Corbin Allred; Maclain Nelson; Nikita Bogolyubov; Alex Veadov
- Cinematography: Jeremy Prusso
- Edited by: Connor O'Malley
- Music by: Robert Allen Elliott
- Production companies: Three Coin Productions; Saratov Films
- Distributed by: Purdie Distribution
- Release date: October 9, 2013
- Running time: 1 hr 47 min
- Country: United States
- Languages: English; Russian
- Box office: $2,146,999

The Saratov Approach is a 2013 American dramatic thriller film written and directed by Garrett Batty. It depicts the 1998 kidnapping of two missionaries of the Church of Jesus Christ of Latter-day Saints (LDS Church) in Saratov, Russia. It began a limited release on October 9, 2013, solely in Utah. Subsequently, the film was released throughout the Mormon Corridor. On January 10, 2014, the film began an expanded limited release throughout the United States.

== Plot ==
It is March 1998, and two young missionaries for The Church of Jesus Christ of Latter-day Saints, Andrew Lee Propst (Maclain Nelson) and Travis Robert Tuttle (Corbin Allred), are serving in southeastern Russia. While out in the city of Saratov, the two are approached by a man named Nikolai (Nikita Bogolyubov) who asks them to come to his apartment to teach him and a friend about their faith. When the Elders arrive the next day, Nikolai and another man named Sergei (Alex Veadov) beat them, tie them up, and kidnap them. They drive to a remote location where the missionaries are handcuffed to a pipe, held at gunpoint, and photographed. The kidnappers demand a ransom of $300,000. Propst and Tuttle's families are informed of their sons' kidnapping; Propst's father receives a call from Senator Gordon H. Smith (Bart Johnson), who informs him that he is doing everything he can to resolve the issue.

Meanwhile, in Russia, Propst and Tuttle spend five days in captivity. Propst is convinced that Nikolai will have compassion on them and eventually let them go, so he asks him for small favors, like food, a bathroom, and being moved to a more comfortable position - all of which Nikolai grants. Sergei is less kind; he grows impatient that the ransom money still hasn't been paid, and has the missionaries write to their families, in hopes that it will speed the payment of the ransom. Back in the U.S., news of the kidnappings spreads nationwide, and people of many faiths begin to pray for the two hostages. The Propst family receives an anonymous check for the demanded $300,000, but ultimately decide not to pay it, as it would encourage the kidnapping of more missionaries for easy money. The Tuttle family receives a call from Mark Larsen, who was kidnapped as a missionary in Argentina years earlier. Larsen explains that with time, the missionaries will develop more hope and faith and start to show compassion to their captors.

This proves to be true; Propst manages to remove his handcuffs and devises a plan with Tuttle to escape, but the two then remember their purpose as a missionaries and put their cuffs back on instead of fighting their way out of captivity. Nikolai then confides in the Elders, confessing his guilt for kidnapping them; he explains that his girlfriend is pregnant, and he helped Sergei kidnap "rich Christians" so that he would have money to provide for a family. The Elders ask about a tattoo on Sergei's hand, which Nikolai tells them came from his days as a Russian Naval hero and means "forever loyal."

The next morning, Sergei announces that their time is up, and drives Tuttle and Propst to a snowy field. As Sergei prepares to kill them, he notices that the missionaries have drawn markings on their hands similar to his tattoo, giving him pause. He and Nikolai drive away, leaving Tuttle and Propst to run away and find their way back to Saratov. Their families are informed that they have been freed, and that Nikolai and Sergei have been arrested by Russian officials. Propst and Tuttle speak over the phone to their families, and finish their missions elsewhere in Europe.

== Cast ==
- Corbin Allred as Elder Tuttle
- Maclain Nelson as Elder Propst
- Nikita Bogolyubov as Nikolai
- Alex Veadov as Sergei
- Bart Johnson as Senator Gordon H. Smith

== Production ==
Director Garrett Batty had wanted to make a film about the kidnapping of the LDS missionaries ever since he first heard their story in the news. Years later, he contacted Propst and Tuttle with the intention of making a movie about their experiences in Russia; the two were skeptical at first, but met with Batty and shared their story. Batty wrote the script after his conversation with Propst and Tuttle, balancing the actual events with his own artistic vision for the film. Production hit multiple snags: Batty underwent heart surgery shortly after his meeting with Propst and Tuttle, and financial backing took a while to manifest. The outdoor scenes set in Russia were filmed in Kyiv, Ukraine, and the scenes of the missionaries' captivity and their families back home were filmed in Utah, USA.

Batty wrote, directed, and produced the film, along with producers Maclain Nelson, Jonathan T. Turner, and Jake Van Wagoner. Jeremy Prusso was the cinematographer, Connor O'Malley was the editor, Heather Reid was the production designer, and Robert Allen Elliott composed the film's score.

== Reception ==
The Salt Lake Tribune praised the film as having "quietly resolute strength." The film was also praised by Deseret News and Meridian Magazine. The Standard-Examiner called the film "one of the best in the Mormon film genre". A Motley Vision gave the movie a B+. The Hollywood Reporter described it as "an item best suited to the believers." The Los Angeles Times reached a similar conclusion, calling Saratov "soft and preachy." Larry King, who had a private screening of the film, described it as "intense, dramatic, [and] beautifully acted."

Variety reported that the film made "$500,000 in two weeks on only 23 screens." The same article detailed the film's positive reception among younger Latter-day saints, particularly on social media, as well as requests from AMC, Cinemark, and Regal to host the film in more of their theaters. Screen Daily reported that Saratov then made $1.4 million after four weeks. It made $2.1 million overall after a 64-week theatrical release. It was rated PG-13 for violence.

== See also ==
- The Church of Jesus Christ of Latter-day Saints in Russia
- LDS cinema
- 1998 kidnapping of LDS missionaries in Saratov, Russia
