= Larry Bagby =

American actor and musician (born 1974)

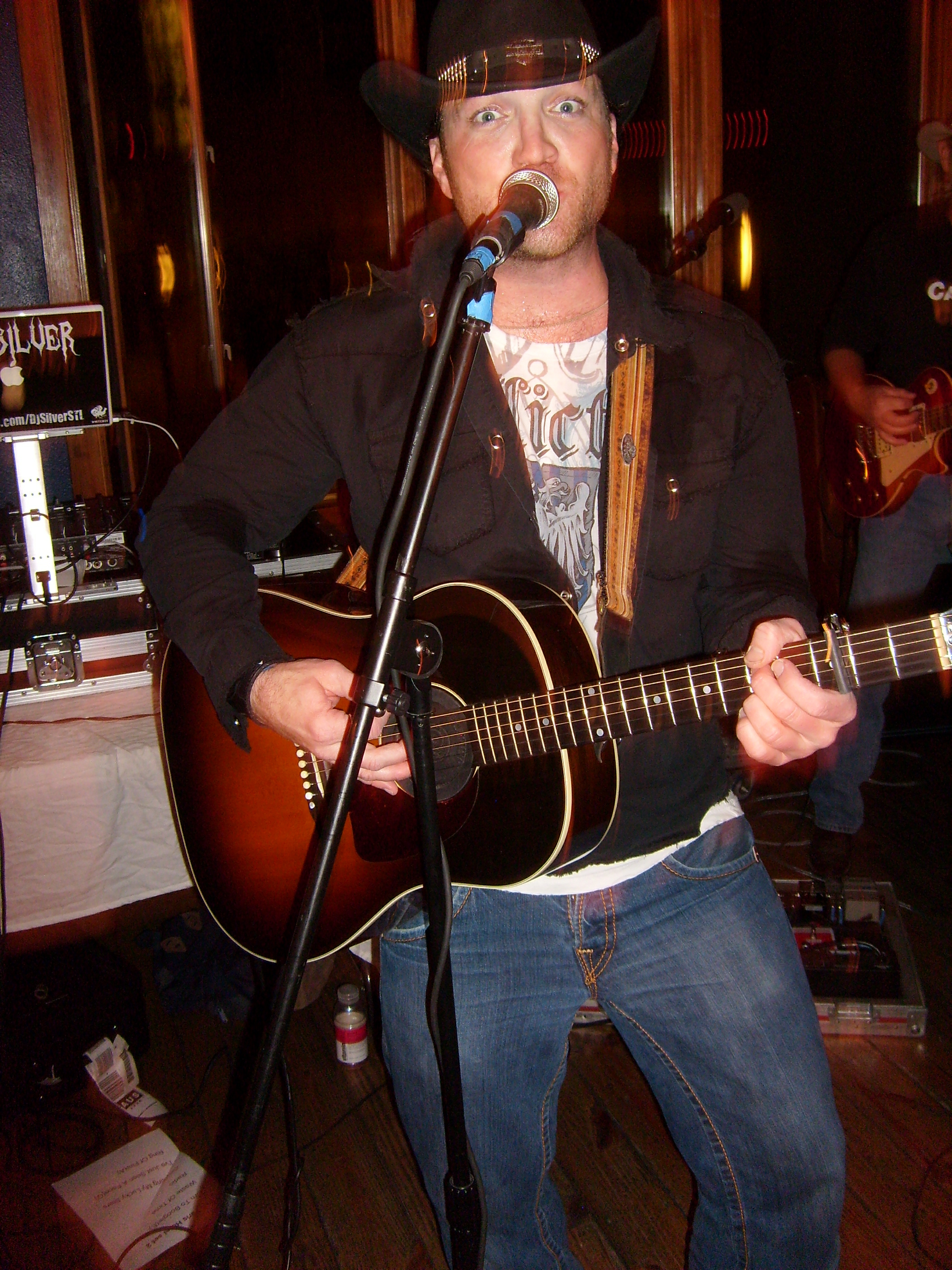
- Bagby plays in 2009
- Born: Lawrence Bagby III; March 7, 1974 (age 52); Marysville, California, U.S.
- Occupations: Actor; musician
- Years active: 1988–present
- Spouse: Veronique Dumont (m. 2025)
- Website: www.larrybagby.com

Lawrence Bagby III (born March 7, 1974) is an American actor and musician, who is best known as Ernie 'Ice' in Hocus Pocus, Larry Blaisdell in Buffy the Vampire Slayer, Pvt. Shirley "Hickey" Kendrick in Saints and Soldiers, Marshall Grant in Walk the Line, and Frank Ellis in The Young and the Restless.

== Early life ==
Bagby was born in Marysville, California. His father was a member of a dance band. From 1994 to 1996, Bagby served in the Argentina Córdoba Mission of the Church of Jesus Christ of Latter-day Saints.

== Career ==
Besides his appearances in Buffy the Vampire Slayer, Saints and Soldiers, Walk the Line, and The Young and the Restless, Bagby has also had featured appearances on television shows including CSI: Crime Scene Investigation, Cold Case, Malcolm in the Middle and JAG. As a teenager, he acted in Airborne and Hocus Pocus.

Bagby is also a musician. In 2005, he released his first album entitled Where I Stand, followed by his 2007 EP On The Radio which includes Counting My Lucky Stars featured on a TV episode of Cold Case. Bagby has performed and toured with WS Holland, Rodney Blake Powell, and Lisa Horngren of The Tennessee Three.

== Personal life ==
On October 5, 2025, Bagby married Veronique Dumont at The Pickering House in Salem, Massachusetts.

== Filmography ==
=== Film ===
Year	Title	Role	Notes
1988	Invasion Earth: The Aliens Are Here	Tim	
1993	Airborne	Jimbo	Disney Channel Premiere Films
1993	Hocus Pocus	Ernie aka 'Ice'	Disney Channel Premiere Films
2000	L.I.N.X.	Technician	
2000	God's Army	Cop #1	
2001	Black Friday	Stevens	
2002	Move	Nate / Jimmy / Dalton	Short
2003	The Trip	Carl	
2003	Nephi and Laban	Laman	Direct-to-Video Film
2003	Saints and Soldiers	Pvt. Shirley 'Shirl' Kendrick	
2004	The Butcherer	The Creepy Guy	Short
2005	Walk the Line	Marshall Grant	
2006	Church Ball	Blake Blacken	
2006	Pirates of the Great Salt Lake	Drake/Young Man	
2007	Believe	Adam Pendon	
2008	Backyard Battle Monsters	Slicer the Sword Master	Short
2008	Bluetiful	Will	Short
2008	The Interlopers		Short
2008	Forever Strong	Coach Cal	
2010	The Trial	Spencer Hightower	
2011	Age of the Dragons	Flask	
2013	T. and Sugar	Red	Short
2014	Hypnophobia	Harvey	
2019	Out of Liberty	James Ford	
2021	The Job	Dad	
2022	Father Stu	Bartender	
2024	Horizon: An American Saga – Chapter 1	Bill Landry	
2025	Band on the Run	Thomas	

=== Television ===
Year	Title	Role	Notes
1989	Mr. Belvedere	Ernie	Episode: "Big"
1989	Thirtysomething	Bob Stanton	Episode: "Michael's Campaign"
1992	The Wonder Years	Senior Guy	Episode: "Homecoming"
1993	Getting By	Brad	Episode: "The Pit Stop"
1993	Saved by the Bell: The New Class	J.T.	Episode: "A Kicking Weasel"
1994	CBS Schoolbreak Special	Lug	Episode: "Love in the Dark Ages"
1996	High Incident	Rich Kid #2	Episode: "Christmas Blues"
1997	Married... with Children	Clements	Episode: "Chicago Shoe Exchange"
1997–1999	Buffy the Vampire Slayer	Larry Blaisdell	6 episodes
1997–2000	JAG	Security Guard	3 episodes
1999	Mutiny	Bailiff	TV movie
2001	CSI: Crime Scene Investigation	Hank Dudek	Episode: "Too Tough to Die"
2002	100 Deeds for Eddie McDowd	Big Train McCann	Episode: "Teacher's Pet Peeve"
2002	Any Day Now	Police Officer	Episode: "Boys Will Be Boys"
2003	Dragnet	Uniformed Police Officer	Episode: "Coyote"
2004	Malcolm in the Middle	Aide	Episode: "Reese Joins the Army: Part 2"
2005	Everything You Want	Darwin	TV movie
2005	ER	Second Reporter	Episode: "The Providers"
2006	Huff	LAPD #1	Episode: "Sweet Release"
2008–2009	The Young and the Restless	Frank Ellis	12 episodes
2009	20% Off	Jack	Short
2012	NCIS	Craig Wilson	Episode: "Recovery"
2013	Ray Donovan	Gene	Episode: "Bridget"
2018	9-1-1	Car Wash Owner	Episode: "Point of Origin"
2021	Coffee & Contemplation Live	James Ford	1 episode
2021	Dwight in Shining Armor	Principal	2 episodes
2022	Alien Abductions with Abby Hornacek	Sheriff	Episode: "Incident at Pascagoula"
