= War Pigs (film) =

- Theatrical release poster
- Directed by: Ryan Little
- Written by: Luke Schuetzle; Adam Emerson
- Produced by: Luke Daniels; Steven Luke; Brad Scott; Chad A. Verdi
- Starring: Luke Goss; Dolph Lundgren; Chuck Liddell; Noah Segan; Mickey Rourke
- Cinematography: Ty Arnold
- Edited by: Katerina Valenti
- Music by: Alex Kharlamov
- Production companies: Schuetzle Company Productions; VMI Worldwide; Verdi Productions
- Distributed by: Cinedigm; Rialto Distribution; Signature Entertainment; VMI Worldwide
- Release dates: May 23, 2015 (GI Film Festival); September 18, 2015 (United States)
- Running time: 91 minutes
- Country: United States
- Language: English

War Pigs (also released as Saints and Soldiers: War Pigs in the international markets), is a 2015 American action war film directed by Ryan Little, from a script co-written by Luke Schuetzle and Adam Emerson. It is the fourth installment in the Saints and Soldiers film series, and is a standalone sequel to Saints and Soldiers: The Void. The film stars Luke Goss, Dolph Lundgren, Chuck Liddell, Noah Segan, and Mickey Rourke.

== Plot ==
Disgraced World War II United States Army Captain Jack Wosick is given the opportunity for redemption when asked to lead a rag-tag unit of misfits known as the War Pigs on a secret mission to go behind enemy lines to gather intelligence on a Nazi developed Super Weapon the V-3, a massive artillery cannon which would give the Nazis an insurmountable advantage against the Allies. With the help of Captain Hans Picault, a German anti-Nazi serving with the French Foreign Legion and Colonel A.J. Redding, a battle hardened WW1 veteran, Jack must train, lead and earn the respect of his new squad to become a functioning reconnaissance unit.

== Cast ==
- Luke Goss as Captain / 1st Lieutenant / Captain Jack Wosick
- Dolph Lundgren as Captain Hans Picault
- Chuck Liddell as Sergeant McGreevy
- Mickey Rourke as Colonel A.J. Redding
- Noah Segan as Private / Corporal August Chambers
- Steven Luke as "Preacher"
- Ryan Kelley as Private William York
- Jake Stormoen as Private Frenchy Buckle
- K.C. Clyde as Private Moffatte
