= Olan Montgomery =

American pop-artist (1963–2020)

- Born: Timothy Olan Montgomery; April 12, 1963; Warner Robins, Georgia, US
- Died: April 4, 2020 (aged 56); New York City, US
- Known for: Mixed-media canvas
- Movement: Pop art

Timothy Olan Montgomery (April 12, 1963 – April 4, 2020), best known as Olan Montgomery or simply as Olan, was an American actor and pop artist specializing in mixed-media portraiture. He was active in New York City art circles as a photographer, painter, author, and actor in film and television. He died during the COVID-19 pandemic due to complications brought on by COVID-19.

== Biography ==
=== Early years ===
Timothy Olan Montgomery was born April 12, 1963, in Warner Robins, Georgia, the second of identical twins born to Eslye Lee Moate and Gary Misner Montgomery. He spent most of his youth in Macon, Georgia, graduating in 1980 from Northeast High School in that city.

Following graduation he attended the Columbia University in New York City.

=== Artist ===
Montgomery left college to begin his career as a make-up artist, working for several major modeling agencies in New York City, and for a number of prominent fashion magazines, including WWD, Glamour, Mademoiselle, Seventeen, and Cosmopolitan.

Later in life, going only by his middle name of Olan, he was active in New York art circles as a photographer and painter.

Montgomery was notable for his pop-art portraits as well as depictions of social issues, hate crime, and the gay party scene. He employed several techniques including one where his own photographic portraits were transferred to canvas and overlaid with paint or plastic, frequently making use of vibrant color in the process.

"My media now is I take pictures, I paint on them, and I create different things," Montgomery told the New York Times in 2003, "so it's a combination of digital and plastic and acrylic — all the things that I think are modern art utensils for today."

In March 2008 Village Voice columnist Michael Musto reviewed a book of Montgomery's unique portraiture, POP: Art Inspired by New York's Own Subcultures from Celebrity to Subway: Something More through Color and Light. Musto, himself a subject of Montgomery's work, described the artist's creative process:

"Olan starts by taking a photo of you while telling you how meaningful you are to society and/or how you have penetrating eyes. Then he does painty or digital things to the photo and emerges with a portrait that's generally super colorful and very true."

"My work is an effort to capture an essence and place it into a perpetual freeze frame," Olan told Musto. "Why can't a nanosecond last forever?"

In addition to more everyday themes, such as a multi-canvas study of the tellers of his local bank, Olan made himself known for his takes on celebrities, including images of Boy George, Justin Bond, and Rufus Wainwright, as well as Anne Hathaway, and Courtney Love.

=== Actor ===
Montgomery began to study acting as the first decade of the 21st century drew to a close. Beginning with a 2011 appearance in Boardwalk Empire, Montgomery found a place as a supporting actor in a lengthy series of television shows and feature films. He appeared in the 2014 film Appropriate Behavior as well as Hollywood Dirt (2017), Haymaker (2017), Alterscape (2018), Already Gone (2019), and The Irishman (2019).

Montgomery and his twin brother also starred as conjoined twins in the 2016 short Ham Heads, following up on a joint appearance in Frankie: Italian Roulette, a film which won the 2015 Oaxaca Film Fest in Mexico and the Nostro D'Argento in Rome in 2016.

Montgomery's final large screen role came in 2020 with an appearance in The Roads Not Taken, directed by Sally Potter.

He appeared in supporting roles on the television series My New Roommate (2014), The Blacklist (2017), Stranger Things (2019), and FBI: Most Wanted (2020).

In addition to appearing in the work of others, Montgomery wrote and produced several of his own short films, including Rush Call Clown (2016), three films released in 2017 — Silence =, Toggle, and Al & Ollie — and 2018's Babies to the World.

=== Death and legacy ===
In March 2020, Montgomery was hospitalized with COVID-19 at Long Island Jewish Medical Center in New York, one of the hospital's first victims of the pandemic virus. He was sustained on a ventilator for 26 days before showing signs of recovery and being removed. However, his health subsequently turned for the worse, and he died on April 4, 2020, of complications of the respiratory virus, aged 56.

In a 2009 interview Montgomery was asked by interviewer Manuel Dawson how he would like to be remembered by posterity. Montgomery replied:

"I would like to be remembered as the artist that cared and hopefully was able to use my art to bring people together or at least provided the platform through art to begin a dialogue based in mutual respect without preconception and judgment. I would hope that the work be remembered as a moment in pop culture when the importance of the individual became relevant and no longer reduced and devalued like washing powders and news headlines. We are vibrant individuals and we all count."

== Works ==
- Big Al in the Big City. (New York: Olan Montgomery, 2009).
- Dolls. (New York: Olan Montgomery, 2010).
- The Fast and Furious 15 Minute Make-Up Book. (New York: Olan Montgomery, 2008).
- Little Things Green Save Our Plant. (New York: Olan Montgomery, 2007).
- Not a Size 2. (New York: Olan Montgomery, 2009).
- POP: Art Inspired by New York's Own Subcultures from Celebrity to Subway: Something More through Color and Light. (New York: Olan Montgomery, 2008).
- POP: Olan 2008 Catalog of Original Paintings, Giclees & Prints by Artist Olan for Art Expo NYC 2008. (New York: Blurb.com, 2008).
- Rays Every Heart Observes By Oceans Through Heaven. (New York: Olan Montgomery, 2009).
