= Age of the Dragons =

- Directed by: Ryan Little
- Written by: Gil Aglaure; Anne K. Black; McKay Daines
- Produced by: Gil Aglaure; Devin Carter; McKay Daines; Steven A. Lee; Joe Pia; Peter Urie; Fred Huet
- Starring: Danny Glover; Vinnie Jones
- Edited by: John Lyde
- Music by: J. Bateman
- Distributed by: KOAN; Metrodome Distribution
- Release date: March 4, 2011 (United Kingdom)
- Running time: 91 minutes
- Country: United States
- Language: English
- Budget: $5 million
- Box office: $1 million

Age of the Dragons is a 2011 fantasy film directed by Ryan Little and starring Danny Glover and Vinnie Jones. A fantasy-themed reimagining of Herman Melville's classic 1851 novel, Moby-Dick, it was released in the United Kingdom on March 4, 2011.

== Plot ==
Harpooner Ishmael (Corey Sevier) joins Ahab (Danny Glover) and his crew on the Pequod, in this instance an armored land boat that hunts for dragons. The seven-strong crew ostensibly seeks the precious "vitriol", a highly explosive liquid substance found inside the fire-breathing winged creatures, which powers the mythical realm they live in. Ishmael joins their quest, and soon learns that in fact, Ahab's mission is one of revenge on a particular great white dragon that decades ago scarred and injured him, and killed his sister. Forced to hide from the sunlight due to the burn wounds on his body, Ahab now tries to kill all dragons, and especially the white one. Conflict arises through a romantic entanglement between Ishmael and Ahab's adopted daughter Rachel (Sofia Pernas), which causes hostility from the jealous hothead Flask (Larry Bagby). In the white dragon's lair, Ahab's secrets are revealed and Rachel must choose between following him on his dark quest or escaping to a new life with Ishmael. She chooses the latter and in a final confrontation, Ahab's spear, which was tied to his foot, becomes entangled in the White Dragon's neck. The creature flies off with a screaming Ahab, until he is slammed against a rock pillar and silenced. The white dragon flies off into the distance, with Ahab's body clinging on to it.

== Cast ==
- Danny Glover as Ahab
- Vinnie Jones as Stubbs
- Corey Sevier as Ishmael
- Sofia Pernas as Rachel
- Larry Bagby as Flask
- Kepa Kruse as Queequeg
- Nico Valencia as Bingzters
- David Morgan as Starbuck

== Development ==
The film was originally going to be called Dragon Fire. On February 3, 2010 it was announced that Danny Glover and Vinnie Jones had joined the cast, and that filming would begin in Utah the following week. The film's budget was around $5 million, and was the first film developed by distribution company Metrodome. A video from the set was revealed on March 5, 2010. Several of the scenes were filmed at Castle Amphitheater in Provo, Utah behind the Utah State Hospital. Other filming locations included Stone Five Studios in the Riverwoods Business Park. Glover was quoted as saying "This is a great idea ... it's going to be fun." The trailer for the film was released on October 15, 2010.

The dragons in the film have back legs only and on the ground use their wings as front legs like pterosaurs did.

== Reception ==
The film received almost universal negative reviews in the British press. The Guardian (1 star out of 5) wrote: "A textbook lesson in how not to adapt a literary classic – though it's so spectacularly bad, it could well achieve mythical status of its own . . . The deadly serious tone just makes it funnier; there's not a whale in sight but this movie blows." The Observer stated "This crude picture, shot in snow-covered Utah, where the Pequod becomes a battle engine on large wooden wheels, is unamusingly ridiculous." Variety added "Generic dialogue and dull incident. Shoddy CGI indicates a production budget that's fatally inadequate for the task at hand." Little White Lies (1 star out of 5) stated "While ropey CG monsters, half-baked stabs at drama, awkwardly-choreographed action sequences and wooden acting are all part of the fun, neither the script, nor Little's direction revel enough in camp or B-movie thrills to give Age of the Dragons true schlock value . . . This pittance fails to make Age of the Dragons anything more than disposable. Expect to find it wedged among the 'Two for £10' DVDs in a year's time, tantalising you with the promise of a so-bad-it's-good quickie. But beware: here be dragons."
