= Alterscape =

2018 science fiction horror film

- Directed by: Serge Levin
- Written by: Serge Levin
- Produced by: Jon Keeyes; Matthew Panepinto
- Starring: Michael Ironside; Charles Baker; Alex Veadov
- Production company: Isle Empire Pictures
- Release date: February 23, 2018 (Philip K. Dick)
- Country: United States
- Language: English

Alterscape is a 2018 science fiction horror film written and directed by the American actor and filmmaker Serge Levin. The film stars Michael Ironside, Charles Baker and Alex Veadov, produced by Jon Keeyes and Matthew Panepinto.

Alterscape had its world premiere at the Philip K. Dick Science Fiction Film Festival on February 23, 2018, in New York, where the film won the Philip K. Dick Best Feature award. Alterscape was produced by Isle Empire Pictures, a subsidiary of Isle Empire Holding.

== Synopsis ==
After a suicide attempt, Sam Miller (Charles Baker), coping with loss and depression, submits to a series of trials that fine-tune human emotions, but his unique reaction to the tests send him on a journey that transcends both physical and perceived reality. Under the supervision of Doctor Julian Loro (Michael Ironside), Sam undergoes a series of experiments to scan and alter human emotions.

== Cast ==
- Michael Ironside as Doctor Julian Loro
- Charles Baker as Sam Miller
- Alex Veadov as Doctor Kaine Egres
- Serge Levin as Ray Miller
- Todd Lewis as Edward Irving
- Debbie Rochon as Nurse Jane Toppan
- Alex Lane as Cruz
- Mack Kuhr as Devino
- Olan Montgomery as The Controller & Trucker
- Antonio D. Charity as Gills
- Tim Duquette as Dr. Elsi Nivel
