= Diamonds (1999 film) =

1999 film by John Mallory Asher

- Directed by: John Mallory Asher
- Written by: Allan Aaron Katz
- Produced by: Patricia Green
- Starring: Kirk Douglas; Dan Aykroyd; Corbin Allred; Jenny McCarthy; Kurt Fuller; Lauren Bacall
- Cinematography: Paul Elliott
- Edited by: Carroll Timothy O'Meara; David L. Bertman
- Music by: Joel Goldsmith
- Production companies: Total Film Group; Cinerenta
- Distributed by: Miramax Films
- Release date: September 6, 1999
- Running time: 91 minutes
- Language: English

Diamonds is a 1999 American comedy drama film directed by John Mallory Asher and written by Allan Aaron Katz. The film stars Kirk Douglas, Dan Aykroyd, Lauren Bacall, Jenny McCarthy and Corbin Allred.

Several clips from Douglas' 1949 film Champion are used to illustrate his character Harry Agensky's career as a boxer.

== Plot ==
Harry Agensky is a one-time welterweight boxing champion who lives in Canada with his son Moses. Harry's other son, Lance, feels that his father never really cared about his dreams and ambitions and now Lance has little affection for Harry. However, Lance's relationship with his teenage son Michael is not faring much better.

Lonely since the death of his wife Ellie and infirm due to a stroke, Harry wants to retire to a ranch in Northern Canada, but he can't afford the property. Lance invites Harry along for a skiing trip with Michael; Harry agrees, but at the last minute he talks them into going to Nevada instead. Harry claims he threw a fight years ago and was paid off in a cache of diamonds that he hid somewhere in Reno; if he can find the gems, he'll be able to buy the ranch. Lance is dubious, but he gives in to Harry's determination and the three head for Nevada, hoping to find the diamonds.

On the way there, the men visit a local brothel run by madame Sin-Dee, when Harry convinces the group, so that he can have sex for the first time in eight years.18-year-old grandson Michael gets Lance to let him join so that he can lose his virginity. Following their quest for the hidden diamonds, both father and son learn a lesson about reconciliation and the price of growing older.

== Cast ==
- Kirk Douglas as Harry Agensky
- Dan Aykroyd as Lance Agensky
- Corbin Allred as Michael Agensky
- Lauren Bacall as Sin-Dee
- Kurt Fuller as Moses Agensky
- Jenny McCarthy as Sugar
- Mariah O'Brien as Tiffany
- June Chadwick as Roseanne Agensky
- Lee Tergesen as Border Guard
- Val Bisiglio as Tarzan
- Allan Aaron Katz as Mugger
- Roy Conrad as Pit Boss
- John Landis as Gambler
- Joyce Bulifant as June
- Liz Gandara as Roxanne
- James Russo as Damian (uncredited)

== Reception ==
On the review aggregator website Rotten Tomatoes, 26% of 35 critics' reviews are positive, with an average rating of 4/10. The website's consensus reads: "Kirk Douglas' flinty performance fails to overshadow an otherwise dull and cliche-ridden affair." Metacritic, which uses a weighted average, assigned the film a score of 33 out of 100, based on 23 critics, indicating "generally unfavorable" reviews.

== Home media ==
The film was released on VHS by Miramax Home Entertainment on July 18, 2000. In 2010, Miramax was sold by The Walt Disney Company (their owners since 1993), with the studio being taken over by private equity firm Filmyard Holdings that same year. Filmyard sublicensed the home video rights for several Miramax titles to Echo Bridge Entertainment, who released Diamonds on DVD on May 8, 2012. Miramax was then taken over by Qatari company beIN Media Group during March 2016. In April 2020, ViacomCBS (now known as Paramount Skydance) acquired the rights to Miramax's library, after buying a 49% stake in the studio from beIN. Diamonds was one of the 700 titles Paramount acquired in the 2020 deal.
