= Saints and Soldiers =

- Theatrical release poster
- Directed by: Ryan Little
- Screenplay by: Geoffrey Panos; Matt Whitaker
- Story by: Geoffrey Panos
- Produced by: Adam Abel; Ryan Little
- Starring: Corbin Allred; Alexander Niver; Kirby Heyborne; Lawrence Bagby; Peter Asle Holden
- Cinematography: Ryan Little
- Edited by: Wynn Hougaard
- Music by: Jason Bateman; Bart Hendrickson
- Production companies: Go Films; Medal of Honor Productions LLC
- Distributed by: Excel Entertainment Group
- Release date: August 6, 2004
- Running time: 90 minutes
- Country: United States
- Languages: English; German
- Budget: $780,000
- Box office: $1.3 million

Saints and Soldiers is a 2003 war drama film directed by Ryan Little and produced by Little and Adam Abel. It is loosely based on events that took place after the Malmedy massacre during the Battle of the Bulge. The film stars Corbin Allred, Alexander Niver, Lawrence Bagby, and Peter Asle Holden as four American soldiers trying to return a British airman with vital intelligence to the Allied lines.

After researching World War II and the Battle of the Bulge, Little began shooting in January 2003 in Utah. Filming lasted 30 days. Little and Abel were able to save money on production by recruiting a group of World War II reenactors who volunteered their services, costumes, and props. Excel Entertainment released the film at festivals to garner publicity before it was released to the public. The movie won numerous Best Picture awards from over 15 film festivals.

Critical reception was generally positive with praise towards the message, story, performances (particularly of Allred and Niver), production values, and action sequences. Though the screenplay, pacing, and ties to Mormonism were criticized by some reviewers, several film scholars argued that despite the Latter Day Saint (LDS)-related themes, the film appeals to a wide audience.

The movie's success launched its titular film series, including three standalone sequels.

== Plot ==
During the Battle of the Bulge in 1944, the Germans opened fire on their American prisoners of war, in what is known as the Malmedy massacre, killing many troops as they try to run away. Medic Steven Gould (Alexander Niver) manages to escape with Corporal Nathan 'Deacon' Greer (Corbin Allred). Gould and Deacon are joined by two other survivors, Shirl Kendrick (Larry Bagby), a member in Gould's division, and Deacon's close friend Sergeant Gordon Gunderson (Peter Asle Holden). The four stumble on RAF pilot Flight Sergeant Oberon Winley (Kirby Heyborne). Winley explains he has important intelligence he has to get back to the Allies and the group decide to try and reach the Allied lines, located some 20 mi (32 km) away. The group fights against German troops, a winter storm, and personal conflict to return Winley to Allied territory.

== Cast ==
- Corbin Allred as Corporal Nathan "Deacon" Greer
- Alexander Niver as Private Steven Gould
- Kirby Heyborne as Flight Sergeant Oberon Winley
- Larry Bagby as Private Shirley "Shirl" Kendrick
- Peter Asle Holden as Staff Sergeant Gordon "Gundy" Gunderson
- Ethan Vincent as Rudolph Gertz
- Melinda Renee as Catherine Theary – Belgian woman
- Ruby Chase O'Neil as Sophie Theary – Catherine's daughter
- Lincoln Hoppe as German soldier

== Production ==
=== Development ===
Ryan Little's first project was the short film The Last Good War, which won a Student Emmy. Little wanted to produce a World War II themed feature film. In 2002, Little teamed up with producer Adam Abel to create the production company, Go Films. After finding a private investor in California, Little and Abel sought to produce the film on a budget of $780,000. The original title of the film was "Saints and War".

Before the film had a script, the filmmakers scouted filming locations, determining the film's plot based on available locations and props. They researched World War II events and interviewed World War II veterans to develop the story and characters.

=== Casting ===
Little and Abel quickly cast Corbin Allred and Kirby Heyborne. However, because Heyborne had roles in many other films related to the Church of Jesus Christ of Latter-day Saints (LDS Church), they instructed Heyborne to grow a mustache, dye his hair, use a British accent, and smoke during the movie. Because Heyborne did not smoke, he smoked herbal cigarettes and practiced regularly to appear authentic. Additionally, Heyborne did not have access to a dialect coach so he became familiar with British accents by watching other films. Heyborne was concerned that this would make him a target for film critics.

To save on costs, Little and Abel made extensive use of World War II hobbyist reenactors who volunteered to travel to Utah and bring their authentic-looking prop equipment at their own expense.

=== Filming ===
Principal photography took place in early 2003 over 30 days in Utah, Wasatch, and Salt Lake counties in Utah. Camera angles were carefully positioned to avoid showing the Wasatch mountains on camera to create the illusion of being in the Ardennes.

Filming was done in January to use the available snow, but production had to use potato flakes when there was not enough snow. Moreover, a tight filming budget required actors to do their own stunts. Snow and freezing temperatures were challenges to filming, which was worsened by the period clothing costumes.

=== Historical inaccuracies ===
Several members of the 101st Airborne Division are depicted as being present at the massacre. In reality, the 101st was held in strategic reserve by SHAEF at this point in time to recover from combat in Operation Market-Garden. The 101st did not reach the front until December 18 (the massacre was on the 17th), and was sent to Bastogne, far to the south of where Kampfgruppe Joachim Peiper operated. Most of the victims were from the 285th Field Artillery Observation Battalion.

== Distribution ==
=== Rating ===
Saints and Soldiers was originally rated "R" by the MPAA, solely for war violence and related images. The director, writers, and producer wanted a "PG-13". Some criticism has been leveled against the MPAA rating board with regard to their rating independent films more harshly than those of the large studios. (See also "LDS cinema and MPAA ratings".)

While the MPAA never communicated any specific scenes that warranted the rating, Deseret News film critic Chris Hicks speculates that the reason may be due to two scenes, one in which depicts Nazis executing prisoners of war and another that shows a closeup of a leg wound. Producers made edits to receive the PG-13 for commercial distribution, and was officially granted such on March 30, 2004.

=== Release ===
The first screening took place at Pearl Harbor, Hawaii, to an audience of U.S. Naval officers and their spouses. The film opened at film festivals nationwide.

Saints and Soldiers represents the first LDS film produced after 2000 to be exhibited in film festivals before general release to gain publicity. It was the highest-grossing film released by Excel Entertainment, an entertainment section which targets an LDS audience. It grossed over $1 million.

=== Critical reception ===
The reaction to Saints and Soldiers was generally positive. The Washington Times called the film, "one of the sharpest and most compelling entries of the early 'Mormon cinema' era". The New York Times wrote that the film's, "impressive cast of largely unknown actors...[and] meticulously researched film tells its story with quiet conviction". However, Variety insisted that the script had "letdowns", including anachronisms in the dialogue and other story incongruities, yet they commended the production value considering the film's low budget. Roger Ebert of The Chicago Sun-Times gave Saints and Soldiers 3 stars out of a possible 4, writing it “isn’t a great film, but what it does, it does well". He complimented the straightforward storytelling and creative use of its limited budget which were reminiscent of war films from earlier decades: "[the film] could have been made in 1948. That is not a bad thing."

Ted Fry in The Seattle Times added that "the film is intended as a propaganda piece for the Church of Jesus Christ of Latter-day Saints, but the messages are very subtle, and the movie does have a place in the new WWII genre", and is "appropriate for mainstream audiences". Furthermore, scholar Travis T. Anderson, affirmed that films made by LDS filmmakers such as Saints and Soldiers and Napoleon Dynamite can still develop "widespread attention" or "critical acclaim". He continued by stating that neither appeals to an exclusively LDS audience nor alienates non-LDS audiences. Moreover, scholar Terryl Givens argued that Saints and Soldiers can be interpreted specifically or universally. Givens claimed that the screenwriting created a film that is authentically Mormon yet reaches to a myriad of audiences. Although ties to Mormonism in the film have been criticized by some, Gideon O. Burton called the film, "among the most-praised films of the Fifth Wave [of Mormon cinema] to date".

=== Home media ===
Saints and Soldiers was released on video and DVD in May 2005.

== Legacy ==
Saints and Soldiers won the 2004 Jury Award for Best Feature at the Stony Brook Film Festival. Furthermore, the film won the award for best picture at 13 other film festivals. The film was nominated for Best First Feature at the 20th Film Independent Spirit Awards in 2004, losing to Garden State.

=== Sequel ===
A standalone sequel titled Saints and Soldiers: Airborne Creed, was released on August 17, 2012.
