= Out of Liberty =

- Film poster
- Directed by: Garrett Batty
- Written by: Stephen Dethloff; Garrett Batty; S. McKay Stevens
- Produced by: Garrett Batty; S. McKay Stevens
- Starring: Jasen Wade; Brandon Ray Olive; Casey Elliott; Corbin Allred
- Cinematography: Jeremy Prusso
- Music by: Robert Allen Elliott
- Distributed by: Purdie Distribution; Samuel Goldwyn Films
- Release date: September 13, 2019
- Running time: 111 min
- Country: United States
- Language: English

Out of Liberty is a 2019 film directed by Garrett Batty, starring Jasen Wade as deputy jailer Samuel Tillery. The film tells the story of Joseph Smith (Brandon Ray Olive), his brother Hyrum Smith (Casey Elliott), and four other men being held in Liberty Jail while they await trial for treason. The film's main character, played by Jasen Wade, is the jail's deputy jailer, Samuel Tillery. The film was produced out of a movie producing industry in Utah the New York Times called a "Mini-Hollywood". Descendants of Joseph Smith were included in an early screening.

Based on true accounts, the film tells its story using elements from western, prison-break, and Latter-day Saint film genres.

== Plot ==
=== Synopsis ===
"On the American frontier, Joseph Smith and five other prisoners’ attempt to escape the dungeon of Liberty Jail as they are repeatedly thwarted by deputy jailer Samuel Tillery. While keeping the prisoners inside, Samuel is also busy keeping angry mobs outside from breaking in and killing the prisoners. As Samuel tries to keep the prisoners safely in jail until their day in court arrives, he begins to wonder whether or not justice might be given to them better in some other way."

=== Detailed ===
The film opens with Joseph Smith speaking with his lawyer Alexander Doniphan about his and his fellow prisoners’ upcoming trial. Below them, in the dungeon of the jail, the other five prisoners are planning an escape attempt. When the lawyer leaves, and the prisoners are brought up alongside Joseph, this first escape attempt fails, as Lyman Wight is too sick to make it out the door – and the prisoners decide they cannot leave without him.

The next day, before another escape attempt, the prisoners receive visitors – Porter Rockwell and Cyrus Daniels. This second escape attempt, like the first, fails when Tillery and his two guards fight against the prisoners and keep them locked inside. Hearing of this escape attempt, a mob from nearby Liberty comes for some frontier justice, to kill the prisoners for their escape attempt. The prisoners are defended by the jailer.

Rockwell later returns to give the prisoners tools with which they begin to tunnel out of jail – the beginning of a third escape attempt.

During the process of their tunneling out of jail, a court of inquiry is held in which it is decided if the prisoners will go to trial for treason. Court is held in a schoolhouse, as a mob intent on killing the prisoners prevented them from being brought into the courthouse, and the mob shows up to the courthouse to threaten the judge and the prisoners if the prisoners are to be let free. During the trial, Sidney Rigdon, representing himself, convinces Judge Turnham to let him free. The other prisoners return to jail.

It is discovered that the prisoners are tunneling out of jail, and their hole is filled in.

In a moment of despair, Smith prays for guidance, and receives comfort through revelation. This is the revelation later canonized in the Doctrine and Covenants scriptures.

As the prisoners are being transported to another jail for trial there is a final showdown between the mob, the jailer, and the prisoners. After this showdown the prisoners are allowed to escape, by their jailer, Samuel Tillery.

== Cast ==
- Jasen Wade as Samuel Tillery
- Brandon Ray Olive as Joseph Smith
- Casey Elliott as Hyrum Smith
- Brock Roberts as Sidney Rigdon
- Morgan Gunter as Lyman Wight
- Adam Johnson as Caleb Baldwin
- Danny James as Alexander McRae
- Corbin Allred as Porter Rockwell

== Reception ==
Sean P. Means of The Salt Lake Tribune gave the film 3/4 stars, noting Brandon Ray Olive's "quiet soulfulness" in his portrayal of Joseph Smith.

Margaret Blair Young said Out of Liberty is, "one of the most significant films of the past decade, particularly for Latter-day Saints," and that it is "a film which every LDS family (and perhaps every family) should see and take its children to see–ages twelve and up."

Rachel Wagner gave the film 8.5/10 stars and said it is, "a well written, moving character piece that is both a study of faith and a Western jailbreak survival story."

The film won second place at the 2020 LDS Film Festival's "Feature Film Competition" behind T. C. Christensen's film The Fighting Preacher.

The film was nominated for eight Utah Film Nominations through the Utah Film Awards. Those nominations were in: Picture, Director, Ensemble Cast, Actor, Supporting Actor, Cinematography, Music and Sound.
