= Saints and Soldiers: Airborne Creed =

- Theatrical release poster
- Directed by: Ryan Little
- Written by: Lamonte Grey; Lincoln Hoppe
- Produced by: Adam Abel; Ryan Little
- Starring: Corbin Allred; David Nibley; Jasen Wade
- Cinematography: Ryan Little
- Edited by: Burke Lewis; Rhett Lewis
- Music by: J. Bateman
- Production companies: Go Films; Cinedigm Entertainment Group; Koan Productions
- Distributed by: Purdie Distribution
- Release date: August 17, 2012
- Running time: 97 minutes
- Country: United States
- Language: English

Saints and Soldiers: Airborne Creed is a 2012 war drama film directed by Ryan Little and produced by Little and Adam Abel. It is the second installment in the Saints and Soldiers film series, and is based on events that took place during the invasion of Southern France in World War II. The film stars Corbin Allred, David Nibley, and Jasen Wade. The film was shot in Utah, on a tight budget, saving money by using volunteer World War II reenactors as some of the actors and extras. The film received mixed reviews; many critics found the film mediocre, yet still praised the performances and cinematography.

== Plot ==
In August 1944, the Allies have invaded German-occupied Southern France. German Army Second Lieutenant Erich Neumann (Lincoln Hoppe) executes two French men. On the early morning of August 15, paratroopers from the 517th Parachute Regimental Combat Team land in Provence, France, under heavy fire from the Germans. Two soldiers, Corporals Harland 'Bud' Curtis (Jasen Wade) and James Rossi (Corbin Allred), land separately. Curtis is spotted by a German patrol and quickly surrenders. After throwing a grenade to distract the Germans, Rossi kills the entire patrol and rescues Curtis. The two set off towards their intended landing area before finding an abandoned shelter where they are followed by Curtis's squad leader Sergeant Caleb Jones (David Nibley). The three travel through the French countryside as quickly as possible to avoid being pursued. They encounter Neumann and kill his troops, but spare him.

The three soldiers continue making their way to Les Arcs and agree to help French Resistance prisoners escape. They free the resistance prisoners: Philippe, Gustave and Jacques. The group arrives at Les Arcs, and Jones spots a German Panzer III and a Sd.Kfz. 251 half-track full of German infantry enroute to attack the rest of the paratroopers. The three attempt to ambush the Germans, but are badly wounded. After Curtis's death, Rossi regains consciousness and is approached by Neumann, whom Jones spared earlier. Rossi gets up to fight but collapses due to his wounds. Neumann, also wounded, does not kill him, showing him the same mercy that Jones' showed him.

He takes Rossi to an abandoned farm, where he bandages his wounds and makes him a meal. The following morning, an American detachment discovers Rossi, alive, and Neumann, who has died from his wound. In a military field hospital Rossi is informed that sergeant Jones is alive but wounded and Curtis is dead. The dead Neumann remains in the abandoned farm.

== Cast ==
- Corbin Allred as Corporal James Rossi
- David Nibley as Sergeant Caleb Jones
- Jasen Wade as Corporal Harland "Bud" Curtis
- Lincoln Hoppe as Captain Erich Neumann
- Nichelle Aiden as Charlotte
- Virginie Fourtina Anderson as Emilie
- Loïc Anthian as Phillipe
- Lance Otto as Jacques
- Erich Cannon as Gustave
- Curt Doussett as Lt. Woodward
- Calvin Harrison as Pvt. Stewart

== Production ==
The director of Saints and Soldiers, Ryan Little, struggled with his producer, Adam Abel, to create a sequel to the film, because nearly all of his main characters died in the first film. However, due to the popularity of the first film, they decided to do a sequel. The film was originally titled "Foxhole". The film was based on the events surrounding the 517th Parachute Infantry Regiment, part of Operation Dragoon, which occurred two months after D-Day. Specifically, it was inspired by the true stories from L. Vaughn Curtis's book Letters Home: A Paratrooper's Story, based on the experience and letters of Curtis's father Harland "Bud" Curtis. They also adapted it from Little's short film The Last Good War, for which Little won a Student Emmy award. Corbin Allred was also cast in this film, but as a different character from the original. The film was shot in Utah on a tight budget and used volunteer World War II reenactors as many of the actors and extras.

== Release and reception ==
Saints and Soldiers: Airborne Creed, was released on August 17, 2012. The film received mixed reviews. The Evening Standard 's review described the film as "watchable but hardly memorable", while The Guardian's critic Peter Bradshaw wrote the film was "well-acted" and "competently put together" but with "plenty of cliches", describing it as "a kind of diet or lite version of Steven Spielberg's Saving Private Ryan." Deseret News stated that Airborne Creed is "less believable" than its predecessor. For example, scenes appear "staged" and "quickly thrown together". However, they praised the acting. KSL news stated that the film falls short of the original but is still, "packed with emotion and solid performances" and "beautiful cinematography".

== Sequel ==
Airborne Creed was followed by a standalone sequel in 2014, with Saints and Soldiers: The Void.

== See also ==
- Cinema of the United States
- List of American films of 2012
- List of World War II films
