= Ryan Little =

Canadian film director, cinematographer, and producer

- Born: 28 March 1971 (age 55); Vancouver, British Columbia, Canada
- Occupations: Film director, producer, cinematographer
- Years active: 1999–present
- Spouse: L Little
- Children: 2

Ryan Little (born 28 March 1971) is a Canadian film director, cinematographer and producer. He is perhaps best known for his 2003 film Saints and Soldiers. His work has a broad range of genres. Little was born in Vancouver, British Columbia, Canada. He has produced over a dozen films and directed 13.

== Early life ==
Born in Vancouver, Little always had an aspiration for making film. Growing up, his father made 8 mm films and was always eager to show them off to him. With this, a passion for film began and Little knew that when he grew up he wanted to make films.

== Professional career ==
Little’s first film Saints and Soldiers was inspired by Saints at War, written by Dennis Wright. Little was able to contact the veterans that Wright told him about and with their help, he wrote the story of Saints and Soldiers with screen writer Matt Whitaker. The film, which takes place during World War II, is about three soldiers who escape during the Malmedy massacre.

Some of Little's other work includes the ABC Family Channel romantic comedy Love Surreal, Forever Strong (a film about the Highland Rugby Team), Age of the Dragons, and the TNT pilot Blank Slate.

Little's Saints and Soldiers was entered into seventeen film festivals and won several awards.

Little is one of three executive producers of the tv production extinct along with Orson Scott Card and Aaron Johnston. He is also the director of photography.

== Personal life ==
Little is married and has two sons.

== Awards and nominations ==
Year	Film	Award	Result	Category
1999	The Last Good War	Academy of Television Arts & Sciences Foundation	Won	Best Student Dramatic Film
1999	The Last Good War	Heartland Film Festival	Won	Jimmy Stewart Crystal Heart Memorial Award
2003	Saints and Soldiers	Heartland Film Festival	Won	Crystal Heart Award (shared with Adam Abel)
2003	Saints and Soldiers	Temecula Valley International Film Festival	Won	Viewer's Choice Award for Best Feature Film
2003	Saints and Soldiers	Big Bear Lake International Film Festival	Won	Audience Award for Best Feature Film
2005	Saints and Soldiers	Independent Spirit Award	Nominated	Best Cinematography
2005	Saints and Soldiers	Independent Spirit Award	Nominated	Best First Feature (shared with Adam Abel)
2006	Outlaw Trail: The Treasure of Butch Cassidy	Heartland Film Festival	Won	Crystal Heart Award for independent filmmakers
2015	War Pigs	GI Film Festival	Won	Best Action Feature (shared with producers Steven Luke and Andre Relis)

== Filmography ==
=== Directing ===
- The Last Good War (1999)
- Saints and Soldiers (2003)
- Love Surreal (2005) (TV)
- Outlaw Trail: The Treasure of Butch Cassidy (2006)
- House of Fears (2007)
- Forever Strong (2008)
- Age of the Dragons (2011)
- Saints and Soldiers: Airborne Creed (2012)
- Saints and Soldiers: The Void (2014)
- War Pigs (2015)
- Extinct (2017)
- A Fiancé for Christmas (2021)
- The Third Degree (2024)

=== Producing ===
- The Last Good War (1999) (producer)
- Saints and Soldiers (2003) (producer)
- Outlaw Trail: The Treasure of Butch Cassidy (2006) (producer)
- House of Fears (2007) (executive producer)
- Forever Strong (2008) (producer)
- Saints and Soldiers: Airborne Creed (2012)
- Saints and Soldiers: The Void (2014)
- Candy Coated Christmas (2021) Producer

=== Cinematography ===
- Saints and Soldiers (2003)
- Blank Slate (2008) (TV)
- Saints and Soldiers: Airborne Creed (2012)
- Saints and Soldiers: The Void (2014)
- We Love you, Sally Carmicheal (2017)
- Extinct (2017)
- A Fiancé for Christmas (2021)
- One Big Happy Family (2023)
- Faith of Angels (2024)
- The Third Degree (2024)
