= Alex Veadov =

American actor

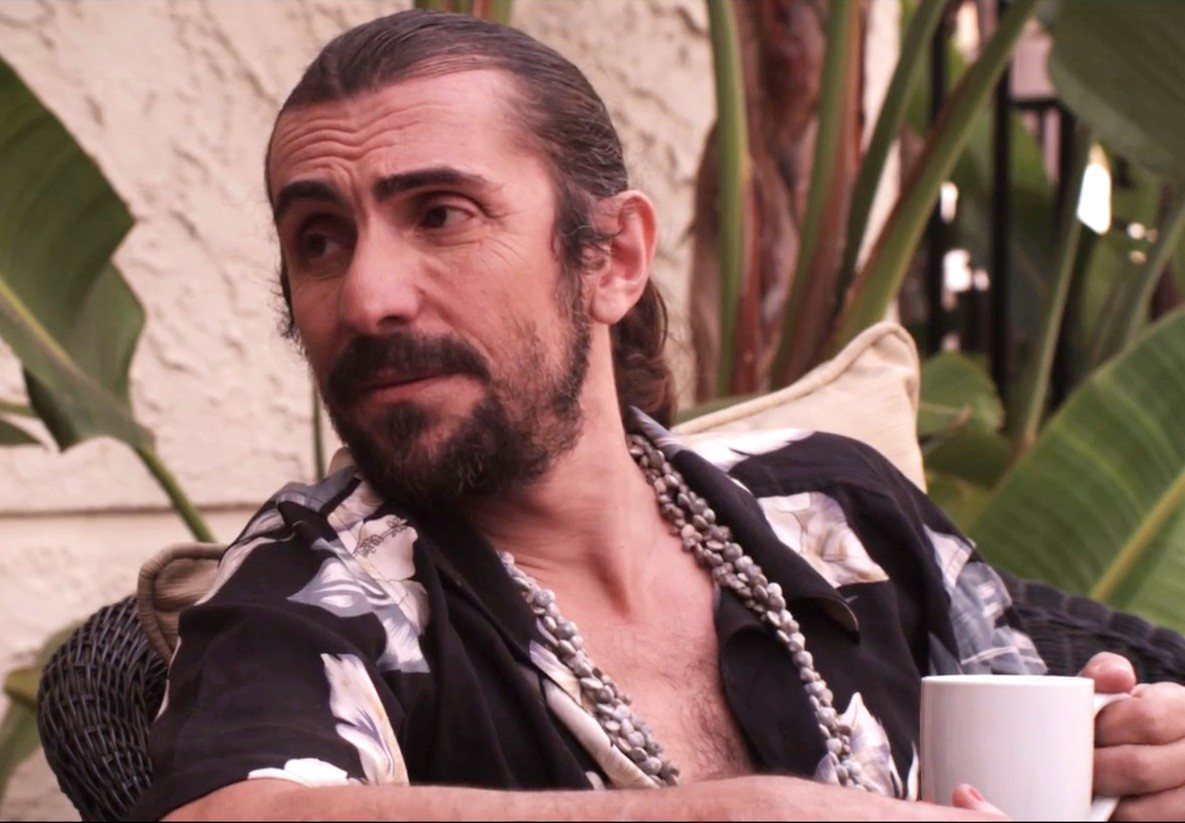
- Veadov in Life's an Itch, 2012
- Occupation: Actor
- Years active: 1989–present

Alex Veadov is an American film and television actor of Ukrainian-Jewish ancestry.

== Career ==
Alex Veadov is a character actor who has acted in many English-language productions. His early career included appearances in Jackie Chan's First Strike, Contact, and Air Force One. He also works as a voice actor.

Veadov is known for playing Russian mob drug lord and hitman Vadim Nezhinski in the film We Own the Night.

Veadov also played the role of Christo, a drug smuggler and terrorist seeking to attack the United States, in the 2012 movie Act of Valor.

In 2014, Veadov played the role of Tevi in The Equalizer. In 2015, he portrayed Nikola in the television series Agent Carter.

== Filmography ==
=== Film ===
Year	Title	Role	Notes
1989	Terminal Force	Hold-Up Man	
1995	Guide to Golf Style and Etiquette	Pizza Man	
1996	First Strike	Russian Group #6	
1996	Justine: Seduction of Innocence	Kuleshov	
1996	Justine: in the Heat of Passion	Kuleshov	
1997	Contact	Russian Cosmonaut	
1997	Air Force One	MiG Pilot	
1997	Justine: A Midsummer Night's Dream	Kuleshov	
1998	Falling Sky	Taxi Cab Driver	
2000	Thirteen Days	Radio Room Operator #3	
2001	The Hollywood Sign	Cabbie	Uncredited
2005	Neighborhood Watch	BMW Driver	
2007	We Own the Night	Vadim Nezhinski	
2008	Marco Polo	1300s Marco Polo	
2009	Eugene	Victor	
2009	Drag Me to Hell	Man with Ponytail at Death Feast	
2009	The Harsh Life of Veronica Lambert	Russian Alex	
2010	Open Season 3	Additional voices	
2011	Knockdown	Vadim	
2012	Act of Valor	Christo	
2012	Lost Angeles	James	
2012	Not Fade Away	Blind Pim	
2012	Life's an Itch	Jean Michele	
2013	The Saratov Approach	Sergei	
2013	Delirium	Sasha Pavlovich	
2013	Cavemen	Cabbie	
2014	The Equalizer	Tevi	
2018	Alterscape	Dr. Kaine Egres	
2019	Crossing	Gregory	
TBA	Superstrata	Nomad	

=== Television ===
Year	Title	Role	Notes
1995	General Hospital	Workman No.2	Episode dated 5 January 1995
1995	Tom Clancy's Op Center	Ukrainian Sergeant	Miniseries; television film
1998	Seven Days	Valensky	Episode: "Pilot: Part 1"
2000	The Wild Thornberrys	Yuri	Episode: "A Tiger by the Tail"
2000	Cover Me	Novatny	Episode: "Domestic Terrorism"
2000	God, the Devil and Bob	Voice	2 episodes
2000	JAG	Jail Sergeant	Episode: "Legacy: Part 2"
2001	The Weber Show	Sergei	Episode: "...And Then He Got a Rash"
2001, 2005	Alias	The Chemist / K-Directorate Officer	2 episodes
2002	The Agency	Russian Agent	Episode: "The Gauntlet"
2002	The Shield	Igal	Episode: "Circles"
2002	Without a Trace	Goran Davits	Episode: "Between the Cracks"
2002	Astronauts	Vladimir Tyurzin	Television film
2005	NYPD Blue	Sergei Yesenin	2 episodes
2006	Science of the Bible	Simon Magus	Episode: "Rivals of Jesus"
2007	Everybody Hates Chris	Referee	Episode: "Everybody Hates Bed-Stuy"
2008	Terminator: The Sarah Connor Chronicles	Russian Man	Episode: "The Demon Hand"
2008	Greek	Professor Hebert	Episode: "No Campus for Old Rules"
2008	The Closer	Hovnan 'Hank' Serabian	Episode: "Dial M for Provenza"
2010–2011	Svetlana	Vlad	20 episodes
2014	Chop Shop	Ray	3 episodes
2014, 2015	NCIS	Sergei Mishnev	3 episodes
2015	Agent Carter	Nikola	Episode: "The Iron Ceiling"
2015	Lust 'n' Love	Anton	2 episodes
2018	The Americans	TASS Boss	Episode: "Urban Transport Planning"
2020	MacGyver	Felix	Episode: "Right + Wrong + Both + Neither"

=== Video games ===
Year	Title	Role	Notes
1996	Soviet Strike	Ivan Uralia	
1998	Counter Measures	Lt. Daninski	
2000	Soldier of Fortune	Voice	
2002	Stranded	Yuri	
2002	Soldier of Fortune II: Double Helix	Additional voices	
2003	Medal of Honor: Allied Assault	Voice	
2003	Freedom Fighters	Voice	
2003	SOCOM II U.S. Navy SEALs	Additional Russia VO	
2004	Syphon Filter: The Omega Strain	Vladimir Zhidkov / Thug A / Soldier B	
2004	Shadow Ops: Red Mercury	Voice	
2004	Joint Operations: Typhoon Rising	Spetsnaz Soldier	
2004	Call of Duty: Finest Hour	Voice	
2004	Joint Operations: Escalation	Spetsnaz Soldier	
2005	Conflict: Global Storm	Voice	
2007	Tom Clancy's Ghost Recon Advanced Warfighter 2	Voice	
2007	Syphon Filter: Logan's Shadow	Kudrenko	
2009	World in Conflict: Soviet Assault	Voice	
2009	Call of Duty: Modern Warfare 2	Additional voice talent	
2009	Rogue Warrior	Russian 2	
2010	Metro 2033	Voice	
2010	Singularity	Additional voices	
2010	Call of Duty: Black Ops	Additional voices	
2013	Metro: Last Light	Voice	
