= Peter Holden =

American actor

- Occupations: Actor, producer
- Years active: 1990–present
- Spouse: Sandi Milne Holden (m. 1994)

Peter Holden is an American actor and producer of film and television.

== Filmography ==
=== Film ===
- Options (1989, as Buck)
- In Too Deep (1990, as Police Officer)
- Dangerous Pursuit (1990, as Counterman)
- Fatal Exposure (1991, as Hank)
- Child of Darkness, Child of Light (1991, as Michael's gang)
- Daisy de melker (1993, as Dr. Ferguson)
- Woman of Desire (1994, as Michael Altman)
- Cheap Philosophy (1995, as Philosopher) (short)
- Ladies Room L.A. (2000)
- The Theory of Everything (2000, as Russell)
- XCU: Extreme Close Up (2001)
- No Turning Back (2001, as Recruiter)
- The Victim (2001)
- Reality School (2002, as Student)
- Out of Step (2002, as Mr. Rigg)
- Safe Journey (2002)
- Black Hole (2002, as Diego)
- Saints and Soldiers (2003, as Sgt. Gordon Gunderson)
- Next Exit (2005, as William)
- Taphephobia (2006, as Stirling)
- On a Tuesday (2007, as Mr. Brown)
- The Beneficiary (2008, as Andrew Williams)
- Pandemic (2009, as Spenser)
- The Social Network (2010, as Facebook Lawyer)
- The Dark Knight Rises (2012, as Applied Sciences Tech)
- Under the Bed (2012, as Terry Hausman)
- A Golden Christmas 3 (2012, as Nick)
- Lovelace (2013, as Alex - Medical Salesman)
- Abashed (2013, as David)
- Foreign Land (2013, as Father Roberts)
- Alien Abduction (2014, as Peter Morris)
- The Incident(s) at Paradise Bay (2013, as David Kay)
- Drowning (2014, as Dr. Trent Gregor)
- Perception (2014, as Bob Stenson)
- Encounter (2018, as Agent Banks)

=== Television ===
- The Wonder Years (1993, 2 episodes, as Nick Sadowski)
- Living in Captivity (1998, 1 episode)
- The Pretender (1999, 1 episode, as Radio Station Manager)
- Frasier (1999, 1 episode, as Steven)
- Charmed (2000, 1 episode, as Worker #2)
- Philly; (2002, 1 episode, as Attendant)
- CSI: Crime Scene Investigation (2002, 1 episode, as Augie Heitz)
- Miss Match (2003, 1 episode, as Tony Barre)
- 10-8: Officers on Duty (2004, 1 episode, as Father)
- NYPD Blue (2004, 1 episode, as Eric Dooling)
- The District (2004, 1 episode, as Robert)
- 24 (2006, 3 episodes, as Harry Swinton)
- Scrubs (2008, 1 episode, as Mr. Macrae)
- Cold Case (2008, 1 episode, as Harold '05)
- Brainstorm (2009, 8 episodes, as Don Yolk)
- Bones (2010, 1 episode, as Jesse Byrd)
- Ghost Whisperer (2010, 1 episode, as Darren)
- NCIS (2010, 1 episode, as Vector Control Worker)
- Criminal Minds: Suspect Behavior (2011, 1 episode, as CPS Supervisor)
- Desperate Housewives (2011, 1 episode, as Park Ranger)
- It's Always Sunny in Philadelphia (2012, 1 episode, as Union Delegate)
- Scandal (2013, 1 episode, as William Granville)
- Castle (2013, 1 episode, as Ken Caster)
