= Larry Gelwix =

American rugby union coach (born 1950)

- Born: July 25, 1950 (age 76); Oakland, California
- Other name: Getaway Guru
- Occupations: Teacher, Travel Agent, Radio Host
- Known for: Rugby Coach

Larry Gelwix (born July 25, 1950 in Oakland, California) has been the coach of the Highland Rugby team since its founding in Salt Lake City in 1976. The movie Forever Strong (2008) was inspired by him and his team's history. The Highland rugby team has compiled an unrivaled winning record since its founding in 1976. He also hosts a weekend travel show, heard on KNRS and KNRS-FM in Salt Lake City and syndicated to other radio stations.

== Team win/loss record ==
Highland Rugby's 35-year varsity record (1976–2012) is 419 wins and 10 losses, including 20 USA Rugby national championships in the 26 years USA Rugby has sponsored a national championship. In 1998, Highland represented the United States at the World Schools Rugby Championship in Zimbabwe, Africa, which brought together the individual country high school national champions and top teams from around the world. Highland represented the USA. Highland came home with a bronze medal and a third place world finish.

== Coaching principles ==
Gelwix is known to be very demanding on the athletes, requiring all players to adhere to a non-negotiable honor code that includes, among other things, avoiding alcohol, tobacco and drugs. Gelwix formulated what he called the "5 Championship Strategies for Sustainable Success." These success principles focus on Horizontal Leadership; staying away from things you know are wrong; attitude and effort, W.I.N. – What's Important Now – which encourages his players to make decisions now that support what they want in the future, or "tomorrow"; and to focus on the final score of life. Gelwix encourages his players to be true to the beliefs of their own individual faith.

== Personal story ==
Gelwix is a native of California. He was born in Oakland, CA to Betty Jo Mercer and Kennth Gelwix, Jr. and raised in Lafayette, California in the San Francisco Bay Area. He is the second of four children. Gelwix graduated from Del Valle High School in Walnut Creek, CA. After attending one year at BYU, he was a missionary for the Church of Jesus Christ of Latter-day Saints (LDS Church) in the Central States Mission. He earned a BA and MA from Brigham Young University (BYU) in Organizational Communication. He also played rugby for three years at BYU under coaches from New Zealand. He became an instructor at an LDS Church seminary adjacent to Highland High School to earn money to pursue a doctorate at Purdue University. He became an assistant football coach during the fall season and a wrestling coach in the winter. He missed coaching in the spring, and having played rugby at BYU, decided to start a rugby team at the high school.

Gelwix left teaching seminary full-time after four years and pursued a career in the travel industry. Through a series of mergers and acquisitions, Gelwix became a co-owner of Morris Travel, which operated travel agencies throughout the western United States. Gelwix and his partners sold Morris Travel in 1995, at which time Morris had 50+ offices and over 400 employees. Following the sale of Morris Travel, Gelwix was hired as CEO of WinAir Airlines, a charter airline operating nine 737 aircraft. In 2000, Gelwix and former business partner, Mark Faldmo, formed Columbus Travel, headquartered in Bountiful, Utah. Columbus Travel has become one of the largest and most successful travel agencies in Utah and won the "Best of State" award three times as the "best travel agency in the state of Utah" and was named by Mark Travel Corporation (one of the largest tour operators in the world) as one of the "Top 10 Travel Agencies" in the country. Columbus has been awarded numerous other honors, distinctions, and citations in the travel industry.

Gelwix is best known in the Rocky Mountain area as the "Getaway Guru" and host of the syndicated "Travel Show" radio broadcast. Gelwix has been an on-air radio talk show host for more than 20 years (12 years at KSL and 8 years syndicated by Clear Channel Communications). Gelwix is also the feature on the "Getaway Guru" segment broadcast weekly on KUTV channel 2, the CBS network affiliate in UT, ID, and western WY. Gelwix is CEO of Columbus Travel.

Gelwix has received many awards, honors, and distinctions, including the "Best of State" award as the best high school coach in the state of Utah, the "Education Service Award" from the State of Utah Department of Corrections; and the BYU "Outstanding Service" Award.

The movie Forever Strong was based on Coach Gelwix and the Highland Rugby Team.

Though retired from active coaching, Gelwix continues his "coaching" by the letters and daily inspirational quotes that he sends to former players and many others

== Personal quotes ==
Gelwix is known for his quotes, known as Gelwixisms. Among them are:

- "You have two years to serve the Lord, and the rest of your life to think about it."
- "Good decisions don't make life easy, but they do make it easier."
- "The true test of a man is what he will do when no one will know."
- "The essence of a lie is not the words you choose, but the message you convey."
- "If you lose your integrity, you've lost everything."
- "I want you to be forever strong on the field, so that you will be forever strong off the field."
- "I don't build championship teams, I build championship boys."
- "Practice doesn't make perfect, practice makes permanent."

== Legacy ==
Bob Nilsen, who played Highland rugby under Gelwix, was formerly president of Burger King and is now co-owner of Cafe Rio restaurants. He was asked at a business meeting in Hong Kong what teacher had most affected his life. He named Gelwix. Another player, Matthew Cole, became president of Bluestreak Sports Training in Stamford, Connecticut. While playing for Highland from 1996 to 2000, he says Gelwix was his father figure after his parents' divorce. Professional pianist and composer Jon Schmidt says Gelwix is "unusual in his ability to be an influence and be an example."

== Church service ==
Gelwix was interviewed by Henry B. Eyring, First Counselor in the First Presidency, on December 1, 2010 and was called the same day to work as a mission president for the LDS Church. He received his call to the California Fresno Mission in February 2011 and began as its president on July 1, 2011. He and his wife, Cathy, completed their service in June, 2014. They returned to their home near Salt Lake City thereafter, whereupon Gelwix resumed as CEO of Columbus Travel and began once again hosting his syndicated radio and television segments.
