= The Church of Jesus Christ of Latter-day Saints in Russia =

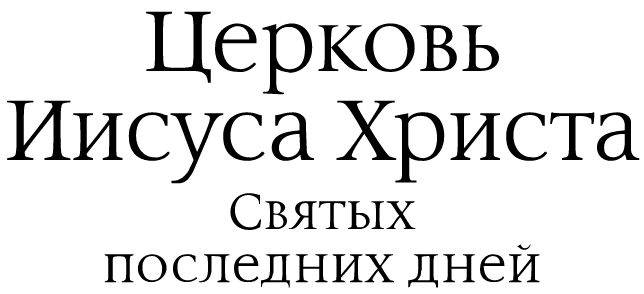
- (Logo in Russian)

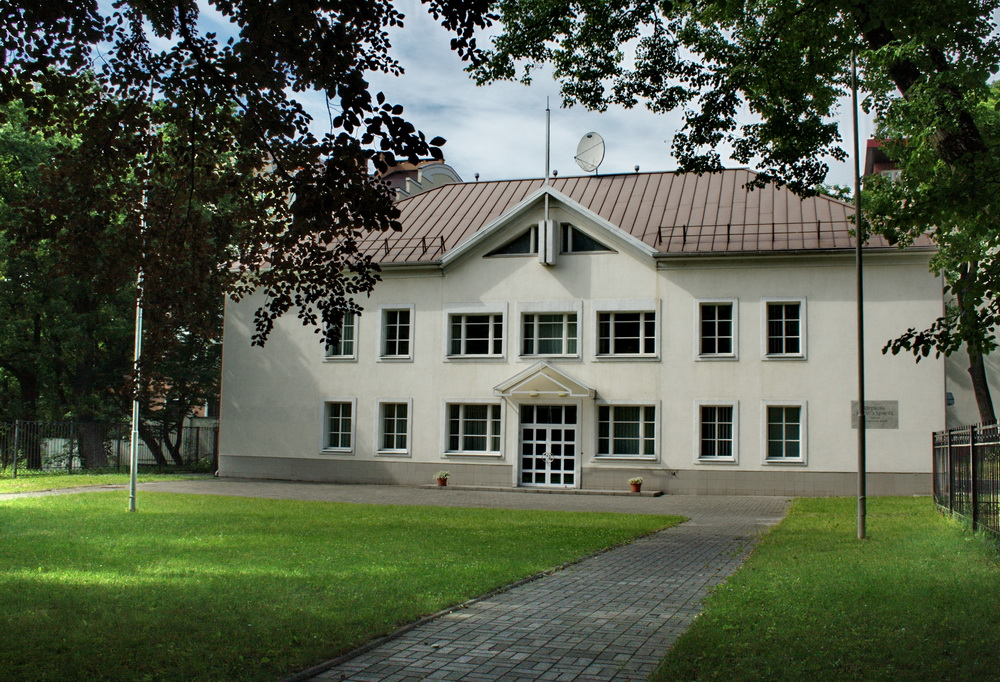
- A meetinghouse in Kaliningrad
- Area: Eurasian
- Members: 18,306 (2025)
- Stakes: 2
- Districts: 4
- Wards: 11
- Branches: 40
- Total congregations: 51
- Missions: 3
- Temples: 1 announced

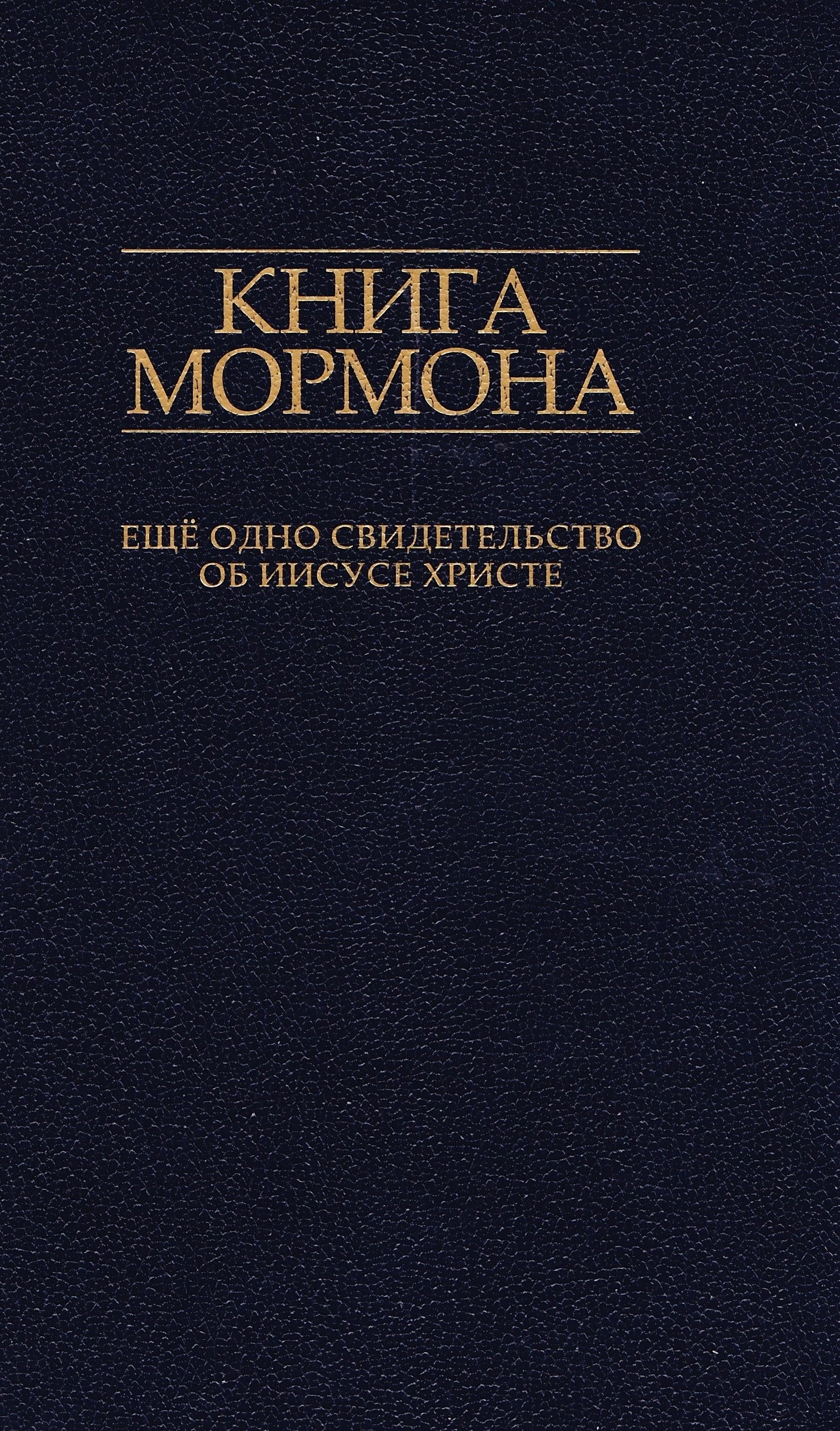
The Russian translation of the Book of Mormon

The Church of Jesus Christ of Latter-day Saints (LDS Church) had a presence in Russia before the rise of the USSR, with the first baptisms occurring in 1895. Preliminary missionary efforts began before the dissolution of the Soviet Union, and the Russian government officially recognized the church in 1991. Membership increased in the 1990s and early 2000s. Missionary efforts were impacted by the 2016 Yarovaya law, which prohibited proselytizing outside of official church property. In 2018, Russell M. Nelson announced that a temple would be constructed in a major city in Russia.

== History ==
Membership In Russia
Year	Membership
1992	750
1999	11,092
2004	17,284
2009	19,946
2016	23,180
2024	18,132
2025	18,306
Source: Jim M. Wall, Deseret News, various years, Church Almanac Country Information: Russia, Windall J. Ashton

=== Early beginnings ===
In 1843, 13 years after the church was formed, Joseph Smith called two missionaries—George J. Adams and Orson Hyde—to preach in Russia. Smith stated that "some of the most important things concerning the ... building up of the kingdom of God in the last days" involved Russia. Adams and Hyde's mission, however, was canceled after the death of Joseph Smith. In the 1840s, the Russian press reported the Mormon pioneers' move west, and in the 1870s and 80s chronicled the struggle between the church and the U.S. government over the practice of plural marriage. In 1887, while serving in Jaffa, Palestine, Joseph M. Tanner reportedly baptized some Russians who then settled in Utah. The first Latter-day Saint baptisms in Russia occurred in 1895. August Höglund, a Swedish native, was sent to St. Petersburg in response to a request from the Lindelof family for missionaries to visit them. Johan and Alma Lindelof were soon baptized, and two of their children followed in 1905. This event encouraged Francis M. Lyman to travel to Russia in 1903 to dedicate it for missionary work. He gave dedicatory prayers in Moscow and at the Summer Palace in St. Petersburg. Church leaders visited the Lindelofs following their conversion. An LDS missionary was sent to Latvia, but increasing political tension thwarted further efforts to proselyte in the Russian Empire. After the October Revolution occurred, the Lindelof family was arrested and only two children were confirmed to have survived.

=== Soviet era ===
There is no evidence of additional converts to the church before 1989; however, John H. Noble claimed to have met a "handful of Mormons" while in the Soviet Union in the 1950s. He recorded that they were persecuted by the Communist government for their association with an American religion, but persisted in practicing their faith. The term "Mormon" was also used by Russians to describe unaffiliated polygamist groups.

In 1959, Ezra Taft Benson visited Moscow and spoke to a crowd in the Central Baptist Church. The Russian-language translation of the Book of Mormon was published on June 3, 1981. As the political climate began to change, the Russian people began learning of the church through travel to other countries and contact with members. In 1987, a Finland Mission president had been blessed to begin work in the Baltic states and Russia, that is, during the late Soviet era. The Terebenin family joined the church while visiting Budapest, Hungary, in 1989, and it was in their home on February 11, 1990, where the first Russian branch of the LDS Church was created. Soviet diplomat Yuri Dubinin traveled to Utah in April 1990; while visiting Brigham Young University, he affirmed that the church would be allowed inside the USSR. Russell M. Nelson dedicated the land for missionary work for the second time in 1990, in the same Summer Garden where Lyman gave the original prayer. They resumed missionary work in Estonia in October–November 1989, and in 1990, from Estonia it went to Russia. The first mission in the Soviet Union was established in July 1990.

=== Religious Freedom, Growth and Expansion ===
The church was officially recognized by the Russian government in May 1991. The Russia Moscow and St. Petersburg missions were founded in February 1992 after legislation passed that allowed for greater religious freedom. At the time, church membership had reached 750. In the 1990s and early 2000s, membership grew and three stakes were established in Moscow, St. Petersburg, and Saratov. In March 1998, a pair of missionaries were kidnapped while working in Saratov and held for a ransom of $300,000. The ransom was never paid, and the young men were released four days later.

=== Government Restrictions, 2016 to present ===
Beginning in July 2016, anti-terror laws passed in Russia prohibit most religious proselytizing. The LDS Church announced that it would adhere to the new restrictions outlined in this Yarovaya law, including referring to missionaries as "volunteers". According to a report by the United States Commission on International Religious Freedom, the law prohibits "preaching, praying, disseminating religious materials, and even answering questions about religion outside of officially designated sites." A 2018 Radio Free Europe story detailed the challenges these volunteers face in Russia, including not being able to directly tell people about the church in public places and combating abundant anti-Mormon media. According to The Moscow Times, Roskomnadzor, the part of the Russian government overseeing media censorship, has blocked the church's website. In March 2019, a pair of Latter-day Saint volunteers serving in Novorossiysk were arrested and deported by Russian police for visa violation when they were found teaching English. There are continuing cultural obstacles, particularly due to the overlap that occurs between church culture and American culture. Family History Centers in Russia were closed. The church has built its own chapels in Russia, but tends to purchase and remodel existing buildings in order to draw less negative attention. Despite restrictions, the LDS Church continues to push to create and build relationships with local authorities, serve the community, and strive to abide by the guidelines set by governmental authorities.

Beginning in 2016, missionaries were referred to as volunteers with restricted duties because of government restrictions. Church meetings and services were left under the direction of local members. In 2020, in-person meetings were suspended which resumed starting in September 2021. In 2021, the church in Russia provided various humanitarian services and supplies to organizations in Russia. The LDS Church also participated in various interfaith meetings. By mid-February 2022, all remaining foreign volunteers from missions in Russia were relocated to other missions outside of Russia, due to unrest surrounding Russia's invasion of Ukraine.

== Statistics and other information ==
In 2017, the First Presidency dissolved the Russia Vladivostok Mission into the Novosibirsk Mission, lowering the number of missions in Russia to five. A 2017 Deseret News report claimed 23,180 members and 103 congregations. By 2024, due to increased governmental restrictions, membership declined to 18,132 in 56 congregations with all Family History Centers closed.

=== Stakes and Districts ===
As of May 2025, Russia has two stakes and Four districts:

Stake	Organized	Mission
Moscow Russia Stake	21 February 1993	Russia Moscow Mission
Novosibirsk Russia District	1 December 1997	Russia Novosibirsk Mission
Rostov-na-Donu Russia District	21 June 2015	Russia Moscow Mission
Saint Petersburg Russia Stake	19 September 1993	Russia Moscow Mission
Saratov Russia District	13 August 1996	Russia Moscow Mission
Yekaterinburg Russia District	9 May 1999	Russia Yekaterinburg Mission

Irkutsk, Ulan-Ude, Vladivostok, and Yuzhno-Sakhalinsk branches are no longer part of a district and are administered directly by the Russia Novosibirsk Mission.

The Russia Moscow Stake includes congregations in Belarus. The Yekaterinburg Russia District include congregations in Kazakhstan. The Rostov-na-Donu Russia District includes congregations in Crimea.

=== Missions ===
- Russia Moscow Mission
- Russia Novosibirsk Mission
- Russia Yekaterinburg Mission

=== Temples ===
Russian members attended the Stockholm Sweden Temple and the Freiberg Germany Temple before the Helsinki Finland Temple and the Kyiv Ukraine Temple were constructed. Hostilities between Russia and Ukraine have made travel more difficult for members seeking to attend the Kyiv temple and other surrounding temples. In the Russian Far East, members have also used the temple in Seoul.

At the church's April 2018 general conference, Russell M. Nelson announced a temple to be constructed in Russia. The official location has not been announced, though it will reportedly be in a major city. While visiting Moscow that same month, Dieter F. Uchtdorf encouraged church members to prepare for the temple but to have "patience", as development and construction will be slow. Ronald A. Rasband visited Eastern Europe in 2019 and assured Russian members that a temple would indeed be built.

With the onset of the 2022 Russia Ukraine Conflict, Russian members were cut off from their closest temples due to visa restrictions and sanctions. By 2026, Russia's stakes and districts was reassigned to the Bangkok Thailand Temple.

299. Russia Temple (Announced); Official website; News & images	
Location: Announced:	Russia; 1 April 2018 by Russell M. Nelson

== Eurasian Area ==
Country/Territory	Members	Congregations	FSC
Armenia	3,579	8	4
Belarus	469	1	0
Georgia	498	3	1
Kazakhstan	245	3	1
Russia	18,306	51	0

In 2022, LDS Church area boundaries in Europe were redrawn and Europe East Area was organized with Moscow serving as the Headquarters for that mission. The Area was later renamed Eurasian Area and encompasses the countries of Armenia, Belarus, Georgia, Kazakhstan, Kyrgyzstan, and Russia.

=== Belarus ===
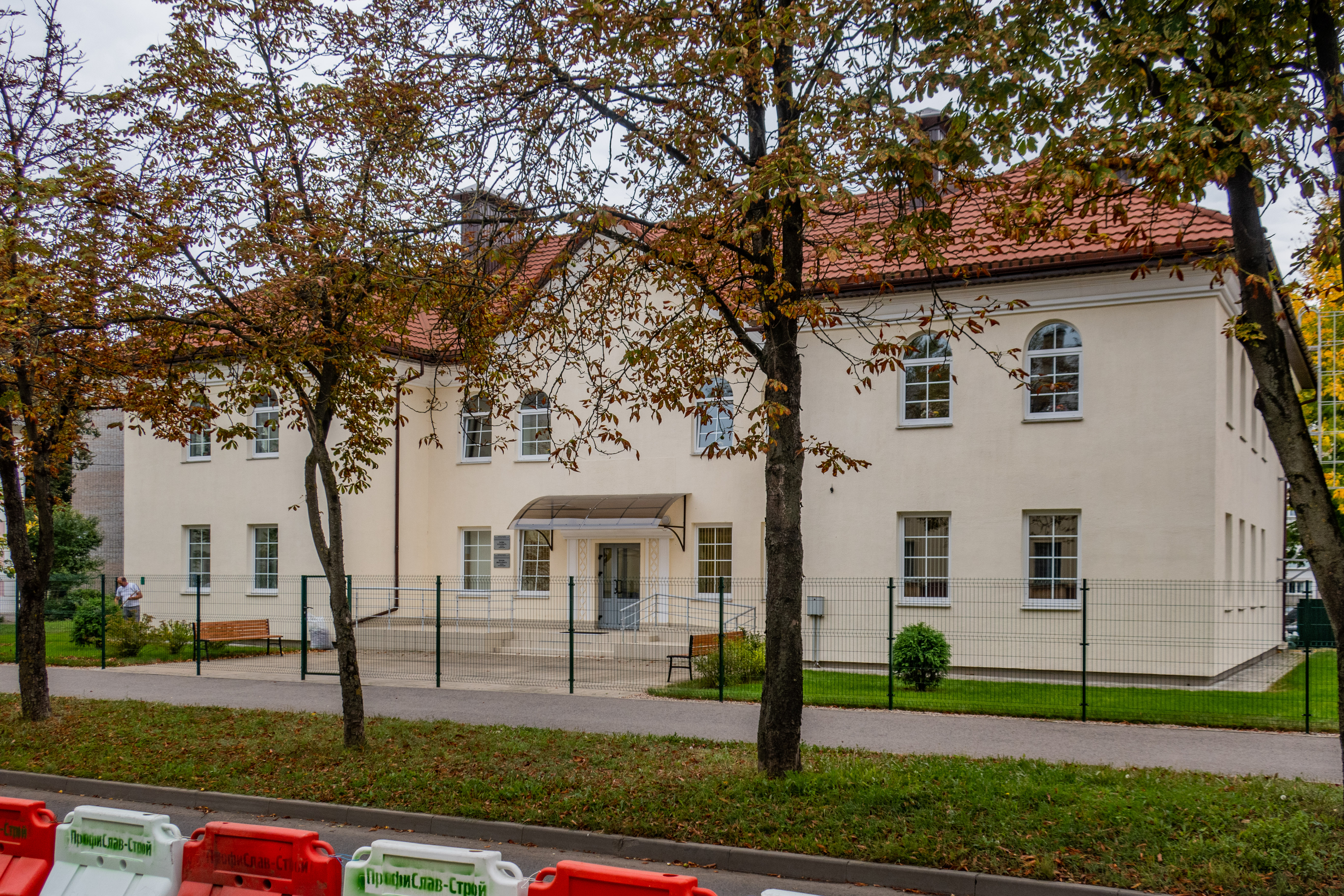
LDS Church meetinghouse in Minsk, Belarus

LDS Church has not reported membership numbers for Belarus since publishing year-end 2018 when it had 511 members in three branches and is administered by the Russia Moscow Mission. After the Russian invasion of Ukraine, the district dissolved and became part of the Moscow Russia Stake. The Minsk Ward is the only congregation left that meets in Belarus.

- Minsk Ward
- Russia Moscow Mission Branch

A meetinghouse is located in Minsk. The Russia Moscow Mission Branch administers to individuals and families not in proximity of that meetinghouse.

=== Kazakhstan ===
In 2000, the LDS Church received official government recognition. Russell M. Nelson visited Kazakhstan in September 2003 and dedicated the country. He visited Astana where he met with government officials in 2017.

Kazakhstan is administered through the Russia Yekaterinburg Mission.

- Almaty Branch
- Astana Branch
- Russia Yekaterinburg Kazakhstan Mission Branch

The Russia Yekaterinburg Kazakhstan Mission Branch administers to individuals and families not in proximity of a meetinghouse.

=== Kyrgyzstan ===
The church is not recognized in Kyrgyzstan but has conducted several humanitarian projects in the country. The LDS Church does not publish membership numbers for the country; estimates place the number to be less than 10. There are no meetinghouses in the country and individuals and members are administered by the Russia Yekaterinburg Kazakhstan Mission Branch.

== See also ==
- Religion in Russia
- Christianity in Russia
