= Highland High School (Utah) =

Coordinates: 40°43′25″N 111°50′37″W

- Highland High School under renovation in 2026
- 2166 South 1700 East; Salt Lake City, Utah 84106; United States

Information
- Established: 1956
- School district: Salt Lake City School District
- Principal: Jeremy Chatterton
- Teaching staff: 85.67 (on an FTE basis)
- Enrollment: 2,009 (2023–2024)
- Student to teacher ratio: 23.45
- Colors: Black, white, and gold
- Team name: Rams
- Rival: East High School
- Website: Official website

Highland High School is a high school in Salt Lake City, in the U.S. state of Utah, that opened in 1956 and has a student body of 1,546. It is located at 2166 South 1700 East, next to Sugar House Park, and is part of the Salt Lake City School District. The current principal is Jeremy Chatterton.

== Salt Lake School for the Performing Arts ==
During the 2006–2007 school year, Highland began hosting a school known as the Salt Lake School for the Performing Arts (SPA). It offers programs in music, digital media, theater, tech, and dance, as well as 3500 to 4000 seat auditorium. However, the balcony seats have been made into science labs and rooms. Enrollment is expected to reach its maximum of 400 within thirteen years. Starting in August 2011, SPA classes were held in a separate building, the former Rosslyn Heights elementary school building, with the students being bussed to Highland for their core classes.

== Rugby team ==
Highland High School is noted for its rugby union team. Under coach Larry Gelwix, who started the team in 1976 and continued coaching until retirement in 2011, they compiled a phenomenal 418–10 record. It won the national high school championship in 20 of the 27 years under his reign (beginning with the championship's creation in 1985) and in that time span never placed lower than third, which it has achieved just once. It is also the only team to have participated in every national rugby championship. In 1998, Highland participated in the first World Schools Rugby Championship held in Harare, Zimbabwe. They were the only team from the Western Hemisphere included and placed 3rd out of 12 teams. Many successful football players have passed through this program, including 5-time Pro Bowl defensive lineman Haloti Ngata.

Following Gelwixes' retirement, the team went on hiatus for one year. In the spring of 2013, Mark Numbers, a Highland High School alumnus and former head coach of the University of Utah men's rugby team, became the team's head coach. Different from its former history, the rugby team at Highland now draws its players only from the Highland student body. As youth rugby in the United States continues to shift from national, club‐based competition to state‐based, single‐school competition, Highland Rugby has adopted the single‐school model.

The movie Forever Strong, filmed locally and released in 2008, was based on the accomplishments of the Highland rugby team.

== Noted alumni ==
- Marv Bateman – former American football punter for the University of Utah (Utah's only two-time First Team All American), Buffalo Bills – NFL All-Pro in 1976, and Dallas Cowboys
- Stewart Bradley – former NFL outside linebacker for the Denver Broncos, Arizona Cardinals, and Philadelphia Eagles
- Peter Breinholt – singer/songwriter
- Mark W. Fuller – President and CEO of WET Design
- Jackson Hawes – NFL tight end for the Buffalo Bills
- Jon M. Huntsman, Jr. – former Governor of Utah and 2012 Republican presidential candidate
- Jason Todd Ipson – writer, producer, director, surgeon; best known for directing the films Unrest and Everybody Wants to be Italian
- Jeff Judkins – former NBA player for Boston Celtics, Portland Trail Blazers, Utah Jazz, and Detroit Pistons; former head coach for women's basketball at BYU
- David LaFlamme (née Gary Posie) - violinist/songwriter, notably with the band It's a Beautiful Day
- Roberto Linck, former player of Major League Soccer and executive producer of the film Buddy.
- Alexander Magleby – US national rugby team former player, captain, head coach; multiple national and Ivy League championships as head coach of Dartmouth Rugby
- Marcus Mailei – former NFL fullback
- Bryan Mone – NFL defensive tackle
- Mario Naves - artist, art critic, journalist. Distinguished alumni from the Art Department, University of Utah. Art critic several publications
- Steven Sharp Nelson – cellist
- Haloti Ngata – former NFL All-Pro defensive tackle
- Nate Orchard – NFL defensive end
- Anika Orrock — Author, Illustrator, Cartoonist and Comedy Writer. Best known for The Incredible Women of the All-American Girls Professional Baseball League and Socks (the 2024 book and 2018 album) by JD McPherson.
- Dave Parkin – former NFL safety
- Morgan Scalley - Head Coach and former player for Utah Utes Football
- Jon Schmidt – New Age pianist and composer
- Logan Tom – Olympic indoor volleyball and professional beach volleyball player
- Terry Tempest Williams – author best known for Refuge: An Unnatural History of Family and Place.
- Fish Smithson - former NFL safety
