= Forever Strong =

- Theatrical release poster
- Directed by: Ryan Little
- Written by: David Pliler
- Produced by: Adam Abel; Ryan Little; Steven A. Lee; Brian Peck; Brad Pelo
- Starring: Sean Faris; Gary Cole; Penn Badgley; Arielle Kebbel; Sean Astin; Yolanda Wood; Neal McDonough; Julie Warner; Olesya Rulin; Larry Bagby
- Cinematography: T.C. Christensen
- Music by: J Bateman, Bart Hendrickson, Pieter Schlosser, Clay Duncan
- Production companies: Picture Rock Entertainment; Go Films
- Distributed by: Crane Movie Company
- Release date: September 26, 2008
- Running time: 112 minutes
- Country: United States
- Language: English
- Box office: $719,556

Forever Strong is a 2008 American sports drama film directed by Ryan Little, written by David Pliler and released on September 26, 2008. The film stars Sean Faris, Gary Cole, Neal McDonough, Sean Astin, Penn Badgley and Arielle Kebbel. The film is about a troubled rugby union player who must play against the team his father coaches at the national championships. Forever Strong is based on a compilation of individual true stories.

== Plot ==
Rick Penning (Sean Faris) is captain of his high school rugby team whose coach Richard Penning (Neal McDonough) is his father, and whose players indulge in drugs and alcohol. After losing the championship to their rivals the Highland Rugby Team, Rick drinks and drives, resulting in a crash that seriously injures his girlfriend, Tammy (Tyler Kain).

He is sentenced to a boys' Juvenile Detention Center in Salt Lake City. The manager of the center, Marcus (Sean Astin) puts him on the Highland rugby team much to his chagrin, coached by Larry Gelwix (Gary Cole). He struggles to adapt to this new team's ways. A friend sends him a rugby ball with drugs hidden in the stitching. He uses the drugs until influenced by something one of his new teammates tells him, he throws the drugs away. He works hard and finds the strength to become a member of the widely admired Highland team. Each day when he arrives at team practice he criticizes the coach for sitting around chatting with different team members and not doing any real coaching. Then it is his turn to sit with the coach and find himself confessing to the drugs hidden in the rugby ball. The coach deals with it and tells him his teammates want him to be a captain. He is influenced by brotherhood and can cope with his homesickness.

Driving home after a celebration meal, the team is helping a mother and two children with a flat tire when a passing car clips one of the boys. Rick now must deal with the death of his first true friend Kurt (Michael J. Pagan). Rick is released and returns to live with his parents. His father wants him to tell about the Highland team's moves and plays but Rick resists and they argue. His father makes it up by lending Rick the keys to his sports car, and Rick drives to meet up with Tammy and his old friends. They too become angry that Rick won't reveal the Highland team's secrets and a fight breaks out. They plant drugs and alcohol in the sports car and Rick is arrested when the police show up. Tammy tells the police what really happened and Rick is released. Rick finds himself again in the national championship, this time against the former friends on his old team coached by his estranged father. The game is hard-fought. Players from his old team try to hurt Rick through cheap shots to collect the bounty on his head. Coach Penning tells Rick if he stays down Rick will end up like him. Rick gets back up and, in the final seconds, scores the winning try for Highland. As the film ends it is shown that in real life, under Coach Gelwix, Highland has been winning almost every year.

== Cast ==
- Gary Cole as Coach Larry Gelwix
- Sean Astin as Marcus Tate
- Neal McDonough as Coach Richard Penning
- Sean Faris as Richard 'Rick' Seymour Penning, Jr.
- Penn Badgley as Lars
- Michael J. Pagan as Kurt Addison
- Nathan West as Quentin 'Q' Owens
- Max Kasch as Griggs
- Julie Warner as Natalie Penning
- Arielle Kebbel as Emily Owens
- Tyler Kain as Tammy
- Larry Bagby as Coach Cal
- Peter Phelps as Referee
- Ryan Roundy as himself

== Production ==
The movie was filmed in Salt Lake City beginning in July 2006 at three local high schools. Sean Faris ran six miles twice a day to get in shape for the film. During filming, Faris sprained his ankle, but had the ankle taped, and continued filming. Several All-American rugby players, predominantly from the University of Utah and Brigham Young University, played in the film. Some Highland Rugby alumni and current players also played roles in the film.

The name of the film is based on a phrase that Gelwix often shares with his team members, "kia kaha" which in the Maori language means Stay strong. The longer version: "Be forever strong on the field, so that you will be forever strong off the field." The players call them "Gelwixism".

Forever Strong is based on an amalgam of true stories about the Highland Rugby high school team. The character Rick Penning is based on a real member of the rugby team who played in Flagstaff, Arizona, and was sent to a group home in Salt Lake City. The story attracted the production company Go Films. "Forever Strong" was the first sports-themed film Go Films had made. Producer Adam Abel and Director Ryan Little were attracted to the story because of Highland Rugby's tradition of winning both on and off the field. The film name "Forever Strong" is taken from the team motto of the Highland High School rugby team.

Forever Strong was released in the fall of 2008 and distributed by Crane Movie Co., a short-lived division of Excel Entertainment Group.

== Soundtrack ==
1. "Ready Or Not" – Manbreak
2. "Pimpin Hard" – B.A.S.K.O.
3. "Nothing Less" – The Travezty
4. "Mele Kalikimaka" – Mugsy
5. "Corporate Logic" – Stereoliza
6. "Don't Make Me Dance" – Joshua Creek
7. "The Deal" – Clay Duncan & Allday
8. "Forever Strong" – Sink To See

== Maori culture ==
Forever Strong contains use of the haka (traditional Maori dance and song) "Ka Mate". The iwi (tribal grouping) Ngāti Toa chief Te Rauparaha is credited with composing this particular haka. The film contains a scene in which one player translates the lyrics of "Ka Mate" for his teammate.

== Critical reception ==
The review aggregator Rotten Tomatoes reported that 30% of critics gave the film positive reviews based on 20 reviews. Metacritic reported the film had an average score of 37 out of 100 based on 9 reviews, indicating "generally unfavorable" reviews. According to CinemaScore, audiences gave the film an average grade of "A-" on an A+ to F scale.

== See also ==
- List of American films of 2008
- Sports film
