= Adam Gregory (actor) =

American actor

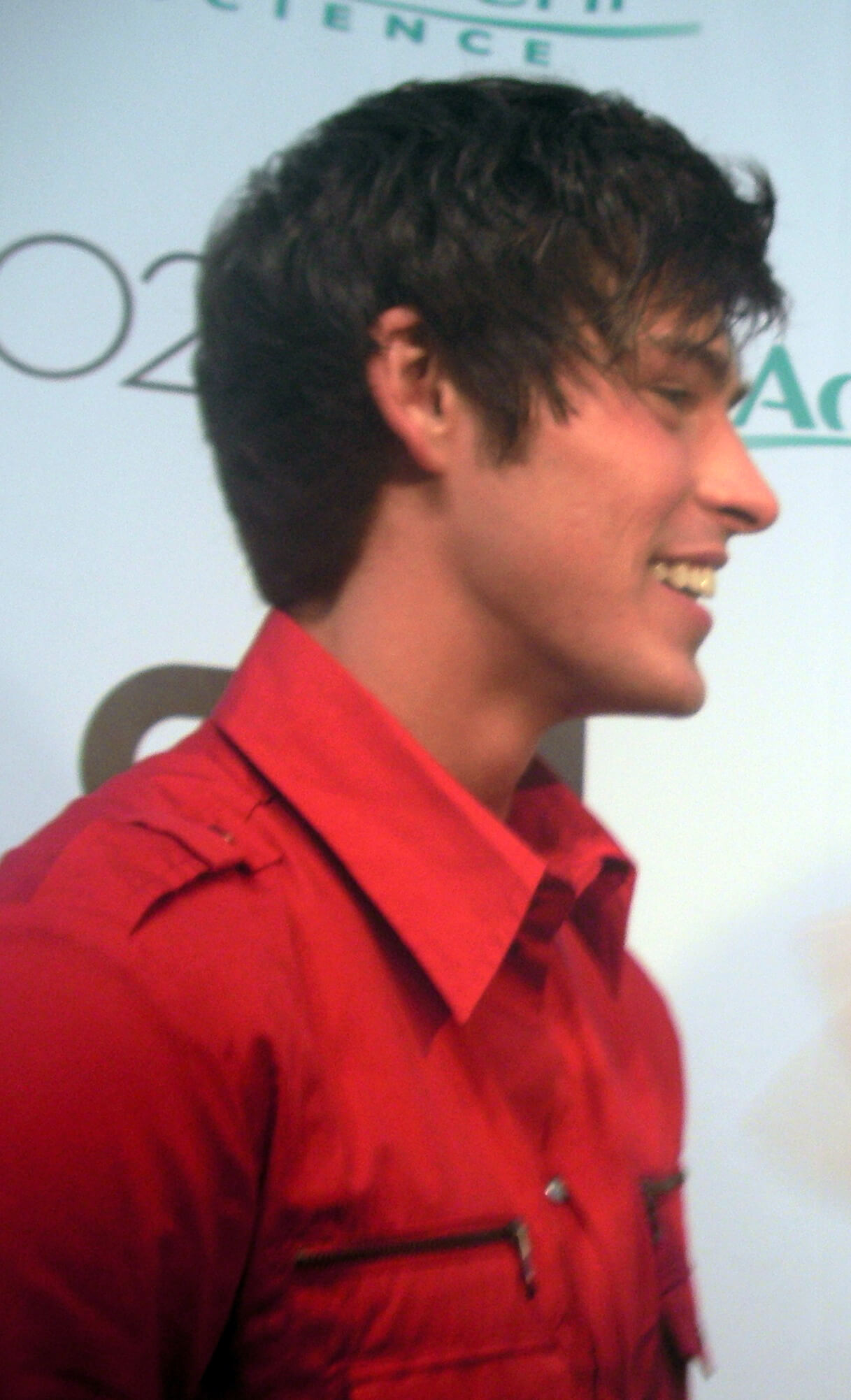
- Gregory at the premiere party for 90210 in August 2008.
- Born: December 28, 1987
- Occupation: Actor
- Years active: 2007–2021
- Spouse: Sheridan Sperry Gregory (m. 2010)
- Children: 2

Adam Gregory (born December 28, 1987) is an American former actor. He is known for playing Thomas Forrester on the CBS soap opera The Bold and the Beautiful and Brandon and Nex on Nickelodeon's Winx Club.

== Life and career ==
Gregory is the youngest of three sons. He graduated from Oak Hills High School in 2006 and was enrolled at Northern Kentucky University, but dropped out to pursue his acting career. He has been married since February 2010, and their first son was born on February 8, 2013. Then on June 16, 2016, the couple welcomed their second son.

He appears as Ashley Tisdale's ex-boyfriend in her music video for "It's Alright, It's OK". Gregory played the role of Ty Collins in The CW's 90210, who takes interest in Shenae Grimes' character during the first season.

In August 2010, he was cast as the new Thomas Forrester on CBS' daytime soap opera The Bold and the Beautiful, taking over the role from Drew Tyler Bell.

In 2014, he played the lead in the film Saints and Soldiers: The Void.

In 2016, he played a reality television star accused of sexual assault on Law & Order: Special Victims Unit in the episode "Assaulting Reality".

== Filmography ==
Film
Year	Title	Role	Notes
2009	17 Again	Dom	
2009	Hannah Montana: The Movie	Drew	
2010	Hard Breakers	Tyler	
2014	Saints and Soldiers: The Void	Corporal Simms	
2017	The Veil	Warrior's Father	
2019	One of the Good Ones	Alex	
2021	A Fiance for Christmas	Landon	

Television
Year	Title	Role	Notes
2008	Just Jordan	Derek	Episode: "Boogie Toasties"
2008	Wizards of Waverly Place	Student	Episode: "The Supernatural"
2008–2009, 2013	90210	Ty Collins	Recurring role, 10 episodes
2010–2014	The Bold and the Beautiful	Thomas Forrester	Main role: September 22, 2010 – September 9, 2013; Recurring role: February 28, 2014
2011–2015	Winx Club	Brandon (voice)	Main role
2016	Law & Order: Special Victims Unit	Ryan Ledder	Episode "Assaulting Reality"

Music video
Year	Title	Artist	Role
2009	"It's Alright, It's OK"	Ashley Tisdale	Tisdale's ex-boyfriend
