= Corbin Allred =

American actor (born 1979)

- Born: Corbin Michael Allred; May 25, 1979 (age 47); Salt Lake City, Utah
- Occupation: Actor
- Years active: 1993–present

Corbin Michael Allred (born May 25, 1979) is an American actor. He starred in the 2003 war drama motion picture Saints and Soldiers and the 1997–1998 television series Teen Angel.

== Career ==
Allred's acting career began when he was 12 years old after attending an open casting call in his home town of Midvale, Utah. He has appeared in multiple productions for Mormon cinema. Allred was a member of the Church of Jesus Christ of Latter-day Saints (LDS Church), and served a mission for the church in Australia. He left the LDS Church in 2024.

In addition to Saints and Soldiers and Teen Angel, Allred played the lead role in Josh Kirby... Time Warrior! and is known for his role in Robin Hood: Men in Tights. He appeared in the 1999 films Diamonds alongside Dan Aykroyd and Kirk Douglas and Anywhere but Here with Natalie Portman and Susan Sarandon. He played a lead role in The Saratov Approach, a 2013 film about the weeklong abduction of two LDS Church missionaries in Russia that occurred in 1998.

In television, Allred has had roles in an episode of CSI: Crime Scene Investigation, an episode of NCIS, and a couple episodes of Sabrina the Teenage Witch.

== Filmography ==
=== Film ===
Year	Title	Role	Notes
1993	Robin Hood: Men in Tights	Young Lad	
1993	Quest of the Delta Knights	Tee	Video
1994	No Dessert, Dad, till You Mow the Lawn	Moonpie	
1995–96	Josh Kirby	Josh Kirby	Video series
1997	Address Unknown	Lance Pirth	
1999	Diamonds	Michael Agensky	
1999	Anywhere but Here	Peter	
1999	Christmas Mission	Tomberline	Video short
2003	Saints and Soldiers	Cpl. Nathan 'Deacon' Greer	
2006	Take a Chance	Elliot Buddles / Gustav	Video
2006	The Work and the Glory III: A House Divided	John Griffith	
2008	Team	Klausy	Short
2009	The Wild Stallion	Morg	
2012	Saints and Soldiers: Airborne Creed	Cpl. James Rossi	
2013	The Saratov Approach	Elder Tuttle	
2015	47 Minutes	Mckowski	Short
2019	Out of Liberty	Porter Rockwell	
2024	Alien Country	Johnny	
2025	Masquerade Mix-Up	Timothy	
2025	Dead Pen Tracks	Ted	Short

=== Television ===
Year	Title	Role	Notes
1995	Saved by the Bell: The New Class	Franklin	Episode: "The Principal's Principles"
1996	My Son Is Innocent	First Kid	TV film
1996	Blue Rodeo	Peter Yearwood	TV film
1997	Social Studies	Chip Wigley	Main role
1997	ABC TGIF	Steve Beauchamp	Episode: "Frightful Halloween Bash"
1997–98	Teen Angel	Steve Beauchamp	Lead role
1998	Touched by an Angel	Greg Banks	Episode: "Last Dance"
1998	Sabrina the Teenage Witch	Justin Thumb	Episodes: "Boy Was My Face Red" and "Good Will Haunting"
2001	CSI: Crime Scene Investigation	Ben Jennings	Episode: "Alter Boys"
2002	Judging Amy	Philip Dunbar	Episode: "The Cook of the Money Pot"
2002	Dharma & Greg	Rick Sanderson	Episode: "Mission: Implausible"
2002	Boston Public	Jason Paul	Episode: "Chapter 42"
2002	State of Grace		Episode dated 19 August 2002
2002	JAG	Petty Off. 2nd Class Pittman	Episode: "Dangerous Game"
2003	Monk	Scott	Episode: "Mr. Monk Goes to Mexico"
2003	Threat Matrix	Pvt. Perry	Episode: "Doctor Germ"
2003	NCIS	Corpsman Milano	Episode: "High Seas"
2003	7th Heaven	Griffith Miller	Episode: "Go Ask Alice"
2004	ER	Doug	Episode: "Get Carter"
2004	The Division	Ron Evans	Episode: "Book of Memories"
2004	CSI: Miami	Paul Abbot	Episode: "Crime Wave"
2008	Bones	Adam Matthews	Episode: "The Wannabe in the Weeds"
2013	Granite Flats	Jasper Lovett	Episodes: "The Wrong Man" and "Something Dangerous"
