= Kung Fu Panda (film) =

2008 DreamWorks Animation film

- Theatrical release poster
- Directed by: John Stevenson; Mark Osborne
- Screenplay by: Jonathan Aibel; Glenn Berger
- Story by: Ethan Reiff; Cyrus Voris
- Produced by: Melissa Cobb
- Starring: Jack Black; Dustin Hoffman; Angelina Jolie; Ian McShane; Seth Rogen; Lucy Liu; David Cross; Randall Duk Kim; James Hong; Dan Fogler; Michael Clarke Duncan; Jackie Chan
- Edited by: Clare Knight
- Music by: Hans Zimmer; John Powell
- Production company: DreamWorks Animation
- Distributed by: Paramount Pictures (Note: In July 2014, the film's distribution rights were purchased by DreamWorks Animation from Paramount Pictures and transferred to 20th Century Fox before reverting to Universal Pictures in 2018 following NBCUniversal's acquisition of DreamWorks Animation in 2016.)
- Release dates: May 15, 2008 (Cannes); June 6, 2008 (United States)
- Running time: 92 minutes
- Country: United States
- Language: English
- Budget: $130 million
- Box office: $632 million

Kung Fu Panda is a 2008 American animated martial arts comedy film directed by John Stevenson and Mark Osborne, and written by Jonathan Aibel and Glenn Berger, from a story by Ethan Reiff and Cyrus Voris. Produced by DreamWorks Animation, it is the first installment in the Kung Fu Panda franchise and stars Jack Black as the titular character, alongside Dustin Hoffman, Angelina Jolie, Ian McShane, Seth Rogen, Lucy Liu, David Cross, Randall Duk Kim, James Hong, Dan Fogler, Michael Clarke Duncan, and Jackie Chan. Set in an ancient China populated by anthropomorphic animals, the film follows Po, a bumbling giant panda and kung fu enthusiast living in the Valley of Peace who is unwittingly named the "Dragon Warrior", a prophesied hero worthy of reading a scroll intended to grant its reader limitless power, when the savage snow leopard Tai Lung is foretold to escape imprisonment and attack the Valley.

The film began development in November 2001, and was initially conceived as a parody of martial arts films. However, director Stevenson decided instead to make an action-comedy wuxia film that incorporated the hero's journey narrative for the lead character. The project was announced in September 2005. As with most DreamWorks Animation films, the score for Kung Fu Panda was composed by Hans Zimmer, on this occasion collaborating with John Powell. Zimmer visited China to absorb the culture, and used the China National Symphony Orchestra as part of the scoring process.

Kung Fu Panda premiered at the 2008 Cannes Film Festival on May 15, 2008, and was theatrically released in the United States on June 6 by Paramount Pictures. It grossed $632 million on a budget of $130 million, making it the third highest grossing film of 2008 and the highest-grossing animated film of the year. It received positive reviews from critics, and was nominated for Best Animated Feature at the Academy Awards, and the Golden Globe Awards. The film's success spawned a franchise including three sequels; the first, Kung Fu Panda 2, was released in 2011.

== Plot ==
In the Valley of Peace province of Ancient China, the red panda named Master Shifu learns from his mentor, the tortoise Master Oogway, that the snow leopard Tai Lung will escape from imprisonment and attempt to acquire the Dragon Scroll, an artifact said to grant limitless power. In response, Shifu sends warning to the guards at Tai Lung's prison to strengthen security and announces a tournament to dub one of his five students, collectively known as the "Furious Five", Tigress, Monkey, Crane, Viper, and Mantis, as the "Dragon Warrior", the prophesied hero worthy of reading the scroll. The announcement reaches Po, a giant panda and kung fu enthusiast who dreams of becoming a kung fu master himself, despite wishes from his goose father Mr. Ping for him to run their noodle restaurant and learn the secret ingredient of his "secret ingredient soup". Eager to see the Five, Po attempts to enter the tournament arena after arriving late and is eventually successful, but unintentionally lands in front of them during the awarding ceremony, where Oogway unexpectedly declares him as the Dragon Warrior.

Shifu believes Oogway's choice to be an accident, leading him and the Five to dismiss and deride Po after a rough first day of training, leaving Po dejected and considering quitting. However, Oogway encourages him to persevere, and Po gradually befriends the Five with his resilience and humor. Tigress reveals to Po that Tai Lung was once Shifu's student and adopted son, having raised him as an infant, and how Tai Lung's betrayal and subsequent rampage was a result of Oogway rejecting him as the Dragon Warrior after sensing malice within him. Tai Lung manages to break out of prison and begins his journey back to the Valley; when Shifu learns this and tells Oogway about it, Oogway makes him promise to believe in Po and names Shifu his successor before ascending to the Spirit Realm. Shifu then informs Po and the Five about Tai Lung's escape, stating Po is the only one who can stop him. Terrified, Po attempts to leave but is confronted by Shifu, who confesses that he does not know how he can turn him into the Dragon Warrior. Meanwhile, the Five depart to attempt to stop Tai Lung themselves, but are unsuccessful when he uses his paralysing nerve-strike technique on them.

Shifu learns that Po can reach his full potential for physical feats when motivated by food, and so trains him in a unique kung fu style. When the wounded Five return, Shifu decides that Po is ready to read the Dragon Scroll, but upon opening it, Po discovers that it is blank. Thinking the scroll is powerless, Shifu sends Po and the Five to evacuate the Valley while he faces Tai Lung alone. A saddened Po reunites with Mr. Ping, who, in an attempt to lift his spirits up, reveals that the secret ingredient soup does not actually have a secret ingredient, stating that belief is what makes things special. Realizing that this is the Dragon Scroll's message, Po rushes back to help Shifu.

Shifu battles Tai Lung and is brutally defeated, then Po arrives with the scroll and engages Tai Lung in combat. Tai Lung manages to obtain the scroll, but is similarly mystified by its contents. Enraged, he nerve-strikes Po, who is unaffected due to his body fat. Remembering his earlier training with Shifu, Po overpowers Tai Lung and vanquishes him with the "Wuxi Finger Hold" technique, which he had taught himself, and is hailed as a hero by the Valley.

== Voice cast ==
From left to right: Master Viper, Master Monkey, Master Mantis (on Monkey's head), Master Shifu, Master Tigress and Master Crane. The Furious Five are homages to the actual Snake, Monkey, Praying Mantis, Tiger and Crane styles of Chinese martial arts.

- Jack Black as Po, an energetic and accident-prone yet heroic panda and die-hard kung-fu fan who eventually becomes The Dragon Warrior
- Dustin Hoffman as Master Shifu, an elderly and strict red panda and kung fu master to the Furious Five and Tai Lung's old master/adoptive father
- Ian McShane as Tai Lung, an arrogant and aggressive snow leopard who was formerly Shifu's adopted son and student
  - Riley Osborne as young Tai Lung
- The Furious Five:
  - Angelina Jolie as Master Tigress, a no-nonsense and tough-as-nails South China tiger and leader of the Furious Five
  - Seth Rogen as Master Mantis, a dry-humored Chinese mantis
  - Lucy Liu as Master Viper, a sweet and good-natured viper
  - David Cross as Master Crane, a pragmatic and sarcastic crane
  - Jackie Chan as Master Monkey, an easy-going golden langur. Chan reprised his role in the film's Chinese dub.
- Randall Duk Kim as Grand Master Oogway, a wise, kind, ancient Galápagos tortoise and Shifu's mentor
- James Hong as Mr. Ping, Po's adoptive father, a happy-go-lucky goose who runs a noodle-restaurant
- Dan Fogler as Zeng, a timid palace goose and Shifu's messenger
- Michael Clarke Duncan as Commander Vachir, a hubristic and boastful rhinoceros who is the warden of Chorh-Gom Prison, where Tai Lung is imprisoned

Additionally, Kyle Gass and JR Reed voice KG Shaw and JR Shaw, respectively, two pigs who come across Po before the Dragon Warrior tournament. Other actors with minor voice roles include Wayne Knight, Laura Kightlinger and Kent Osborne. The film's directors, John Stevenson and Mark Osborne, also have small voice roles.

== Production ==
... we love martial arts movies. I wasn't interested in making fun of them, because I really think martial arts movies can be great films, they can be as good as any genre movie when they're done properly ...

Let's try to make it a real martial arts movie albeit one with a comic character and let's take our action seriously. Let's not give anything up to the big summer movies. Let's really make sure that our kung fu is as cool as any kung fu ever done so that we can take our place in that canon and make sure it's a beautiful movie because great martial arts movies are really beautiful-looking movies and then let's see if we can imbue it with real heart and emotion.

— ~co-director John Stevenson on the comedic approach to the martial arts film.

DreamWorks Animation had previously produced a PlayStation video game with a similar premise, T'ai Fu: Wrath of the Tiger, in 1999 under its defunct video game division, DreamWorks Interactive (later known as Danger Close Games).

In January of 2000, the idea of a Panda focused animated film was suggested by DreamWorks founder and CEO, Jeffrey Katzenberg. By November of 2001 an outline for the film was written by Michael Lachance. Who was a DreamWorks Animation executive. Initially, the idea was to make it a spoof, but co-director John Stevenson was not particularly keen on it and instead chose the direction of a character-based wuxia comedy.

In spring 2004, Eric Whitacre wrote a setting of The Seal Lullaby, the opening poem of The White Seal by Rudyard Kipling, which DreamWorks intended to adapt for an animated feature. A few weeks later, it was decided to abandon the idea and start production on Kung Fu Panda instead. Publicized work on the film began in October 2004. In September 2005, DreamWorks announced the film alongside Jack Black, who was selected to be the main voice star.

In November 2005, DreamWorks announced that Dustin Hoffman, Jackie Chan, Lucy Liu and Ian McShane would join Black in the cast. This is also the second DreamWorks Animation film in which Black and Angelina Jolie have co-starred together (the first being 2004's Shark Tale).

The screenplay for the film was written by Jonathan Aibel and Glenn Berger, who before were writers and producers for various TV series, including The George Carlin Show, Mad TV, and King of the Hill, with a story conceived by Ethan Reiff and Cyrus Voris. Reportedly inspired by Stephen Chow's 2004 martial arts action comedy film, Kung Fu Hustle, the directors wanted to make sure the film had an authentic Chinese and kung fu feel to it. Production designer Raymond Zibach and art director Tang Heng spent years researching Chinese painting, sculpture, architecture and kung fu films to help create the look of the film. Zibach said that some of the biggest influences for him were the more artful martial arts films, such as Hero, House of Flying Daggers and Crouching Tiger, Hidden Dragon. Stevenson's aim for the film, which took four years to make, was to make "the best looking film DreamWorks has ever made".

Animator Joel Crawford served as a storyboard artist for Kung Fu Panda beginning in early 2007, marking his first animation work for a DreamWorks film.

We've had some productions that were stressful, but this one ran very smoothly and DreamWorks is [sic] this production as a template on how they would like future productions to run. We lucked out, and there really was a sense of harmony on the animation. Even the production people. We all seemed like we were on the same page, believing in the film. That doesn't happen very often. I tell animators, you will be working on dumpers for most of your career, but every once in a while you get a gem. Kung Fu Panda was a gem.

— ~Dan Wagner, Head of Character Animation.

The hand-drawn animation sequence at the beginning of the film was made to resemble Chinese shadow puppetry. The opening, which was directed by Jennifer Yuh Nelson and produced by James Baxter, was praised by The New York Times reviewer Manohla Dargis as "striking" and "visually different from most mainstream American animations".

Other reviewers have compared the opening to the evocative style of Genndy Tartakovsky's Cartoon Network series Samurai Jack. The rest of the film is modern computer animation, which uses bright, offbeat colors to evoke the natural landscape of China. The end credit sequence also features hand-drawn characters and still paintings in the background.

The computer animation used throughout the film was more complex than anything DreamWorks had done before. When the head of the production handed the script to VFX Supervisor Markus Manninen, she reportedly laughed and wished him "good luck". "When we started talking", said Manninen, "the movie was still a high concept. But for everyone that looked at it, it screamed complexity. We launched off by saying, how can you make this movie tangible? How can you find smart ways to bring this world to life in a way that makes it a great movie and not feel like the complexity becomes the driver of the story, but the story and the emotion being the driver?" In preparation, the animators took a six-hour kung fu class.

Producer Melissa Cobb said that Po was originally "more of a jerk", but that the character changed after they heard Black. According to Black, he worked mostly "in isolation", although he and Dustin Hoffman did spend a day together, which Cobb said helped with the scene in which their characters face off. Lucy Liu said that the film "was quite different because it was such a long process". Liu said that when she was presented with the project, they already had artwork of her character, as well as a "short computerized video version of what she would look like when she moved".

== Release ==
=== Theatrical ===
The film held its world premiere at the 61st Cannes Film Festival on May 15, 2008, where it received massive and sustained applause at the end of the film's screening. Kung Fu Panda later had national premieres in IMAX in the United States on June 1, 2008, at AMC and Regal Cinemas in Hollywood, California, and in the United Kingdom on June 26, 2008, at Leicester Square in London. To promote the film's Japanese release, a manga based on the story was released in Japan in the September 2008 issue of Kerokero Ace magazine. The illustrations were done by Takafumi Adachi.

=== Home media ===
Kung Fu Panda was released on DVD and Blu-ray on November 9, 2008, and on 3D Blu-ray on December 6, 2011, as a Best Buy exclusive. The DVD double-disc release of Kung Fu Panda also includes the short animated film, Secrets of the Furious Five. The film was released on 4K UHD on March 12, 2024, and included the short film Secrets of the Scroll. Kung Fu Panda was released on Peacock on June 6, 2024.

First-day DVD sales caused the film to debut at second place on the Nielsen VideoScan First Alert sales chart, behind Get Smart (2008). With 7,486,642 DVD units sold in 2008, Kung Fu Panda was the fourth highest-selling film and the highest-selling animated film of 2008, above WALL-E, which sold 7,413,548 units. As of February 2010, 17.4 million home entertainment units were sold worldwide.

== Reception ==
=== Box office ===
The film topped the box office in its opening weekend, grossing $60.2 million for a $14,642 average from 4,114 theaters, and performing much better than analysts had been expecting. It was also the highest-grossing opening for a non-sequel DreamWorks Animation film at the time. In its second weekend, the film retreated 44% to second place behind The Incredible Hulk, grossing $33.6 million, for a $8,127 average, from expanding to 4,136 theaters. It closed October 9, 2008, after 125 days of release, grossing $215 million in the United States and Canada, and $416 million in other territories, for a worldwide total of $632 million. Kung Fu Panda was the highest-grossing non-Shrek film from DreamWorks Animation in the United States and Canada before it was surpassed by How to Train Your Dragon in 2010.

=== Critical response ===
On Rotten Tomatoes 87% of 191 reviewers gave the film a positive review; the average rating is 7.2/10. The website's consensus reads: "Kung Fu Panda has a familiar message, but the pleasing mix of humor, swift martial arts action, and colorful animation makes for winning summer entertainment." On Metacritic, the film has an average score of 74 out of 100, based on 36 reviews, indicating "generally favorable" reviews. Audiences polled by CinemaScore gave the film an average grade of "A−" on a scale of A+ to F.

Richard Corliss of Time magazine gave Kung Fu Panda a positive review, stating the picture "provides a master course in cunning visual art and ultra-satisfying entertainment".

Manohla Dargis of The New York Times said, "At once fuzzy-wuzzy and industrial strength, the tacky-sounding Kung Fu Panda is high concept with a heart," and called the film "consistently diverting" and "visually arresting".

Chris Barsanti of Filmcritic.com commented, "Blazing across the screen with eye-popping, sublime artwork, Kung Fu Panda sets itself apart from the modern domestic animation trend with its sheer beauty ... the film enters instant classic status as some of the most gorgeous animation Hollywood has produced since the golden age of Disney."

Michael Phillips of the Chicago Tribune called the film "one of the few comedies of 2008 in any style or genre that knows what it's doing".

However, Tom Charity of CNN criticized the action for tending "to blur into a whirlwind of slapstick chaos", and considered the character of Po too similar to others played by Black.

Peter Howell of The Toronto Star awarded the film two and a half stars, considering it to have a "lack of story" that "frequently manages to amuse, if not entirely to delight".

Kung Fu Panda was also well received in China. It made nearly 110 million yuan by July 2, 2008, becoming the first animated film to earn more than 100 million yuan in China. The Chinese director Lu Chuan commented, "From a production standpoint, the movie is nearly perfect. Its American creators showed a very sincere attitude about Chinese culture." The film's critical and commercial success in China led to some local introspection about why no film to similar standards had been produced domestically, with commentators attributing the problem variously to lower film budgets in China, too much government oversight, a dearth of national imagination, and an overly reverent attitude to China's history and cultural icons.

=== Accolades ===
Kung Fu Panda was nominated for the Academy Award for Best Animated Feature and the Golden Globe Award for Best Animated Feature Film. Jack Black joked about the film's underdog status at the 81st Academy Awards, saying, "Each year, I do one DreamWorks project, then I take all the money to the Oscars and bet it on Pixar."

By contrast, Kung Fu Panda won ten Annie Awards (including Best Animated Feature) out of sixteen nominations, which sparked controversy, with some accusing DreamWorks head Jeffrey Katzenberg of rigging the vote by buying ASIFA-Hollywood memberships (with voting power) for everyone at DreamWorks Animation.

Accolades received by Kung Fu Panda
Award	Category	Recipient	Result	Ref.
Academy Awards	Best Animated Feature	John Stevenson; Mark Osborne	Nominated	
Annie Awards	Best Animated Effects in an Animated Production	Li-Ming 'Lawrence' Lee	Won	
Annie Awards	Best Animated Feature		Won	
Annie Awards	Best Character Animation in a Feature Production	James Baxter	Won	
Annie Awards	Best Character Animation in a Feature Production	Philippe Le Brun	Nominated	
Annie Awards	Best Character Animation in a Feature Production	Dan Wagner	Nominated	
Annie Awards	Best Character Design in an Animated Feature Production	Nico Marlet	Won	
Annie Awards	Best Directing in an Animated Feature Production	John Stevenson; Mark Osborne	Won	
Annie Awards	Best Music in an Animated Feature Production	Hans Zimmer; John Powell	Won	
Annie Awards	Best Production Design in an Animated Feature Production	Tang Kheng Heng	Won	
Annie Awards	Best Production Design in an Animated Feature Production	Raymond Zibach	Nominated	
Annie Awards	Best Storyboarding in an Animated Feature Production	Jennifer Yuh Nelson	Won	
Annie Awards	Best Storyboarding in an Animated Feature Production	Alessandro Carloni	Nominated	
Annie Awards	Best Voice Acting in an Animated Feature Production	Dustin Hoffman	Won	
Annie Awards	Best Voice Acting in an Animated Feature Production	James Hong	Nominated	
Annie Awards	Best Voice Acting in an Animated Feature Production	Ian McShane	Nominated	
Annie Awards	Best Writing in an Animated Feature Production	Jonathan Aibel; Glenn Berger	Won	
ASCAP Award	Top Box Office Films	Hans Zimmer and John Powell	Won	
Critics' Choice Awards	Best Animated Feature		Nominated	
Chicago Film Critics Association Awards	Best Animated Feature		Nominated	
Golden Globe Awards	Best Animated Feature Film		Nominated	
Golden Tomato Awards 2008	Best Animated Feature	Kung Fu Panda	2nd Place	
Golden Tomato Awards 2008	Wide Release	Kung Fu Panda	5th Place	
Golden Reel Awards	Best Sound Editing: Sound Effects, Foley, Dialogue and ADR Animation in a Feature Film	Ethan Van Der Ryn; Erik Aadahl; Mike Hopkins; Jonathan Klein; Adam Milo Smalley; Peter Oso Snell; Wayne Lemmer; Paul Pirola; P.K. Hooker; Dan O'Connell; John Cucci	Nominated	
Golden Trailer Awards	Best Animation/Family		Nominated	
Huabiao Awards	Outstanding Translated Film		Won	
National Movie Awards	Best Family Film		Nominated	
Nickelodeon Kids' Choice Awards	Favorite Voice from an Animated Movie	Jack Black	Won	
Nickelodeon Kids' Choice Awards	Favorite Animated Movie		Nominated	
Online Film Critics Society	Best Animated Film		Nominated	
Producers Guild of America	Animated Motion Picture	Melissa Cobb	Nominated	
People's Choice Awards	Favorite Family Movie		Nominated	
Teen Choice Awards	Choice Summer Movie: Comedy		Nominated	
Visual Effects Society	Outstanding Animated Character in an Animated Motion Picture	Jack Black; Dan Wagner; Nico Marlet; Peter Farson	Nominated	
Visual Effects Society	Outstanding Animation in an Animated Motion Picture	Markus Manninen; Dan Wagner; Alex Parkinson; Raymond Zibach	Nominated	
Visual Effects Society	Outstanding Effects Animation in an Animated Motion Picture	Markus Manninen; Alex Parkinson; Amaury Aubel; Li-Ming 'Lawrence' Lee	Nominated	

== Soundtrack ==
Composer Hans Zimmer scored Kung Fu Panda. Zimmer visited China to absorb the culture, and got to know the Chinese National Symphony as part of his preparation. Timbaland also contributed to the soundtrack. The soundtrack also includes a partially rewritten version of the classic song, "Kung Fu Fighting", performed by Cee-Lo Green and Jack Black for the end credits. In some versions, the end credit was sung by Rain. Although Zimmer was originally announced as the main composer of the film, CEO of DreamWorks Animation SKG Jeffrey Katzenberg announced during a test screening that composer John Powell would also be contributing to the score. This marked the first collaboration in eight years for the two, who had previously worked together on DreamWorks's The Road to El Dorado and the action-thriller Chill Factor. The soundtrack album was released by Interscope Records June 3, 2008.

== Spin-offs ==
=== Manga ===
A manga based on the film was released in Japan in Kerokero Ace magazine's September 2008 issue. It was written by Hanten Okuma and illustrated by Takafumi Adachi.

=== Television series ===
A television series titled Kung Fu Panda: Legends of Awesomeness aired on Nickelodeon, with its premiere September 19, 2011. From the cast of Kung Fu Panda, only Lucy Liu and James Hong reprised their roles of Master Viper and Mr. Ping, respectively. In the series, Po continues to defend the Valley of Peace from all kinds of villains while making mistakes, learning about the history of kung fu, and meeting other kung fu masters. In the United States, the series ended its run June 29, 2016, with a total of three seasons and 80 episodes. However, prior to premiering in the U.S., the final few episodes premiered in Germany from December 30, 2014, to January 7, 2015.

Kung Fu Panda: The Paws of Destiny is an animated web-television series produced by DreamWorks Animation, released for Amazon Prime November 16, 2018. It is the second TV series in the Kung Fu Panda franchise, following Kung Fu Panda: Legends of Awesomeness. Mick Wingert reprised his role as Po from Legends of Awesomeness.

A third series, also set after Kung Fu Panda 3, titled Kung Fu Panda: The Dragon Knight, premiered on Netflix in July 2022, with Jack Black reprising his role as Po.

=== Holiday special ===
The television holiday special, titled Kung Fu Panda Holiday, aired on NBC Wednesday, November 24, 2010.

=== Video game ===
A video game adaptation of the film was published June 3, 2008, by Activision. The game was released for PlayStation 3, Xbox 360, Wii, PlayStation 2, Nintendo DS and PC platforms. The plot follows the same basic plot as the film, but with Tai Lung portrayed as the leader of various gangs that surround the Valley of Peace, which Po, who possesses some basic martial art skills that can be upgraded as the game progresses, must defeat. The game was released for Microsoft Windows, as well as multiple consoles.

The game received mostly positive reviews. It scored a Metacritic rating of 76%, and a 7.5 out of 10 from IGN. In 2009, it won the International Animated Film Society's Annie Award for Best Animated Video Game, "in recognition of creative excellence in the art of animation".

== Sequels ==
Following the financial success of Kung Fu Panda, DreamWorks Animation began development on a sequel. Kung Fu Panda 2 surpassed the box-office take of the first film, and received a similarly positive critical and audience response. A third film, Kung Fu Panda 3, was released in 2016, becoming one of the highest-grossing films of 2016. Kung Fu Panda 4 released on March 8, 2024.

== Literature ==
- 2008: Susan Korman: Kung Fu Panda - The Junior Novel (Novelization), HarperFestival, ISBN 978-0-0614-3463-1

== Lawsuits ==
DreamWorks Animation was sued in 2011 by a writer, Terence Dunn, for allegedly stealing the idea for Kung Fu Panda from him. Dunn alleged that DreamWorks Animation had stolen his pitch for a "spiritual kung-fu fighting panda bear" that he sent to a DreamWorks executive in 2001. DreamWorks Animation denied any wrongdoing, and after a two-week trial, the jurors found in favor of DreamWorks.

In 2011, another lawsuit was brought against the studio by an illustrator named Jayme Gordon. Gordon had supposedly created characters under the name "Kung Fu Panda Power" and registered them with the U.S. Copyright Office in 2000. He had allegedly pitched this concept to Disney while Jeffrey Katzenberg, who left Disney and formed DreamWorks Animation in 1994, was working there. Gordon withdrew his claim just before the trial was due to take place. On December 20, 2015, federal prosecutors charged Gordon with four counts of wire fraud and three counts of perjury for allegedly fabricating and backdating drawings to support the claims in his lawsuit, and for allegedly tracing some of his drawings from a coloring book featuring characters from Disney's The Lion King franchise. On November 18, 2016, Gordon was convicted for wire fraud and perjury, facing a sentence of up to 25 years in prison. In May 2017, he was sentenced to two years in federal prison and ordered to pay $3 million in restitution.

== See also ==
- Enter the Fat Dragon (1978)
- T'ai Fu: Wrath of the Tiger (1999)
- Legend of a Rabbit (2011)
- Shifu (or sifu), which means "skillful person" or a "master"
