= Little Women (1970 TV series) =

- Genre: Historical
- Based on: Little Women by Louisa May Alcott
- Written by: Denis Constanduros; Alistair Bell
- Directed by: Paddy Russell
- Starring: Jo Rowbottom; Janina Faye; Angela Down
- Country of origin: United Kingdom
- Original language: English
- No. of series: 1
- No. of episodes: 9

Production
- Producer: John McRae
- Running time: 25 minutes
- Production company: BBC

Original release
- Network: BBC One
- Release: 25 October – 20 December 1970

Little Women is a BBC television series in 1970, based on the 1868-69 two-volume novel of the same name by Louisa May Alcott. It was the third BBC adaptation of the novel.

It was shown on the Sunday tea-time slot on BBC1, where the BBC often showed fairly faithful adaptations of classic novels aimed at a family audience. It consisted of nine episodes.

It is not one of the better-remembered adaptations of Little Women, possibly because it was made on a relatively low budget and nearly all shot in the studio. There were also comments about the actresses playing the March sisters being too old for the part, and some of the cast struggling with an American accent. However it did have some merits e.g. the character of Laurie was more developed than in some versions, and it may have stuck to the original novel more closely than some adaptations e.g. by showing the March sisters often quarreling (this was discussed in the letters page of the Radio Times).

== Cast ==
- Angela Down as Jo March
- Jo Rowbottom as Meg March
- Janina Faye as Amy March
- Stephanie Bidmead as Mrs. March
- Stephen Turner as Laurie
- Martin Jarvis as John Brooke
- Pat Nye as Hannah
- Sarah Craze as Beth March
- John Welsh as Mr. Laurence
- Jean Anderson as Aunt March
- Patrick Troughton as Mr. March
- Philip Ray as Rodgers
- Frederick Jaeger as Professor Bhaer
- Brian Badcoe as Doctor
- Beth Ellis as Mrs. Kirke
- Richard Franklin as Jack Scott
- John Rapley as The Editor
