= Mary-Pat Green =

American actress (1951–2024)

- Born: September 24, 1951; Kansas City, Missouri, U.S.
- Died: September 9, 2024 (aged 72)
- Occupation: Actress
- Years active: 1974–2022

Mary-Pat Green (September 25, 1951 – September 9, 2024) was an American film, television and theatre actress.

== Life and career ==
=== Television and film ===
Green is best known for playing Odessa on the television series Any Day Now. She has appeared as a guest star on many television series, including Saving Grace, Eli Stone, My Name Is Earl, Home Improvement, NYPD Blue, Married... with Children, Melrose Place, The Drew Carey Show, Step by Step, Murder, She Wrote, Friends, Millennium, Buffy the Vampire Slayer, Ally McBeal, Six Feet Under, The West Wing, Desperate Housewives, Cold Case, The Middle, Anger Management, Mom, and others.

=== Theatre ===
Green appeared on Broadway in the original cast of Sweeney Todd and the 1974 revival of Candide. She performed the role of Reverend Mother in Nunsense over 1500 times and in 2002 she played Lorena Hickok in Michael John LaChiusa's musical First Lady Suite.

In 1989, Green took over the role of Miss Hannigan in a production of Annie at the Starlight Theatre in Kansas City.

In 1996, she played the title role in the premiere of Claudia Allen's Hannah Free at Victory Gardens Theatre in Chicago. Richard Christiansen of Chicago Tribune wrote her role was "admirably acted".

=== Death ===
Green died from complications of Alzheimer's disease on September 9, 2024, at the age of 72.

== Filmography ==
=== Film ===
Year	Title	Role	Notes
1976	Taxi Driver	Campaign Aide	Uncredited
1980	Willie & Phil	Film Crew	
1993	Lightning in a Bottle	Flo	
1995	Dead Badge	Waitress	Direct-to-video
1995	Josh Kirby: Time Warrior! Chap. 1: Planet of the Dino-Knights	Lady in Waiting	Direct-to-video
1995	Josh Kirby: Time Warrior! Chap. 2: The Human Pets	Lady in Waiting	Direct-to-video
1997	Just Write	Teenager's Mother	
1997	My Best Friend's Wedding	Angry Woman	
1998	Why Do Fools Fall in Love	Guard	
1999	Twin Falls Idaho	Nurse	
2000	Attention Shoppers	Sandwich Woman	
2001	In Pursuit	Receptionist	Direct-to-video
2002	XXX	Waitress	
2005	Little Athens	Mrs. Carson	
2005	In Her Shoes	Diner Waitress	
2006	The Break-Up	Mischa	
2008	Drillbit Taylor	Nurse	
2008	Yes Man	Tour Guide	
2012	A Glimpse Inside the Mind of Charles Swan III	Nurse	
2013	Watercolor Postcards	Tilda	
2015	Fantastic Four	Mrs. Grimm	Final Film Role

=== Television ===
Year	Title	Role	Notes
1991	False Arrest	Female Officer	Television film
1993	Home Improvement	Daphne	Episode: "Karate or Not, Here I Come"
1993	There Was a Little Boy	Parent	Television film
1993	Getting By	Miss Farley	Episode: "Faking the Grade"
1993	Saved by the Bell: The College Years	Marlene	Episode: "A Question of Ethics"
1993–1996	Married... with Children	Marge / Mary Pat	5 episodes
1993, 1997	NYPD Blue	Russian Woman / Bartender #2	2 episodes
1994	The Mommies	Screaming Mother	Episode: "Home Alone"
1994	Hart to Hart: Home Is Where the Hart Is	Pamela Tewksbury	Television film
1994	Melrose Place	Nurse	Episode: "Love, Mancini Style"
1994	Coach	Audrey	Episode: "Be a Good Sport"
1995	Diagnosis: Murder	Landlady	Episode: "Call Me Incontestable"
1995	Beverly Hills, 90210	Jail Matron	Episode: "Offensive Interference"
1995	The Drew Carey Show	Mary / Woman #1	2 episodes
1995, 1996	Step by Step	Hilda / Ludmilla	2 episodes
1996	Murder, She Wrote	Nora Delano	Episode: "The Dark Side of the Door"
1996	Cybill	Tomato	Episode: "A Who's Who for What's His Name"
1996	Land's End	Florence	Episode: "Pieces of 8 Is Enough"
1996	High Incident	Amanda	Episode: "Pilot"
1996	The Wayans Bros.	Mildred	Episode: "It Takes a Thief"
1996	Friends	Jeannie	Episode: "The One With the Chicken Pox"
1996	Life with Roger	Nurse	Episode: "Pilot"
1996	Suddenly Susan	Brenda	Episode: Hoop Dreams"
1997	3rd Rock from the Sun	Diane	Episode: "Romeo & Juliet & Dick"
1997	Hang Time	Minnie	Episode: "Sexual Harassment"
1998	Millennium	Sonny	Episode: "In Arcadia Ego"
1998	Buffy the Vampire Slayer	Blood Bank Doctor	Episode: "Anne"
1998–2001	Any Day Now	Odess	16 episodes
1999	My Last Love	Nurse Janet	Television film
2000	Opposite Sex	DMV Woman	Episode: "The Car Episode"
2000	The Norm Show	Ruby	Episode: "Norm and the Hopeless Cause"
2000, 2001	Ally McBeal	Judge Julia 'Bulldog' Brattle	2 episodes
2001	Becker	Denise	Episode: "Heart Breaker"
2001	First Years	Awards Speaker	Episode: "There's No Place Like Homo"
2001	State of Grace	Sister Clancy	2 episodes
2001	ER	Miss McDuffy	Episode: "Never Say Never"
2001	Raising Dad	Mrs. Doherty	Episode: "The Drama Club"
2001, 2002	Six Feet Under	Priest	2 episodes
2002, 2005	The West Wing	Vermont Congresswoman / Senator	2 episodes
2003	Murder, She Wrote: The Celtic Riddle	Brigie Murphy	Television film
2003	Passions	Death Row Inmate	Episode #1.1000
2003, 2007	Days of Our Lives	Sandy / Sister Katherine	2 episodes
2004	Still Standing	Emma	Episode: "Still Responsible"
2004	Charmed	Miss Hickock	Episode: "Hyde School Reunion"
2004	The B.P.R.D. Declassified	Deb Kronrooys	Television film
2005	Desperate Housewives	Nurse Abagail	Episode: "The Ladies Who Lunch"
2005	Night Stalker	Mrs. Sampson	Episode: "Malum"
2006	The Evidence	Fawn Lafferty	Episode: "Borrowed Time"
2006	Cold Case	Eugenia Karpathian	Episode: "Lonely Hearts"
2007	My Name Is Earl	Mrs. Harding	Episode: "G.E.D."
2008	Eli Stone	Judge Joyce Abramovich	Episode: "I Want Your Sex"
2008	The Young and the Restless	Matron	2 episodes
2009	Important Things with Demetri Martin	Receptionistt	Episode: "Coolness"
2009–2011	The Middle	Principal Larimer	3 episodes
2010	Castle	Erin Murphy	Episode: "Boom!"
2010	Sonny with a Chance	Massage Therapist	Episode: "Chad without a Chance"
2010	Wizards of Waverly Place	Mia	Episode: "Alex Saves Mason (Wizards Unleashed)"
2011	The Mentalist	Bureaucrat	Episode: "Blood and Sand"
2012	General Hospital	Nurse Fletcher	Episode #1.12525
2012, 2013	American Horror Story	Nun #1	2 episodes
2014	Murder in the First	Waller	Episode: "Burning Woman"
2014	Anger Management	Greta	Episode: "Charlie and the Epic Relationship Fail"
2014	Damaged Goods	Waitress	Television film
2016	Mom	Susie	Episode: "Sparkling Water and Ba-Dinkers"
2017	SEAL Team	Edna	Episode: "The Spinning Wheel"
2018	Camping	Clementine	Episode: "Going to Town"
2018	Adam Ruins Everything	Cathy's Science Teacher	Episode: "Adam Ruins Sleep"
2019	Cake	Mrs. Beckett	Episode: "Cache Flow"
2019	Oh Jerome, No	Mrs. Beckett	Episode: "Toughen Up"
2020	NCIS: Los Angeles	Carla	Episode: "Commitment Issues"
