= Barrie Ingham =

English actor (1932–2015)

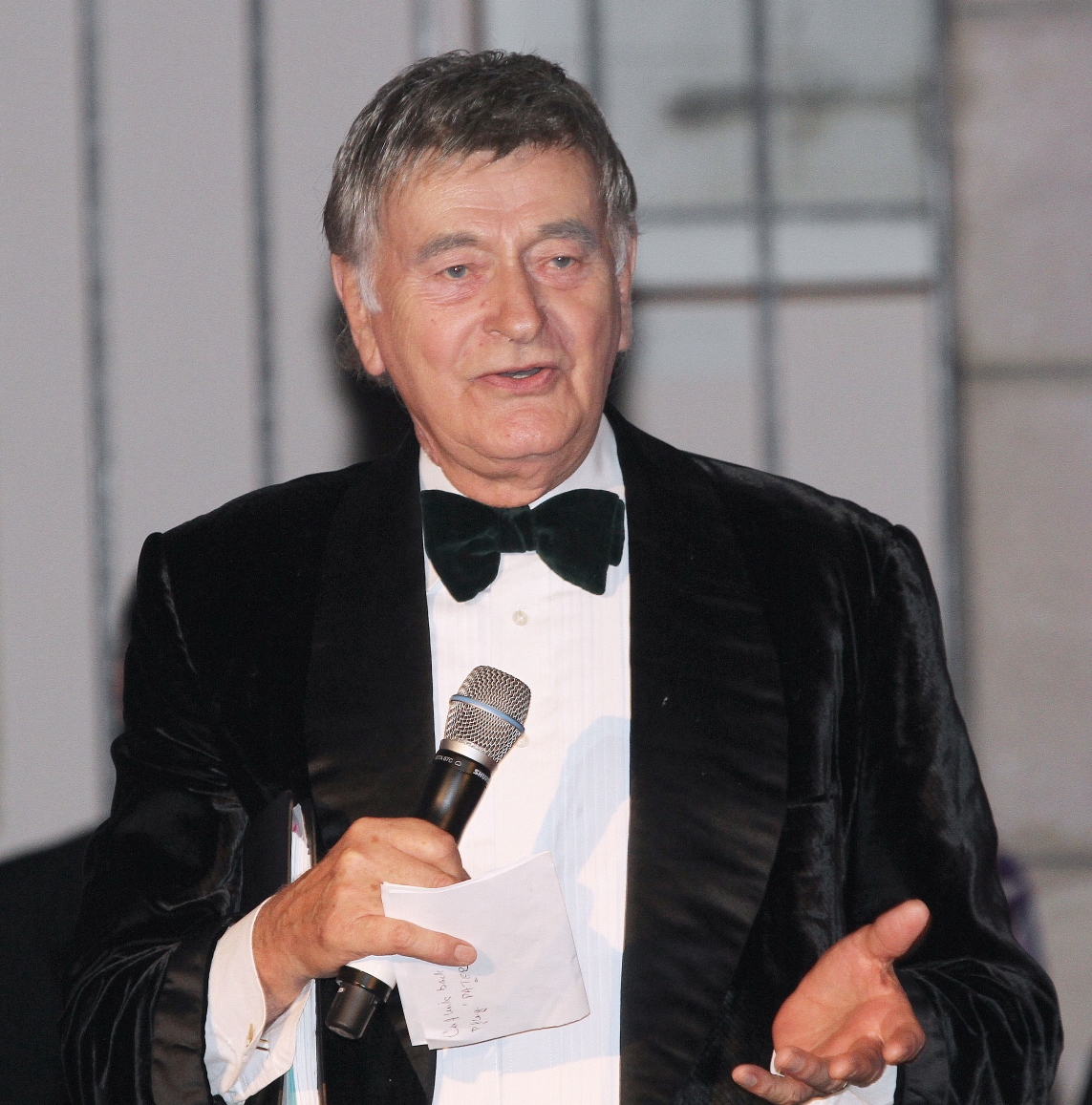
- Ingham in March 2011
- Born: Barrie Stanton Ingham; 10 February 1932; Halifax, West Riding of Yorkshire, England
- Died: 23 January 2015 (aged 82); Palm Beach Gardens, Florida, U.S.
- Other name: Barry Ingham
- Occupations: Actor, MC
- Years active: 1957–2005
- Spouse: Tarne Ingham (m. 1957)
- Children: 4

Barrie Stanton Ingham (10 February 1932 – 23 January 2015) was an English actor. He worked in television, on stage and in several films.

== Early life ==
Ingham was born in 1932 in Halifax, West Riding of Yorkshire, to Irene (née Bolton) and Harold Ellis Stead Ingham. He was educated at Heath Grammar School and became a Royal Artillery officer.

== Acting career ==
Ingham made his debut in Manchester with the Library Theatre Company, and then he moved to London's Old Vic. He also performed with the Royal Shakespeare Company, Mermaid Theatre Company and Royal National Theatre.

Ingham featured in over 200 British and American films and TV productions. He played the lead role of Robin Hood in A Challenge for Robin Hood (1967). After playing Sejanus in Granada TV's The Caesars (1968), he had a short spell as an ambitious government minister in The Power Game in 1969. In 1971, Ingham took the leading role in the series Hine, as an unscrupulous arms dealer. Sir John Gielgud gave him his Broadway debut and he subsequently played in many Broadway musicals, including Copperfield on Broadway, and opposite Angela Lansbury in the London production of Gypsy: A Musical Fable in 1973. When the production transferred to Broadway, Ingham did not remain with the show. He was acclaimed for his performance as King Pellinore in the 1981-82 revival of Camelot starring Richard Harris. In 1986, he voiced Basil of Baker Street, the lead character of Disney's The Great Mouse Detective.

In 1991–92, Bingham was in the final cast of Andrew Lloyd Webber's Aspects of Love, opposite Sarah Brightman on Broadway. His last Broadway outing was in the Broadway musical Jekyll & Hyde as Sir Danvers Carew. Ingham opened the show in 1997 and remained with it for four years until closing in January 2001. He also appeared in the 2001 film version of the musical.

Ingham appeared onstage in Australia, appearing in Noël Coward's Private Lives, in Sydney in 1976.

== Personal life ==
Ingham married Tarne Phillips Ingham in 1957; together they had four children.

== Death ==
Ingham died at his home in Palm Beach Gardens, Florida aged 82. He was survived by his wife, Tarne Phillips Ingham, and their children.

== Filmography ==
=== Film ===
Year	Title	Role	Notes
1961	Edgar Wallace Mysteries	Gordon (hairdresser)	Episode: "The Fourth Square"
1962	Edgar Wallace Mysteries	house agent	Episode: "Number Six"
1965	Dr. Who and the Daleks	Alydon	
1965	Invasion	Major Muncaster	
1966	The Scales of Justice	Major MacDonald	Episode: "Company of Fools"
1967	A Challenge for Robin Hood	Robin Hood	
1972	Steptoe and Son	Terry	Uncredited
1973	The Day of the Jackal	George St. Clair	
1983	Sparkling Cyanide	Eric Kidderminster	
1984	George Washington	General Clinton	
1986	The Great Mouse Detective	Basil of Baker Street	Voice
1995	Josh Kirby... Time Warrior: Chapter 1, Planet of the Dino-Knights	Irwin 1138	
1995	Josh Kirby... Time Warrior: Chapter 2, the Human Pets	Irwin 1138	
1995	Josh Kirby... Time Warrior: Chapter 3, Trapped on Toyworld	Irwin 1138	
1995	Josh Kirby... Time Warrior: Chapter 4, Eggs from 70 Million B.C.	Irwin 1138	
1996	Josh Kirby... Time Warrior: Chapter 5, Journey to the Magic Cavern	Irwin 1138	
1996	Josh Kirby... Time Warrior: Chapter 6, Last Battle for the Universe	Irwin 1138	
1996	The Bruce	Gloucester	

=== Television ===
Year	Title	Role	Notes				
1961	Danger Man	Georges	Episode: "The Vacation"				
1964	Ann Veronica	Hubert Manning	3 episodes				
1965	Doctor Who	Paris	The Myth Makers				
1966	The Baron	Roland Haswell	Episode: "Long Ago and Far Away"				
1967	Mr Rose	Stefan Ruvanski	Episode: "The Avenging Angel"				
1967	The Avengers	George Unwin	Episode: "You Have Just Been Murdered"				
1969	The Power Game	Garfield Kane	4 episodes				
1970	Randall and Hopkirk (Deceased)	Emil Cavallo-Smith	Episode: "Vendetta for a Dead Man"				
1971	Hine	Joe Hine					
1978	The Sweeney	DCS Canning	Episode: Jack or Knave				
1981	Funny Man	Bobby Stobart	7 episodes				
1982	Camelot (TV)	Pellinore					
1982	The Jeffersons		Episode: "Death Smiles on a Dry Cleaner"				
1983	Remington Steele	Derek Vivyan	Episode: "Scene Steelers"				
1983	Hart to Hart	Mr. Tween	Episode: "Bahama Bound Harts"				
1983	Antony and Cleopatra	Enobarbus	Movie				
1984	Airwolf	Vladimir Kinskov	Episode: "Fallen Angel" (1984|-Faerie Tale Theatre 2 Episodes The Princess Who Had Never Laughed and The Emperor's New Clothes	1985	The A-Team	Chuck LeCraw	Episode: "Members Only"
1985	My Wicked, Wicked Ways: The Legend of Errol Flynn	John Barrymore					
1985–1993	Murder, She Wrote	Brian Dunbar; Insp. Roger Crimmins	2 episodes				
1987	Matlock	Butler	Episode: "The Billionaire"				
1989	Webster	Hastings	Episode: "The Visitor"				
1989	Star Trek: The Next Generation	Danilo Odell	Episode: "Up the Long Ladder"				
2001	Jekyll & Hyde – The Musical	Sir Danvers Carew	Movie				
2005	The Triangle	Doug Weist	Episode #1.1; Episode #1.2; Episode #1.3, (final appearance)				
