= Hine (TV series) =

British television series

- Genre: Drama
- Created by: Wilfred Greatorex
- Starring: Barrie Ingham; Sarah Craze; Colin Gordon; John Steiner
- Country of origin: United Kingdom
- No. of series: 1
- No. of episodes: 13

Production
- Producer: Wilfred Greatorex
- Production company: ATV

Original release
- Network: ITV
- Release: 7 April – 30 June 1971

Hine is a 1971 British drama television series set in the Middle East which was created by Wilfred Greatorex. The series stars Barrie Ingham as international arms dealer Joe Hine. Paul Eddington portrays Astor Harris, an arms manufacturer with close ties to the British government, and John Steiner plays Hine's personal assistant Jeremy Windsor. Other cast members include Sarah Craze as Hine's secretary Susannah Grey, Colin Gordon as Walpole Gibb, and John Moreno as Frank the Chauffeur. The series premiered on April 7, 1971 on Associated Television. It ran for a total of 13 episodes in a single season, and all are now available on DVD.

== Cast ==
- Barrie Ingham as Joe Hine
- Sarah Craze as Susannah Grey
- Colin Gordon as Walpole Gibb
- John Steiner as Jeremy Windsor
- Paul Eddington as Astor Harris
- John Moreno as Frank the Chauffeur
- Maxwell Shaw as Rashid
- Patricia Hamilton as Miss Tarrant
- Michael Goodliffe as Sir Christopher Pendle
- Nik Zaran as General Khoury
- Ann Bell as Liz Hine
- Stefan Kalipha as Mbusa
- Arthur Blake as Proprietor / Waiter
- James Kerry as Dobson
- Jasmina Hilton as Farah

== Episodes ==
Episode title	Original air date (UK)	Guest cast
"Rifles Are Dangerous"	7 April 1971	John Bay
"The Abominable No-Men"	14 April 1971	John Westbrook, Peter Welch, Malcolm Terris
"What's Wrong if the Price is Right?"	21 April 1971	Lee Montague, Ann Lynn, Hamilton Dyce, Roger Rowland
"The Sterile Weapons"	28 April 1971	Reginald Marsh, Angela Grant, Don McKillop, Peter Cartwright, Arthur White
"Caviare and Chips"	5 May 1971	Michael Coles, John Glyn-Jones, Heather Canning, Jack Smethurst
"Missiles for Sale, as New - One Owner"	12 May 1971	Hans Meyer, John Ringham, Alan White
"The Old School Noose"	19 May 1971	Ronald Lewis, David Burke, John Savident
"The Little White Lady"	26 May 1971	Maxine Audley, Claire Nielson, Wolfe Morris, Tom Browne, Tom Marshall, Madeline Smith, Frank Mills, Me Me Lai
"To Have and to Hold"	2 June 1971	Michael Gover, Clifford Parrish, Simon Cadell
"Comrades in Arms"	9 June 1971	Peter Madden, Rudolph Walker, Oscar James, John Comer
"Survival of the Creeps"	16 June 1971	Timothy West, Morris Perry, Frederick Hall, Robert Dorning
"Everything I Am I Owe"	23 June 1971	Nigel Hawthorne, Elliott Sullivan, David Baron, Steve Plytas, Veronica Carlson
"The Big Package"	30 June 1971	Leonard Maguire, Arnold Diamond, André Maranne
