= Men of War (1994 film) =

1994 American action film by Perry Lang

- Promotional release poster
- Directed by: Perry Lang
- Screenplay by: John Sayles; Ethan Reiff; Cyrus Voris
- Produced by: Arthur Goldblatt; Andrew Pfeffer
- Starring: Dolph Lundgren; Charlotte Lewis
- Cinematography: Rohn Schmidt
- Edited by: Jeffrey Reiner
- Music by: Gerald Gouriet; Paul Rabjohns
- Production companies: MDP Worldwide; Pomerance Corporation; Grandview Avenue Pictures
- Distributed by: Miramax Films; MDP Worldwide
- Release dates: September 3, 1994 (Japan); December 19, 1995 (United States)
- Running time: 103 minutes
- Countries: United States; Spain; Thailand
- Language: English
- Budget: $6 million

Men of War is a 1994 action film directed by Perry Lang, written by John Sayles, and revised by Ethan Reiff and Cyrus Voris. It stars Dolph Lundgren as Nick Gunar, a former Special Ops soldier who leads a group of mercenaries to a treasure island in the South China Sea.

== Plot ==
Nick Gunar, an ex-soldier, is down and out in Chicago in a typically cold winter. When two men offer him a job on a tropical island, he reluctantly agrees and gathers together a group of soldier friends also down on their luck. They arrive in the Far East and come up against the evil Keefer, who was with Nick in Angola. He now owns the local police force and shows Nick and the others who is boss. Afterwards, Nick and his crew go to the island, which they find is occupied by peaceful natives—natives who the mercenaries are supposed to convince to abandon the island. Nick respects them, but there is friction caused by a few mercenaries who want to kill natives to persuade them to leave, or, alternatively, to get them to divulge where a suspected treasure might be. Nick stops them and finds out the "treasure" they are after is guano (which does have value in sufficient quantities). The two men paying the mercenaries intend to strip mine the island to get it, leaving the natives and their homes as casualties. The group divides up, with half wishing to finish the job for which they were paid, and the other half, led by Nick, wishing to protect the islanders. Nick hands the former group their pay and orders them to leave the island as he refuses to kill the natives to do the job.

Meanwhile, Keefer and the Colonel, who suspect there is money to be made, join the group Nick kicked out. They then storm the island with many new mercenaries, hoping to force off or exterminate Nick, his soldiers, and the natives. Many of the invaders are shot, stabbed, blown up, and worse in the ensuing battle. Though poorly armed, the natives make up for this in trickery and local knowledge. Nick has a bazooka-style weapon (a Carl Gustav), which causes mayhem. After a number of attacks by both sides, many are dead and there is a final showdown between Nick and Keefer; Keefer gains the upper hand in the fist fight and attempts to strangle Nick to death while drowning him. Nick manages to grab a nearby bone and stab Keefer in the neck, then proceeds to drown him. As the natives bury their dead, the few surviving mercenaries leave, but Nick stays behind.

== Cast ==
- Dolph Lundgren as Nick Gunar
- Charlotte Lewis as Loki
- B. D. Wong as Po
- Anthony Denison as Jimmy "Jimmy G"
- Tim Guinee as Ocker
- Don Harvey as Nolan
- Tom Lister, Jr. as Blades
- Tom Wright as Jamaal
- Catherine Bell as Grace Lashield
- Trevor Goddard as Keefer
- Kevin Tighe as Colonel Merrick
- Thomas Gibson as Warren
- Perry Lang as Lyle
- Aldo Sambrell as "Goldmouth"
- Juan Pedro Tudela as Waldo

== Production ==
The film was based on an original screenplay by John Sayles called A Safe Place, written in the early 1980s for producer Stan Rogow. Sayles' original idea for the plot involved a mercenary who rethinks his life when he comes upon a tribe of pacifists. Rewrites from Reiff and Voris added more testosterone-fueled action.

According to Voris:

It was actually an old Sayles script that some producers bought and wanted to make for action star Dolph Lundgren! The Sayles script needed to be brought up to date a little, more action scenes added and, most importantly, had to be made into an ensemble movie because the producers were worried that Dolph just couldn't carry the movie that John Sayles originally wrote. And that an audience wouldn't sit still to watch Lundgren tackle all those great John Sayles monologues. ... We were actually pretty deferential to Sayles' original script and the finished movie is actually quite a good little action flick. ... Probably the only time we'll ever get a chance to rewrite John Sayles.

The original script featured a prologue set in Afghanistan.

Filming took place in Thailand between September and December 1993, and production officially ended in January 1994. Following the excellent test screenings reactions that the movie had, Miramax had bought it from another company with a promise of theatrical release, but then they dumped it on video because they thought that Dolph Lundgren couldn't bring the audience if he was main hero in the film. This is why movie was shelved and delayed until December 1995 when it was released on video in US, although it was released earlier in some other countries, like for example in France (in July 1995) where although it wasn't success it got great reviews from critics. John Sayles, who wrote the original script (before it was partially re-written to add more action and humor) also said some years later how it was very good action movie and some of Lundgren's best work.

== Release ==
Vision International sold the rights to distribution at the 1993 American Film Market. Dimension initially released Men of War in the United States in 1995. On November 14, 2000, Dimension released the film on DVD in the United States in Region 1. On February 23, 2009, Anchor Bay Entertainment released it on DVD in the United Kingdom in Region 2.

== Reception ==
Michael Sauter of Entertainment Weekly rated it C− and called it a "straight-to-video clunker".

Susan King of the Los Angeles Times called it "a better-than-average straight-to-video action thriller."

Leigh Riding of DVDactive rated it 7/10 stars and called it "a sturdy action drama" that is "surprisingly intriguing and entertaining".

Rachel Adams and David Savran in their book The masculinity studies reader said "Men of War invokes the most vividly remembered fighting in a foreign land of recent Western history. This innovation, associating the muscle image with the Vietnam experience, is carried over into other contemporary muscle films."

Mick Martin and Marsha Porter said in the DVD & video guide 2005 said, "fine performances by an all-star Dolph Lundgren as a mercenary assigned to "convince" a cast in this offbeat and disturbing film."
