= Airline (1982 TV series) =

- Series titles
- Created by: Wilfred Greatorex
- Starring: Roy Marsden; Richard Heffer; Sean Scanlan; Polly Hemingway; Terence Rigby
- Country of origin: United Kingdom
- Original language: English
- No. of series: 1
- No. of episodes: 9

Production
- Running time: 50 minutes approx.
- Production company: Yorkshire Television

Original release
- Network: ITV
- Release: 3 January – 28 February 1982

Airline is a British television series produced by Yorkshire Television for the ITV network in 1982. The series starred Roy Marsden as Jack Ruskin, a pilot demobbed after the end of the Second World War who starts his own air transport business.

Airline was created by Wilfred Greatorex and lasted for one series of nine episodes broadcast in January and February 1982, with a repeat in the summer of 1984. Other leading cast members were Polly Hemingway, Richard Heffer, Nicholas Bond-Owen, Sean Scanlan and Terence Rigby, while noted guest stars included Anthony Valentine and Walter Gotell (better known for his numerous guest stints as KGB General Gogol in a string of James Bond films during the Cold War era).

== Production ==
The main location filming was at the former RAF Rufforth in Yorkshire, former RAF Duxford airfield in Cambridgeshire, and on the island of Malta.

The aerial unit was managed by the Aces High Company, who operated two C-47/DC-3 aircraft for the series: "G-AGIV"/'Alice' (former USAAF and Spanish Air Force C-47A G-BHUB, now in the American Air Museum in Britain at the Imperial War Museum Duxford, painted in its original markings as "W7"/43-15509) – which featured a postwar drop-down airliner door – and the famous C-47A G-DAKS, which was previously used by the Royal Aircraft Establishment and had an extended nose originally used to test Ferranti / Marconi radar for the English Electric Lightning. This aircraft was retired by the RAE and ferried to RAF Catterick's Fire Training Ground to be used as a fire training aid but was saved by Mike Woodley of Aces High at the last minute, being purchased by him from the UK Ministry of Defence. The extended nose was replaced at Duxford by Aces High's chief engineer to enable the aircraft to appear as "G-AGHY"/'Vera Lynn'.

During production, a Taylorcraft Auster and a North American Harvard, rented from private owners, were also featured—as were shots of grounded/stored Douglas DC-3's in Malta, which were used for the Berlin Airlift scenes in the final episode.

All 9 episodes were filmed in Summer 1981

== Later events ==
Although originally planned as a long running series which could run up to the present day, the series ended up being cut short. Towards the end of the production of Airline, Greatorex objected to the editing of the series, which he saw as Yorkshire TV engaging in unauthorised script rewrites. As a result only nine episodes were made. A second series of Airline was planned to start filming in 1983 and additional aircraft had been purchased by Aces High for the production (including the Lockheed Constellation now at the Science Museum at Wroughton) but the dispute resulted in the series being axed by Yorkshire Television. Aces High subsequently moved operations to North Weald airfield in Essex, donating G-BHUB to the IWM and the Constellation to Wroughton, where both remain on display today.

In 1987 the main characters from Airline (along with the theme music by Tony Hatch) appeared in adverts for shares in British Airports Authority. Wilfred Greatorex was unaware until he saw them appear on television, and subsequently took legal action against the advertising agency over his intellectual property.

C-47A G-DAKS can now be frequently seen on BBC's Top Gear programme, normally parked next to the Boeing 747 on the hard standing behind the show's race track. The main Top Gear studios are located at Dunsfold Park Aerodrome, which has also been Aces High's base since moving from North Weald in the early 2000s. G-DAKS is still regularly flown for TV and movie work, now on the American register as N147DC.

== DVD release ==
The complete series of Airline is available on DVD in the UK.

== Episode list ==
#	Title	First transmission (UK)	Director	Writer
1	"Look After Number One"	3 January 1982, 9 p.m.	Michael Ferguson	Wilfred Greatorex
2	"Brave New World"	10 January 1982, 9.15 p.m.	Michael Ferguson	Wilfred Greatorex
3	"Conscience"	17 January 1982, 9 p.m.	Michael Ferguson	Wilfred Greatorex
4	"Touch and Go"	24 January 1982, 9 p.m.	Roger Cheveley	Wilfred Greatorex
5	"Fools' Errands"	31 January 1982, 9 p.m.	Roger Cheveley	Nick McCarty
6	"Captain Clarke Plus One"	7 February 1982, 9 p.m.	Michael Ferguson	Ray Jenkins
7	"Not Much of a Life"	14 February 1982, 9 p.m.	Peter Duguid & Roger Cheveley	Jane Franklin
8	"Officers and Gentlemen"	21 February 1982, 9 p.m.	Roger Cheveley	Nick McCarty
9	"Too Many Promises"	28 February 1982, 9 p.m.	Michael Ferguson	Michael Russell
