= Sarah Craze =

British actress

Sarah Craze (born 1948 in Leeds) is a British actress who appeared on stage and television during the 1970s and 1980s, and was known for the command and sensitivity of her performances.

== Career ==
Craze studied acting at the Royal Academy of Dramatic Art, London, graduating in 1969. The following year, she appeared in two television mini-series, playing Beth in Little Women, and Kate Meyrick in the 1970 version of Daniel Deronda. In 1971, she had a regular part as the secretary in the series Hine. When this ended after one series, one reviewer commented, "we shall miss some attractive actors ... [including] a strangely attractive girl in Sarah Craze". Stage appearances in the following years included a modern play, Children of the Wolf, of which one reviewer commented, "Quite the most startling and striking performance of the evening .. comes from Sarah Craze, whose menace as the daughter, Linda, is quickly established and never relents in its unmerciful progress to climactic inevitability. She is an actress of whom we should hear more." In 1973, she appeared with the Oxford Playhouse Company and the Royal Lyceum Theatre Company. Her performance with the former in J.M. Barrie's Dear Brutus was described as "an exceptionally sensitive characterisation." Television appearances included the 1973 film of Christopher Hampton's Total Eclipse, and significant roles in an episode of the series Colditz (1974) and Softly, Softly (1975). In 1977, Craze worked with London Contemporary Productions and with the Worcester Repertory Company. A review of the Worcester Repertory's performance of Mrs Warren's Profession in 1977 said, "The evening is a triumph for Sarah Craze ... She is emphatic, brusque, matter-of-fact ... Yet there is never much doubt of the warm, desperate person beneath the surface."

=== Selected stage performances ===
Year	Title	Theatre	Role
1972	Children of the Wolf	Belgrade Theatre, Coventry	Linda
1977	Mrs Warren's Profession	Swan Theatre, Worcester	Vivie
1978	An Inspector Calls	Shaw Theatre, London	Sheila Birling
1973	Dear Brutus	Oxford Playhouse	Margaret
1973	The Merchant of Venice	Oxford Playhouse	Jessica
1973	Much Ado About Nothing	Royal Lyceum Theatre	Hero
1977	Funny Peculiar	Swan Theatre, Worcester	

=== Selected television performances ===
Year	Title	Role	Notes
1973	Total Eclipse	Mathilde Verlaine	movie
1970	Little Women	Beth	mini-series
1971	Hine	Susannah Grey (secretary)	series
1975	Softly, Softly	Samantha (girl who blackmails firms with incendiary devices)	1 episode
1974	Colditz	Gerda	1 episode
