= Brimstone (TV series) =

American fantasy TV series (1998–1999)

- Created by: Ethan Reiff; Cyrus Voris
- Starring: Peter Horton; John Glover
- Country of origin: United States
- Original language: English
- No. of seasons: 1
- No. of episodes: 13

Production
- Running time: 60 minutes
- Production companies: Lars Thorwald Inc.; Warner Bros. Television

Original release
- Network: Fox
- Release: October 23, 1998 – February 12, 1999

Brimstone is an American television series that aired only one partial season on Fox, during the 1998–99 American television season. It features a dead police detective whose mission, as assigned by the Devil, is to return to Hell 113 souls who have escaped to Earth.

== Plot ==
In 1983, Ezekiel "Zeke" Stone (Peter Horton) was a New York City Police Robbery-Homicide detective whose wife, Rosalyn, was raped. He tracked down and arrested the offender, Gilbert Jax, who was cleared of the charges. Furious, Stone then secretly murdered Jax. Two months later, Stone was killed in an unrelated incident and went to Hell for murdering Jax. Later in the show it was revealed that it was not the killing itself that condemned Stone to Hell, but the fact he took pleasure in it. Stone died the most decorated cop in east NYC history.

In 1998, a breakout from Hell occurs, led by a 4000-year-old Canaanite priestess named Ashur Badaktu. The Devil explains that, over the centuries, a few souls have escaped (and presumably been returned to) Hell, but nothing of this magnitude, which includes 113 souls. Because the Devil is largely powerless on Earth, he makes a deal with Stone: Stone will be returned to Earth to track down these 113 escapees, and if he can return all of them to Hell (before one of them kills him), he will earn a second chance at life on Earth (and thus, possibly, Heaven). The Devil seems to hinder Stone's work almost as much as he helps it, however, divulging some information but withholding crucial facts or giving only cryptic clues to where Stone will find an escapee, apparently delighting in watching him become more irritable with his interference. It was suggested by an angel (in the episode "It's a Helluva Life", played by John Glover in a dual role) that Stone served God's purpose as well as the Devil's in his former life when he killed his wife's rapist.

=== Powers and equipment ===
Both Stone and his quarry have superhuman powers related to the amount of time each individual had spent in Hell. Being deceased, immortal souls, both Stone and the escapees he chases do not display many of the same physical limitations and weaknesses as the living. Throughout the series, they are shown to be unharmed by traditionally fatal encounters with fire or falling from great heights. They do not bleed, nor do they have a heartbeat. The souls cannot be killed, and injuries can only be inflicted to their eyes (it is shown the Devil can alter this rule somewhat, as he did in the episode "Encore"), by the living or dead. Even with the relatively restricted ways in which a soul can be harmed, as told by the Devil, they can only feel pain (and later we learn can also become sick) if it is inflicted by another escaped damned soul.

Each morning the souls (including Stone) wake up in the clothing they were wearing at their time of death. Any material items they had in their pockets when they died continuously regenerate each morning. In Stone's case, this means he awakens to find his badge, his fully loaded service pistol, and $36.27—the amount of money he was carrying when he was murdered—on his person. This is a not-so-subtle biblical reference. Ezekiel 36:27 says "And I will put my Spirit in you and move you to follow my decrees and be careful to keep my laws" which is a succinct summation of Stone's new role. Normally Stone's items (gun, badge, etc.) retain no damage from day to day, even if they are hit by bullets. However this rule is inconsistently applied, as he takes his coat to a tailor in "Repentance", attempting to have it mended on a different day than when the damage occurred.

=== Fighting villains ===
The Devil informs Stone that because the eyes "are windows to the soul", Stone must pierce the eyes of an escapee to return them to Hell. This rule also applies to Stone himself; however, this was modified by the Devil in a special case when Stone had to return the man who raped his wife. To kill him, Stone had to employ the same rage as he did when he killed the rapist before. If Stone is returned, his mission would be considered a failure; therefore, he would remain in Hell and another person would be chosen to return the fugitive souls. The Devil has taunted Stone by reminding him of this and suggesting that certain escapees would be good replacements. However, in "It's a Helluva Life", an angel hints that the reason Stone was selected is because he was the only soul in Hell suitable for the task and for a second chance at life.

Some escapees have other preternatural powers, such as the ability to control the elements or turn invisible. The Devil explains that the longer one spends in Hell, the more Hell becomes a part of them. Even though Stone himself describes them, literally (in the opening narration) as "the most vile creatures", some of the escapees seem to be no more evil than Stone himself. He wears the name and pictographs of these 113 souls as tattoos over his body. As each soul is sent back, their corresponding tattoo disappears in a burning fashion, causing Stone considerable pain.

=== Other characters ===
Among Stone's allies are Maxine (Lori Petty), the woman who owns the hotel where he stays, and Father Cletus Horn (Albert Hall), a blind priest who eventually learns of Stone's mission. Stone occasionally worked with police detectives Ash (Teri Polo) and Fraker (Scott Lawrence). Much of the series' internal conflict was generated by Stone's inability to stay away from his wife, Rosalyn (Stacy Haiduk), who was still alive. Near the end of the season/series, Ash was revealed to be the priestess who engineered the escape from Hell by using her implied romance with the Devil, though he insisted he never loved anyone but God. She also became infatuated with Stone.

== Cast ==
=== Main ===
- Peter Horton as Ezekiel Stone
- John Glover as The Devil

=== Recurring ===
- Lori Petty as Maxine: The front desk clerk of the motel that Stone moves into after relocating to Los Angeles from New York.
- Teri Polo as Detective Sergeant Delilah Ash/Ashur Badaktu: An LAPD officer who takes an interest in Stone, she is eventually revealed to be an ancient Canaanite priestess, and the ringleader of the mass breakout of Hell (implied to have been made successful because she made the Devil fall in love with her). She can control minds, teleport, shapeshift, and summon snakes.
- María Costa as Teresita: A waitress at a diner frequented by Stone.

=== Guest stars ===
- Albert Hall as Father Cletus Horn: A blind Roman Catholic priest who Stone becomes acquainted with while in New York. He later transfers to a new parish in Los Angeles.
- Scott Lawrence as Detective Fraker: Detective Ash's partner in the LAPD, he is unaware of Ash's true nature, and is annoyed by Stone's frequent intrusion into cases.
- Stacy Haiduk as Rosalyn Stone: Stone's wife, she moved to Los Angeles from New York after her husband's death in 1983.

=== The Damned ===
- Father Edward Salinas (Peter Woodward): A psychotic priest who was hanged in 1906 for murdering sixteen boys in Italy, and another eight in New York. He can melt objects by touching them.
- Gilbert Jax (William McNamara): A serial rapist who assaulted Rosalyn Stone in 1983, being murdered two months later by her husband, Zeke. To toy with Stone, the Devil makes it so that Stone is unable to destroy Jax's eyes without feeling the same amount of rage that he did the first time that he killed Jax. Birds fall dead from the sky in his presence, possibly an inverted reference to the song, "(They Long to Be) Close to You".
- Da Ming Po (Roger Yuan): A deranged, purity-obsessed poet who assassinated a princess who spurned his advances during the Tang dynasty. He can telekinetically control fabrics.
- Gwendolyn DuBare (Chad Morgan): A young French maiden who went on a revenge-motivated arson spree after being gang raped in 1458. She can produce extreme heat and flames when agitated or aroused.
- Hasdrabul Skaras (Richard Brooks): A bloodthirsty Carthaginian warrior who wantonly slaughtered, raped and enslaved civilians during the Punic Wars. He can blend in with his surroundings like a chameleon.
- Martin Benedict (Norbert Weisser): A repentant Dutchman who allied with the Nazis during World War II, dying in the Battle of Arnhem.
- Frederick Wilcot Graver (John Hawkes): An overzealous (he once allowed an innocent man to die, having refused to acknowledge his pardon) executioner who died in 1932. He can produce and control electricity.
- Paco Gomez (Jesse Borrego) and Jocelyn Paige (Shannon Sturges): A young couple who died in a car crash after murdering Jocelyn's parents in 1967. Paco has a heart-stopping touch, while Jocelyn's fingertips can generate destructive energy.
- Sally Ann McGee (Alexandra Powers): A vapid party girl and Typhoid carrier, she knowingly exposed hundreds of people to her illness before committing suicide at some point in the 1920s. Her disease, mutated by her time in Hell, is now incurable and instantly fatal, and can even affect other escaped damned souls.
- Brian Reed (Billy O'Sullivan): An abused teenaged boy with dissociative identity disorder, he was shot by police after murdering an elderly man in 1959. He can physically transform into and separate from his alternate personalities, a violent British punk named Vic (Greg Ellis) and a nurturing woman named Tammy (Joanna Canton).
- Joseph Renkmeyer (Steve Durham): A bank robber whose nine month crime spree ended with his dying in a shootout with the police in 1946.

== Episodes ==
Episodes were produced by production order.

No.	Title	Directed by	Written by	Original release date	Prod. code
1	"Pilot"	Félix Enríquez Alcalá	Ethan Reiff & Cyrus Voris	October 23, 1998	296646
2	"Poem"	Félix Enríquez Alcalá	Ethan Reiff & Cyrus Voris	November 20, 1998	467451
3	"Heat"	Jesús Salvador Treviño	Janis Diamond	October 30, 1998	467452
4	"Encore"	Félix Enríquez Alcalá	Scott A. Williams	November 6, 1998	467453
5	"Slayer"	Vern Gillum	Story by : Ethan Reiff & Cyrus Voris; Teleplay by : Angel Dean Lopez	December 11, 1998	467454
6	"Repentance"	Terrence O'Hara	Fred Golan	November 13, 1998	467455
7	"Executioner"	Dan Lerner	Story by : Fred Golan; Teleplay by : Scott A. Williams	December 4, 1998	467456
8	"Ashes"	Larry Carroll	Angel Dean Lopez	December 18, 1998	467457
9	"Lovers"	John Kretchmer	Chris Bertolet	January 8, 1999	467458
10	"Carrier"	Jesús Salvador Treviño	Janis Diamond	January 15, 1999	467459
11	"It's a Helluva Life"	Félix Enríquez Alcalá	Janis Diamond & Scott A. Williams	February 5, 1999	467460
12	"Faces"	Larry Carroll	Fred Golan	January 29, 1999	467461
13	"Mourning After"	Dan Lerner	Story by : Angel Dean Lopez; Teleplay by : Cyrus Voris & Ethan Reiff	February 12, 1999	467462

== Broadcast ==
=== Rerun syndication ===
Since cancellation, Brimstone reruns have aired on Syfy (originally the Sci Fi Channel) in the United States from the summer of 1999 onward. The reruns have no set schedule, but are usually aired in marathons during the channel's seasonal events like "Creatureland", "Inhumanland" and "The 31 Days of Halloween". Chiller also began airing reruns, on July 28, 2007. It currently airs in sporadic weekday marathons, like Syfy, and has no set airing schedule.

=== International ===
Country of Broadcast	Broadcasting Network	Broadcasting Channel	Debut	Finale	Dubbing	Subtitle
Indonesia^{4}	Trans Corp^{4}	Trans TV^{4}	Movie: 12 December 2001^{4} Series: 20 December 2001 (Live); 23 July 2012 (Rerun)^{4}	Series: 12 December 2002 (Live)^{4} 17 August 2012 (Rerun)^{5}	English^{1}^{2}^{3}^{4}	Indonesian^{4}
Malaysia^{1}	Media Prima Berhad^{1}	NTV7^{1}	1 May 2012^{1}	20 July 2012^{1}	English^{1}^{2}^{3}^{4}	
Singapore^{2}	MediaCorp TV^{2}	Channel 5^{2}	1 March 2012^{2}	31 March 2012^{2}	English^{1}^{2}^{3}^{4}	Chinese^{2}^{3}
Hong Kong^{3}	TVB^{3}	TVB Pearl^{3}	28 July 2012^{3}	11 August 2012^{3}	English^{1}^{2}^{3}^{4}	Chinese^{2}^{3}
Hong Kong^{3}	STAR TV	STAR World	21 July 2012	18 August 2012	English^{1}^{2}^{3}^{4}	Chinese^{2}^{3}

Notes:

1. Peninsular Malaysia was delayed telecasts in 2012 with English dubbing and Malay subtitles on every Friday at 11:00 until 12:00 MST.
2. Republic of Singapore was delayed telecasts in 2012 with English dubbing and Chinese subtitles.
3. Hong Kong was delayed telecasts in 2012 with English dubbing and Chinese subtitles.
4. Republic of Indonesia was delayed telecasts in 2001 with English dubbing and Indonesian subtitles. A television movie on every Wednesday was first aired on 12 December 2001 at 19:00 until 21:00 WIB was called "Trans Hollywood" (also known as "TRANSVAGANZA Festival Film Liburan") and television series on every Thursday was first aired on 20 December 2001 until last aired on 12 December 2001 at 22:00 until 23:00 WIB. For Ramadhan it was rerun on every weekday, 23 July 2012 until 16 August 2012 at 09:30 until 10:30 WIB.
5. Beginning with this final episode, the show airs every afternoon. Especially for this episode, the show airs at 12:30 until 14:25 WIB due to Live Proclamation of Indonesian Independence Day with officially raised of the national flag was replaced by the Celebrations of Proclamation of Indonesian Independence Anniversary of 67 years, once during the Proclamation of Indonesian Independence Day on Friday, 17 August 2012 at 09:30 until 11:00 WIB.

== Home media ==
Brimstone was 13th-ranked on TVShowsOnDVD.com's list of unreleased shows until the website closed on May 25, 2018. On September 15, 2008, during a Home Theater Forum chat, Warner Home Video representatives said that "Despite the wonderful work of Peter Horton and John Glover, there are no plans at this time to release Brimstone".
