= The Plane Makers =

British TV drama series (1963–1969)

- title card
- Created by: Wilfred Greatorex
- Starring: Patrick Wymark
- Country of origin: United Kingdom
- No. of series: 3
- No. of episodes: 58

Production
- Running time: 50 minutes
- Production company: ATV

Original release
- Network: ITV
- Release: 14 February 1963 – 12 January 1965

The Power Game
- Created by: Wilfred Greatorex
- Starring: Patrick Wymark
- Country of origin: United Kingdom
- No. of series: 3
- No. of episodes: 39

Production
- Running time: 50 minutes
- Production company: ATV

Original release
- Network: ITV
- Release: 13 December 1965 – 1 April 1969

The Plane Makers is a British television series created by Wilfred Greatorex and produced by Rex Firkin. ATV made three series for ITV between 1963 and 1965. It was succeeded by The Power Game, which ran for an additional three series from 1965 to 1969. Firkin continued as producer for the first two series, and David Reid took over for series 3.

== The Plane Makers ==
The Plane Makers focused on the power struggles between the trades union and the management on the shop floor of a fictional aircraft factory, Scott Furlong Ltd, as well as the political in-fighting amongst the management themselves. Patrick Wymark proved particularly popular as the anti-heroic Managing Director John Wilder, who was "a bully and a boor", who "is forgiven only if he gets results". Wilder's nemesis in the boardroom in the third series was David Corbett (Alan Dobie), though he was supported by his long-suffering wife Pamela (Ann Firbank, standing in for Barbara Murray from series 2), his Sales Director and confidant Don Henderson (Jack Watling) and ever-reliable secretary Miss Lingard (Norma Ronald). In the first two series their task was to manufacture and sell their aircraft, the Sovereign, to an international market. In series 3, Wilder unexpectedly changed strategy to a military VTOL jet aircraft, by taking over the firm of Ryan Airframe.

== The Power Game ==
According to one report, it was on Gretorex's advice that the drama "left the factory floor for the executive suite". At the end of the final Plane Makers series in January 1965, Wilder left Scott Furlong after a project for the Scott-Furlong Predator, a vertical takeoff aircraft, had failed, and took a seat on the board of a merchant bank while also collecting a knighthood. He returned eleven months later in The Power Game. Bored with being a gentleman of leisure, Wilder uses his influence with the bank on whose board he sits to become Joint Managing Director of an established building firm, Bligh Construction. The first two series of The Power Game in 1965–66 chronicled his attempts to keep control in the face of opposition from the company's elderly founder Caswell Bligh (Clifford Evans), a stern, old-school patriarch who resents what he sees as Wilder's imposition on a family firm, and Bligh's ambitious but inexperienced son Kenneth (Peter Barkworth), who would prefer to be sole managing director, and free of his father's influence. Both Henderson and Miss Lingard were back in harness.

Wilder's private life came more to the fore in The Power Game; he has a long-running affair with a civil servant, Susan Weldon (Rosemary Leach), but is aghast when his wife Pamela also plays the field, with engineering expert Frank Hagadan (George Sewell).

The third and final series in 1969 saw Wilder free from Bligh's—but not from Bligh himself—and working for the British government as a 'roving' Foreign Office Ambassador for Trade.

Patrick Wymark died suddenly in 1970 and it was decided not to continue with the series without its most notorious and memorable character.

== Archives Status ==
Only Episode 1 of Series 1 of Plane Makers exists, but series 2 and 3 survive, all as 16mm-film telerecordings. All three series of The Power Game survive as 16mm-film telerecordings.

== Regular cast – The Plane Makers ==
- John Wilder – Patrick Wymark
- Don Henderson – Jack Watling
- David Corbett – Alan Dobie
- Dusty Miller – John Junkin
- Arthur Sugden – Reginald Marsh
- Henry Forbes – Robert Urquhart
- James Cameron Grant – Peter Jeffrey
- Kay Lingard – Norma Ronald
- Pamela Wilder – Barbara Murray, (Ann Firbank some episodes, series 3)
- Laura Challis – Wendy Gifford
- Sir Gordon Revidge – Norman Tyrrell

== Regular cast – The Power Game ==
- Sir John Wilder – Patrick Wymark
- Don Henderson – Jack Watling
- Caswell Bligh – Clifford Evans
- Kenneth Bligh – Peter Barkworth
- Susan Weldon – Rosemary Leach (Series 1-2)
- Justine Bligh – Rachel Herbert (Series 1-2)
- Miss Lingard – Norma Ronald (Series 1-2)
- Lady Wilder – Barbara Murray
- Frank Hagadan – George Sewell (Series 1-2)
- Charles Grainger – Robin Bailey (Series 2)
- Sir Gordon Revidge – Norman Tyrrell
- Sir Jason Fowler – Richard Hurndall (Series 3)
- Lincoln Dowling – Michael Jayston (Series 3)
- Garfield Kane – Barrie Ingham (Series 3)
- Jill (Wilder's secretary) – Deborah Grant (Series 3)

== DVD releases ==
Network has released the following DVD boxsets.

Title	Region	1st Release Date	No# of Discs	Episodes	Extras	Catalog
The Plane Makers – Volume 1	Region 2	2010	4	Series 2 Episodes 1–13	Series 1 episode 1 "Don’t Worry About Me" (only surviving episode from Series 1); Image Galleries; PDF Material	7953275
The Plane Makers – Volume 2	Region 2	21 November 2011	4	Series 2 Episodes 14–28	PDF Material	7953607
The Plane Makers – Volume 3	Region 2	8 April 2013	4	Series 3	Image Gallery	Unknown
The Plane Makers – Collection	Region 2	17 April 2017	12	Series 2 & 3	Series 1 episode 1 "Don’t Worry About Me" (only surviving episode from Series 1); Image Galleries; PDF Material	7954771
The Power Game – The Complete First Series	Region 2	2005	4	13 Episodes	Stills gallery	7952235
The Power Game – The Complete Second Series	Region 2	2006	4	13 Episodes	"Man from Italy" (mute film insert footage); Alternative Main Titles; Promotional Trailers; 35mm title footage (mute)	7952262
The Power Game – The Complete Third Series	Region 2	2007	4	13 Episodes	None	7952736
The Power Game – Series 1–3 – Complete	Region 2	7 July 2008	12	All Episodes	"Man from Italy" (mute); Alternative Main Titles and Promotion; Promotional Trailers; 35mm Title Footage (mute)	7952853
