= The Dangerous Maid =

1923 film by Victor Heerman

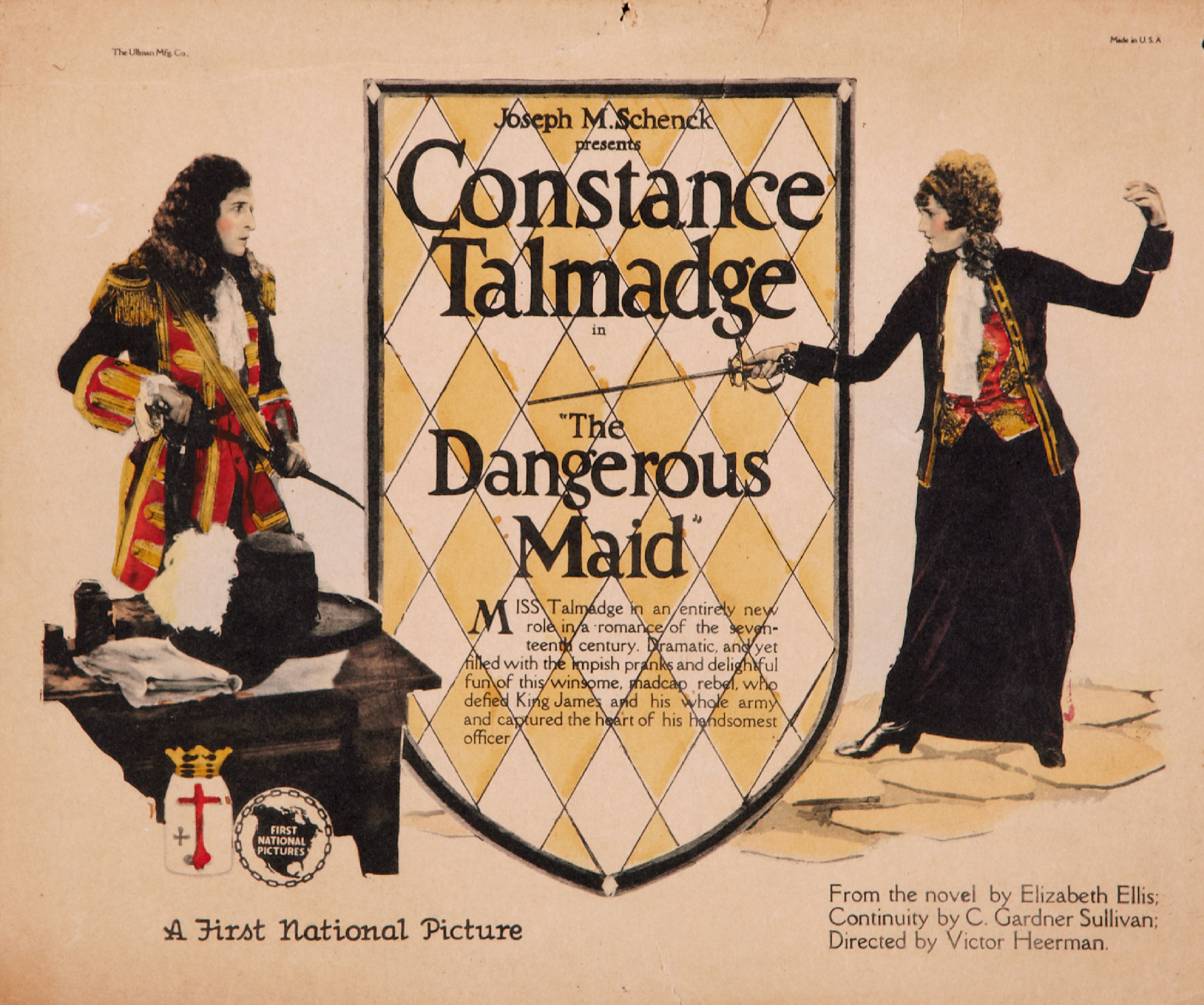
- Lobby card
- Directed by: Victor Heerman
- Written by: C. Gardner Sullivan
- Based on: Barbara Winslow, Rebel by Elizabeth Ellis
- Produced by: Joseph M. Schenck
- Starring: Constance Talmadge; Conway Tearle
- Cinematography: Glen MacWilliams
- Production company: Joseph M. Schenck Productions
- Distributed by: Associated First National Pictures
- Release date: November 19, 1923
- Running time: 80 minutes
- Country: United States
- Language: Silent (English intertitles)

The Dangerous Maid is a 1923 American silent historical comedy-drama film produced and distributed by Joseph M. Schenck Productions and directed by Victor Heerman. Based upon the novel Barbara Winslow, Rebel by Elizabeth Ellis, it was distributed through Associated First National Pictures.

== Plot ==
As described in a film magazine review, the Duke of Monmouth's 1685 rebellion in England fails. Monmouth adherent Barbara Winslow disguises herself to lead his pursuers astray. She falls into the hands of the Royal troops. Later, she obtains documents compromising Judge George Jeffreys, and forces him to sign pardons for all involved.

== Cast ==
- Constance Talmadge as Barbara Winslow
- Conway Tearle as Captain Miles Prothero
- Morgan Wallace as Colonel Percy Kirk
- Charles K. Gerrard as Sir Peter Dare (credited as Charles Gerrard)
- Marjorie Daw as Cecelie Winslow
- Kate Price as Jane, The Cook
- Tully Marshall as Simon, The Peddler
- Louis Morrison as Corporal Crutch (credited as Lou Morrison)
- Phil Dunham as Private Stich
- Otto Matieson as Judge George Jeffreys
- Clarence Wilson as Jewars (Jeffreys' secretary)
- Tom Ricketts as John Standish Lane (credited as Thomas Ricketts)
- Ann May as Prudence Lane
- Ray Hallor as Rupert Winslow
- Lincoln Plumer as The Farmer

== Preservation ==
A print of The Dangerous Maid is preserved in the Library of Congress collection (not in FIAF).
