= Ethan Reiff and Cyrus Voris =

American screenwriters and producers

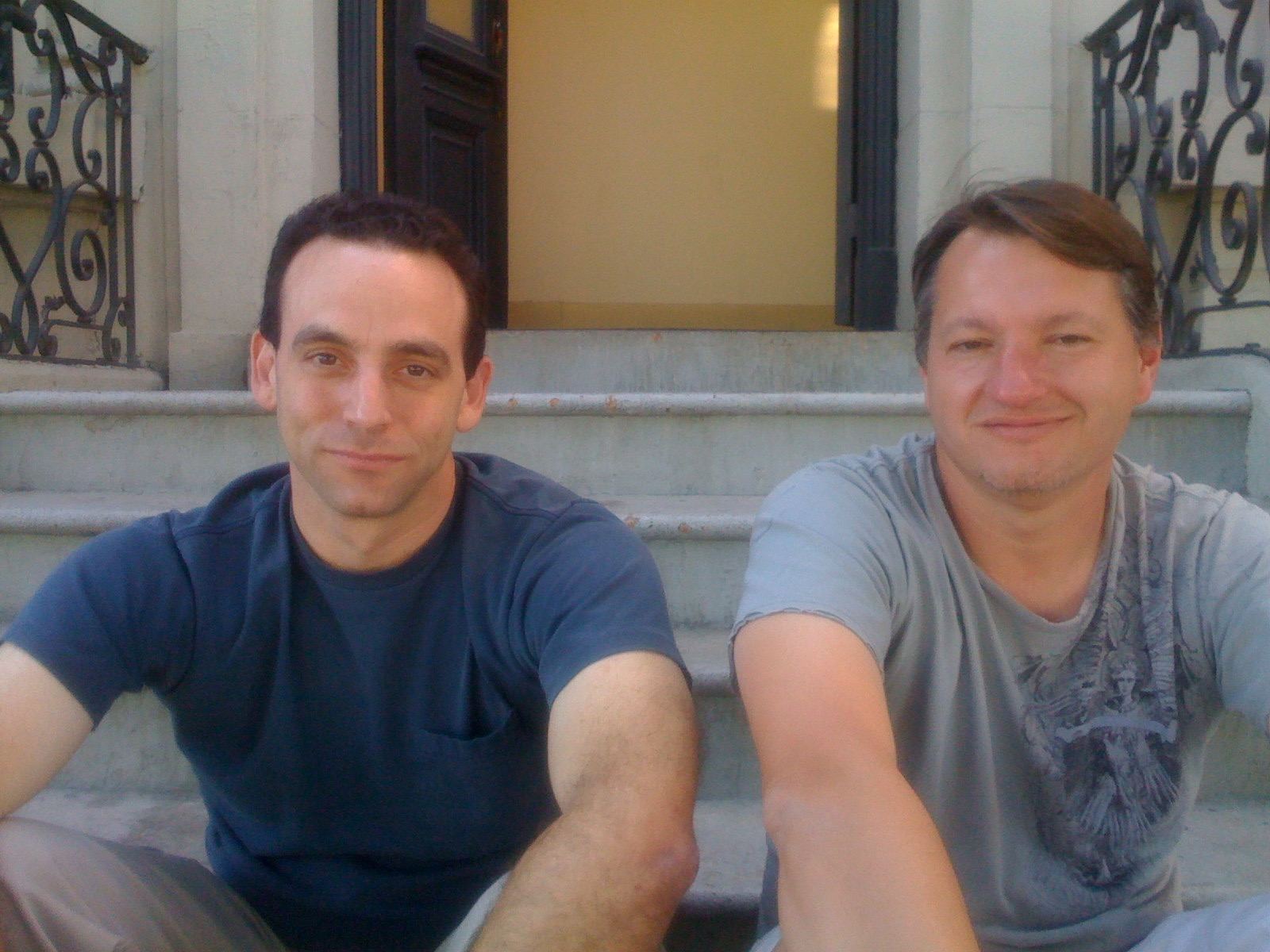
- Occupations: Screenwriter, producer
- Years active: 1987–present

Ethan Reiff and Cyrus Voris are American screenwriters and producers. They are known for their work in both feature films and television.

== Career ==
=== 1980s ===
Reiff and Voris met while both were undergraduates at New York University's Tisch School of the Arts. Beginning in the late 1980s while still based in New York, they wrote – along with Mark Bishop – several scripts including Slayer and Demon Knight. The latter became a popular spec script that saw considerable positive coverage in Hollywood for a number of years.

=== 1990s ===
The duo's first produced efforts came with rewrites on Rafal Zielinski's Under Surveillance (1991), Albert Pyun's Brainsmasher...A Love Story (1993), and the Dolph Lundgren vehicle Men of War (1994).

Demon Knight

Their spec script Demon Knight continued to draw interest from various studios before it was officially picked up by Joel Silver's Silver Pictures and was optioned to be third in a series of three Tales from the Crypt theatrical features. Universal Pictures executives thought the script had more potential than the other two scripts and the movie was quickly sent into production as the inaugural Tales from the Crypt feature with Ernest Dickerson directing. The resulting film, Tales from the Crypt Presents: Demon Knight, was released in the United States in January 1995 and proved to be a box office success for the company, garnering just over $21 million at the domestic box office, earned mixed reviews from critics and over the years became a cult film.

Josh Kirby... Time Warrior!

While Universal was making Demon Knight, the duo were hired as screenwriters by Charles Band's Full Moon Entertainment, where they developed a number of scripts. Their biggest endeavor for the company was Josh Kirby... Time Warrior!, a six-part film series developed for family audiences that followed the titular teen as he journeyed through time. Reiff and Voris created the overall arch of the series and scripted four of the entries themselves.

During this time, the script for Slayer was also optioned and planned as the U.S. film debut for acclaimed Hong Kong film director Ronny Yu. However, after years of development, this film would not come to fruition. The duo also contributed to the development of Freddy vs. Jason. They worked with producer Sean S. Cunningham and delivered several drafts before leaving the project.

Brimstone

During the summer of 1998, it was announced the duo had signed a developmental deal with Warner Bros. Television for a series titled Brimstone. The premise revolved around a dead policeman, played by Peter Horton, who returns to life to collect escaped souls for the Devil, played by John Glover. The show debuted on October 23, 1998, on Fox. The show garnered good reviews and a solid audience, but was cancelled in 1999 after one season. In the ensuing years, it has gained a cult following and is currently ranked number 13 on TvShowsOnDvd.com's list of unreleased shows that should be made available as of September 28, 2017.

During this period they also worked on an unrealized project, Camelot 3000, for Warner Bros. and producer Mark Canton. This was an adaptation of the early 1980s limited comic book series written by Mike W. Barr and penciled by Brian Bolland.

In 1999, the duo wrote and produced the pilot M.K.3 starring Zoe McLellan. A futuristic retelling of the story of The Three Musketeers featuring a female d'Artagnan, the pilot was developed by Warner Bros. Television and Fox, but remains unaired.

=== 2000s ===
Bulletproof Monk

The duo's first produced script of the new millennium was for Bulletproof Monk. The fourth U.S. feature for Hong Kong action star Chow Yun-fat, the film opened in April 2003 and earned $37.7 million worldwide.

Sleeper Cell

In 2004, the duo returned to television with the announcement of a new show called The Cell for Showtime, where they acted as both writers and executive producers. The eventual show, re-titled Sleeper Cell, focused on a group of Islamic terrorists embedding in the U.S. and planning an attack on Los Angeles. The show debuted on December 4, 2005, and lasted for two seasons. The series garnered the duo the highest accolades of their career with over a dozen industry award nominations, including an Emmy nomination for Outstanding Miniseries.

Robin Hood

In 2007, a screenplay from the duo titled Nottinigham was purchased by Universal Studios and producer Brian Grazer in an auction for seven figures. A retelling of the legend of Robin Hood, the script was re-developed and re-written to serve as the basis for the eventual Robin Hood, directed by Ridley Scott and starring Russell Crowe.

Kung Fu Panda

In 2008, the duo saw their biggest commercial success with the DreamWorks Animation family film Kung Fu Panda, based on their original story. As explained by Reiff, the final screenplay was a combined effort: "The story is pretty much exactly the story we wrote. The characters are the characters that we created. But the jokes and all the details came from the two guys from King of the Hill who got the screenplay credit, and they did an amazing job." The film was released in the U.S. in June 2008 and earned $631 million worldwide. The film soon blossomed into a large, successful franchise that includes three theatrical sequels, short films, a television show, and video games.

Also in 2008, the duo were brought on by Warner Bros. Studios and Bruckheimer TV as executive producers of Eleventh Hour. A remake of a UK television series, it ran on CBS from October 9, 2008, to April 2, 2009.

=== 2010s ===
Legends

In 2014, the duo were brought on by Fox 21 Television Studios and TNT to serve as showrunners for the pilot and forthcoming series, Legends starring Sean Bean. Reiff and Voris helped hire the writing staff and ran development, generating multiple episodic stories and teleplays, but left the series prior to production. The pair are credited as contributing writers on the first three episodes.

Knightfall

In 2018, Reiff and Voris joined the History Channel series Knightfall for the second season, which premiers in March 2019. In addition to writing several episodes, they also are Executive Producers on the series.

Developing projects

In 2010, the duo adapted A. Lee Martinez’s 2005 horror comedy novel Gil’s All Fright Diner into a screenplay for an animated feature for Barry Sonnenfield to direct at DreamWorks Animation.

In 2013, the duo sold the pitch and wrote a screenplay adaptation of Daniel Nayeri's short story Wish Police for Reel FX, to be directed by the Spanish animation producing-directing trio known as Headless.

In 2014, the duo again worked with Dreamworks Animation by writing several drafts of Princess Mei Ying and the Eight Immortals, an animation project inspired by the Ancient Chinese folktales of the Eight Immortals.

In 2015, the duo helped sell Vlad, Son of the Dragon – a historical retelling of the story of 15th Century Balkan Prince Vlad Tepes – to A&E Networks and History Channel, and wrote the pilot for the potential series.

== Filmography ==
Film writers

- Under Surveillance (1991)
- Brainsmasher...A Love Story (1993) (Uncredited)
- Men of War (1994)
- Tales from the Crypt Presents: Demon Knight (1995)
- Josh Kirby... Time Warrior! (1995–1996)
- Bulletproof Monk (2003)
- Kung Fu Panda (2008) (Story only)
- Robin Hood (2010) (Story only)

Television

Year	Title	Writers	Creators	Executive Producers
1998	Brimstone	Yes	Yes	Yes
2005–2006	Sleeper Cell	Yes	Yes	Yes
2008–2009	Eleventh Hour	No	No	Yes
2011–2016	Kung Fu Panda: Legends of Awesomeness	No	Yes	No
2014	Legends	Yes	No	Yes
2019	Knightfall	Yes	No	Yes
2019	Bard of Blood	No	No	Yes
2026	House of David	No	No	Yes

Actors

Year	Title	Note
2013	Crystal Lake Memories: The Complete History of Friday the 13th	Documentary film, themself
