= 1990 (TV series) =

British political drama TV series (1977–1978)

- Book cover for paperback novelisation of first series, showing Edward Woodward as Jim Kyle
- Genre: Drama
- Created by: Wilfred Greatorex
- Written by: Wilfred Greatorex; Edmund Ward; Jim Hawkins; Arden Winch
- Directed by: Alan Gibson; David Sullivan Proudfoot; Kenneth Ives; Rob Bird; Peter Sasdy; Roger Tucker
- Starring: Edward Woodward; Robert Lang; Barbara Kellerman (series 1); Lisa Harrow (series 2); Tony Doyle; Clifton Jones (Series 1); Clive Swift (series 2)
- Theme music composer: John Cameron
- Composer: John Cameron
- Country of origin: United Kingdom
- Original language: English
- No. of series: 2
- No. of episodes: 16

Production
- Producer: Prudence Fitzgerald
- Cinematography: Peter Chapman
- Editor: Sheila S. Tomlinson
- Running time: 55 minutes

Original release
- Network: BBC2
- Release: 18 September 1977 – 10 April 1978

1990 is a British then-futuristic political drama television series produced by the BBC and shown in 1977 and 1978.

== Background ==
The series is set in a dystopian future in which Britain is under the grip of the Home Office's Public Control Department (PCD), a tyrannically oppressive bureaucracy riding roughshod over the population's civil liberties.

Dubbed "Nineteen Eighty-Four plus six" by its creator, Wilfred Greatorex, 1990 stars Edward Woodward as journalist Jim Kyle, Robert Lang as the powerful PCD Controller Herbert Skardon, Barbara Kellerman as PCD Deputy Controller Delly Lomas, John Savident, Yvonne Mitchell (in her last role), Lisa Harrow, Tony Doyle, Michael Napier Brown, and Clive Swift.

Two series, of eight episodes each, were produced and broadcast on BBC Two in 1977 and 1978. The series was never repeated but was released on DVD in 2017. Two novelisations based on the scripts were released in paperback by the publisher Sphere; Wilfred Greatorex's 1990, and Wilfred Greatorex's 1990 Book Two.

== Plot ==
Jim Kyle (Edward Woodward) is a journalist on the last independent newspaper, called The Star, who turns renegade and fights the PCD covertly. The officials of the PCD, led by Controller Herbert Skardon (Robert Lang), try to find proof of Kyle's subversive activities. Skardon's two Deputy Controllers are Delly Lomas (Barbara Kellerman), who has an ambiguous relationship with Kyle and Henry Tasker (Clifton Jones). In the second series, the two deputies were replaced by Lynn Blake (Lisa Harrow), a former love interest of Kyle's. (In the novelisation of episodes from Series Two, the explanation given for the replacement of Delly Lomas was that she had been "relegated to obscurity in the Dundee Branch of the PCD"; no explanation is given for Henry Tasker's departure.) Kyle was aided and abetted by Import/Export Agent Dave Brett (Tony Doyle) and provided from time to time with Top Secret government information by the mysterious "Faceless" (Paul Hardwick), who is a top-level government official tapped into the PCD. The government machine is headed by Home Secretary Dan Mellor (John Savident), replaced in office in series two (supposedly through Kyle's efforts) by Kate Smith (Yvonne Mitchell).

== Background ==
Exposition in this series was mainly performed by facts occasionally dropped into dialogue requiring the viewer to piece things together. There was an irrecoverable national bankruptcy in 1981, triggering permanent martial law followed by a general election in which only 20 per cent of the electorate voted (of the few votes, nearly all were for the Neo-Communist Party, whose ideology is a bizarre mix of Maoism, Stalinism, and Syndicalism) . The economy (and imports) drastically contracted forcing stringent rationing of housing, goods and services. These are distributed according to a person's LifeScore as determined (and constantly reviewed) by the PCD on behalf of the union-dominated socialist government. The higher-status individuals appear to be civil servants and union leaders. An exception to this are import–export agents, who appear to be immune to state control due to their importance to the remnants of the economy. The House of Lords has been abolished and turned into an exclusive dining club. State ownership of businesses appears to be close to 100 per cent and prohibition of wealth and income appears to be rigorous. The monarch is male due to the unfortunate death of Elizabeth II but his identity is never made clear.

The currency is the Anglodollar, which is pegged to the Soviet Ruble. The armed forces have been deliberately run down to the extent that they are little more than an internal security force. This is made clear in one episode where the Royal Air Force (RAF) is depicted as consisting of little more than a handful of Harrier jump jets and a few dozen counter-insurgency helicopters. Despite this National Service has been re-introduced (via the Youth Behaviour Control Act 1984 which enforces conscription). The Genetic Crimes Act of 1985 makes sexual offences punishable by death and requires a licence to have children (allegedly to prevent genetic disease). It is said that in 1986 two army generals and a retired air chief marshal attempted a coup against the government but it failed and the plotters faced the firing squad.

Although running the bureaucratic dictatorship, the state appears to shy away from explicit political violence, preferring to set up psychiatric pseudo-hospitals called "Adult Rehabilitation Centres" which employ electro-convulsive treatments to 'cure' dissidents by "scrubbing away" their memories, allowing for false memories to be implanted. Ordinary criminals found guilty of traditional and new economic and social crimes are prevented from clogging up the decaying prison system by having short sentences during which they are force-fed "misery pills" (via a gas mask-like apparatus that holds the mouth open), which induce severe and permanent depression and agony during their incarceration, which eventually leads to suicide. Despite this, fatalities and injuries do occur due to incompetence and the PCD's lack of democratic accountability. These crimes are misreported or ignored by the state media or are suppressed by the print unions on the last independent newspaper in the UK.

The state can also declare a person to be a "non-citizen" which denies them an entitlement to consumer goods, accommodation or food. (This often happens to sex offenders and those found to be involved in religious or right-wing activities.) Labour is controlled by a mandatory closed shop in every workplace. For at least part of the series, the country is on a three-day working week, presumably to conserve energy or to promote full employment through job sharing. Taking a second job ("moonlighting") is illegal, as is "parasitism", defined as claiming state benefits while fit for work. Ombudsman's Courts which are fixed in favour of the state are the key part of the legal system. Emigration is a problem with a steady "brain drain" countered by PCD Emigration officers who try to watch every port and airfield. Professional and skilled labour is fast disappearing from the country in a similar manner to East Germany from 1949 to 1961, before the installation of the Berlin Wall.

== Episodes ==
=== Series 1 (1977) ===
No. overall	No. in series	Title	Directed by	Written by	Original release date
1	1	"Creed of Slaves"	Alan Gibson	Wilfred Greatorex	18 September 1977
2	2	"When Did You Last See Your Father?"	David Sullivan Proudfoot	Wilfred Greatorex	19 September 1977
3	3	"Health Farm"	Kenneth Ives	Edmund Ward	26 September 1977
4	4	"Decoy"	Alan Gibson	Edmund Ward	3 October 1977
5	5	"Voice From The Past"	David Sullivan Proudfoot	Arden Winch	10 October 1977
6	6	"Whatever Happened to Cardinal Wolsey?"	David Sullivan Proudfoot	Wilfred Greatorex	17 October 1977
7	7	"Witness"	Alan Gibson	Wilfred Greatorex	24 October 1977
8	8	"Non-Citizen"	Rob Bird	Edmund Ward	31 October 1977

=== Series 2 (1978) ===
No. overall	No. in series	Title	Directed by	Written by	Original release date
9	1	"Pentagons"	Peter Sasdy	Wilfred Greatorex	20 February 1978
10	2	"The Market Price"	Roger Tucker	Wilfred Greatorex	27 February 1978
11	3	"Trapline"	Peter Sasdy	Edmund Ward	6 March 1978
12	4	"Ordeal by Small Brown Envelope"	Kenneth Ives	Edmund Ward	13 March 1978
13	5	"Hire And Fire"	Alan Gibson	Edmund Ward	20 March 1978
14	6	"You'll Never Walk Alone"	David Sullivan Proudfoot	Wilfred Greatorex	27 March 1978
15	7	"Young Sparks"	Kenneth Ives	Jim Hawkins	3 April 1978
16	8	"What Pleases the Prince..."	Alan Gibson	Wilfred Greatorex	10 April 1978

== Critical Reception ==
In an overview of science fiction programmes broadcast on British television, John Clute gave 1990 a negative assessment: "Intended as a dire warning of the consequences of trade-union socialism, the series' caricatures in fact make the venture risible." .

== DVD release ==
Simply Media released 1990 on DVD in the UK during 2017.

Series no.	Release date
Series 1	20 March 2017
Series 2	1 May 2017

== See also ==
- The Guardians – a similar series broadcast in 1971 about a dystopian Britain set in the 1980s
