= Wilfred Greatorex =

British writer

- Born: Wilfred Glyn Greatorex; 27 May 1921; Liverpool, England
- Died: 14 October 2002 (aged 81); Taplow, Buckinghamshire, England, United Kingdom
- Occupations: Television writer, Screenwriter, script editor, Television producer
- Writing career
- Period: 1959–1982
- Genre: Drama

Wilfred Glyn Greatorex (27 May 1921 – 14 October 2002) was an English television and film writer, script editor and producer.

== Early life ==
Born in Liverpool, he was educated at Queen Elizabeth's Grammar School, Blackburn. After wartime service with the RAF, he became a reporter on The Blackburn Times, The Lancashire Evening Post and Reynold's News. He began his television career at Associated Television.

== Career ==
He was creator of such series as Secret Army, 1990, Plane Makers and its sequel The Power Game, Hine, Brett, Man From Haven and The Inheritors. He also wrote the screenplay for the 1969 film Battle of Britain. He was described by The Guardian newspaper as "one of the most prolific and assured of television script-writers and editors from the 1960s into the 1980s". Starting off as a journalist, he got his big break as a TV writer on Lew Grade's ATV service writing dramas about journalism, such as Deadline Midnight and Front Page Story. He wrote a number of books, including one about the Battle of Arnhem as ghostwriter for Major General Roy Urquhart.

As a TV script editor he also worked on series such as Danger Man and was also creator/producer of The Inheritors, Hine and The Power Game. Papers discovered at a Norfolk auction house in 2011 reveal that 'Hine' had a budget of £84,000, the equivalent of close to £1m some forty years later.

In 1977, he came up with the dystopian drama series 1990 for BBC2, starring Edward Woodward. Greatorex dubbed the series "Nineteen Eighty-Four plus six". Over its two series it portrayed "a Britain in which the rights of the individual had been replaced by the concept of the common good – or, as I put it more brutally, a consensus tyranny." The same year he also devised (with Gerard Glaister) the BBC1 wartime drama Secret Army. The show later inspired the sitcom parody 'Allo 'Allo!.

When talking about his writing style he said "I am opposed to soft-centred characters, which is why I don't create a lot of Robin Hoods. The world's full of hard cases, real villains. And they need to be confronted with other characters just as hard."

His last series for television was Airline in 1982 (starring Roy Marsden). He died in of renal failure in Buckinghamshire in 2002.

== Writing credits ==
Production	Notes	Broadcaster
The Net	"Tender Job" (1962); "A Date with Janie" (1962); "Not for Peanuts" (1962); "Dover Relief" (1962); "The Weekend Fliers" (1962); "Not Wanted on Voyage" (1962)	BBC1
Look at Life	"Look at Life: Men of the Woods" (1963); "Look at Life: High, Wide and Faster" (1963); "Look at Life: Europe Grows Together" (1963); "Look at Life: Draw the Fires" (1963); "Look at Life: Caught in the Cold" (1963); "Look at Life: Back*"room of the Sky" (1963); "Look at Life: The New Australians" (1964); "Look at Life: Off the Sheeps Back" (1964); "Look at Life: Men of the Snowy" (1964); "Look at Life: Constant Hot Water" (1964); "Look at Life: City of the Air" (1964); "Look at Life: The Big Take*"Off" (1966); "Look at Life: School for Skymen" (1966); "Look at Life: Evening Paper" (1966); "Look at Life: Eating High" (1966); "Look at Life: Murder Bag" (1967)	N/A
Taxi!	"Everybody's in: Goodnight!" (1963)	BBC1
The Plane Makers	"A Question of Sources" (1963); "Strings in Whitehall" (1963); "The Island Game" (1964)	ITV
Danger Man	"The Professionals" (1964); "Fair Exchange" (1964)	ITV
The Power Game	"Point of Balance" (1966); "Late Via Rome" (1966); "The Man with Two Hats" (1966); "The Front Men" (1966); "The Chicken Run" (1966); "Safe Conduct" (1966); "One Via Zurich" (1969); "The Outsider" (1969); "The Heart Market" (1969); "The New Minister" (1969); "Mergers" (1969)	ITV
ITV Playhouse	"The Curtis Affair" (1968)	ITV
Nobody Runs Forever	Feature film (1968)	N/A
Man in a Suitcase	"The Boston Square" (1968); "Property of a Gentleman" (1968)	ITV
Battle of Britain	Feature film (1969)	N/A
Big Brother	Television miniseries (1970)	ITV
Hine	13 episodes (1971)	ITV
Love Story	"Night of the Tanks" (1972)	ITV
The Man from Haven	"Pilot" (1972)	ITV
The Frighteners	"You Remind Me of Someone" (1972)	ITV
The Inheritors	6 episodes (1974)	ITV
Oil Strike North	6 episodes (1975)	BBC1
The Mackinnons	"Whose Side Are You On?" (1977)	BBC1
1990	16 episodes (1977–1978)	BBC2
Airline	9 episodes (1982)	ITV

== Books ==
- Greatorex, Wilfred; Fleming, William Ernest (1 January 1957). Diamond Fever, an account of the experiences of William E. Fleming as a diamond prospector in British Guiana. Cassell.
- Urquhart, Major-General Robert Elliott; Greatorex, Wilfred (May 1958). Arnhem. Cassell.
- Greatorex, Wilfred (16 October 1975). The Freelancers. Littlehampton Book Services. ISBN 978-0297770145.
- Greatorex, Wilfred (9 September 1976). Crossover. Littlehampton Book Services. ISBN 978-0297771616.
- Greatorex, Wilfred (February 1977). Three Potato Four. Putnam. ISBN 978-0698107649.
- Greatorex, Wilfred (1977). 1990: Book One. Sphere. ISBN 9780722140093. Based on the BBC television series.
- Greatorex, Wilfred (23 March 1978). 1990: Book Two. Sphere. ISBN 978-0722140017.
- Greatorex, Wilfred (1979). Quicksand. Weidenfeld & Nicolson. ISBN 978-0297774549.
- Greatorex, Wilfred (1 January 1982). Airline, Take Off. Futura Publications. ISBN 978-0708821411. Based on the Yorkshire Television series.
- Greatorex, Wilfred (25 February 1982). Airline, Ruskin's Berlin. Futura Publications. ISBN 978-0708821695.
- Greatorex, Wilfred (4 March 1986). The Button Zone. Signet. ISBN 978-0451141521.
- Greatorex, Wilfred (30 August 1990). Eminent Persons. Weidenfeld & Nicolson. ISBN 978-0297840343.

== Quotes ==
I am opposed to soft-centred characters, which is why I don't create a lot of Robin Hoods. The world's full of hard cases, real villains. And they need to be confronted with other characters just as hard. (The Sunday Times, 1972).
