= Josh Kirby... Time Warrior! =

- VHS cover art for the fifth film
- Directed by: Ernest Farino (1, 5); Frank Arnold (2, 3, 6); Mark Manos (4)
- Screenplay by: Ethan Reiff (1, 2, 5, 6); Cyrus Voris (1, 2, 5, 6); Mark Carducci (as Paul Callisi) (1, 2); Nick Paine (3); Patrick J. Clifton (4)
- Produced by: Charles Band; Debra Dion; Vlad Paunescu; Oana Paunescu
- Cinematography: Viorel Sergovici (1, 2, 5); Vivi Dragan Vasile (1, 2)
- Music by: Richard Band
- Production companies: Moonbeam Entertainment; The Kushner-Locke Company
- Distributed by: Paramount Home Video
- Release dates: 1995 (1-2); 1996 (3-6)
- Countries: United States; Romania
- Language: English

Josh Kirby... Time Warrior! is a direct-to-video film series in six installments which formed one story arc, with the first five films ending with a cliffhanger.

The series produced by Charles Band's Moonbeam Entertainment in association with The Kushner-Locke Company and released by Paramount between 1995 and 1996, featuring the fictional character Josh Kirby played by Corbin Allred. The series was described as in the "tradition of Buck Rogers, Flash Gordon and Captain Marvel".

The series was broadcast on BBC One from 20 to 30 December 1999 and repeated at the end of 2001.

== Premise ==
In the 25th century, humans discover an alien device dubbed the "Nullifier". This device is said to be capable of controlling, or worse, destroying the universe. Irwin 1138 (Barrie Ingham), the second-greatest mind of his time splits the Nullifier into six pieces, which are subsequently dispersed through time. Dr. Zoetrope (Derek Webster), Irwin's rival and the greatest mind of his time, seeks to retrieve and reassemble the device with the help of his time traveling power armor, with Irwin following in his "time pod" to beat his rival to the pieces.

The chase leads them both to 1995, where they encounter 14-year-old Josh Kirby. After a brief conflict, Zoetrope flees into the time stream with a piece of the Nullifier that landed in Kirby's garden, and Irwin gives chase, only to bring Josh along for the ride by accident. Irwin explains the Nullifier is an indestructible weapon he scattered across time to prevent Zoetrope from using it to wipe out the universe. Unable to return to his home era, Josh accompanies Irwin, his alien companion Prism and later, half-human warrior Azabeth Siege (Jennifer Burns), in the race to collect the Nullifier pieces.

== Chapters ==
The story unfolds over the course of six films:

| No. | Title | Directed by | Written by | Original release date |
|---|---|---|---|---|
| 1 | "Planet of the Dino-Knights" | Ernest D. Farino | Paul Callisi, Ethan Reiff and Cyrus Voris | 1995 |
In the 25th century mankind has found a device capable of destroying the universe. Irwin 1138 separates the Nullifier into 6 pieces which he scatters throughout time. When the evil Dr. Zoetrope goes after the pieces, Irwin 1138 must try to stop him, with the help of a 20th century teenager, Josh Kirby, and a half-human warrior named Azabeth Siege. The race is on.
| 2 | "The Human Pets" | Frank Arnold | Paul Callisi, Ethan Reiff and Cyrus Voris | 1995 |
Josh and his friends become pets of a giant alien.
| 3 | "Trapped on Toyworld" | Frank Arnold | Nick Paine | 1996 |
Josh and his friends end up on an alien world that's basically a toyland.
| 4 | "Eggs from 70 Million B.C." | Mark Manos | Patrick J. Clifton | 1996 |
Josh and his friends end up in a planet-sized alien prison.
| 5 | "Journey to the Magic Cavern" | Ernest D. Farino | Ethan Reiff and Cyrus Voris | 1996 |
Josh and his friends free fall to the center of the Earth.
| 6 | "Last Battle for the Universe" | Frank Arnold | Ethan Reiff and Cyrus Voris | 1996 |
Josh Kirby's adventure finally comes to a close as his final confrontantion with Dr. Zoetrope takes place.

== VHS and DVD releases ==
All six chapters have been released on VHS by Paramount Pictures and Moonbeam Entertainment in the United States and DVD by Tango Entertainment, under license from Kushner-Locke.

== Cast ==
- Corbin Allred as Josh Kirby, a 14-year-old boy from 1995 who is dragged into the chase for the Nullifier. He later discovers he's a Time Warrior, capable of superpowered feats, only once every 12 hours.
- Barrie Ingham as Irwin 1138, a scientist from the 25th century, and the "second-greatest" mind of his time period, Dr. Zoetrope being his better. Using his "Time Pod", he engages in a race to find the individual components of the Nullifier before Zoetrope. Along with the Time Pod, he also relies on a cane, which doubles as an energy weapon.
- Jennifer Burns as Azabeth Siege, a half-human warrior who is somehow displaced in time and subsequently joins.
- Derek Webster as Dr. Zoetrope, the greatest mind of his time, exceeding Irwin 1138. While he also seeks the Nullifier, his vehicle of choice is a set of powered armour.
- Steve Blum (credited as David Lucas) as the vocal effects of Prism, an extra-terrestrial creature capable of sensing the pieces of the Nullifier, shown by his glowing, colour-changing hair.

== Reception ==
Professional ratings
Review scores
| Source | Rating |
|---|---|
| Radio Times Guide to Science Fiction | 2/5 stars |

The series was reviewed in the Radio Times Guide to Science Fiction. The series was given a two star rating, which meant that it was considered average and fair.
