= T'ai Fu: Wrath of the Tiger =

1999 video game

- Developer: DreamWorks Interactive
- Publisher: Activision
- Producer: Lyle J. Hall II
- Designer: Noah M. Hughes
- Programmer: Jerome Chen
- Artist: George Chang
- Writer: Scott Langteau
- Composer: Michael Giacchino
- Platform: PlayStation
- Release: UK: March 26, 1999; NA: March 30, 1999
- Genres: Action, platformer
- Mode: Single-player

T'ai Fu: Wrath of the Tiger is a PlayStation game released in 1999, developed by DreamWorks Interactive (which would later be named EA Los Angeles, and finally Danger Close Games) and published by Activision. The game is set in an oriental landscape populated by clans of animals, such as leopards and snakes. The game's protagonist, T'ai Fu, is the last remaining survivor of the Tiger clan and must journey to defeat the Dragon Master and avenge his kind. On the way, he learns about his clouded past and masters several Kung Fu styles, one from each clan master he defeats.

== Gameplay ==
While the game has some fairly challenging platformer aspects, the main focus of the gameplay is on fighting aggressors from other clans as T'ai seeks to receive Kung Fu tutoring from the masters of the clans. Each new style T'ai learns increases his repertoire of moves, and he can even learn more exotic moves such as energy blasts and the power of flight. An emphasis on combos is placed in the fighting, as each new style can be chained to one another in any order, allowing for impressively long and complex chains. The game also rewards players for completing combos, as pressing a specific button at the end of each combo refills a bit of the player's health and 'chi' energy (the latter which is used in performing energy blasts). Another unique aspect of the fighting aspect in the game is that each move learned is not mutually exclusive to combat or platforming; they can be used for both to great effect.

== Development ==
Development was headed by Lyle Hall, best known as the designer of Gex. George Chang served as the lead artist, with Rion Vernon providing the character designs. The soundtrack was composed by Michael Giacchino.

The game used a new revision of the game engine which powered The Lost World: Jurassic Park.

== Reception ==
Reception

Aggregate score
| Aggregator | Score |
|---|---|
| GameRankings | 68% |

Review scores
| Publication | Score |
|---|---|
| AllGame | 2/5 |
| Computer and Video Games | 2/5 |
| Electronic Gaming Monthly | 6/10 4/10 6.5/10 5.5/10 |
| GameFan | 68/100 60/100 70/100 90/100 |
| GamePro | (Note: T'ai Fu: Wrath of the Tiger was rated by GamePro 3.5/5 for graphics, 4/5 for sound, 2/5 for control, and 3/5 for play control.) |
| GameRevolution | D |
| GameSpot | 6/10 |
| Hyper | 89/100 |
| IGN | 7.5/10 |
| PlayStation Official Magazine – Australia | 7/10 |
| PlayStation Official Magazine – UK | 5/10 |
| Official U.S. PlayStation Magazine | 1.5/5 |
| Play | 72% |
| PlayStation: The Official Magazine | 3.5/5 |
