= Beth Ellis =

British novelist and travel writer

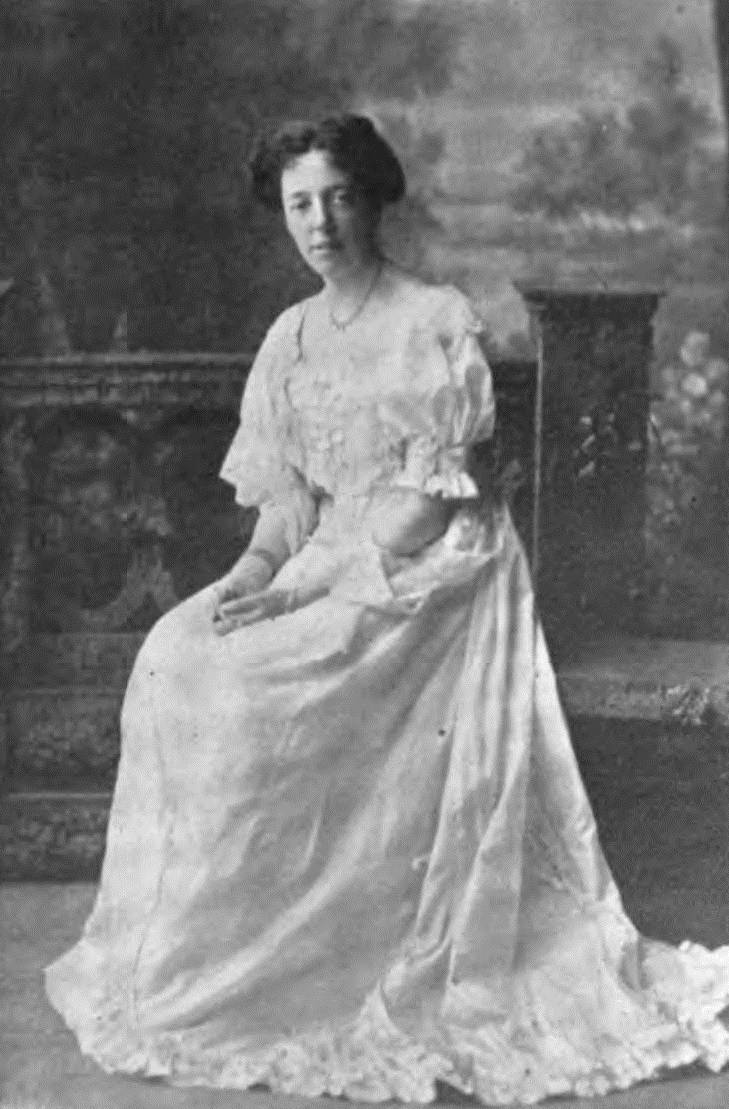
c. 1908

Elizabeth Ellis (1874 – 2 August 1913) was a British novelist and travel writer.

== Biography ==
The daughter of a prominent English solicitor, Ellis was born in the northern town of Wigan, near Manchester, in 1874. She studied English literature at Oxford University in the era before women were permitted to take degrees there. In 1899 she published An English girl's first impressions of Burmah, a humorous account of a recent six-month stay in what is today Myanmar, then part of British India. Six novels and a collection of short stories followed. Most of these books were historical romances. Though she married Godfrey Baker in 1908, Ellis continued to publish under her maiden name until her death in childbirth in Berkhamsted on 2 August 1913.

== Reception ==
Ellis's work met with generally favorable reviews. Assessing her final novel in 1913, the reviewer for The Bookman (London) wrote: "Among present-day writers of historical novels I should place Miss Beth Ellis very highly. There is a swing and a cheerfulness in her writing which are particularly attractive; she has an accurate knowledge of her periods; and her characters are very decidedly not the inhuman puppets of the average of historical fiction." Negative reviews tended to deprecate Ellis's choice of genre, rather than her competence within it. As The New York Times wrote of her fourth novel in 1910: "The book is a good one of its kind. But, of course, some censorious reader will inevitably ask: 'Has not its kind been done to death?'" Today Ellis is remembered chiefly for her book on Burma, described by one authority as "one of the funniest travel books ever written."

== Writings ==
- An English girl's first impressions of Burmah (Wigan, 1899) [travel]
- Barbara Winslow, Rebel (Edinburgh, 1903; New York, 1906) [historical romance]
- Madame, will you walk? (Edinburgh, 1905; Toronto, 1906) [historical romance (short stories)]
- Blind mouths (Edinburgh, 1907) [novel about contemporary social problems]
- The moon of Bath (Edinburgh, 1907; New York, 1908, as "The fair moon of Bath") [historical romance]
- The king's spy (Edinburgh, 1910; New York, 1910, as The girl who won) [historical romance]
- A king of vagabonds (Edinburgh, 1911) [historical romance]
- The king's blue riband (Edinburgh, 1912; New York, 1912) [historical romance]
- "The Kidnapper," Windsor magazine 36 (1912): 505-12 [contemporary romance (short story)]

The British and Canadian editions appeared under the name Beth Ellis, the American ones under the name Elizabeth Ellis.

Selections of Ellis's work have also appeared in the following anthologies:

- Bötefür, Markus, comp. Bei Amazonen, Haremsdamen und Kopfjägern: Westliche Frauen auf Reisen in Südostasien 1851-1952. Gelbe Erde, vol. 7. Gossenberg, 2010.
- Greenwood, Nicholas, comp. Shades of gold and green: Anecdotes of colonial Burmah, 1886-1948. New Delhi, 1998.
- Maurice, William, comp. A pitman's anthology. London, 2004.
- Robinson, Jane, comp. Unsuitable for ladies: An anthology of women travellers. Oxford, 1994.

== Adaptations ==
- The play Mr. Jarvis by Leon M. Lion and M. Cherry was based on Madame, will you walk? and produced at Wyndham's Theatre in London in 1911.
- The silent movie The Dangerous Maid (1923), starring Constance Talmadge, was based on Barbara Winslow, Rebel.

== Translations ==
The travel book An English Girl's First Impressions of Burmah was translated into French under the title Premières impressions d'une jeune Anglaise en Birmanie, complete with notes, a biography of Beth Ellis and a glossary.
