= Mormon cinema =

Films with themes surrounding Mormonism

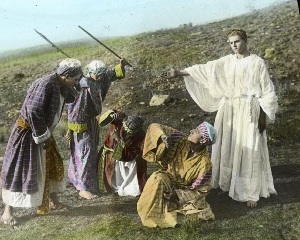
Still from The Life of Nephi (1915)

Mormon cinema usually refers to films with themes relevant to members of the Church of Jesus Christ of Latter-day Saints (LDS Church). The term has also been used to refer to films that do not necessarily reflect Mormon themes but have been made by Mormon filmmakers. Films within the realm of Mormon cinema may be distinguished from institutional films produced by the LDS Church, such as Legacy and Testaments, which are made for instructional or proselyting purposes and are non-commercial. Mormon cinema is produced mainly for the purposes of entertainment and potential financial success.

Though Latter-day Saints have been involved in the film industry in various ways since the early 20th century, independent Mormon cinema is a relatively new phenomenon. Many scholars and filmmakers accredit Richard Dutcher's 2000 film God's Army with ushering in the modern Mormon cinema movement. Following the commercial success of Dutcher's film, Mormon producers and directors began to market distinctly Mormon movies to LDS audiences, especially those living in the Mormon Corridor. This began with a wave of Mormon comedy movies, such as The Singles Ward (2002) and The R.M. (2003), that focused on the more comedic aspects of the culture surrounding the religion. Films within the Mormon cinema subgenre typically rely heavily on LDS themes and are marketed mostly toward Latter-day Saints, though there has been an effort to "cross over" into more general topics and appeal to a wider audience. Generally, Latter-day Saints produce and direct the films. Over the years, Mormon cinema has explored a variety of production methods: widespread commercial release, single-theatre release, and direct-to-DVD release.

Production of Mormon films has slowed since the early 2000s, but those in the niche industry continue to release movies covering distinctly LDS topics, such as Mormon missionaries and LDS Church history. Theological elements, such as man's ability to be close to God, remain present in Mormon films.

== Defining "Mormon cinema" ==
There is debate surrounding what should and should not be classified as "Mormon cinema." For example, Don Bluth's animated films, such as The Land Before Time (1988) and Anastasia (1997), carry some themes and undertones that coincide with the director's religion but lack overtly LDS characteristics. Preston Hunter, one of the creators of ldsfilm.com, limits the definition of Mormon cinema to films released commercially. They must be made, according to Hunter, by members of the church, and feature "overtly Latter-day Saint characters or themes." This definition would exclude Brigham Young (1940) because its director, Henry Hathaway, was not a member of the church. That film, however, harbored obvious Mormon aspects; church leaders at the time even had a hand in its production. In the absence of definite criteria, the definition of Mormon cinema often shifts to reflect whatever is included in the annual LDS Film Festival.

== History ==
=== Early 20th-century Mormon films ===
Prior to the advent of filmmaking, a major shift occurred in the LDS Church from isolationism to a period of growth. In the 1890s, the practice of plural marriage ended, and Utah became a U.S. state. This context provided Mormons with a reason to begin making films once the technology presented itself; they wanted to portray contemporary Mormonism to a wide audience. The church produced institutional films shortly after the industry was born. Independently, however, Latter-day Saints were somewhat hesitant to adopt filmmaking as a method of storytelling. The early 20th-century leaders of the LDS Church warned members against the potentially detrimental effects of cinema on society. However, the abundance of sensationalist pictures with anti-Mormon themes during the silent film era resulted in the desire on the part of Mormons to combat these portrayals with their own. By 1913, an article in The Young Woman's Journal, a Latter-day Saint publication, declared that the new medium of film would "help the world at large to an understanding of our [Mormon] history." Subsequently, the 1920s saw a boom in theater construction in Utah and the number of Mormon moviegoers. By the 1930s and 40s, movies had become key component of Latter-day Saint life. Lester Card's Corianton: A Story of Unholy Love (1931) was the first film within the Mormon niche to be commercially released, though it disappointed both audiences and investors. Twentieth Century Fox's Brigham Young (1940) was much more successful; a celebration was held in Salt Lake City on the film's release date, and Brigham Young became the film with "the largest premiere in American history to that point."

==== Silent film era ====
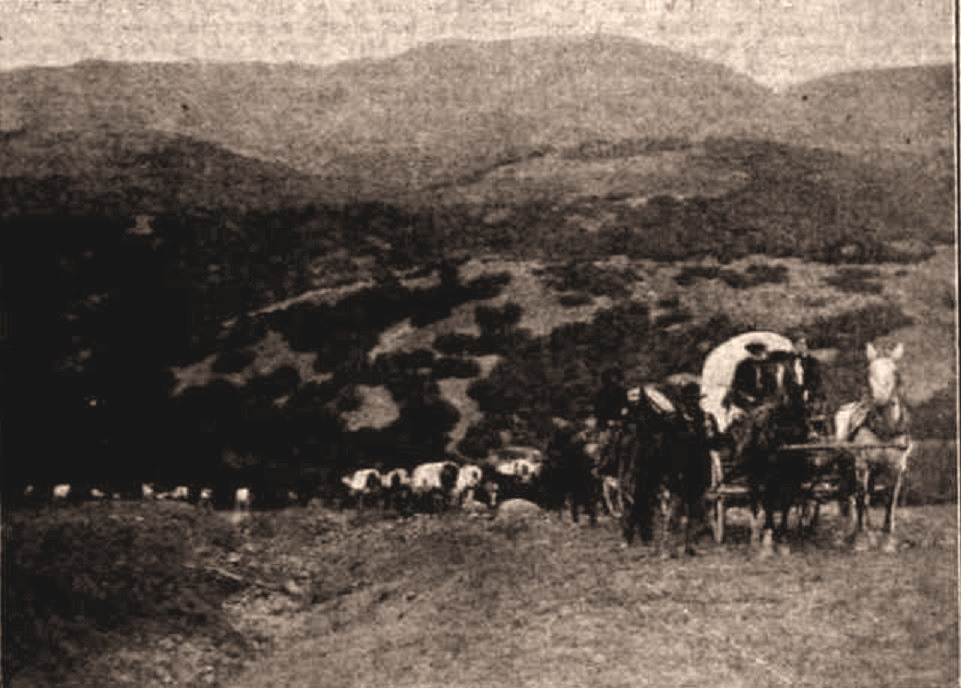
Still from One Hundred Years of Mormonism (1913)

Between the years 1905 and 1915, nineteen known movies portraying Mormonism were produced. These were not, however, made by Latter-day Saints; many were lurid tales of hypnotic missionaries and Western pioneer stories with storylines revolving around massacres or kidnappings. The LDS church worked with LDS and non-LDS directors alike to create films that painted the history of Utah and Mormonism in a more positive light, but "harsh depictions" of Mormons—such as those in A Victim of the Mormons (1911), A Mormon Maid (1917), and Trapped by the Mormons (1922)—overshadowed those church-produced films—such as One Hundred Years of Mormonism (1913) and The Life of Nephi (1915)—in the market. In 1930, however, the adoption of the Motion Picture Production Code (MPPC) required gentler treatment of religious subject matters; it prohibited films that featured "the ridicule of religious denominations, their leaders, or adherents." Thus, the production of anti-Mormon silent films slowed to a halt.

One Hundred Years was considered a large-scale production for its time; it was 90 minutes long and involved "a cast of over a thousand, an elaborate reconstruction of sections of [the city of] Nauvoo, and four concurrently running cameras". It told in detail the story of the LDS Church, beginning with the birth of its founder, Joseph Smith, and constituted one hundred scenes. In the realm of Mormon cinema, One Hundred Years of Mormonism "remains the single most important commercial film release of the silent cinema," mainly because of its being directly influenced by people who themselves had been Mormon pioneers. It was shown in theaters worldwide; cinemas in Buenos Aires, Sydney, Peking, Berlin, St. Petersburg, Paris, and London requested reels. Only a few minutes of the film survive today.

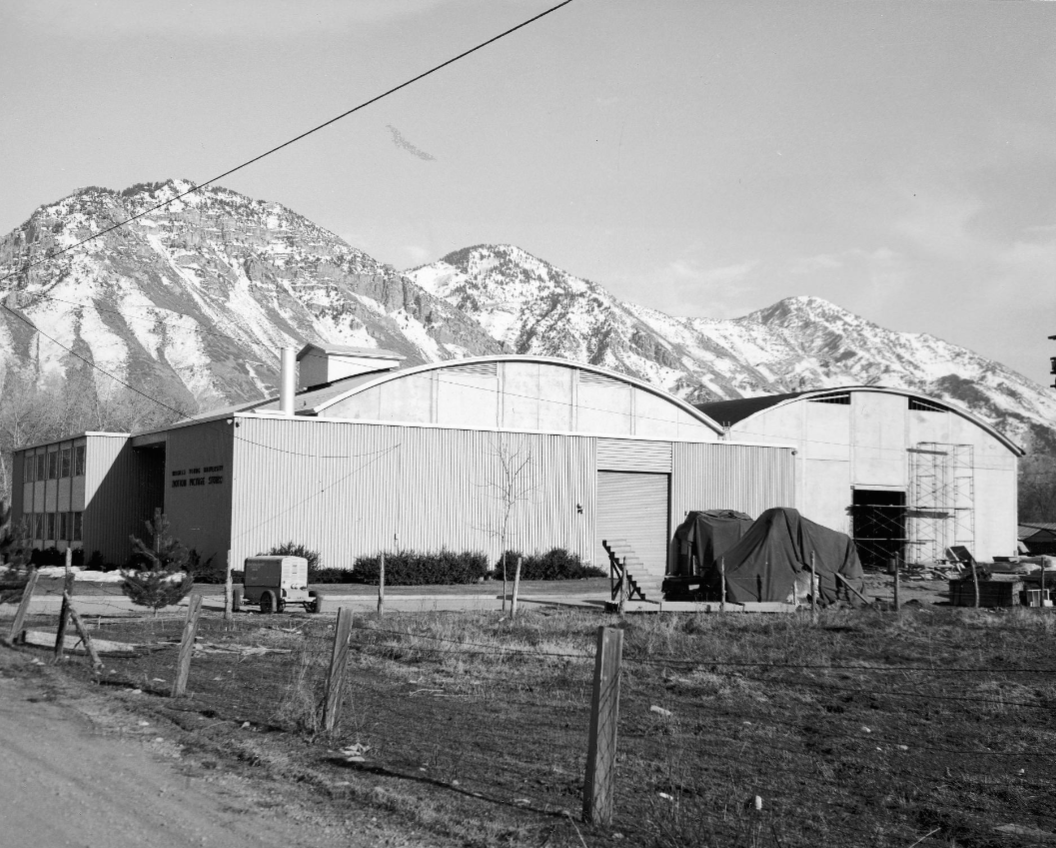
BYU Motion Picture Studio, ca. 1959

From 1916 to 1929, brothers Shirley and Chester Clawson made the first documentary-style films for the church. They recorded segments of the church's semiannual General Conference, shots of LDS landmarks (such as Temple Square), and scenes from the everyday lives of general authorities of the church. Most of their work was destroyed in a fire in 1929.

=== Growth and development, 1958–2000 ===
In the 1950s, the Brigham Young University (BYU) Motion Picture Department was created, and in 1958 it grew into the BYU Motion Picture Studio (BYU MPS). This was a major step towards greater autonomy for the Mormon cinema industry; though most of the work produced at the BYU MPS was non-commercial and church-produced, it paved the way for the creation of independent Mormon cinema. Overall, the LDS film industry became much more established from the 1950s-70s under the influence of David O. McKay and Wetzel Whitaker. In 1978, Spencer W. Kimball called for Mormon filmmakers to create "masterpiece[s] which would live forever."

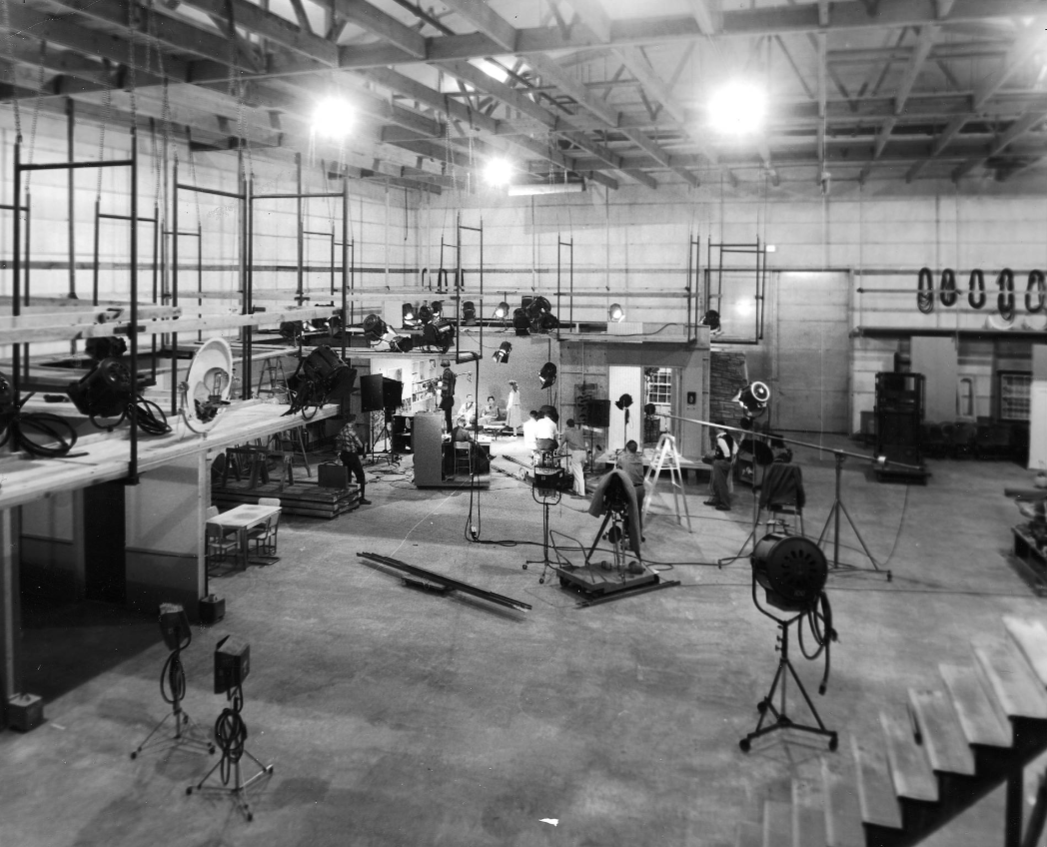
BYU MPS sound stage, ca. 1950s

The range of years from 1973 to 2000 has been called the "Mass Media Era" in Mormon cinema. Particularly in the years before the internet, the church encouraged its members to look to its "correlated"—that is, church-produced—films and filmstrips for information and faith-building entertainment. The films produced during this time mostly fit into that category; they were products of the church itself, not of its members independently. However, a growing number of Latter-day Saints began to work in the entertainment industry.

=== The birth of modern Mormon cinema: 2000-2006 ===
In more recent decades, Mormon-made and -themed films produced neither by the church nor by big Hollywood film studios have garnered recognition among LDS audiences. The Mormon cinema movement began in 2000, when director Richard Dutcher realized the potential for a Mormon niche within the film industry and commercially released God's Army, a movie depicting LDS missionaries in Los Angeles. He wanted to improve the way Mormon characters were portrayed on screen. The film, which was produced on a budget of $300,000, grossed upwards of $2.5 million at the box office. God's Army was unique for the time in that it combined a number of unfamiliar factors: an LDS director, an LDS subject matter, a theatrical distribution, and a marketing campaign that targeted Mormon moviegoers. It earned Dutcher the title of "the father of modern Latter-day Saint cinema." God's Army's release marked a major shift in the subgenre; it was not the first widely shown Mormon film, but it demonstrated the viability of such a film achieving relative commercial success.

==== Mormon comedies ====
Observing the financial success of God's Army, Kurt Hale and Dave Hunter founded Halestorm Entertainment in 2001 and focused the new company's efforts on making and distributing Mormon movies. Halestorm began releasing slapstick comedies with Mormon-centric humor in the early 2000s, including titles such as The R.M. (2003), The Home Teachers (2004), Baptists at Our Barbecue (2004), Sons of Provo (2004), and Mobsters and Mormons (2005). The company kept production costs low by filming in its home state of Utah or in nearby Arizona or Idaho. Alongside Halestorm, Excel Entertainment (founded by former Disney executive Jeff Simpson) and Zion Films have spearheaded the production and distribution of Mormon cinema.

Films that rely heavily on the viewers' understanding of LDS vocabulary, social norms and self-deprecating cultural humor rarely find success among general audiences. This was true of satirical comedies The Singles Ward (2002), The R.M., and The Home Teachers. Singles Ward, branded "the first major LDS comedy," focuses on a subgroup of Mormon culture: young adults in Utah Valley searching for future spouses. In a discussion of these comedies, screenwriter and director Randy Astle writes that "many of the jokes and references [are] incomprehensible for Church members as close as Idaho, let alone India." The films also tended to lack depth, "[poking] fun at the faith without offering much insight." Director Richard Dutcher and reviewers Sean P. Means and Thomas Baggaley responded to the early 2000s' wave of Mormon films by expressing concern over the way the subgenre was headed. They worried about directors and production companies relying too heavily on Mormon-centric humor and the newness of Mormon cinema instead of producing quality films with worthwhile plotlines. These movies did, however, prove to be popular among Latter-day Saint audiences. Terryl Givens, associate professor of English, attributes this success to the desire of Mormon audiences to see their own "distinctive eccentricities" represented on the screen. He writes: "The popularity of these comedic films seems in part to derive from a people hungry for entertainment that validates their own cultural specificity. Like insiders to a private joke, Mormons can comfortably laugh at a genre that ... promotes Mormon cohesion and reifies and confirms Mormon self-definition." In an interview, Will Swenson, director of Sons of Provo, stated that "representation matters. People want to see themselves on-screen. And there are a ton of Mormons out there." However, by 2006, Halestorm discovered that the enthusiasm for Mormon-centric movies had died down. The niche was too new to support the many films that were being produced for it. So, Halestorm pivoted by rebranding a part of itself as "Stone Five Studios" and releasing its next comedy, Church Ball (2006), with less references to religion and Mormon culture. Richard Dutcher released a follow-up to God's Army, States of Grace, in 2005, but some Mormon moviegoers disapproved of the film for its "not altogether positive depiction of Mormons." In 2006, author Dean C. Hale proposed that most Mormons simply do not take an interest in Mormon cinema. This, he said, may be related to the LDS Church encouraging its members to prioritize other aspects of life—such as family—before entertainment.

==== Efforts at mass appeal and growth ====
LDS film directors have been attempting to appeal to a national audience since the early 2000s. The 2003 crossover film Pride & Prejudice: A Latter-day Comedy, for example, avoided direct references to Mormonism. Its director, Andrew Black, sought to focus on other elements of the story, with Mormon culture as "just a backdrop." Professor Travis T. Anderson argues that LDS films revolving around universal human themes—such as "challenges, struggles, desire, and day-to-day experiences"—with just a splash of religious undertones achieve success in the movie market despite the Mormon cultural aspects they carry, which can seem strange to general audiences. He cites The Other Side of Heaven (2001), Saints and Soldiers (2003), Napoleon Dynamite (2004), and New York Doll (2005) as examples of such "critical and financial success stories in Mormon cinema." Saints and Soldiers gained recognition at multiple small film festivals; and the 2001 murder mystery Brigham City, while not praised by audiences, received critical acclaim. The documentary New York Doll tells the story of a member of a rock band—who also happens to be Mormon—and the reconciliation of his two worlds. It demonstrates the commonly held goal of Mormon filmmakers to bridge the gap between how Mormons are perceived and the concept of the typical American. Larry Miller, owner of the Utah jazz, invested millions of dollars into producing The Work and the Glory (2004) in an effort to tell the story of the history of the LDS Church. Mormon filmmakers have often made the argument that films with distinctly Mormon characteristics have the potential to appeal to general audiences. Additionally, LDS films have been featured in theaters around the United States. Mormon cinema has also been the subject of aesthetic discussion. Doc Films, a student film society at the University of Chicago, hosted a Mormon film series in 2007.

Some Mormon films were marketed differently to the larger market than they were to their niche audience. The national release DVD cover of Brigham City, for example, featured "much more implied violence" than the cover released to the Mormon Corridor. When new films were released, their launch was often accompanied by the creation of a website dedicated to promoting the film. Most of the family-oriented films marketed to Mormon audiences never made it to theaters, but went right to DVD distribution through large and small e-commerce websites, such as Amazon and LDSVideoStore.com. Deseret Book Company and Seagull Book were at the forefront of Mormon DVD distribution. In general, the most successful Mormon films were those made with high-quality equipment and distributed by an entertainment company, such as Halestorm or Excel Entertainment.

As the Mormon film industry blossomed, so did commentary and criticism. In 2000, the Association for Mormon Letters created a film category for its AML Awards. That same year, Preston Hunter and Thomas Baggaley created ldsfilm.com, which became the central hub for discussions and announcements concerning Mormon cinema. The site provided a place for "a Mormon film community" to form, helping visitors stay apprised of upcoming LDS movies. Then in 2001, the first LDS Film Festival was held in Provo, Utah. Attendance more than doubled at the event's fifth year. The modern Mormon cinema movement was large enough to spawn celebrities, such as Kirby Heyborne, within the Mormon community. As of 2009, there were 4,591 entries of film or television shows in the Mormon Literature and Creative Arts Database. The term "Mollywood"—a portmanteau of "Mormon" and "Hollywood"—was used to describe the films of this era.

== Present day ==
Eric Samuelsen, associate professor of theatre and media arts, has noted that "many [LDS] films from 2005 onward have performed so poorly at the box office that the movement seems to have lost at least some of its momentum." In 2014, LDS actor Jim Bennett wrote in a Deseret News article that "the hunger [for LDS films] is still there but the novelty has worn off." Some scholars have argued that the quality of LDS cinema has plateaued due to both directors and audiences "ascertain[ing] what is morally wrong in films they see, and remain[ing] uninterested in seeking out, discriminating, or creating what is right (morally or aesthetically) in film." Publications such as BYU Studies Quarterly, Irreantum, Sunstone, and Dialogue: A Journal of Mormon Thought have featured criticism of LDS cinema. The Mormon blogosphere (sometimes referred to as the "bloggernacle") has also contributed film reviews over the years.

Mormon filmmakers have continued to produce movies centered around LDS missionaries, but often from new perspectives; The Saratov Approach (2013) was a thriller set in Russia, The Errand of Angels (2008) focused on female missionaries, and Freetown (2015) told the story of African missionaries escaping the First Liberian Civil War. On the subject of film, author Heather Bigley writes: "As American members [of the LDS Church] begin to think of themselves as part of a world-wide organization, efforts at self-definition abound." There have also been recent releases in the vein of LDS Church history, such as The Fighting Preacher (2019) and Out of Liberty (2019). The Mormon films released since 2005 have mainly been small, independent features. They are, however, arguably of a higher artistic quality than their predecessors, and tend to have a "moral of the story." There has arguably been more variety in Mormon cinema in more recent years. In March 2021, LDS filmmaker Barrett Burgin argued that films made by and about Latter-day Saints still have the potential to be marketable to a larger audience, but stressed the need to prioritize storytelling over a missionary message. He also identified some elements of LDS doctrine, culture, history, and lore—such as polygamy, violence, buried treasure, folk magic, and miracles—as marketable film elements. These, he said, range from "radically weird" to "clean-cut and conservative," and the intrigue surrounding that dichotomy could attract the interest of viewers.

The LDS Film Festival is still held annually in Orem, Utah, usually around the same time as the Sundance Film Festival. The 2020 festival commemorated 20 years of Mormon cinema: 20 years, that is, since the release of Richard Dutcher's God's Army, the film credited with starting the movement. The subgenre has become an important part of cultural expression for Latter-day Saints. Director and screenwriter Randy Astle has argued that, "along with music and temple architecture, [film] is the most prominent Mormon art form". LDS films are commonly made in the Rocky Mountains, New England, New York City, and Los Angeles.

== MPAA ratings ==
One aspect of the culture of LDS cinema is heightened concern over MPAA film ratings. Many members of the Church generally view R-rated films as taboo, but Latter-day Saints provide a substantial market for G- and PG-rated films. For example, a movie theater in Sandy, Utah was home to the highest attendance for viewings of Harry Potter and the Chamber of Secrets; and, as of 2011, Latter-day Saints constituted 69% of Utah's population. R-ratings are rare among Mormon-made films; they have been described as having "a 1950s sensibility about them."

== Selected notable companies ==
- Excel Entertainment Group
- Halestorm Entertainment

== Selected filmography ==
=== Drama ===
- Brigham Young (1940) – Follows the story of Brigham Young after Joseph Smith's death.
- Bad Bascomb (1946) – Two outlaws hide out in a Mormon wagon and one of them befriends a little girl.
- Wagon Master (1950) – Forced out of Crystal City, a group of Mormons head west in search of the promised land.
- Paint Your Wagon (1969) – Two unlikely prospectors share the same wife in a Californian mining town.
- Messenger of Death (1988) – A film about an attempt by a water company to start a family feud among fundamentalist Mormons to take the family's land for the company.
- God's Army (2000) – The first general release, modern Mormon cinema film, about LDS missionaries; directed by Richard Dutcher.
  - God's Army 2: States of Grace (2005) – A sequel to God's Army, by Richard Dutcher
- Brigham City (2001) – A murder mystery, also by Dutcher.
- The Other Side of Heaven (2001) – Based on John H. Groberg's experiences in Tonga as an LDS missionary, as documented in his memoir In the Eye of the Storm.
  - The Other Side of Heaven 2: The Fire of Faith (2019) – Sequel to The Other Side of Heaven.
- The Book of Mormon Movie, Vol. 1: The Journey (2003) – An ambitious film about the Book of Mormon, which was the fourth highest-grossing movie in LDS cinema.
- The Best Two Years (2003) – An LDS missionary's experience in the Netherlands, based on the play The Best Two Years of My Life.
- Saints and Soldiers (2004) – A World War II movie that has muted LDS overtones and significant mainstream appeal.
  - Saints and Soldiers: Airborne Creed (2012) – sequel
  - Saints and Soldiers: The Void (2014) – sequel
- The Work and The Glory (2005) – Based on Gerald Lund's LDS and historical fiction series The Work and the Glory.
  - The Work and The Glory II: American Zion (2005) – sequel
- The Errand of Angels (2008) – The experiences of a female LDS missionary from Idaho serving in Austria.
- Emma Smith: My Story (2008) – The story of Joseph Smith's wife, Emma. Based upon the true story of her life.
- Forever Strong (2008) – Will rugby reunite a broken family?
- 17 Miracles (2011) – The story of numerous miracles that occur to the Willie Handcart Company. The main character is Levi Savage who joins and supports the company despite serious misgivings about their unpreparedness and late start.
- Ephraim's Rescue (2013) – The story of Ephraim Hanks who was one of the first rescuers to leave Salt Lake City to help save the stranded Willie and Martin handcart companies.
- The Saratov Approach (2013) – Based on the true story of two missionaries kidnapped and held for ransom while serving LDS missions in Russia in 1998.
- Freetown (2015) – based on the true story of a group of native Liberian missionaries traveling from Monrovia, Liberia to Freetown, Sierra Leone during a time of civil war in 1990.
- The Cokeville Miracle (2015) – based on the true story of the Cokeville Elementary School hostage crisis and the miraculous spiritual experiences that happened there.
- Spirit of the Game (2016) – based on the true story of the Mormon Yankees, an American basketball team which played in exhibition games before the 1956 Summer Olympics.
- The Fighting Preacher (2019) – The story of Willard and Rebecca Bean who are sent to settle in Palmyra, New York to establish a LDS church presence and buy the Hill Cumorah. They are initially shunned by the local townspeople, but over the years gradually gain their deep respect and love.
- Out of Liberty (2019) – the individuals surrounding Joseph Smith's captivity in Liberty Jail in 1839.

=== Romance ===
- Saturday's Warrior (1989) – popular release among Latter-day Saints of the De Azevedo and Stewart musical, directed by Bob Williams. De Azevedo released a remake of the movie in 2016.
- Out of Step (2002) – a young dance student leaves Utah for schooling in New York City. She falls in love with two different men and must choose between them.
- Pride and Prejudice: A Latter-Day Comedy (2003) – a modern adaptation of the Jane Austen novel Pride and Prejudice, set in Provo, Utah.

=== Comedy ===
Several comedies, mostly produced by Dave Hunter, have also been released. Because the humor of these films often relies on specifically Utah-centric Latter Day Saint culture, they tend to have a smaller audience than the other LDS subgenres, even among Mormon viewers.

- The Singles Ward (2002) – The title refers to an LDS congregation (ward) composed only of single adults. A comedy with romantic aspects.
- The R.M. (2003) – About the experiences of a returned missionary.
- The Best Two Years (2003) – LDS missionaries' experiences in the Netherlands, based on the play The Best Two Years of My Life.
- The Work and the Story (2003) – A mockumentary about LDS cinema when Richard Dutcher (fictionally) disappears. Written, produced and directed by Nathan Smith Jones; co-produced by Miriam Smith.
- The Home Teachers (2004) – Slapstick comedy about polar opposite home teachers that "fulfill" their responsibility on the last day of the month. "Home teaching" is the LDS practice of a home teaching companionship – a holder of the Melchizedek Priesthood and a 14-year-old teacher or older – visiting and teaching families in their ward each month.
- Baptists at Our Barbecue (2004) – Longfellow – consistently called "Longwinded" by the inhabitants – is a small town that is religiously divided equally between Baptists and Mormons. A newcomer becomes the tie-breaker. Rather than tilt the scales he decides to bridge the religious divide by organizing an all-faiths barbecue. Based on a novel by Robert Farrell Smith.
- Sons of Provo (2004) – Mockumentary about an LDS boy band named Everclean.
- Mobsters and Mormons (2005) – After testifying against his mob boss, Carmine "The Beans" Zindelli Pasquale and his family are put in the Witness Protection Program in "Happy Valley", Utah, resulting in significant culture clash.
- Church Ball (2006) – In the last year of a basketball league, a church team does not want to place last again. The storyline juxtaposes the desire to win at all costs with the expectation of sportsmanlike conduct in church sports.
- Believe (2007) – A mockumentary about multi-level marketing.
- Inspired Guns (2014) – Two Mormon missionaries begin teaching two members in the mafia in a case of mistaken identity.
- Once I Was a Beehive (2015) – A non-LDS girl attends Young Woman's camp.
- Trek: The Movie (2018) — a group of LDS teens participate in a reenactment of the handcart pioneers.

=== Fantasy/adventure ===
- The Legend of Johnny Lingo (2003) – follow on to the classic short film.
- Passage to Zarahemla (2007) – A time-travel adventure set in the rural area of Leeds, Utah wherein characters from modern times interact with Nephites and Gadianton robbers (tribes and groups mentioned in the Book of Mormon).
- 17 Miracles (2011) – Based on accounts of the pioneers of the Willie and Martin handcart companies struggling to survive to head to the Great Salt Lake Valley while a multitude of miracles occur.

=== Documentary ===
- American Mormon (2005) – A small film crew drove across the United States interviewing people about their perceptions of Mormons.
- New York Doll (2005) – A recovering alcoholic and recently converted Mormon, Arthur "Killer" Kane, of the rock band The New York Dolls, is given a chance at reuniting with his band after 30 years.
- American Mormon in Europe (2006) – Interviews with people in Europe about their perceptions of Mormons, and interviews with European church members.
- Trouble In Zion (2009) – A tragic piece of American religious history is brought to life through the spoken word, folk music, and the vibrant pages of a comic book.
- 8: The Mormon Proposition (2010) – "A scorching indictment of the Mormon Church's historic involvement in the promotion & passage of California's Proposition 8 and the Mormon religion's secretive, decades-long campaign against LGBT human rights."
- Meet the Mormons (2014) – A documentary examining the very diverse lives of six devout members of the Church of Jesus Christ of Latter-day Saints (actually an official church production, but included here because it was shown in theaters).
- Believer (2018) – Documentary of Imagine Dragons' lead singer, the loveloud music festival, and Latter-day Saint queer folk.

=== Television ===
- Bonanza (1959–1973) – Season 8, Episode 4: "The Pursued" (1966).
- The Joseph Smith Papers (2008–2009) – Documentary television series which documented the creation of, and work involved in, Joseph Smith Papers Project.
- History of the Saints (2010) – Documentary television series which focuses on the history of the Latter-day Saints after the death of Joseph Smith, including their exodus to Utah.
- Hell on Wheels (2011–2016) – Western television series which focuses on the building of the Transcontinental Railroad.
- Under the Banner of Heaven (2022) – American true crime drama television miniseries created by Dustin Lance Black based on the nonfiction book of the same name by Jon Krakauer.

== Box office ==
Title	Year	Studio	Actors	Director	Budget	Gross
The Best Two Years	2003	Halestorm Entertainment	K.C. Clyde, Kirby Heyborne, David Nibley, Cameron Hopkin, Scott Christopher, Michael Flynn	Scott S. Anderson	$400,000	$1,163,450
The Book of Mormon Movie, Vol. 1: The Journey	2003	Halestorm Entertainment	Noah Danby, Kirby Heyborne, Jacque Gray, Bryce Chamberlain, Jan Gardner, Ron Frederickson	Gary Rogers	$1,500,000	$1,680,020
Brigham City	2001	Zion Films	Richard Dutcher, Matthew A. Brown, Wilford Brimley, Carrie Morgan, Jongiorgi Enos, Tayva Patch	Richard Dutcher	$900,000	$852,206
Charly	2002		Jeremy Hoop, Randy King, Heather Beers	Adam Thomas Anderegg	$950,000	$813,685
Forever Strong	2008	Lonesome Highway Productions	Sean Faris, Gary Cole, Penn Badgley, Arielle Kebbel, Sean Astin, Neal McDonough, Olesya Rulin	Ryan Little		$719,556
God's Army	2000	Zion Films	Matthew A. Brown, Richard Dutcher, Jacque Gray, DeSean Terry, Michael Buster, Luis Robledo, Jeff Kelly, John Pentecost, Lynne Carr	Richard Dutcher	$300,000	$2,637,726
God's Army 2: States of Grace	2005	Zion Films	Lucas Fleischer, Jeffrey Scott Kelly, J.J. Boone	Richard Dutcher	$800,000	$203,144
The Saratov Approach	2013	Three Coin Productions, Saratov Films	Corbin Allred, Maclain Nelson, Nikita Bogolyubov, Alex Veadov	Garrett Batty	$	$2,146,999
Inspired Guns	2014	Pitch White Entertainment	David Lassetter, Shona Kay, Dashieli Wolf, Jarrod Phillips, Rick Macy, Charan Prabhakar, Christian Busath, Alix Maria Taulbee	Adam White	$175,000	
The Other Side of Heaven	2001	Walt Disney Pictures	Christopher Gorham, Anne Hathaway	Mitch Davis	$7,000,000	$4,720,371
The R.M.	2003	Halestorm Entertainment	Kirby Heyborne, Daryn Tufts, Will Swenson, Britani Bateman, Tracy Ann Evans, Merrill Dodge, Michael Birkeland, Maren Ord, Gary Crowton	Kurt Hale	$500,000	$1,111,615
Saints and Soldiers	2003	Excel Entertainment Group	Corbin Allred, Alexander Niver, Kirby Heyborne, Lawrence Bagby, Peter Aste Holden	Ryan Little	$780,000	$1,310,470
Saturday's Warrior	1989	Fieldbrook Entertainment	Erik Hickenlooper, Cori Jacobsen, Davison Cheney, Bart Hickenlooper	Bob Williams		
The Singles Ward	2002	Halestorm Entertainment	Will Swenson, Connie Young, Kirby Heyborne, Daryn Tufts, Michael Birkeland, Lincoln Hoppe	Kurt Hale	$500,000	$1,250,798
The Work and the Glory	2004	Excel Entertainment Group	Sam Hennings, Brenda Strong, Eric Johnson, Alexander Carroll, Tiffany Dupont, Jonathan Scarfe	Russell Holt	$7.5 million	$3,347,647
Meet the Mormons	2014	Excel Entertainment Group & Intellectual Reserve, Inc.	Jermaine Sullivan, Ken Niumatalolo, Carolina Muñoz Marin, Bishnu Adhukari, Gail Halvorsen, Dawn Armstrong, Jenna Kim Jones	Blair Treu		$5,883,132 (all proceeds donated to the American Red Cross)

== See also ==
- Christian film industry
- The Book of Mormon (musical)
- Cleanflix – the 2009 documentary about edited versions of R-rated movies
- Mormon pornography
