= Scott Christopher =

American actor

- Born: Scott Christopher Clafin; January 13, 1967 (age 59); Ferndale, Michigan, U.S.
- Education: Brigham Young University (BA); University of Connecticut (MS)
- Occupations: Actor, author
- Years active: 1990--Present
- Spouse: Elizabeth Christopher
- Children: 5

Scott Christopher (born Scott Christopher-Claflin, January 13, 1967) is an American actor and author. He is best known for his roles as Lt. Frank Quincy in Granite Flats, Kyle Harrison in The Best Two Years, and Brigadier General Alexander Doniphan in the religious biopic Joseph Smith: The Prophet of the Restoration. He previously served as the spokesperson and mascot for Orchard Supply Hardware, appearing in many of their commercials. He is well known for his roles in Mormon cinema.

== Early life and education ==
Christopher was born Scott Christopher-Clafin on January 13, 1967 in Ferndale, Michigan. He attended Brigham Young University where he won the Irene Ryan Award in 1991 at the Kennedy Center in Washington, D.C., an award annually presented to the nation's top collegiate actor. He was the first student from BYU to have won it. He received a master's degree in human resources management from the University of Connecticut.

== Career ==
Christopher made his screen acting debut as Chuck Lundgreen in a 1990 film At Gunpoint. In the early parts of his career, he primarily played supporting or guest roles in various films and television programs. From 2002 to 2003, he had a recurring role as Coach Austin in Everwood.

In 2002, he played two cameo roles in The Singles Ward which began his career in Mormon cinema for which he is best known today. He starred as Kyle Anderson in The Best Two Years and as Michael Jaymes in Mobsters and Mormons. In 2005, he had a supporting role as Brigadier General Alexander Doniphan in Joseph Smith: The Prophet of the Restoration, a biopic about the life of Joseph Smith, the founder of the Latter Day Saint movement. He portrayed Joseph Smith III, founder of the Community of Christ, in the film In Emma's Footsteps. In 2016, he narrated Hidden in the Heartland, a documentary series investigating the Heartland Model, a proposed theory about the geographic setting of the Book of Mormon. He portrayed Peter Whitmer Sr. in two unrelated history films about early Mormonism.

From 2011 to 2015, he starred in Granite Flats as Lt. Frank Quincy, a hospital patient who is being used as a test subject for MKUltra. Since the 2020s, he has played in various Hallmark films and other lifestyle movies.

== Personal life ==
He is married to Elizabeth Christopher and they have 5 sons. He is a member of The Church of Jesus Christ of Latter-day Saints and served a proselyting mission to Barcelona and surrounding areas in Spain. He speaks fluent Spanish. He currently lives in Tennessee.

== Filmography ==
=== Film ===
Year	Title	Role	Notes
1990	At Gunpoint	Chuck Lundgreen	
1994	Rockwell	Willie Akers	
1996	Same River Twice	Lawyer	
1997	Truth or Consequences, N.M.	Frank Pearson	
1998	Angels in the Attic	John Hillman	
2001	Yankee 2 Kilo	Wally Guzzle	
2001	The Penny Promise	Will Duncan	
2002	The Singles Ward	Ankle Instructor, BBQ Chicken Guy	
2002	Handcart	Robert Quincy	
2003	The R.M.	District Attorney	
2003	Right on Track	Tramel	
2003	Clubhouse Detectives in Scavenger Hunt	Mallory	
2003	The Work and the Story	Critic	
2004	The Best Two Years	Kyle Harrison	
2005	Down and Derby	Delivery Guy	
2005	Mobsters and Mormons	Michael Jaymes	
2007	The Dance	Howard	
2010	My Girlfriend's Boyfriend	Garrett	
2011	Joseph Smith: The Prophet of the Restoration	Brigadier General Alexander Doniphan	
2012	The Last Eagle Scout	Chad Thornburg	
2016	Singing with Angels	Jason Larson	
2016	Love Everlasting	Dr. Miller	
2017	The High Road	Thomas Kirkwood	
2017	Kirtland: America's Sacred Ground	Sidney Rigdon	
2017	The Stray	Dave Smith	
2017	Web of Spies	Frank	
2018	Not Cinderella's Type	Dr. Bailey	
2018	In Emma's Footsteps	Joseph Smith III	
2018	Fall City	Pastor Adam	
2018	Vice	Marshal of the United States Supreme Court	
2019	The Trial of Porter Rockwell	Uhlinger	
2021	Mabel and George	Jim	Short film
2021	Bookworm and the Beast	Allen White	
2021	Witnesses	Peter Whitmer Sr.	
2021	Identical Love	Henry Sallow	
2022	Undaunted: Witnesses of the Book of Mormon	Peter Whitmer Sr.	
2022	Just Add Love	Derek	
2023	Smoker		
2023	A Sacrifice of All Things: The Story of St. George and its Temple		
2023	Journey to Christmas	Executive	Television film

=== Television ===
Year	Title	Role	Notes
1992	Miracles & Other Wonders	Jack Knowles	Episode: Pilot
1998	Promised Land	Rice, Talley	2 episodes
1997--2002	Touched by an Angel	Peter Darnell, Cop	2 episodes
2002--2003	Everwood	Coach Austin	5 episodes
2004	Going to the Mat	Mr. Kamins	Television film
2007	Saving Sarah Cain	Jerry Kitchel	Television film
2013--2015	Granite Flats	Frank Quincy	Main cast
2016	Modern Family	Victor	Episode: Thunk in the Trunk
2016	Criminal Minds: Beyond Borders	Glenn Peters	Episode: The Matchmaker
2016--2019	Hidden in the Heartland	Narrotor	Main cast
2017	An Hour Behind	Tom	Television film
2018	Christmas Wonderland		Television film
2018	Christmas Made to Order	Davis	Television film
2019	Love, Fall & Order	Kevin	Television film
2019	Matchmaker Christmas	Marvin	Television film
2019	Timeless Love	Dr. Yeats	Television film
2021	Christmas Hotel	Mr. Baker	Television film
2020	NCIS	Detective Edmund Kerrigan	Episode: Blarney
2021--2023	NCIS: Los Angeles	CIA Officer Chris Behr	2 episodes
2021	A Dangerous Defense	Brice	Television film
2022	Hot Chocolate Holiday	Landlord	Television film
2022	Temptation Under the Sun	Chief Inspector Dexter	Television film
2022	A Cozy Christmas Inn	Ed	Television film
2023	The Rookie: Feds	Peter	Episode: The Remora
2023	Journey to Christmas	Executive	Television film
