= Mobsters and Mormons =

- Directed by: John Moyer
- Written by: John Moyer
- Produced by: Kurt Hale; Dave Hunter; John Moyer
- Starring: Mark DeCarlo; Jeanette Puhich; Clayton Taylor; Scott Christopher; Britani Bateman; Olesya Rulin; Jan Broberg Felt; John Moyer; Michael Kagan
- Distributed by: Halestorm Entertainment
- Release date: 2005
- Running time: 93 minutes
- Country: United States
- Language: English
- Budget: $350,000
- Box office: $409,604

Mobsters and Mormons is a 2005 American comedy film written, directed and produced by John Moyer, who also plays a role in the film. It is also produced by Kurt Hale and Dave Hunter of Halestorm Entertainment. The plot concerns a mafioso who moves to Utah after being placed in the Witness Protection Program.

== Plot ==
In Philadelphia, Pennsylvania, mobster Carmine "Beans" Pasquale is arrested by the FBI. While he is being interviewed, the FBI agents say that they have enough to put him away for twenty to twenty-five years. Carmine agrees to talk and is placed in the Witness Protection Program, along with his wife Gina and son Vincent. They move to Happy Valley, Utah and assume the identities of George, Linda and Patrick Cheeseman. What follows is culture shock on both sides between the local Mormons and the devoutly Catholic Pasquales/Cheesemans. Eventually, the mob discovers Carmine's whereabouts and sends two killers after him.

A subplot involves the church politics in the local Mormon congregation (or "ward") as the bishop moves away due to a death in the family and a new bishop must be selected.

== Main cast ==
- Mark DeCarlo as Carmine "The Beans" Zindelli Pasquale (George Cheeseman)
- Jeanette Puhich as Gina Pasquale (Linda Cheeseman)
- Clayton Taylor as Vincent Pasquale (Patrick Cheeseman)
- Scott Christopher as Michael Jaymes
- Britani Bateman as Kate Jaymes
- Olesya Rulin as Julie Jaymes
- Jan Broberg Felt as Louise Means
- John Moyer as Agent Tuttle
- Michael Kagan as Angello Marcello

== Development ==
Britani Bateman, who plays Michael Jaymes' wife, was pregnant while filming this movie. Writer/director John E. Moyer wrote the part especially for Bateman. When casting the film he learned of her pregnancy and reworked the script to have her character be pregnant as well.

Originally, director John E. Moyer was interested in having LDS actor Dave Nibley from The Best Two Years play Agent Tuttle, but Nibley's schedule conflicted with the filming. Moyer himself stepped in to play the role.

== Box office ==
The film was made on a budget of $350,000 but only brought in $409,604 in total box office revenues. It was however, released to only a limited number of theaters throughout Utah, Arizona, and Idaho; an area predominantly known among LDS circles as the Jello Belt.

== See also ==
- The Singles Ward – 2001
- The R.M. – 2003
- The Home Teachers – 2004
- Church Ball – 2005
