= Curt Doussett =

American actor

- Education: Brigham Young University
- Spouse: Tonia Freeman-Doussett

Curt Doussett is an American actor who is the host of the Discovery Channel's Hazard Pay and owner of ComedySportz Utah.

== Early life ==
Curt grew up in San Bernardino, CA. He attended both Cal State University at San Bernardino before transferring to Brigham Young University. Curt studied music composition and theory at Brigham Young University before getting into acting as a regular performer at Orem's Hale Center Theater.

== Career ==
He has been in over 60 theatrical productions and has made several appearances on television. His credits include Everwood, Touched by an Angel, NCIS, Dumb & Dumber, and parts in several Disney films.

When Doussett's agent found out that Hazard Pay, a new Discovery show, was auditioning for a host, a demo tape of Doussett was sent in. The demo tape alone got Doussett to the final three. When Doussett showed up in person, he told the producers he wasn't afraid to try anything. A little later, Doussett found out he was going to be the host of the television show.

In 2013, he was announced as the new host of Syfy's new show Exit which premiered on 4 June 2013.

== Acting Credit ==
=== Film acting credits ===
Curt's appeared in the 2011 film Midway to Heaven (also known as Heaven Is Waiting) starring opposite Michelle Money and Kirby Heyborne. Curt's other film acting credits include The R.M., Saints and Soldiers (nominated for two Independent Spirit Awards), Church Ball opposite Fred Willard and Clint Howard, and the upcoming Adventures of Food Boy opposite Lucas Grabeel.

=== TV acting credits ===
Doussett starred in Discovery Channel's Hazard Pay in 2007. Other television acting credits include CSI: Miami, Touched by an Angel, NCIS: Navy Criminal Investigative Service, Phil of the Future and Everwood. He also starred in the telefilm Go Figure for Disney Channel.
