= John Moyer (comedian) =

American comedian and film director

- Born: John Eastlack Moyer; May 1, 1969 (age 57); Camden, New Jersey
- Occupations: comedian, writer, director, actor

John Moyer (born May 1, 1969 in Camden, New Jersey) is an American stand-up comedian, screenwriter, actor and film producer. Moyer co-wrote the screenplays for The Singles Ward, The R.M., and The Home Teachers. He also wrote, produced, directed, and acted in Mobsters and Mormons.

== Screenwriting ==
- The Singles Ward (2002)
- The R.M. (2003)
- The Home Teachers (2004)
- Mobsters and Mormons (2005)
- Single Second Ward (2007)
- Disjointed Custody (2012)

== Acting ==
- The R.M. - Would-be Home Teacher (2003)
- The Home Teachers - President Mason (2004)
- Mobsters and Mormons - Agent Tuttle (2005)

== Directing ==
- Mobsters and Mormons

== Career ==
In 1991, while attending Brigham Young University to study Theater and Film, John Moyer first attempted stand-up comedy when he went to an open mic night at comedy club in Provo, Utah and decided to get on stage. After graduating from college in 1994, Moyer began to pursue a career as a stand-up comedian. Speaking of the experience, Moyer said in an interview:

Of course, all my friends got their degrees and there were job placement programs and they were going and working for MIT or whatever else it was, making US$100,000 a year. I was living out of my car doing comedy. But I quickly discovered I had no other marketable skills.

Years later, after experiencing his first divorce, Moyer wrote a screenplay based on his own life experiences of being a divorced Mormon trying to make it as a stand-up comedian. He named the script The Singles Ward.

I graduated and I was doing comedy and I went through kind of a very painful divorce. I wrote it strictly for myself. Never thought it would see the light of day. Threw it on the shelf. It was just kind of a catharsis for me, a venting experience."

Eventually, Moyer showed the script to Kurt Hale, grandson of Ruth Hale (founder of the Hale Center Theater, a popular Utah Valley community theater). Hale and partner Dave Hunter decided to make the script into low-budget comedy aimed at members of the LDS Church. Hale re-wrote the script and directed the movie. Eventually, Hale and Hunter founded a company called Halestorm Entertainment to distribute the movie in 2002. Although panned by critics, The Singles Ward was a popular novelty for Mormon audiences, grossing $1,250,798 at theaters in Utah and other areas with heavy Mormon populations.

Upon the financial success of The Singles Ward, Hale quickly got to work on his second LDS comedy movie, The R.M. Once again, Hale directed from a script co-written by Hale and Moyer, and Hale cast many of the same actors from his first movie. The R.M. was released by Halestorm Entertainment in 2003. Although the box office returns were almost as strong as The Singles Ward ($1,111,615), audience feedback was not as favorable.

In 2003, Halestorm Entertainment released The Home Teachers, the third LDS comedy by Kurt Hale. Like before, the movie was from a script co-written by Hale and Moyer. The Home Teachers was a critical and box office disappointment. Critics lambasted its use of slapstick humor and criticized what they perceived as a heavy-handed plot. The film also suffered from direct comparisons to Tommy Boy, a popular 1995 film starring Chris Farley, and David Spade, and Planes, Trains & Automobiles, a 1987 film directed by John Hughes. Many critics felt that The Home Teachers borrowed too much from these films, a concern one professional critic referred to as "verging on comedic plagiarism". The movie grossed $203,917 during its theatrical run, less than 17% the gross of The Singles Ward.

After The Home Teachers, Moyer departed from Hale and to make his own LDS movie, Mobsters and Mormons. Halestorm Entertainment released Mobsters and Mormons in 2005. The movie grossed $409,604 in total box office revenues, approximately 33% the gross of The Singles Ward.

Moyer has not directed another feature film.

In 2007, Halestorm Entertainment released The Singles 2nd Ward, a straight-to-DVD sequel to the 2002 movie, co-written by Hale and Moyer.

In 2011, Moyer produced The Real Life Singles Ward, a straight-to-DVD video documentary about LDS dating, produced on a budget of $3,100.

In 2012, Moyer wrote and acted in Disjointed Custody, a four-minute movie directed by Christian Serge that was posted on YouTube. Moyer wrote the short script based on observations made during his own divorces.

In the state of Utah, you’re required to actually take a parenting/divorce class. That’s actually where I got the inspiration. People do and say some really mean things that affect their kids and I wanted to make a commentary on that."

In 2012, John Moyer became a comedy hypnotist.

== Personal life ==
In 2016, Moyer married Rachelle Joseph, Mrs. Utah 2003 and 1st Runner Up Mrs. America 2003. Years earlier, in 1991, John married Tracie L. Collins in Pitman, New Jersey.
