= Will Swenson (actor) =

American actor & singer (born 1972)

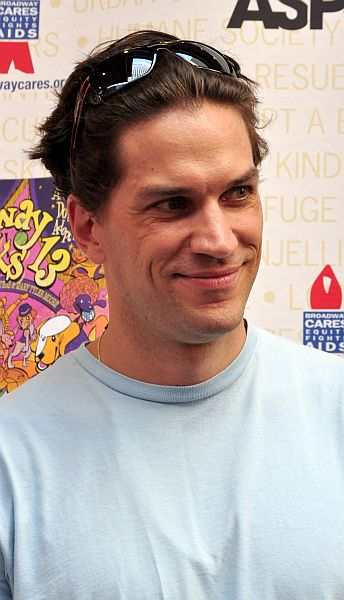
- Swenson in July 2011
- Born: October 26, 1972 (age 53); Provo, Utah, United States
- Occupations: Actor, singer
- Spouse(s): Amy Westerby (div.) Audra McDonald (m. 2012)
- Children: 3

Will Swenson (born October 26, 1972) is an American actor and singer best known for his work in musical theatre. He also has developed a film career, primarily in LDS cinema. His Broadway and West End credits include principal roles in Hair (for which he was nominated for a Tony Award), Les Misérables, Waitress, Assassins, and A Beautiful Noise.

== Early life ==
Two of Swenson's grandparents, James Nathan Hale and Ruth Hale, were playwrights; Ruth was also an actor.

Swenson moved throughout the United States during his childhood. He attended Brigham Young University and later served as a missionary for The Church of Jesus Christ of Latter-day Saints in Guayaquil, Ecuador. As of 2008, he was no longer practicing the LDS faith. After graduating from college, Swenson earned his Equity card by getting cast by Disney at Walt Disney World, performing in Beauty and The Beast Live: On Stage and the Hoop Dee Doo Review.

== Career ==
Swenson is known among members of the LDS Church for his role as Jonathan Jordan in the LDS Cinema movie The Singles Ward (2002) and its sequel, The Singles 2nd Ward (2007). Swenson co-wrote, directed and acted in the LDS Cinema mockumentary Sons of Provo (2004).

Swenson appeared on Broadway in Lestat, 110 in the Shade and Brooklyn. Off Broadway, he played the role of Stacee Jaxx in the musical Rock of Ages but did not go on to perform the role on Broadway because he was offered the starring role of Berger in the Broadway revival of Hair. He played Sir Sagramore in Camelot at Lincoln Center and Chris in the second national tour of Miss Saigon, the latter of which he performed opposite future The Real Housewives of Salt Lake City star Britani Bateman.

He played the role of Berger in the off-Broadway 40th Anniversary Concert of Hair opposite Karen Olivo. In 2008, Swenson was again cast as Berger in The Public Theater's revival of the show in Central Park. He went on to reprise the role when the production moved to Broadway in March 2009. He received critical acclaim for his performance on Broadway and was nominated for a Tony Award for Best Performance by a Featured Actor in a Musical. He played the role of Berger again in the West End revival of Hair which began performances on April 1, 2010, and ended his limited engagement on May 29, 2010. Audra McDonald and Swenson reprised their roles in a two-week fundraising production of 110 in the Shade at the Hale Center Theater in Orem, Utah.

On October 8, 2009, Swenson appeared in the guest cameo slot for the extension performance of Katie Thompson's R.R.R.E.D.: A Secret Musical, as part of the 2009 New York Musical Theatre Festival. In 2010 in Toronto, Canada, Swenson played the lead role of "Tick"/"Mitzi" in the pre-Broadway North American company of Priscilla: Queen of the Desert.

In October 2013, Swenson was cast as Inspector Javert in the 2014 Broadway revival of Les Misérables, which opened in March 2014 at New York's Imperial Theatre, where the musical had previously run for 13 years.

In 2018, Swenson played Satan in the New Group's off-Broadway production of Jerry Springer: The Opera. In 2020, he appeared in the Netflix show Chilling Adventures of Sabrina as Pan.

In June 2022, Swenson began playing the role of Neil Diamond (Then) in the new musical A Beautiful Noise, The Neil Diamond Musical, based on the life and music of the performer, at the Emerson Colonial Theatre in Boston. The show moved to Broadway later in 2022 officially opening on December 4, at the Broadhurst Theatre in New York City. Swenson has said he grew up surrounded by and loving Diamond's music as the singer was one of his father's favorites. Swenson added that in his youth he would sing the songs and eventually could even sing them sounding like Diamond.

In January and February 2026, Swenson is set to star in Sweeney Todd: The Demon Barber of Fleet Street as Sweeney Todd at the La Mirada Theatre in California. He is then scheduled to return to A Beautiful Noise in Australia at the Princess Theatre from August to October 2026 and the Sydney Lyric from November to December 2026.

== Personal life ==
Swenson met his first wife, Amy Westerby, while they were both performing in one of his grandmother's comedies, Hopsville Holiday. The couple have two sons, Bridger and Sawyer; they have since divorced.

Swenson and actress Audra McDonald became engaged in January 2012 and were married on October 6, 2012. In October 2016, their daughter Sally was born.

In October 2020, Swenson joined other Broadway stars in a virtual letter-writing event hosted by nonpartisan voter advocacy group VoteRiders. The mission was to educate at-risk voters on their options in the upcoming election, focusing specifically on voters in Florida and Wisconsin.

== Theatre credits ==
Year	Show	Role	Category
1999-2000	Miss Saigon	Chris Scott	US National Tour
2001	Jekyll & Hyde	Dr. Henry Jekyll / Mr. Edward Hyde	Westchester Broadway Theatre
2004	Brooklyn	Vocalist; u/s Street Singer, u/s Taylor Collins	Broadway
2005	Two Gentleman of Verona	Ensemble	Off-Broadway
2006	Lestat	Ensemble; u/s Armand, u/s Lestat	Broadway
2007	Adrift in Macao	Rick Shaw	Off-Broadway
2007	110 in the Shade	Cody Bridger; u/s Bill Starbuck	Broadway
2007	Hair	Berger	40th Anniversary Concert
2008	Camelot	Sir Sagramore	Lincoln Center
2008	The Slug Bearers of Kayrol Island	Psychiatrist	Off-Broadway
2008	Hair	Berger	Off-Broadway
2008	Rock of Ages	Stacee Jaxx	Off-Broadway
2009-2010	Hair	Berger	Broadway
2010	Hair	Berger	West End
2010	Bonnie & Clyde	Clyde	Workshop
2010	Priscilla, Queen of the Desert	Tick (Mitzi)	Toronto
2010	Priscilla, Queen of the Desert	Tick (Mitzi)	Broadway
2013	Murder Ballad	Tom	Off-Broadway
2013	Little Miss Sunshine	Richard Hoover	Off-Broadway
2014	Les Misérables	Inspector Javert	Broadway
2014	Bull Durham	Crash Davis	Alliance Theatre
2014-2015	Les Misérables	Inspector Javert	Broadway
2015	The Rocky Horror Show	Frank 'N' Furter	Pioneer Theatre Company
2015	Les Misérables	Inspector Javert	Broadway
2016	Pericles	Cleon	Theatre for a New Audience
2016	Disaster!	Tony	Broadway
2016	The Pirates of Penzance	The Pirate King	Barrington Stage Company
2017	Hair	Berger	Lincoln Center
2017-2018	Waitress	Earl Hunterson	Broadway
2018	Jerry Springer - The Opera	Satan	Off-Broadway
2018	The Royal Family of Broadway	Tony Cavendish	Barrington Stage Company
2018	Parade	Tom Watson	Workshop
2019	Nantucket Sleigh Ride	McPhee	Lincoln Center
2019	Fun Home	Bruce Bechdel	Workshop
2021-2022	Assassins	Charles J. Guiteau	Off-Broadway
2022	Assassins	Charles J. Guiteau	Broadway Concert
2022	A Beautiful Noise	Neil Diamond (then)	Boston
2022-2023	A Beautiful Noise	Neil Diamond (then)	Broadway
2026	Sweeney Todd: The Demon Barber of Fleet Street	Sweeney Todd	La Mirada Theatre
2026	A Beautiful Noise	Neil Diamond (then)	Australia

== Filmography ==
=== Film ===
Year	Title	Role	Notes
1996	Treasure Chest	Thor	Short film
2002	The Singles Ward	Jonathan Jordan	
2003	The R.M.	Kori Swenson	
2004	Sons of Provo	Will Jensen	Also executive producer
2004	Dear John	Tyson	Short film
2007	The Singles 2nd Ward	Jonathan Jordan	
2010	The Switch	Actor on stage	
2013	Gods Behaving Badly	Ares	Unreleased
2014	This Is Where I Leave You	Young Mort Altman	
2017	The Greatest Showman	Philo Barnum	

=== Television ===
Year	Title	Role	Notes
2002	All My Children	Purse-snatcher	Episode: August 14, 2002
2006	As the World Turns	Vanya	Episode: December 18, 2006
2007	Six Degrees	Photoshoot man	Episode: "Slings and Arrows"; uncredited
2008	Live from Lincoln Center	Sir Sagramore	Episode: "Camelot"
2009	Law & Order: Criminal Intent	Joe Lazar	Episode: "Rock Star"
2009	Late Show with David Letterman	Berger	Episode: April 30, 2009
2012	The Good Wife	Justin Varney	Episode: "Pants on Fire"
2012	Pzazz 101	Will	Episode: "Method Acting"
2016	Law & Order: Special Victims Unit	Mitch Hampton	Episode: "Broken Rhymes"
2016–17	No Tomorrow	Pete	2 episodes
2020	Chilling Adventures of Sabrina	Pan	5 episodes
2021	The Bite	Brian Ritter	
2022	First Kill	Sebastian Fairmont	Recurring role
2025	Elsbeth	Axel Frostad	Episode: "Hot Tub Crime Machine"

=== Web series ===
Year	Title	Role	Notes
2014	Submissions Only	Fred Planer	Episode: "Having Foresight"

== Awards and nominations ==
Year	Award	Category	Work	Result
2009	Tony Award	Best Featured Actor in a Musical	Hair	Nominated
2009	Drama Desk Award	Outstanding Actor in a Musical	Hair	Nominated
2018	Obie Award	Performance	Jerry Springer: The Opera	Won
2022	Drama League Award	Distinguished Performance	Assassins	Nominated
2022	Outer Critics Circle Award	Outstanding Featured Actor in a Musical	Assassins	Nominated
2022	Lucille Lortel Award	Outstanding Featured Performer in a Musical	Assassins	Nominated
2023	Drama League Award	Distinguished Performance	A Beautiful Noise	Nominated
