= Ruth Hale (playwright and actress) =

American actress and dramatist

Ruth Hale (October 14, 1908 – April 20, 2003) was an American playwright and actress.

== Biography ==
Hale was born in Granger, Utah (now West Valley City), adopted by Will Hudson a farmer. Ruth was an active member of the Church of Jesus Christ of Latter-day Saints. She and her husband, James Nathan Hale, moved to California to seek out opportunities in Hollywood. With little success finding film roles, they founded the Glendale Centre Theater. Ruth Hale wrote many original plays for the venue including A Choice Land and How Near the Angels.

Soon, they and their extended family had opened a number of theaters featuring a center stage (arena theaters or Theater in the round) including Hale Centre Theatre (Utah) and Hale Centre Theatre (Arizona).

The Hales were also playwrights. They wrote their first play together, Handcart Trails, to save on the budget of a ward play production in Granger in the 1930s. This play was published in the MIA Book of Plays in 1940. Their play, Melody Jones, was shown to a national audience by Kurt Television Theatre.

== Filmography ==
=== Director and producer ===
- Oliver Cowdery: Witness to the Book of Mormon (1954)- Screenplay writer and co-producer with her husband.
- A Choice Land (1954)- producer.
- Is Fast Day A Headache (1956)- producer.

=== Actor ===
- Pioneers in Petticoats (1969)
- The Singles Ward (2002)
- The R.M. (2003)
- The Home Teachers (2004)
- Hard Times (2005)
