= Hale Centre Theatre =

Hale Centre Theatre may refer to:

- Hale Centre Theatre (Arizona)
- Hale Centre Theatre (Utah)
