= Singles ward =

Singles ward may refer to:

- Singles ward (LDS Church), a type of ward in the Church of Jesus Christ of Latter-day Saints
- The Singles Ward, a 2002 film about fictional events surrounding such a ward
- The Singles 2nd Ward, a 2007 sequel to the above film
