= Mormon pornography =

Latter Day Saint doctrine-themed subgenre

Mormon pornography is a subgenre of pornography themed around the Mormon religion.

== Genre ==
According to the journalist Isha Aran, The Church of Jesus Christ of Latter-day Saints (LDS Church) views Mormon pornography as blasphemous, and most directors and performers in Mormon pornography are ex-Mormons. Mormon pornography typically depicts sex acts between actors and/or actresses portraying members of the LDS Church. Performers may be (initially) dressed in temple garments, and the setting may be the inside of a Mormon temple. In accordance with stereotyped Mormon norms, profane language is absent.

Aran writes that the genre originated in 2010 with the launch of the gay pornography site MormonBoyz.com. Website founder Legrand Wolf claims to be an ex-Mormon with a doctoral degree from Brigham Young University. The site MormonGirlz.com, launched in 2014, by a woman known in the industry as Brooke Hunter, a 33-year-old ex-Mormon, features both heterosexual and lesbian relationships between Mormon characters.

Wolf's pornography has been rejected by Utah's Pride organization, with its executive director, the former leader of Utah's branch of the American Civil Liberties Union, stating, "LeGrand Wolf isn't a person. That disturbs me, that we don't know who these people are and where they come from."

In the Victorian era, examples of Mormon pornography existed, as part of anti-Mormon tracts using erotic stories.

== 'Bubble porn' ==
In the 2010s, a photo editing technique which used strategically placed solid color overlays on photos of clothed women which gave the impression of nudity while leaving the genitals and breasts obscured. As this technique was believed to circumvent LDS conventions banning members from viewing sexually explicit materials, it was referred to as "Mormon pornography". Due to the common approach of using a solid color overlay with circular cut outs to reveal the human subject, it was also called "bubble porn".

== See also ==
- Homosexuality and the Church of Jesus Christ of Latter-day Saints
- Sexuality and the Church of Jesus Christ of Latter-day Saints
- Masturbation and The Church of Jesus Christ of Latter-day Saints
- Mormon cinema
- Convent pornography
- Nunsploitation
- Religious views on pornography
