= Heaven's Door (2012 film) =

- film poster
- Directed by: Craig Clyde
- Written by: Craig Clyde
- Story by: Bryce W. Fillmore
- Produced by: Bryce W. Fillmore
- Starring: Dean Cain; Charisma Carpenter; Joanna Cassidy; Tommy 'Tiny' Lister; Edward Herrmann; Kirstin Dorn
- Cinematography: Brandon Christensen
- Edited by: Cody Petersen
- Music by: Charlie Colin; Sean Genockey; Tom Luce; Adam Ben Rossi
- Production companies: Backdoor to Heaven; Stone Five Studios
- Distributed by: Lightning Entertainment; Anderson Digital; ARC Entertainment; Eagle Films
- Release date: November 27, 2012
- Running time: 98 minutes
- Country: United States
- Language: English

Heaven's Door (also Doorway to Heaven) is a 2012 American spiritual drama film starring Dean Cain and Charisma Carpenter.

== Story ==
Riley Taylor is a 12-year-old girl whose best friend, her grandfather, passes away. Her parents are also separated and going through a divorce, and her brother suffers from serious asthma. After having a near death experience that allowed her to pass through Heaven for one second, receives the ability to heal the sick and injured. After healing a neighbor's cat, she begins to accept money to use her powers, but her grandmother puts an end to this. She also uses her gift to heal her sick brother. It is discovered too late that whenever she heals someone she takes on that person's ailment herself. Knowing this, she continues to use her gift until she succumbs to her numerous ailments and dies. Through the power of prayer, her family wills her back to life.

== Cast ==
- Charisma Carpenter as Julie Taylor
- Dean Cain as Leo Taylor
- Joanna Cassidy as Ruth Christensen
- Tommy 'Tiny' Lister as Ben Wilson
- Edward Herrmann as Nate Christensen
- Kirstin Dorn as Riley Taylor
- Kaden Billin as Morgan Taylor
- Mark Brocksmith as Delivery Van Driver
- Annalaya Brown as Little Girl
- Merrily Evans as Receptionist
- Michael Flynn as Dr. Everett Sloan
- Frank Gerrish as Wally Anderson
- Anna Harris as Katie Davis
- Grace Hunter as Toddler Riley
- Jakob Hunter as Walter
- Tom Markus as Bob Connelly
- Mark Mattson as George Finley
- David Nibley as Mitch Hillburn
- Skyler James Sandak as Darley Allen
- Jaci Twiss as Melissa Sue Davis
- Connie Young as Nadine Dillon
- Angella Joy as Reporter
