= Connie Riet =

American actress (born 1974)

- Born: 1974 (age 51–52)
- Occupation: Actress

Connie Riet (née McFarland, formerly Young) (born 1974) is an American actress. She is known for playing Peggy Barlett in Read It and Weep and Cammie Giles in The Singles Ward. She reprised the role of Cammie in The Singles 2nd Ward. She also appeared in Sons of Provo. Cult film fans know her as Holly Waits in Troll 2. Riet is a former member of The Church of Jesus Christ of Latter-day Saints.
