= Wally Joyner =

American baseball player (born 1962)

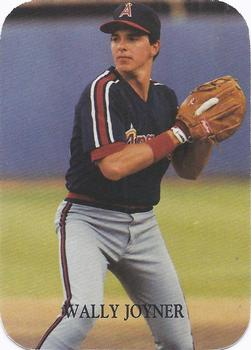
- Joyner with the Angels in 1987
- First baseman
- Born: June 16, 1962 (age 64); Atlanta, Georgia, U.S.
- Batted: Left Threw: Left

MLB debut
- April 8, 1986, for the California Angels

Last MLB appearance
- June 14, 2001, for the Anaheim Angels

MLB statistics
- Batting average: .289
- Hits: 2,060
- Home runs: 204
- Runs batted in: 1,106
- Stats at Baseball Reference

Teams
- As player: California Angels (1986–1991); Kansas City Royals (1992–1995); San Diego Padres (1996–1999); Atlanta Braves (2000); Anaheim Angels (2001); As coach: San Diego Padres (2007–2008); Philadelphia Phillies (2013); Detroit Tigers (2014–2016)

Career highlights and awards
- All-Star (1986)

Wallace Keith Joyner (born June 16, 1962) is an American former professional baseball player. He played for four major league teams during a 16-year career, most notably for the California Angels, for whom he was an All-Star. He was a member of the pennant-winning 1998 San Diego Padres.

== Early life and career ==
Joyner attended Redan High School in Stone Mountain, Georgia, a suburb of Atlanta. He attended college at Brigham Young University. In the 1983 MLB draft, the California Angels selected Joyner in the third round as a compensation pick from the New York Yankees for signing Don Baylor.

Joyner credited a stint with the Mayagüez Indians of the Puerto Rican Professional Baseball League as fundamental in his improvement as a slugger. Then-batting coach José Manuel Morales forced him to do power weight training and modify his posture at the batting cage, so as to develop upper body strength. He gained 10 pounds of muscle as a result of his workouts. He was consequently the top hitter on Puerto Rico's winter league on the 1985–86 season, winning the Triple Crown (.356, 14 HR, 48 RBI) in 54 games.

== California Angels ==
During his rookie season with the California Angels, Joyner became a fan favorite and briefly inspired a sensation in which Anaheim Stadium was dubbed "Wally World", after the fictional theme park in the film National Lampoon's Vacation. ESPN announcer Chris Berman called him Wally "Absorbine" Joyner, a nickname that stuck.

Joyner was the starting first baseman in the 1986 All-Star Game. Joyner tied Darryl Strawberry for first place in that year's Home Run Derby.

When the Angels met the New York Yankees in a game in August 1986, a fan threw a knife at Joyner. Joyner was grazed on the left arm by the butt end of the weapon, escaping injury.

Joyner broke up two no-hit bids in the ninth during the 1986 season. Against the Texas Rangers on June 16, he foiled Charlie Hough's bid with a single with one out in the ninth, scoring Jack Howell (who had reached on a three-base error) to tie the game at 1–1. Joyner, whose hit would be the Angels' only one of the game, eventually scored the winning run on Orlando Mercado's passed ball for a 2–1 Angels victory. Against the Detroit Tigers on August 20, Joyner broke up Walt Terrell's bid for a no-hitter by doubling with two out in the ninth; this would also be the Angels only hit in losing to the Tigers 3–0.

Joyner and the Angels advanced to the 1986 American League Championship Series, where they came within one strike of reaching the franchise's first World Series before losing in seven games. In game 3 of the series, Joyner was running home on an infield hit, and as he stepped on home plate, he unknowingly opened up a previously unseen staph infection on his shin, which led to him having to be hospitalized and miss the rest of the series.

At the end of the 1986 season, Joyner was the runner-up in the voting for the Rookie of the Year Award, losing to José Canseco. On October 3, 1987, Joyner hit three solo home runs against the Indians in a 12–5 victory on the next to last day of the season. He finished the 1987 season with 34 home runs and 117 RBI, both career highs.

== Post-Angels ==
After six years with the Angels, Joyner signed with the Kansas City Royals as a free agent for the 1992 season. He played with the Royals for four years. After the 1995 season, Joyner was traded to the San Diego Padres for Bip Roberts. He played with the Padres for four years, and was the starting first baseman on the 1998 pennant-winning team. After the 1999 season, Joyner was traded to the Atlanta Braves in a deal that also sent Reggie Sanders to the Braves and Bret Boone and Ryan Klesko to the Padres. He played with the Braves for one year before ending his career, as he wished, where it had begun, with the Anaheim Angels.

Joyner announced his retirement on June 16, 2001. In a taped message that was played on the Edison Field videoboard after the first inning that day, he thanked the Angels fans for their support and received a standing ovation.

In a 16-year career, Joyner posted a .289 batting average with 204 home runs and 1,106 RBI in 2,033 games played. Defensively, he was an excellent first baseman, recording a career .994 fielding percentage. He led the American League in fielding percentage at first base in 1989 and 1995 and the National League in 1996 and 1997.

In a November 2005 interview with ESPN The Magazine, Joyner revealed that he had briefly used steroids. At age 36, as his career was beginning to decline, he asked Padres teammate Ken Caminiti how to obtain them and did so. He took three pills before deciding not to continue and flushed them down the toilet. Joyner told Buster Olney that his reason for telling his story in public was to set the record straight for the sake of his daughters. Joyner was listed in the 2007 Mitchell Report.

== Coaching ==
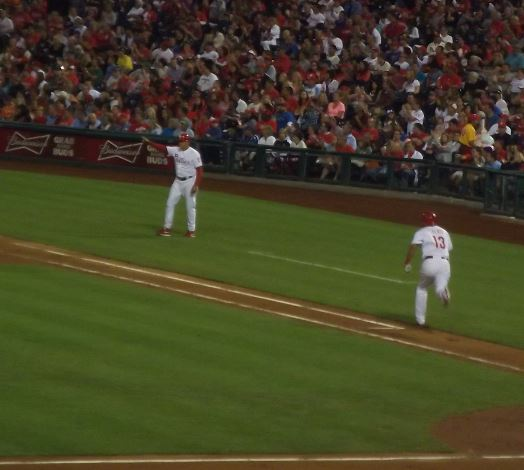
Joyner waves Freddy Galvis to second base while serving as first base coach in a Phillies game on September 7, 2013

On July 31, 2007, Joyner was hired by the San Diego Padres to be their hitting coach, replacing Merv Rettenmund. Previously, Joyner had served as a special assistant to Padres General Manager Kevin Towers. Between 2003 and 2007, he also acted as a roving minor league instructor and spring training instructor for the Padres.

In September 2008, Joyner resigned as the hitting coach for the Padres due to a number of factors including the team's low rankings in batting categories and a difference in philosophy in regards to hitting with members of upper management (most notably, CEO Sandy Alderson). The resignation came as somewhat of a surprise due to Joyner's relationship with the GM/VP Kevin Towers. Their friendship goes all the way back to the early 1980s as college teammates for the BYU Cougars. Towers even traded for Joyner in late 1995, one of the first few transactions he made as the new GM for the Padres. In spite of this, Joyner was likely to be let go at the end of the year like Bench Coach Craig Colbert was on September 29, 2008, due to the same factors in his resignation.

On October 15, 2012, Joyner was hired by the Philadelphia Phillies as their assistant hitting coach to new hitting coach Steve Henderson. Following the firing of Charlie Manuel, Joyner became the first base coach under interim manager, Ryne Sandberg.

On November 18, 2013, the Detroit Tigers announced the hiring of Joyner as their hitting coach. He was the team's hitting coach for the 2014, 2015, and 2016 seasons. He resigned after the 2016 season to pursue other opportunities.

== Personal life ==
Joyner resides in Mapleton, Utah. Joyner has invested in and appeared in films marketed to members of the Church of Jesus Christ of Latter-day Saints, including playing "Brother Angel" (a reference to the California Angels) in The Singles Ward, and "Brother Jensen" in the 2003 movie, The R.M.. He is the nephew of former United States Senator Paula Hawkins.

== See also ==
- List of Major League Baseball career hits leaders
- List of Major League Baseball career doubles leaders
- List of Major League Baseball career runs batted in leaders
- List of Major League Baseball players named in the Mitchell Report
