= Kirby Heyborne =

American actor (born 1977)

- Born: October 8, 1977 (age 48); Evanston, Wyoming, U.S.
- Education: University of Utah
- Occupations: Actor, musician, singer, songwriter, narrator, comedian

Kirby Heyborne (born October 8, 1977) is an American actor, musician, singer, songwriter, narrator and comedian. He is known for his work in films centered around the culture of The Church of Jesus Christ of Latter-day Saints (LDS Church). Heyborne has also worked extensively as an audiobook narrator, narrating more than 300 books. He has won two Odyssey Awards and an Audie Award for Middle Grade Title. In 2015, Booklist named him a Voice of Choice narrator.

== Early life and education ==
Heyborne graduated from Alta High School in 1995 where he was student body president. He is a member of the LDS Church and served as a missionary for the church in the Dominican Republic. He later graduated from the University of Utah with a degree in Economics.

== Career ==
Heyborne is both an actor and a musician; he has released several CDs on which he sings and plays the guitar. However, he did not become widely popular in the LDS Church community until his starring role in the film The R.M. in 2003. In 2008, his choice to appear in a commercial for Miller Lite generated some controversy given the LDS Church's stance against alcohol, which Heyborne believed led to him losing out on a subsequent performance at LDS Church-owned Brigham Young University. His first appearance in a non-LDS film was as "Teddy" in The Three Stooges in 2012. He also had appeared in a Best Buy commercial in late-summer 2013 promoting sales for Verizon phones.

In 2019, Heyborne began as host for a new show on BYUtv called Making Good.

== Awards and honors ==
In 2015, Booklist named Heyborne a Voice of Choice narrator, noting that he has a "skill at voicing accents and dialects, perhaps enhanced by his musical knowledge and ear, comes up frequently in reviews."

=== Awards ===
Year	Title	Award	Result	Ref.
2006	Cloud Atlas (2004) by David Mitchell	Audie Award for Literary Fiction	Finalist	
2008	Selections from Dreamsongs 1 by George R.R. Martin	Audie Award for Science Fiction	Finalist	
2011	The Best Bad Luck I Ever Had by Kristin Levine	Amazing Audiobooks for Young Adults	Top 10	
2012	Rotters by Daniel Kraus	Odyssey Award	Winner	
2013	Heft by Liz Moore	Audie Award for Literary Fiction	Finalist	
2013	L.A. Noir by John Buntin	Audie Award for History or Biography	Finalist	
2014	The Invisible Heart by Russell D. Roberts	Audie Award for Business and Personal Development	Finalist	
2014	Rumble by Ellen Hopkins	Listen-Up Award for Children’s/YA	Finalist	
2014	Rumble by Ellen Hopkins	Listen-Up Award for Audiobook Narrator of the Year	Finalist	
2014	Scowler (2013) by Daniel Kraus	Amazing Audiobooks for Young Adults	Top 10	
2014	Scowler (2013) by Daniel Kraus	Odyssey Award	Winner	
2015	Skink – No Surrender (2014) by Carl Hiaasen	Amazing Audiobooks for Young Adults	Top 10	
2016	All the Bright Places (2014) by Jennifer Niven	Audie Award for Young Adult Title	Finalist	
2016	Library of Souls (2014) by Ransom Riggs	Amazing Audiobooks for Young Adults	Top 10	
2016	Trollhunters by Guillermo del Toro and Daniel Kraus	Amazing Audiobooks for Young Adults	Top 10	
2017	Traffick by Ellen Hopkins	Amazing Audiobooks for Young Adults	Top 10	
2020	Charlotte's Web (1952) by E. B. White	Audie Award for Audiobook of the Year	Finalist	
2020	Charlotte's Web (1952) by E. B. White	Audie Award for Middle Grade Title	Winner	
2020	Dig by A. S. King	Amazing Audiobooks for Young Adults	Top 10	
2022	The Couch Potato by Jory John	Audie Award for Young Listeners' Title	Finalist	

=== "Best of" lists ===
Year	Title	List	Ref.
2006	The Young Man and the Sea (2004) by Rodman Philbrick	Selected Audiobooks for Young Adults	
2008	Genius by Jesse Kellerman	Booklist Editors' Choice: Media	
2010	Cosmic (2010) by Frank Cottrell-Boyce	AudioFile Best of Children's	
2011	Rotters by Daniel Kraus	Booklist Editors' Choice: Media	
2012	The Beginner's Goodbye (2012) by Anne Tyler	AudioFile Best of Fiction	
2012	Cosmic by Frank Cottrell Boyce	Amazing Audiobooks for Young Adults	
2012	Moon Over Manifest (2010) by Clare Vanderpool	Notable Children's Recordings	
2012	Rotters by Daniel Kraus	Amazing Audiobooks for Young Adults	
2012	Stay Awake: Stories (2012) by Dan Chaon	AudioFile Best of Fiction	
2013	Almost Perfect (2009) by Brian Katcher	Amazing Audiobooks for Young Adults	
2013	Ender's Game Alive by Orson Scott Card	AudioFile Best of Science Fiction	
2013	Heft by Liz Moore	RUSA Listen List	
2013	Scowler (2013) by Daniel Kraus	Booklist Editors' Choice: Audio for Youth	
2014	Hollow City (2014) by Ransom Riggs	AudioFile Best of Young Adult	
2014	Scowler (2013) by Daniel Kraus	Amazing Audiobooks for Young Adults	
2014	Scowler (2013) by Daniel Kraus	AudioFile Best of Young Adult	
2014	Those Darn Squirrels! by Adam Rubin	Notable Children's Videos	
2015	100 Sideways Miles by Andrew Smith	Booklist Editors' Choice: Audio for Youth	
2015	All the Bright Places (2014) by Jennifer Niven	Publishers Weekly Best Children's/YA Audiobooks	
2015	Goodbye Stranger (2015) by Rebecca Stead	AudioFile Best of Children's	
2015	Hollow City (2014) by Ransom Riggs	Amazing Audiobooks for Young Adults	
2015	The Madman of Piney Woods	Notable Children's Recordings	
2015	Me and Earl and the Dying Girl (2012) by Jesse Andrews	AudioFile Best of Young Adult	
2015	Noggin by John Corey Whaley	Amazing Audiobooks for Young Adults	
2015	Old Wolf (2015) by Avi	AudioFile Best of Children's	
2015	Skink – No Surrender (2014) by Carl Hiaasen	Booklist Editors' Choice: Audio for Youth	
2016	100 Sideways Miles by Andrew Smith	Amazing Audiobooks for Young Adults	
2016	All the Bright Places (2014) by Ariadne Meyers	Amazing Audiobooks for Young Adults	
2016	Crown of Three by J.D. Rinehart	Amazing Audiobooks for Young Adults	
2016	Mister Monkey (2016) by Francine Prose	AudioFile Best of Fiction	
2017	The Bright Hour (2017) by Nina Riggs	AudioFile Best of Memoir	
2017	The Ethan I Was Before (2017) by Ali Standish	AudioFile Best of Children & Family Listening	
2017	Lincoln in the Bardo (2017) by George Saunders	Booklist Editors' Choice: Audio for Adults	
2018	The Dreadful Tale of Prosper Redding by Alexandra Bracken	Notable Children's Recordings	
2018	Lincoln in the Bardo (2017) by George Saunders	RUSA Listen List	
2019	Charlotte's Web (1952) by E. B. White	AudioFile Best of Children & Family Listening	
2020	Charlotte’s Web (1952) by E.B. White	Notable Children's Recordings	
2020	Roller Girl (2015) by Victoria Jamieson	Amazing Audiobooks for Young Adults	
2020	Two Can Keep a Secret by Karen M. McManus	Amazing Audiobooks for Young Adults	
2022	Donuts and Other Proclamations of Love by Jared Reck	Amazing Audiobooks for Young Adults	

== Works ==
=== Filmography ===
- Social Suicide (2001) - Tuff Christopherson
- The Singles Ward (2002) - Dalen Martin
- The R.M. (2003) - Jared Phelps
- The Work and the Story (2003) - Ephraim Thomas
- Saints and Soldiers (2003) - Flight Sergeant Oberon Winley
- The Book of Mormon Movie, Vol. 1: The Journey (2003) - Sam
- The Best Two Years (2003) - Elder Hezekiah Calhoun
- Everwood (2003) - Mr. Perkins
- Hoops (2004) - Ethan
- Sons of Provo (2004) - Kirby Laybourne
- The Last Chapter (2004) - Jonathan
- Pirates of the Great Salt Lake (2006) - Kirk Redgrave/Nose Beard
- Lazy Muncie (2006) - Himself
- Free Ride (2006) - Dylan Hudney
- Take a Chance (2006) - Eugene Buddles
- Praise to the Man (2006) - Oliver Cowdery
- Together Again for the First Time (2008) - Roger Wolders
- The Singles 2nd Ward (2007) - Dalen Martin
- Scout Camp (2009) - Kerry
- Midway to Heaven (also known as Heaven Is Waiting) (2011) - David
- The Three Stooges (2012) - Teddy
- Sorry (2013)
- The Client List (2013, TV series, season 1 episode 7)
- Extinct (2017, TV series) - voice of Red Drone
- Faith of Angels (2024)

=== Discography ===
- Inside - (2005)
- Braver Days ( May 2006)
- Merry White Tree in the Night (Oct 2006)
- The RM Soundtrack - "If You Could Hie to Kolob"
- Sons of Provo Soundtrack
- The Gone Away World by Nick Harkaway - Narrator (2008)
- Nick & Norah's Infinite Playlist by Rachel Cohn & David Levithan - Narrator (2008)
- The Elm Tree - Released March 31, 2009
- The Long Walk by Stephen King writing as Richard Bachman - Narrator (2010)
- Fat Vampire by Adam Rex - Narrator (2010)
- Rotters by Daniel Kraus - Narrator (2011)
- Everybody Sees the Ants by A. S. King - Narrator (2012)
- Come to Zion, Vol. 1: The Winds and the Waves by Dean Hughes - Narrator (2012)
- Gone Girl by Gillian Flynn - Narrator (with Julia Whelan) (2012)
- Scowler by Daniel Kraus - Narrator (2013)
- Breathe by Abbi Glines - Narrator (2013)
- Taipei by Tao Lin - Narrator (2013)
- Come to Zion, Vol. 2: Through Cloud and Sunshine by Dean Hughes - Narrator (2013)
- Fifteen Minutes by Karen Kingsbury - Narrator (2013)
- Hollow City by Ransom Riggs - Narrator (2014)
- Rumble by Ellen Hopkins - Narrator (2014)
- The Family of Jesus by Karen Kingsbury - Narrator (with January LaVoy) (2014)
- Angels Walking by Karen Kingsbury - Narrator (with January LaVoy) (2014)
- A Generation Rising (Fire and Steel, Vol. 1) by Gerald N. Lund - Narrator (2014)
- Only the Brave: The Continuing Story of the San Juan Pioneers by Gerald N. Lund - Narrator (2014)
- Come to Zion, Vol. 3: Fresh Courage Take by Dean Hughes - Narrator (2014)
- Ashfall by Mike Mullin - Narrator (2015)
- All the Bright Places by Jennifer Niven - Narrator (2015)
- The Friends of Jesus by Karen Kingsbury - Narrator (with January LaVoy) (2015)
- Chasing Sunsets (Angels Walking, book 2) by Karen Kingsbury - Narrator (with January LaVoy) (2015)
- The Orphan Army: The Nightsiders, book 1 by Jonathan Maberry - Narrator (2015)
- The Storm Descends (Fire and Steel, Vol. 2) by Gerald N. Lund - Narrator (2015)
- Library of Souls by Ransom Riggs - Narrator (2015)
- Fires of Invention (Mysteries of Cove, Vol. 1) by Jeffrey Scott Savage - Narrator (2015)
- Youngblood by Matt Gallagher - Narrator (2016)
- To Soar with Eagles by Gerald N. Lund - Narrator (2016)
- Brush of Wings (Angels Walking, book 3) by Karen Kingsbury - Narrator (with January LaVoy) (2016)
- The Shadow Falls (Fire and Steel, Vol. 3) by Gerald N. Lund - Narrator (2016)
- Gears of Revolution (Mysteries of Cove, Vol. 2) by Jeffrey Scott Savage - Narrator (2016)
- A Baxter Family Christmas (The Baxters) by Karen Kingsbury - Narrator (with January LaVoy) (2016)
- Dragonwatch: A Fablehaven Adventure (Dragonwatch, Vol. 1) by Brandon Mull - Narrator (2017)
- The Proud Shall Stumble (Fire and Steel, Vol. 4) by Gerald N. Lund - Narrator (2017)
- Love Story (The Baxters) by Karen Kingsbury - Narrator (with January LaVoy) (2017)
- In This Moment (The Baxters) by Karen Kingsbury - Narrator (with January LaVoy) (2017)
- Embers of Destruction (Mysteries of Cove, Vol. 3) by Jeffrey Scott Savage - Narrator (2017)
- Out of the Smoke (Fire and Steel, Vol. 5) by Gerald N. Lund - Narrator (2018)
- ’’I Am Not A Serial Killer (John Cleaver, Vol. 1)’’ by Dan Wells - Narrator (2018)
- Dragonwatch: Wrath of the Dragon King (Dragonwatch, Vol. 2) by Brandon Mull - Narrator (2018)
- A Map of Days by Ransom Riggs - Narrator (2018)
- To the Moon and Back (The Baxters) by Karen Kingsbury - Narrator (with January LaVoy) (2018)
- When We Were Young (The Baxters) by Karen Kingsbury - Narrator (with January LaVoy) (2018)
- Two Weeks (The Baxters) by Karen Kingsbury - Narrator (with January LaVoy) (2019)
- Into the Flames (Fire and Steel, Vol. 6) by Gerald N. Lund - Narrator (2019)
- Muddy: Where Faith and Polygamy Collide (Muddy, Vol. 1) by Dean Hughes - Narrator (2019)
- Dragonwatch: Master of the Phantom Isle (Dragonwatch, Vol. 3) by Brandon Mull - Narrator (2019)
- River: Where Faith and Consecration Converge (Muddy, Vol. 2) by Dean Hughes - Narrator (2020)
- The Volunteer Effect by Jason Young and Jonathan Malm - Narrator (2020)
- Dragonwatch: Champion of the Titan Games (Dragonwatch, Vol. 4) by Brandon Mull - Narrator (2020)
- Someone Like You (The Baxters) by Karen Kingsbury - Narrator (with January LaVoy) (2020)
- Truly, Madly Deeply (The Baxters) by Karen Kingsbury - Narrator (with January LaVoy) (2020)
- A Distant Shore by Karen Kingsbury - Narrator (with January LaVoy) (2021)
- Dragonwatch: Return of the Dragon Slayers (Dragonwatch, Vol. 5) by Brandon Mull - Narrator (2021)
