= Trek: The Movie =

- Directed by: Alan Peterson
- Written by: David Howard; Jongiorgi Enos
- Produced by: David Howard; Alan Peterson
- Starring: Austin Grant; Joel Bishop; Stefania Barr; Clint Pulver; Ryan Mitchel Brown
- Music by: Peter Murray
- Distributed by: Purdie Distribution; Excel Entertainment Group
- Release date: June 4, 2018
- Running time: 102 minutes
- Country: United States
- Language: English

Trek: The Movie is a 2018 comedy film. It was written and produced by David Howard (Galaxy Quest) and directed by Alan Peterson. The film is distributed by Excel Entertainment Group—the distributors of 17 Miracles, The Work and the Glory, and The Cokeville Miracle.

The film with a runtime of 120 mins follows a young Mormon teenager named Tom and his friends on their handcart journey. Along the way they try to smuggle in unsanctioned food, battle sibling rivalry, encounter a "special ops" Young Men's leader, match wits with a twinkie-loving skunk, and ponder doctrinal brain teasers like, "Do general Authorities go to PG-13 movies?" But, when they encounter unexpected trouble, their faith is tested much like their pioneer ancestors. The film depicts "Trek" as a sort of Mormon rite of passage.

== Cast ==
The cast includes Joel Bishop (Saints and Soldiers), Clint Pulver (Saturday's Warrior), and Ali Durham (12 Gifts of Christmas).

- Austin Grant - Tom Jensen
- Joel Bishop - Bob Pratt
- Stefania Barr - Anna McDowell
- Clint Pulver - Brad
- Ryan Brown - Sterling Bennett
- Spencer Loftus - Bobby Murray
- Avery Pizzutoo - Susan
- Spencer Marsh - Lehi Johnson
- Duy Beck - White Water Rafter
- Michael Behrens - Jesse Crabbe
- T.J. Bishop - Bonfire Dancer #4
- Chris Equizabal - Mike Sandoval
- Bill Gillane - Grandpa
- Caden Gregoire - Kent Pratt
- Devin Hansen - Youth Leader
- Emily McLean - Washtub Bass Player
- Eric Millward - Trek Pa
- Cathy Tidwell - Trek Ma
- Allie Rae Treharne - Lisa
- AmberLee Wilson - Amanda Peterson

== Music ==
The film includes music from local Utah bands including Shrink the Giant.

== See also ==
- LDS cinema
