= One Hundred Years of Mormonism =

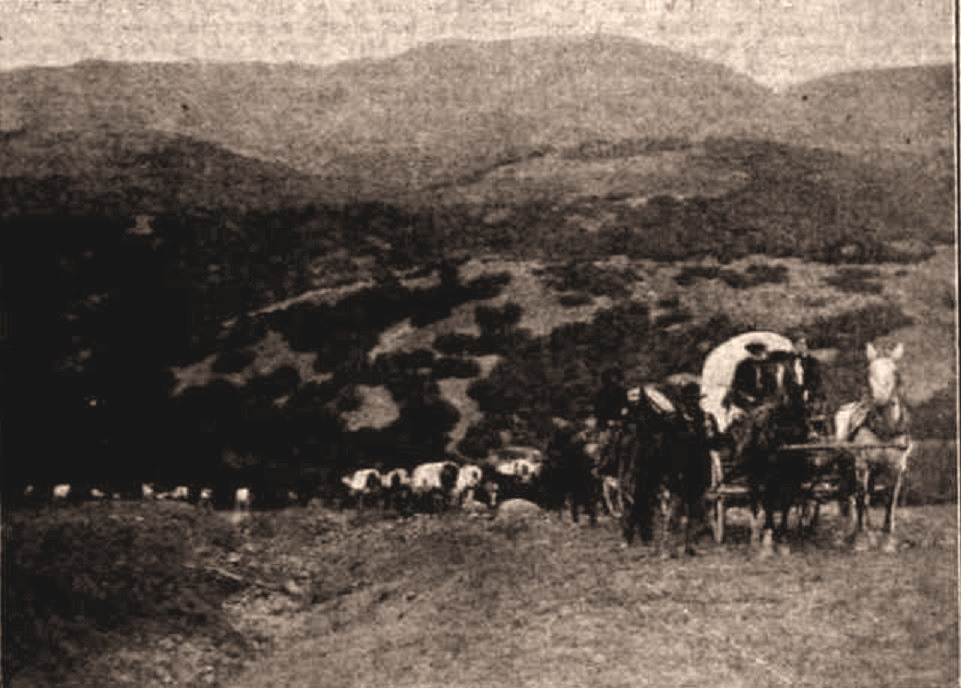
- Directed by: Norval MacGregor
- Written by: Nell Shipman; Harry A. Kelly
- Produced by: Harry A. Kelly
- Starring: Frank Young
- Release date: 1913
- Running time: Six reels
- Country: United States

One Hundred Years of Mormonism is a 1913 film depicting the early history of the Church of Jesus Christ of Latter-day Saints. The six-reel film took its title from the 1905 book by Mormon educator John Henry Evans. Ellaye Motion Picture Company was originally contracted by the church's leadership to produce the film, but the company broke its contract and was replaced by the Utah Moving Picture Company, with prominent screenwriter Nell Shipman completing the screenplay for a then-unprecedented fee of $2,500. Filming took place on locations across California and Utah. The filming locations in Utah were Salt Lake City, Daniel's Pass, and Heber.

The film premiered at the Salt Lake Theatre in Salt Lake City, Utah, on February 3, 1913. Although church apostle James E. Talmage would later write that the film contained "many crudities and historical inaccuracies," it was well received by Mormon audiences.

No print of the film is known to survive and it is now considered to be a lost film.

== See also ==
- LDS cinema
- LDS movies
