= Inspired Guns =

- Directed by: Adam White
- Written by: Adam White
- Produced by: Michael Hardle; Jarrod Phillips
- Starring: Shona Kay; Dashiell Wolf; Jarrod Phillips; Rick Macy; Charan Prabhakar; Christian Busath; Alix Maria Taulbee
- Distributed by: Pitch White Entertainment
- Release date: January 24, 2014
- Running time: 99 minutes
- Country: United States
- Language: English
- Budget: $175,000

Inspired Guns is a 2014 comedy film. It was written, directed, and produced by Adam White, who also plays a role in the film. It is distributed by Pitch White Entertainment. Most of the cast and crew are members of the Church of Jesus Christ of Latter-day Saints and one of the stated goals of the movie is to "create good clean content" for family audiences.

The film is about two Mormon missionaries who begin teaching members of the mafia who think the young men are messengers from "The Boss" with a hidden message regarding an upcoming hit.

== Story ==
The last thing Elder Fisher expects when he and his brand-new companion, Elder Johnson, hit the city streets is a couple of seemingly golden prospects. But dimwitted brothers Roger and Larry, low-level Mafioso, think the two Mormon missionaries who approach them have been sent by the "Boss" to deliver their next assignment. So the brothers are willing to listen to anything the young men in dark suits have to say—including a message of salvation—even if Elder Johnson is the most overconfident and underprepared missionary to ever attempt to preach the word of God. Soon the witless brothers are searching through the Book of Mormon in a quest to find a hidden message. But as the missionaries and Roger and Larry continue to meet for discussions, both the mafia and the FBI have their sights set on Elders Fisher and Johnson. Now the mismatched elders must learn to rely on each other to survive their likely lethal case of mistaken identity.

== Main cast ==
- Shona Kay- Helen
- Dashiell Wolf- Elder Johnson
- David Lassetter as Elder Fisher
- Jarrod Phillips- Johnny "The Butcher" Rossi
- Rick Macy- Boss
- Charan Prabhakar- Smooth Talker
- Alix Maria Taulbee- Sister Reed
- Andrew W. Johnson- Dave
- Jake Suazo- Larry
- Christian Busath- Roger
- Johnny Ahn- Elder Okinawa
- Brett Merritt- Agent Knight
- Scott Beringer- Agent McNeil

== Box office ==
The film was made on a budget of $175,000. It debuted in limited theaters on January 24, 2014.

== See also ==
- LDS cinema
