= Church Ball =

American sports comedy film directed by Kurt Hale

- Directed by: Kurt Hale
- Written by: Paul Eagleston; Kurt Hale; Stephen Rose
- Produced by: George Dayton; Kurt Hale; Dave Hunter
- Starring: Fred Willard; Andrew Wilson; Clint Howard; Gary Coleman; Ross Brockley; Curt Dousett; Larry Bagby; Steve Anderson
- Cinematography: Billy Webb
- Edited by: Wynn Hougaard; John Lyde
- Distributed by: Halestorm Entertainment
- Release date: March 17, 2006
- Running time: 91 minutes
- Country: United States
- Language: English
- Budget: $1,000,000
- Box office: $464,991

Church Ball is a 2006 sports comedy film written and directed by Kurt Hale. It follows an underdog Latter-day Saint church basketball team and their attempts to make it to the championship in the league's last season. The film stars Andrew Wilson, Fred Willard, Clint Howard, and Gary Coleman. The film received negative reviews from critics and was a box office failure that earned just $464,991 against a $1 million dollar budget.

== Plot ==
A local Utah LDS Church holds the record as having the worst basketball team in the church ball league. The team has failed to make it into the church tournament in the past 20 years. Due to rumors of this being the last year of the league, former team coach, and now Bishop Linderman (Fred Willard) has called Dennis Buckstead (Andrew Wilson) to coach a team made of clumsy misfits to the championship.

Church expectations of brotherly love, sportsmanship, and fellowship fall prey to competitive fierceness in the effort to win, while Dennis works to bring unity and cooperation.

== Cast ==
- Andrew Wilson as Dennis Buckstead
- Fred Willard as Bishop Linderman
- Clint Howard as Gene Jensen
- Gary Coleman as Charles Higgins
- Amy Stewart as Susan Buckstead

== Production ==
=== Development and casting ===
The original script for the film was written years beforehand by Kurt Hale, Paul Eagleston, and Stephen Rose. Halestorm Entertainment began production of the film in 2005. Gary Coleman was cast as Charles Higgins. Andrew Wilson, Clint Howard, and Fred Willard were later cast as Dennis Buckstead, Gene Jensen, and Bishop Linderman, respectively.

=== Filming ===
Filming took place primarily in Orem and Provo, Utah in 2005. The former Douglas Ward meetinghouse at 721 S 1200 E in Salt Lake City and the former Wallsburg meetinghouse in Wallsburg were both used for filming.

During filming, Gary Coleman met his wife, Shannon Price, on set who was an extra in the film.

== Release ==
=== Theatrical ===
Church Ball was released in theaters on March 17, 2006, by Halestorm Entertainment.

=== Home media ===
On September 26, 2006, Church Ball was released on DVD by Stone Five Studios.

== Reception ==
=== Box office ===
Church Ball opened on March 17, 2006, with $144,376. The film was a box office failure that ended grossing just $464,991 against a $1,000,000 budget.

=== Critical response ===
The review aggregator website Rotten Tomatoes surveyed twelve critics and reported a 17 percent approval rating. Among the reviews, it determined an average rating of 4.3 out of 10. It received a 39% approval rating from audiences.

Jeff Vice of the Deseret News wrote in his review: "t's hard to tell whether the jokes in "Church Ball" are any funnier than those in earlier HaleStorm movie productions — The Singles Ward, The R.M. and The Home Teachers." William Arnold of the Seattle Post-Intelligencer wrote in his review: "Clearly, Mormon movies are not what they used to be. But Church Ball seems to be a complete break with the genre's missionary past. Ted Fry of the Seattle Times wrote in his review: "I have no idea whether Fred Willard is a Mormon, but thanks to his signature glib charm he plays one effortlessly as coach of an inept basketball team in Church Ball, a carefree, underdog sports comedy."

==== Actor's responses ====
Gary Coleman described his dissatisfaction with the film's quality. Although he stated he enjoyed the process of making the film, he remarked that watching the production process was like "giving monkeys cameras and lights." Despite this, the project introduced Coleman to Utah, and he moved to Santaquin soon after filming. He later commented that he was thankful to Kurt hale for introducing him to the state.

Clint Howard praised Halestorm Entertainment for producing family-friendly entertainment.
