= Down and Derby =

- Poster
- Directed by: Eric Hendershot
- Written by: Eric Hendershot
- Produced by: Josh Steele; Dickilyn Johnson
- Starring: Greg Germann; Lauren Holly; Pat Morita
- Cinematography: T.C. Christensen; Gordon Lonsdale
- Edited by: Tony Lombardo
- Music by: Chuck E. Meyers; Andrew Gross
- Distributed by: Excel Entertainment Group; Freestyle Releasing
- Release date: April 15, 2005
- Running time: 90 minutes
- Country: United States
- Language: English
- Budget: $20 million
- Box office: $14,688,349

Down and Derby (released as Racing Ace outside of North America) is a 2005 American comedy film written and directed by Eric Hendershot and starring Greg Germann, Lauren Holly, Adam Hicks, and Pat Morita. The movie was filmed outside St. George, Utah.

The film was released to theatres and home video in 2005. Despite poor reviews and poor box office results, the film gained success on home video, giving it a slight cult following.

== Plot ==
Phil's wife Kim, the den mother of the local Cub Scout pack, gives a pinewood derby kit to each of the Cub Scouts. Although the boys are supposed to make their own cars from the kits, with appropriate adult supervision, the four dads obsessively take over the project, totally excluding the boys.

As each man becomes more and more obsessed with building the fastest car, their wives eventually become so annoyed that they leave the house, taking their sons with them. Soon, "Big Jimmy" is the first to break secrecy to talk to Blaine, and the two of them then talk to Phil, showing him on the title page of the Pinewood Derby Bible that Ace Montana is the author. Not only that, but the car Ace built as an eight-year-old boy in California still holds the record for the fastest pinewood derby car on record.

The three men decide to collaborate to build one car that will beat Ace's record. To this end, they steal Ace's original car to reverse-engineer it, finding out that Ace's real name is Stacy Lynn, but are nearly caught in the act of returning it. The three men then succeed in building a fast car that will break the record, and Blaine and Jimmy decide that Phil should have the honor of having his son enter the car in the competition.

At the Derby, the men and their wives are re-united. Kim tells Phil that their son Brady (Adam Hicks) has built his own car while staying with his grandfather, with advice from grandpa's neighbor, and she challenges him to "do the right thing". After some soul-searching, Phil passes up the car the three men built and allows Brady to register his car for the race – but "Big Jimmy" still wants to beat Ace, and takes the car for his son to enter.

After several races, the competition comes down to six finalists, including Ace's, Brady's, and the car the three men built. In the final race their car is leading the pack but loses a wheel. Ace's car then takes the lead, but on the flat part of the track, Brady's car takes the lead and finishes first, setting a new pinewood derby record. Ace is shocked but makes a gesture of congratulating the Davises; still, the minute he leaves the room, he throws a temper tantrum.

When Phil asks Brady who grandpa's neighbor was who gave him advice, Brady points out a man in the audience, who turns out to be the man in the instructional video Phil has been watching to help design his car.

== Cast ==
- Greg Germann as Phil Davis, the guy who used to be number one, but was bumped to second place when Ace Montana moved to town.
  - Jared Wyson as Young Phil
- Lauren Holly as Kim Davis, wife of Phil, who gets fed up with Phil's obsession with the pinewood derby.
- Pat Morita as Uno Yakimoto, owner of Yakimoto company. Phil, focused on the derby, neglects to develop the Yakimoto ad campaign.
- Adam Hicks as Brady Davis, son of Phil and Kim; he wants to help with the derby car, but is not allowed.
- Marc Raymond as Ace Montana, Phil's rival, who seems better than Phil at everything.
  - Joseph McKay as Young Ace
- Hunter Tylo as Teri Montana; wife of Ace Montana.
- Danny Shepherd as Danny Scaldoni, Big Jimmy's son, a friend of Brady Davis.
- Perry Anzilotti as Big Jimmy, a short but tough friend/rival of Phil's.
  - Kyle Broadhead as Young Big Jimmy
- Robert Costanzo as Claude, a friend of Phil Davis who is working hard at the derby racing.
- Michael Glauser as Claude's Son
- Sandy Hackett as Larry Savage, Phil's boss; he threatens to fire Phil from his job.
- Scott Christopher as Delivery Guy, a neighbour of Phil Davis.
- Carmen Ramusen as Marilyn, the dentist's wife who, like Kim, is fed up with her husband's derby plan.
- Deborah Ashton as Angel Scaldoni
- Ross Brockley as Blaine Moosman
  - Cameron Mainwaring as Young Blaine
- Tammy Lier as Charlotte Moosman
- Nicholas Nengas as Todd Moosman
- Eric Jacobs as A.J. Montana

The creator of the pinewood derby, Don Murphy, makes a cameo appearance in the film.

== Reception ==
=== Box office ===
The film was not a box office success. It only grossed $14,688,349 in worldwide box office receipts, including $11,003,454 at U.S. theaters.

=== Critical reception ===
The review aggregator website Rotten Tomatoes surveyed 27 critics and assessed 6 as positive and 21 as negative for a 22 percent rating. Among the reviews, it determined an average rating of 4.00 out of 10. The critics consensus reads "Dull, predictable family fare."

== See also ==
- Pinewood derby
