= Believe (2007 film) =

- Film poster
- Directed by: Loki Mulholland
- Written by: Loki Mulholland
- Produced by: Micah Merrill; Russ Kendall
- Starring: Adam Pendon; Lincoln Hoppe; K. Danor Gerald; Jeff Olson; Brian Clark; Britani Bateman; Steve Anderson; Ann Bosler; Craig Clyde; Jodi Russel; Vanessa DeHart; Graham Russell; Troy Dunn
- Distributed by: Kaleidoscope Pictures
- Release date: April 20, 2007

Believe is a 2007 mockumentary/comedy about the world of multi-level marketing (MLM). This is the first movie by director Loki Mulholland, who is also credited for the screenplay.

Believe was produced by Russ Kendall and Micah Merrill of Kaleidoscope Pictures.

== Plot ==
Set in the town of Springfield, Believe tells the story of Adam Pendon (Larry Bagby), a struggling truck driver who was recently laid off from his job at the steel mill when it closed. Adam is approached by a salesman for a multi-level marketing company, Believe Industries. The salesman, Mark Fuller (Lincoln Hoppe), offers Adam a business opportunity.

Adam agrees to meet Mark at a local hotel for the business meeting. This meeting is filled with distributors for Believe Industries, such as Dan Bretenheirmer (Steve Anderson) and Sally Bretenheirmer (Ann Bosler) who are unable to succeed at Believe, even though they sincerely try to work the program. Tom (Brian Neal Clark) and Amy Hawks (Britani Bateman) are a focused couple who also meet Adam.

The owner of Believe is Howard Flash (Jeff Olson), who claims to have lived in a trailer park until the business of Believe saved his life and made him wealthy.

Adam decides to join Believe and succeeds unexpectedly. He is invited to be a speaker at a Believe convention. The crux of the plot is Adam at a crossroads of either enjoying wealth and fame from Believe or walking away because he believes he is misleading other people with his wealth and fame.

== Cast ==
- Larry Bagby : Adam Pendon
- Lincoln Hoppe : Mark Fuller
- Vanessa DeHart : Jean Pendon
- Brian Clark : Tom Hawks
- Britani Bateman : Amy Hawks
- Steve Anderson : Dan Bretenheimer
- Ann Bosler : Sally Bretenheimer
- Jeff Olson : Howard Flash
- Craig Clyde : Mitch Harris
- Jodi Russell : Betty Fuller
- J. Scott Bronson : Dr. Bronson
- Curt Dousett : John Miller
- K. Danor Gerald : Ray Sterago
- Leilani Marshall : Lola
- Dutch Whitlock : Chris Bretenheimer
- Graham Russell : John Loch
- Morgan Lund : Reverend Goldsmith
- Jimmy Chunga : Himself

== Background ==
For four years, Mulholland was a distributor for Amway, one of the most well-known MLM companies in the world.

== See also ==
- List of ghost films
