= Britani Bateman =

American actress, singer, and television personality

- Bateman in 2026
- Born: Britani Martin; June 1, 1971 (age 55); Provo, Utah
- Education: Brigham Young University (BFA)
- Occupations: Actress; singer; television personality
- Known for: The Real Housewives of Salt Lake City
- Spouses: J Michael Bateman (m. 1997, divorced) John Scott Pace Underwood (m. 2016–2023)
- Children: 2
- Website: https://www.britanibateman.com

Britani Bateman (née Martin) is an American actress, singer, and television personality. She is best known as a cast member of the Bravo reality television series The Real Housewives of Salt Lake City.

== Personal life ==
Bateman was born in Provo, Utah to parents Mort and Catrina and raised in Folsom, California. As a child, she performed with her parents and four siblings in a musical group called the Martins. Bateman graduated from Brigham Young University with a Bachelor of Fine Arts. She has two daughters. Throughout 2024 and 2025, Bateman was involved in a public on-again, off-again relationship with Jared Osmond, nephew of Donny and Marie Osmond. In February 2026, Bateman announced that the couple had permanently ended their relationship.

== Career ==
Bateman's acting career began at BYU, where she toured with the Young Ambassadors, starring in roles such as Reno Sweeney in Anything Goes. Upon graduating, Bateman became a stage performer at Walt Disney World, performing as Disney Princesses Ariel and Belle. This was followed by a nine-month stint at Tokyo Disneyland. She was also on the 2nd National Tour for the musical Miss Saigon in the role of Ellen in 1999. Bateman's film career started with her appearance in The R.M. in 2003. She later starred alongside Tori Spelling in the ABC Family Original Movie, The Mistle-Tones in 2012. In August 2024, Bateman was announced to join The Real Housewives of Salt Lake City as a "friend of the housewives".

In December 2024, Bateman released a Christmas EP, in which she covers songs including "Oh Holy Night", "Jingle Bells", and "What Child Is This?".

Bateman made her cabaret debut with What About Me: An Evening with Britani Bateman in December 2025. The show was held at 54 Below in New York City and was music-directed by Steven Jamail. In April 2026, she performed a second cabaret-style concert, Ting! Ting! Ting!, at The Depot in Salt Lake City.

In July 2026, Bateman released the single "What About Me". The following month, she performed the song during a guest-hosting appearance on Good Things Utah. That October, she joined the lineup for The Voices That Raised Us, a one-night charity cabaret at The Green Room 42 in New York City benefiting Broadway Cares.

== Filmography ==
Year	Title	Role	Notes
2026	Good Things Utah	Herself	Guest host
2026	American Idol	Herself	Guest appearance; 1 episode
2024–present	The Real Housewives of Salt Lake City	Herself	Recurring (season 5–present)
2024–2026	Watch What Happens Live with Andy Cohen	Herself	Guest; 3 episodes
2014	The Last Straw	Paula	
2013	Friend Request	Nurse 2	
2013	Skinwalker Ranch	Lab Tech Michelle	
2012	Disjointed Custody	Mommy	Short film
2012	The Mistle-Tones	Staci	TV movie
2009	The Yankles	Veronica	
2008	The Eleventh Hour	News Reporter	
2008	Forever Strong	Renee Tate	
2007	Believe	Amy Hawks	
2006	Love Surreal	Verna	TV movie
2005	Mobsters and Mormons	Kate Jaymes	
2004	Sons of Provo	Award Recipient	
2004	Pixel Perfect	Host	TV movie
2003	The R.M.	Kelly Powers	

== Discography ==
Credits are adapted from Spotify and Apple Music.

=== As lead artist ===
==== Extended plays ====
Title	Details
Britani's Holiday EP	Released: December 7, 2024; Label: Self-released; Format: Digital download, streaming; Track listing: 1. "What Child Is This?"; 2. "Jingle Bells"; 3. "Oh Holy Night"

==== Singles ====
Title	Details
"What About Me"	Released: July 24, 2026; Label: Self-released; Format: Digital download, streaming

=== As featured artist ===
==== Singles ====
Year	Title	Album
2012	"A Light in the Dark (from 'Next to Normal')" (Dallyn Vail Bayles featuring Britani Bateman)	Some Enchanted Evening
2012	"In Whatever Time We Have (from 'Children of Eden')" (Dallyn Vail Bayles featuring Britani Bateman)	Some Enchanted Evening
