= Hale Centre Theatre (Utah) =

Theater in Sandy, Utah

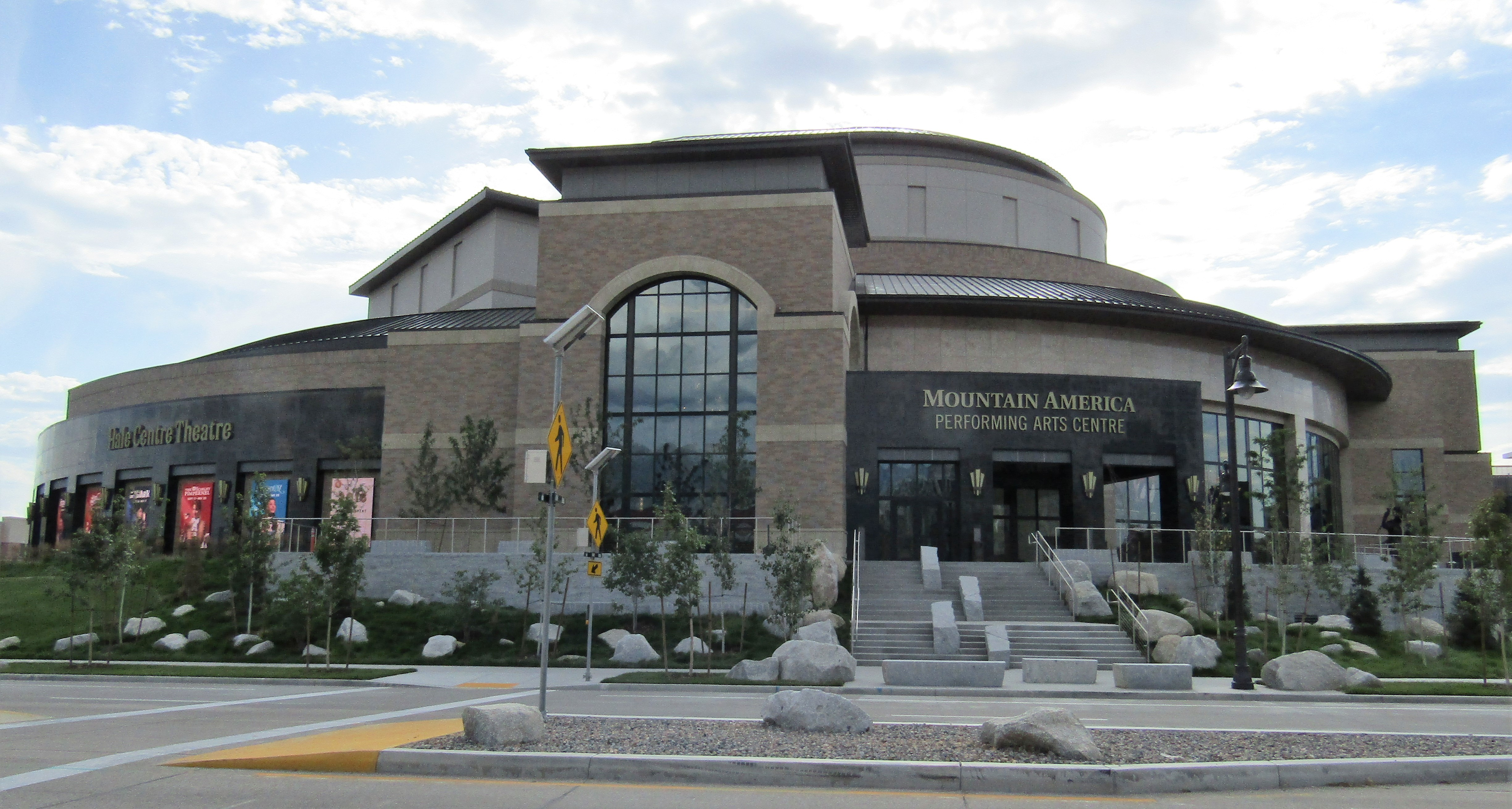
- The Mountain America Performing Arts Centre, home of the Hale Centre Theatre in Sandy, Utah
- Interactive map of Hale Centre Theatre
- Location: 9900 South Monroe Street, Sandy UT 84070
- Coordinates: 40.5717532°N 111.9004454°W
- Capacity: 467 - Sorensen Legacy Jewel Box Stage; 911 - Young Living Centre Stage

Website
- Hale Centre Theatre

Hale Centre Theatre is a theater company based in Sandy, Utah.

The theater has two stages: the Sorensen Legacy Jewel Box Stage with a capacity of 467 people, and the Young Living Center Stage with a capacity of 911.

== History ==
In 1985, with assistance from their family, Ruth and Nathan Hale converted an old lingerie factory in South Salt Lake into a theater-in-the-round with 220 seats. Over time, the capacity expanded up to 387 seats. In 1998, the theater moved to a new facility in West Valley City through a partnership with the city. The theater relocated for the last time to Sandy in 2017 due to another municipal partnership. Currently, the location at Sandy is the home of the Hale Centre Theatre at the Mountain America Performing Arts Center.

The Hales were asked to be drama leaders in their Mormon congregation in Granger, Utah. They decided to write their own plays because they did not have the money to pay for royalties on existing ones. Their plays were soon performed in other Mormon congregations. Eventually, the Hales were invited to perform one of their plays at Brigham Young University.

During World War II, the Hales moved to California. Nathan tried to find work at the Pasadena Playhouse, but the Playhouse only accepted actors and actresses from nearby studios and ones the company had worked with previously. The Hales returned to performing their plays for local Mormon congregations until a talent agent scouted Nathan.

When Nathan's opportunity fell through, the Hales started their own theater in Glendale, California called the Glendale Center. It seated 110 people. Eventually, the Hales decided to go back to Granger and build another theater by selling land left to Ruth by her father and with financial assistance from their family.

== Productions ==
The Hale Centre Theatre produces musical and traditional theater such as Joseph and the Amazing Technicolor Dream Coat (performed in 2017), The Scarlet Pimpernel Musical (2018) and The Heart of Robin Hood (2017).

Other locations, such as one in Pleasant Grove, Utah, and another in Hale Centre Theatre (Arizona), are owned by the Hales' children and grandchildren.
