= The Work and the Story =

2003 film by Nathan Smith Jones

- Directed by: Nathan Smith Jones
- Written by: Nathan Smith Jones; Dan Merkley
- Produced by: Miriam Smith
- Starring: Nathan Smith Jones; Jen Hoskins; Eric Artel; Dan Merkley; Richard Dutcher
- Music by: Big Idea Music
- Distributed by: Off-Hollywood Distribution
- Release date: August 15, 2003
- Running time: 77 minutes
- Country: United States
- Language: English
- Budget: $103,000

The Work and the Story is a 2003 Mormon mockumentary comedy film written and directed by Nathan Smith Jones and starring Nathan Smith Jones, Jen Hoskins, Eric Artel, Dan Merkley, and Richard Dutcher. The title of the film is a reference to the Mormon-oriented film The Work and the Glory.

== Plot ==
The story takes place just after the fictional disappearance of Richard Dutcher, famous for beginning the current Mormon cinema phase with his work God's Army. After Dutcher's disappearance the film follows the journeys of three amateur filmmakers who are eager to take his place as the first "Mormon Steven Spielberg". One of these filmmakers doesn't want to see Dutcher found.

== Production ==
Richard Dutcher donated the 16mm film stock to make the film. This is the same stock (three years-old) that God's Army was going to be shot on, had Dutcher not found the financing to shoot on 35mm.
