= Halestorm Entertainment =

American film production company

Halestorm Entertainment was a film production and distribution company based in Orem, Utah. It was founded in January 2001 by Kurt Hale and Dave Hunter, who were both film majors at Brigham Young University. Halestorm films were largely created by, for, and about Latter-day Saints and usually contain a high number of clichés and stereotypes about the behavior and culture of mainland Western United States members of the Church. Because of that, their films are mostly shown in first run movie theatres in that region, where most US members of that church live.

The company started with a successful first film, The Singles Ward, released in 2002. However, with a major box office failure in The Home Teachers it faced a declining market for explicitly Mormon-themed comedy films. In response, Halestorm phased out of producing explicitly LDS-based films with Church Ball sporting fewer in-jokes and named talent in an attempt to gain a wider audience.

The company was quietly dissolved in 2020 after years of inactivity. Currently, Deseret Book controls most of their library.

== Film library ==
=== Feature films ===
- The Singles Ward (2002)
- The Best Two Years (2003)
- The Book of Mormon Movie, Vol. 1: The Journey (2003)
- It's Latter-day Night! (2003)
- The R.M. (2003)
- Baptists at Our Barbecue (2004)
- The Home Teachers (2004)
- Sons of Provo (2004)
- Mobsters and Mormons (2005)
- Suits on the Loose (2005)
- Latter-Day Night Biscuit (2005)
- Take a Chance (2006)
- Church Ball (2006)
- The Singles 2nd Ward (2007)
- The Dance (2007)
- Beau Jest (2008)
- The Wild Stallion (2009)
- A Christmas Wish (2010)
- Heaven's Door (2012)
- Storm Rider (2013)

=== Short films ===
- Money or Mission (2006)
- Sons of Provo: Confidential (2007)

=== Television ===
- Howdy Town (2006–2007)

=== Documentaries ===
- Happy Valley (2008)
- The Real Life Singles Ward (2011)

== Divisions ==
- HaleYeah! Records: the music division at HaleStorm.
- Stone Five Studios: a sister company of HaleStorm, whose purpose is to produce family-friendly films not in the LDS genre.
- HaleStone Distribution: distributor of films and DVDs of other, smaller studios.
- HaleMark Publishing: a book imprint for novelizations of films and children's books.

== Production studio ==
In May 2005, HaleStorm broke ground on a full-service production and post-production facility in Provo, Utah. The studio will be the only commercially available studio soundstages in the state since the Osmond Studios.
