= The Best Two Years =

- DVD Release poster
- Directed by: Scott S. Anderson
- Written by: Scott S. Anderson
- Produced by: Michael Flynn; Scott S. Anderson; Fred Danneman
- Starring: K.C. Clyde; Kirby Heyborne; David Nibley; Cameron Hopkin; Scott Christopher; Michael Flynn
- Cinematography: Gordon C. Lonsdale
- Edited by: Wynn Hougaard
- Music by: John Batdorf; Michael McLean; Scott McLean
- Production company: Harvest Films
- Distributed by: Halestorm Entertainment
- Release date: 2003
- Running time: 112 minutes
- Countries: United States; Netherlands
- Language: English
- Budget: $400,000
- Box office: $1,163,450

The Best Two Years is a 2003 American comedy-drama film written and directed by Scott S. Anderson. It is based on the stage play The Best Two Years of My Life, also by Anderson. It portrays the experience of four LDS missionaries living in an apartment in the city of Haarlem in the Netherlands. The stage play had one setting, the apartment of the missionaries. The movie expands upon the play's setting, with some filming taking place in the Netherlands, but much of the movie still takes place in the apartment.

The writer, Scott Anderson, and producer, Michael Flynn, perceive this movie as a comedy. Others see this movie as a drama. The movie has elements of both.

== Featured cast ==
- K.C. Clyde as Elder John Rogers
- Kirby Heyborne as Elder Hezekiah Calhoun
- David Nibley as Elder Emmit Johnson
- Cameron Hopkin as Elder Steven Van Pelt
- Scott Christopher as Kyle Harrison
- Michael Flynn as President Sandburg (and producer)

== Plot ==
The Best Two Years portrays the experience of four missionaries of the Church of Jesus Christ of Latter-day Saints living in the same apartment in Haarlem in the Netherlands. The movie begins with Elder Rogers finding out that his new companion will be a "greenie", a newly trained missionary fresh from the Missionary Training Center. He and the other two missionaries that reside in the same apartment, Elder Johnson and Elder Van Pelt, go to the train station to meet the new elder. Elder Rogers finds out that the new missionary, Elder Calhoun, is exactly what he had jokingly predicted his new companion would be like.

Elder Rogers used to be an excellent missionary, until his girlfriend married one of his former mission companions. That is why he and the other two missionaries residing in the same apartment are surprised that the mission president has assigned him to be the trainer (first companion and mentor) to a missionary new to the mission.

The new missionary, Elder Calhoun, tackles mission work with unbounded enthusiasm. He attempts to talk to anyone although he has little knowledge of the Dutch language. Despite his poor Dutch, he maintains an eager attitude.

Fortunately for him, he soon encounters a man from the United States who speaks English. They speak briefly in the park before the man goes off with his girlfriend. Later, when he encounters the same man in a market, Calhoun gives him a Dutch Book of Mormon with his telephone number. Despite what the other three missionaries expect, the man does call and asks for Calhoun.

The man doesn't want to meet the missionaries in his own apartment because his roommates wouldn't understand. The missionaries arrange for him to meet them in their apartment. When he tries to give back the Book of Mormon because he doesn't read Dutch, they promptly give him one in English. The missionaries find out his name (Kyle Harrison) and teach him a discussion (short lesson) about Joseph Smith and Joseph's First Vision. Afterwards, Kyle shows sincere desire to learn more, so the missionaries schedule another discussion.

Tension has been building throughout the entire movie between Elder Johnson and Elder Van Pelt. Earlier, Johnson had received an audio tape from his girlfriend. He hasn't been able to play the tape for several days because Van Pelt had lent their tape player to a ward member. Also, Van Pelt is annoyed by Johnson's repeated use of the word "flip", as a mild substitute for any of a number of profane words. Johnson had told Van Pelt to hit him every time he used that word, but while waiting outside the apartment Johnson says it, and frustrated with Van Pelt for always hitting him, physically forces him to stop, showing his anger. This tension culminates outside of the missionary apartment just as Kyle is leaving from his first discussion. As he is leaving, Johnson and Van Pelt are looking in, hoping for him to leave soon. However, Johnson states: "Oh, flip! They're just standing around in there!" Forgetting Johnson's threats if he does so again, Van Pelt hits Johnson on the back. Johnson chases Van Pelt around, and eventually, as Kyle is on his way out of the door, Van Pelt enters and hides. Johnson quickly bursts in as well, smashing Kyle behind the door. He demands to know where Van Pelt is, and misunderstands most of what Rogers says and hears only, "Behind the door". He angrily starts to smash Kyle even more, until he realized what he just did. Rogers and Calhoun leave with Kyle out the door, but rush back in when they hear Van Pelt scream. They run in to see that Johnson has just hogtied Van Pelt with a rope when the mission president arrives in the apartment.

President Sandburg gives Johnson and Van Pelt a mild, but appropriate and effective, reprimand for their misbehavior. (Prescriptions were respectively Matthew 5:38-39 and 2 Nephi 9:42.) He recommends Elder Calhoun work on his Dutch, (Calhoun had, in Dutch, stated: "With all the walking and bike riding, my rear end has become quite beautiful."), and gently reprimands Rogers for not having written letters to his mother for a while, and persuades him to send at least one letter a week home for the remainder of his mission.

Things start to get worse for Elder Johnson when the president has to talk to him and Van Pelt decides to listen to his tape from his girlfriend. At the end of the tape, Johnson's girlfriend reveals she will marry a returned missionary after dating him for three weeks.

The second discussion with Kyle is followed by several more, again in the missionaries' apartment. He does decide to become a member of the Church. The baptism is scheduled for the Saturday just over a week from then. Kyle chooses Rogers to baptize him, to the great surprise of Rogers.

Johnson starts to resemble Elder Rogers when he starts to not do his work and jokingly says that the zone leaders are coming to promote Van Pelt because of Van Pelts' high hopes, like those Rogers had when his girlfriend broke up with him. Afterwards, Rogers convinces him to not do the same thing he did after Calhoun and Van Pelt leave for a store.

The baptism takes place in a river as scheduled, on the same day that Rogers is leaving for home. There are long good-byes at the train station. And in the station, with Rogers looking on from the train, Calhoun finally understands and speaks Dutch well.
