= Sons of Provo =

- Directed by: Will Swenson
- Written by: Peter Brown; Will Swenson
- Produced by: Peter Brown
- Starring: Will Swenson; Kirby Heyborne; Danny Tarasevich; Jennifer Erekson; Peter D. Brown; Maureen Eastwood
- Music by: Will Swenson; Kirby Heyborne
- Distributed by: Halestorm Entertainment
- Release date: 2004
- Running time: 93 minutes
- Language: English
- Budget: $200,000
- Box office: $120,488

Sons of Provo is a 2004 film written by Peter Brown and Will Swenson, and directed by Swenson. It is a mockumentary that portrays the experience of an LDS boy band named Everclean from formation to resounding success.

Sons of Provo made its official premiere at the inaugural SpudFest Family Film and Music Festival 2004 in Driggs, Idaho with Will Swenson, Kirby Heyborne, Danny Tarasevich, and Peter Brown present for the premiere.

== Plot ==
Will and Danny Jensen are the remaining members of an LDS boy-band from Provo, Utah that recently lost its third member because of "artistic reasons." After searching for a new third member, they decide on the star of a production of Forever Plaid at a local community theater. He turns them down without reservation. They then do an impromptu try-out of one of the costars, Kirby Laybourne, and recruit him for the group.

The group needs a manager, so Will and Danny hire their nephew, Grayson Jensen, for the job. The first gig he books for them is as the targets of a pie-throwing booth at a local fair. Their second gig is at a local wedding reception in a church gymnasium. The gig does not go well and the group argues with their manager during which the manager uses the words "fetchers", "flippin'", "heck" and "butt". Will tells him, "Watch your language!" The group fires Grayson and hires an old girlfriend of Kirby's who works at Provo Theatre Company, Jill Keith.

Meanwhile, Will has set up their next gig to perform at a local fireside. One of the men who hears them there has a recording studio in his house and offers to record their music so he asks, "What's your band's name?" They hold a brainstorming session in a park and come up with the name "Everkleen" (eventually shifting to the spelling, "Everclean.")

They hire a local ballet instructor, Yvonne Bolschweiler, as the group's choreographer.

After recording their first album, they begin to get some paying gigs. It doesn't take long until they have a tour starting in Salt Lake City, Utah and including Logan, Utah; Salem, Utah; and Moscow, Idaho. A review in the newspaper pans their performance, but is written in such a sophisticated way that they mistakenly believe it to be a good review.

At a performance at Utah State University, Kirby loses his CTR ring down a drain just before a performance, which hurts his performance. The band manager gets someone to take the drain apart and retrieve the ring, which she returns to Kirby during the show.

Their next performance is at the Jensen family reunion. It will be the first time since the band has seen Grayson since he was fired. When they encounter each other, they are cordial. Everclean performs to some applause. Then Grayson introduces the singing group that he has been managing for the past few months, Moosebutter, who performs to wild applause.

The Everclean tour ends up at Centerville High School in Provo, Utah, where the Jensen brothers went to high school. The band manager convinces Will to listen to a tape that Kirby has made of a song that he wrote and wants to perform. Will and Danny call Kirby, who listens as they leave him a message. Kirby shows up, and Will admits that the group can't get along without Kirby. The last scene is a performance of Kirby's song by Everclean, with Will and Danny singing backup.

== Cast ==
- Will Swenson as Will Jensen
- Kirby Heyborne as Kirby Laybourne
- Danny Tarasevich as Danny Jensen
- Jennifer Erekson as Jill Keith
- Peter D. Brown as Grayson Jensen
- Maureen Eastwood as Yvonne Bolschweiler

== Soundtrack ==
The soundtrack for the film contains the full-length versions of the songs that they sing in the movie. Each of the songs have tunes like popular boy-bands, from pop to rap. The lyrics are tongue-in-cheek, light-hearted jabs about the LDS culture. All of the songs are written by Will Swenson, except for the final one which was written by Kirby Heyborne, reflecting the authorship by the characters in the film. The actors who portray Everclean actually sing their songs in the movie.

1. Everclean
2. Word of Wizzum
3. Love Me, But Don't Show Me
4. Diddly Wack Mack Mormon Daddy
5. Wait For Me
6. Spiritchal as Me
7. Sweet Spirit
8. Nourish and Strengthen
9. Dang, Fetch, Oh My Heck
10. Beautiful Inside
