= The Home Teachers =

- Official film video release artwork
- Directed by: Kurt Hale
- Written by: John Moyer, Kurt Hale
- Produced by: Kurt Hale, Dave Hunter
- Starring: Michael Birkeland; Jeff Birk
- Cinematography: Ryan Little
- Edited by: Wynn Hougaard
- Music by: Dan Carlisle
- Distributed by: Halestorm Entertainment
- Release date: 2004
- Running time: 82 minutes
- Country: United States
- Language: English
- Box office: $196,123

The Home Teachers is a 2004 comedy film written by John Moyer and Kurt Hale, and directed by Kurt Hale. The Home Teachers is distributed by Halestorm Entertainment and intended for LDS audiences, or members of the Church of Jesus Christ of Latter-day Saints.

== Plot ==
Greg Blazer (Michael Birkeland) is a lackadaisical Latter-day Saint father who is determined to get him and his family home quickly after Sunday services so he can watch the football game but meets recent ward move-in and freshly assigned home teaching companion, Nelson Parker (Jeff Birk). Despite Greg's excuses, Nelson insists that they need to complete their monthly home teaching assignment that day, the last day of the month. Greg reluctantly agrees with the expectation of quick visits and a fast return home, but what ensues is a journey of chaos.

== Background ==
After the successful distribution of two films intended for LDS audiences, Halestorm Entertainment made the decision to produce and distribute The Home Teachers, based on a script by John Moyer. The genesis of the film grew from a single idea Moyer had of Birkeland falling through a ceiling, and he built a script around it. That scene developed into a wedding dress clad Birkeland falling through the ceiling onto a fully-set kitchen table, followed by a toilet. Moyer then wrote many other scenes involving similar slapstick humor and developed them into a story.

== Reception ==
The Home Teachers was a critical and box office disappointment. Critics lambasted its use of slapstick humor and criticized what they perceived as a heavy-handed plot. The film also suffered from direct comparisons to Tommy Boy, a successful 1995 film starring Chris Farley, and David Spade, and Planes, Trains & Automobiles, a 1987 film directed by John Hughes. Many critics felt that The Home Teachers borrowed too much from these films, a concern one professional critic referred to as "verging on comedic plagiarism".

The Home Teachers was the third film produced and distributed by Halestorm Entertainment. Halestorm's first two films, The Singles Ward and The R.M., grossed $1,250,798 and $1,111,615 at the box office, respectively. Such similar box office grosses indicated a trend for Halestorm releases. However, The Home Teachers, despite being produced and distributed by the same source, grossed $196,123 during its theatrical run. It was less than 16% the gross of The Singles Ward and the lowest grossing LDS comedy of its time.
