= The R.M. =

- Directed by: Kurt Hale
- Written by: Kurt Hale; John E. Moyer
- Produced by: Dave Hunter
- Starring: Kirby Heyborne; Daryn Tufts; Will Swenson; Britani Bateman; Tracy Ann Evans; Merrill Dodge; Michael Birkeland; Maren Ord; Gary Crowton
- Cinematography: Ryan Little
- Music by: Cody Hale
- Distributed by: Halestorm Entertainment
- Release date: January 31, 2003
- Running time: 101 min.
- Language: English
- Budget: $500,000
- Box office: $1.1 million

The R.M. is a 2003 comedy film about the experiences of a returned missionary of the Church of Jesus Christ of Latter-day Saints (LDS Church). "RM" is an LDS initialism for "returned missionary". It was written by Kurt Hale and John E. Moyer and directed by Hale.

== Plot ==
Jared Phelps returns home from his mission in Wyoming to find a world very different from the one he left only two years previously.

This movie opens with a send-off at the airport full of family and friends of Elder Phelps. He serves a two-year mission in the Wyoming Evanston South Mission. The opening credits are shown by using instant photographs. They also show Elder Phelps going from a "greenie" (new missionary), to district leader, to zone leader and finally to an assistant to the mission president.

Things do not go so well when he returns home. His parents thought that he was coming home the following month, so no one is there to meet him at the airport. He did not receive the letter that his family had moved, so he is surprised by the greeting of the new homeowner in the form of a karate kick while he is in the shower. (He later refers to this as being "Kung-fued by a naked ninja".) His bed is now occupied by a foreign exchange student from Tonga. When he is reunited with his parents, he discovers his mother is pregnant. Jared's girlfriend, who promised to wait for him to return, is getting married in two weeks. The jewelry store where he bought the ring will not take it back. And his former employer who promised to give him a job on his return has sold the business and started an Internet enterprise, and the only job opening is to mine diamonds in South Africa.

Things become worse from there. He is rejected by Brigham Young University (BYU). He quickly goes through a series of jobs and even considers selling knives. He develops a romantic relationship with Kelly, the daughter of H. Ronald Powers, a general authority with whom, to his embarrassment, he is unfamiliar (despite the fact that he gave a "great talk" last October in general conference, to which everyone seems to refer). While Jared is on a date with Kelly, his mother goes into labor and delivers a son. He also develops boils, and he is eventually arrested because of a friend's actions. Because of the arrest, he is fired from his job and released from his church calling as elders quorum president. He must seriously consider whether to lie and keep himself and his friend out of jail, or to tell the truth and send himself and/or his friend to jail. In the end, he decides to tell the truth, and is ultimately cleared of all charges, but his friend must face some jail time.

Later, Jared gives a talk at church about how his mission blessed his life in ways he did not expect. He decides to take night classes and reapply to BYU in the fall. After some time dating Kelly, the two are seen in a jewelry shop to exchange Jared's old ring for a new one, as they are now engaged.

== Selected credits ==
=== Cast ===
- Kirby Heyborne, Jared Phelps
- Britani Bateman, Kelly Powers
- Will Swenson, Kori Swenson
- Gary Crowton, Bishop Andrews
- Fred Derbyshire, Crazy Grandpa
- Wally Joyner, Brother Jensen
- Larry H. Miller, himself (cameo)

=== Crew ===
- Kurt Hale, director
- Kurt Hale & John E. Moyer, writing

== Reception ==
On Rotten Tomatoes, the film has an approval rating of 64% based on 11 reviews. The Salt Lake City based newspaper Deseret News gave a negative review of the film saying it tried to do too much with some awful local celebrity cameos. Variety gave a more positive review describing it as "Good natured and innocuously wholesome". Movieguide gave it a negative review from a religious perspective, giving the film a -4, the lowest score, on its acceptability rating indicating gross immorality or worldview problems. The film grossed a total of $1.1 million and made $130,352 on its opening weekend.

== See also ==
- The Singles Ward — 2002
- The Best Two Years — 2003
- The Home Teachers — 2004
