= The Singles Ward (film series) =

LDS comedy film series

- Official film series logo
- Based on: Characters created by John E. Moyer
- Starring: Will Swenson; Kirby Heyborne; Connie Young; Erin Chambers; Various actors
- Distributed by: Halestorm Entertainment
- Country: United States
- Language: English
- Budget: $500,000 (1 films)
- Box office: $1,250,798 (1 films)

The Singles Ward film series consists of two low-budget Mormon comedies based on original characters, co-written by Kurt Hale and John Moyer. The overall premise centers around members of the Church of Jesus Christ of Latter-day Saints (LDS Church) who are not yet married and their religious congregations, known as wards. The story details the humorous experiences for attendees in these congregations.

== Films ==
| Film | U.S. release date | Director | Screenwriter(s) | Story by | Producer(s) |
|---|---|---|---|---|---|
| The Singles Ward | January 30, 2002 | Kurt Hale | John Moyer & Kurt Hale | John Moyer | Dave Hunter |
| The Singles 2nd Ward | December 11, 2007 | Kurt Hale | Kurt Hale & John E. Moyer | Kurt Hale & John E. Moyer | Dave Hunter, George Dayton and Bryce W. Fillmore |
| The Real Life Singles Ward | March 1, 2011 | John E. Moyer | John E. Moyer | John E. Moyer | John E. Moyer, Mario DeAngelis and Brad Olsen |

=== The Singles Ward (2002) ===
After faithfully serving a full-time mission, then getting married, Jonathan Jordan finds himself divorced and once again attending one of the church's single-adult wards. As he attends a congregation specifically for unmarried adults, where the ultimate goal is eternal marriage, he quickly becomes disenchanted with the experience and stops going to church. As he copes with his experiences, he creates a standup routine lampooning the nature and lifestyle of being a member. His resistance to the church continues, until he falls for Cammie Giles, who is an active member at a local singles ward. Suddenly, Jordan finds church attendance more appealing, but he begins to question whether he is going for the right reasons or if it is just to impress his new girlfriend.

=== The Singles 2nd Ward (2007) ===
Dalen Martin, a young professor at Brigham Young University, becomes engaged to his girlfriend Christine, who is a student attending the university and a recent convert to the LDS Church. As the couple prepares for their upcoming wedding, Christine's divorced parents arrive with their new partners for the occasion. The couple explores their relationship and preparations while attending the church's congregation of single adults. Dalen tries to create a lasting relationship with Christine's separated parents, who are critical of the religion, and assists his friend Jonathan with developing a feature film based on his experiences in a Latter-day Saint singles ward. Together, Dalen and Christine build on their love and look forward to being married in a Latter-day Saint temple, although they must explain to her parents why they cannot attend their own daughter's marriage ceremony.

=== The Real Life Singles Ward (2011) ===
Filmed in a documentary style, the movie follows the real-world experiences of a few Latter-day Saints attending their singles-ward activities. Over the course of the production, the project examines the positives and negatives of dating, while exploring the young men's journey in trying to find their eternal companion. This occurs through various aspects of the process including engagement for someone who is divorced versus one who has never married. Each of the young men answer questions regarding their faith and their desires to grow closer to God in their pursuits at church.

== Main cast and characters ==
List indicators

This section includes characters who will appear or have appeared in more than two films in the series.

- An empty grey cell indicates the character was not in the film, or that the character's official presence has not yet been confirmed.
- ^{C} indicates a cameo role.
- ^{P} indicates an appearance in onscreen photographs.

| Character | Title | | |
| Character | The Singles Ward | The Singles 2nd Ward | The Real Life Singles Ward |
Principal cast
| Jonathan Jordan | Will Swenson | Will Swenson | |
| Cammie Giles-Jordan | Connie Young | Connie Young | |
| Dalen Martin | Kirby Heyborne | Kirby Heyborne | |
| Christine McClintock-Martin | | Erin Chambers | |
| Eldon Coates | Daryn Tufts | Daryn Tufts | |
| Hyrum | Michael Birkeland | Michael Birkeland | |
| DeVerl | Lincoln Hoppe | Lincoln Hoppe | |
| Zak Aldridge | Robert Swenson | Robert Swenson | |
| Jenny | | Lisa Higbee | |
| Willard | | Brad Johnson | |
| Laura | | Katherine Purdie | |
| Kate | | Kelly Hennessey | |
| Scott "Skippy" Jessop | | | himself |
| Nathan Smith Jones | | | himself |
| Micah Lisonbee | | | himself |
Supporting cast
| Mrs. Martin | Michelle Gould | Liz Winter | |
| Mr. Giles | Ron McBride | | |
| Brother Angel | Wally Joyner^{C} | Wally Joyner^{C} | |
| Emotional Ward Member | Jeremy Hoop^{C} | | |
| Sunbeam Teacher | Danny Ainge^{C} | | |
| Auto Mechanic | Shawn Bradley^{C} | | |
| Brother Niner | Steve Young^{C} | | |
| Miniature Golfer | LaVell Edwards^{C} | | |
| Julie Stoffer | herself^{P}^{C} | | |
| Thurl Bailey | himself^{C} | | |
| Gordon Jump | himself^{C} | | |
| Wes the Neighbor | Richard Dutcher^{C} | | |
| Mitch English | himself^{C} | | |

== Additional crew and production details ==
| Film | Crew/Detail | | | | | |
| Film | Composer | Cinematographer(s) | Editor(s) | Production companies | Distributing company | Running time |
|---|---|---|---|---|---|---|
| The Singles Ward | Cody Hale | Ryan Little | Wynn Hougaard | Halestorm Entertainment | Halestorm Distribution | 1 hr 42 mins |
| The Singles 2nd Ward | Cody Hale | Brandon Christensen | John Lyde | Halestorm Entertainment | Halestorm Distribution | 1 hr 27 mins |
| The Real Life Singles Ward | —N/a | Mario DeAngelis, Brad Olsen & Kyle Raney | Mario DeAngelis, Brad Olsen & Zachary B. Marsh | Halestorm Entertainment, 4Ever Films | Halestorm Distribution | 1 hr |

== Reception ==
In the book Religious Humor in Evangelical Christian and Mormon Culture, Elisha McIntyre highlighted the proposal scene between Dalen and Christine, stating that it was "a delicate balance of the serious and humorous mode."

=== Box office and financial performance ===
| Film | Box office gross | | | Box office ranking | | Video sales gross | Worldwide total gross income | Budget | Worldwide total net income | Ref. |
| Film | North America | Other territories | World-wide | All time worldwide | North America | Video sales gross | Worldwide total gross income | Budget | Worldwide total net income | Ref. |
|---|---|---|---|---|---|---|---|---|---|---|
| The Singles Ward | $1,250,798 | —N/a | $1,250,798 | #8,369 | #13,967 | Figures not publicly available | >$1,250,798 | $500,000 | >$750,798 | |
| The Singles 2nd Ward | —N/a | —N/a | —N/a | —N/a | —N/a | Figures not publicly available | >$0 | Figures not publicly available | >$0 | —N/a |
| The Real Life Singles Ward | —N/a | —N/a | —N/a | —N/a | —N/a | Figures not publicly available | >$0 | Figures not publicly available | >$0 | —N/a |
| Totals | $1,250,798 | $0 | $1,250,798 | x̅ 2,790 | x̅ 4,656 | >$0 | >$1,250,798 | >$500,000 | ≤$750,798 | |

=== Critical response ===
| Film | Rotten Tomatoes |
|---|---|
| The Singles Ward | 50% (8 reviews) |
| The Singles 2nd Ward | |
| The Real Life Singles Ward | —N/a |

== In other media ==
=== The Singles Ward soundtrack ===
The soundtrack is a collection of Latter-day Saint artists performing songs from the LDS Church's hymnbook and its Children's Songbook. The soundtrack album was released by Guapo Records.

- "The Church of Jesus Christ" – Magstatic
- "Come, Come Ye Saints" – Slender
- "There is Sunshine in My Soul Today" – Ponchillo
- "Do What is Right" – Mismash
- "Popcorn Popping" – Rooster
- "Book of Mormon Stories" – Pipe Dream
- "In Our Lovely Deseret" – Mr. Fusion
- "Keep the Commandments" – Mighty Mahogany
- "I Feel My Savior's Love" – Mismash
- "We Are All Enlisted" – Magstatic
- "Battle Hymn of the Republic" —Slender
- "Let Us All Press On" – Mr. Fusion
- "When Grandpa Comes" – Slender
- "God Be With You Till We Meet Again" – Jamen Brooks
