= The Cokeville Miracle =

- Theatrical film poster
- Directed by: T. C. Christensen
- Written by: T. C. Christensen
- Based on: Cokeville Elementary School hostage crisis
- Produced by: T. C. Christensen; Ron Tanner
- Starring: Jasen Wade; Nathan Stevens; Kimball Stinger; Sarah Kent; Shawn Stevens
- Cinematography: T. C. Christensen
- Edited by: Tanner Christensen
- Music by: Christian Davis; Rob Gardner
- Production company: Remember Films
- Distributed by: Excel Entertainment Group
- Release date: 5 June 2015
- Running time: 94 minutes
- Country: United States
- Language: English
- Box office: $1,348,456

The Cokeville Miracle is a 2015 drama film written & directed by T. C. Christensen and starring Jasen Wade, Sarah Kent and Kimball Stinger. The film was based on the 1986 Cokeville Elementary School hostage crisis and the book The Cokeville Miracle: When Angels Intervene by Hartt Wixom and Judene Wixom. The faith-based film was released in select theaters across the United States in the summer of 2015, and was distributed by Deseret Book Company and affiliated retailers.

== Plot ==
In May 1986, David Young from Tucson, Arizona (and former town marshal of Cokeville), his daughter from his first marriage (Penny), and his second wife (Doris), journey to Cokeville, to take the school hostage and blow it up. Part of the terrorist group (including Penny) bails at the last minute. At the school, Young and Doris gather 136 students and 18 teachers inside Room 4, and Young explains he has a bomb wired to a dead man's switch tied to his wrist. He orders the school principal to call the authorities and deliver his ransom demand: $2,000,000 for each child.

Cop Ron Hartley, begins to question his religious beliefs, wondering whether a just God would really allow the atrocities he witnesses in his work to happen. On that day, Ron learns about the situation at the school and rushes to Cokeville. Inside the school, gas begins to leak from the bomb, making the children sick from the fumes. The teachers convince Young to let them open the doors and windows for ventilation. When Young goes to the bathroom, he transfers the dead man's switch to Doris, who accidentally pulls the switch and triggers the bomb. The room is set on fire and fills with smoke and shrapnel as shells from Young's guns explode in the heat. The teachers quickly evacuate the children through the open doors and windows. Young returns from the bathroom, shoots Doris, shoots teacher John Miller, and finally shoots himself.

A few days after the event, a child (Jason) has post-traumatic symptoms. He consults a psychologist and reveals that he saw angels when the bomb exploded. Other children admitted they saw them too. Ron investigates and is led to believe that angels indeed protected the children that day. Ron's faith is still challenged after the findings of his investigation, but the bishop's sermon finally convinces him that angels divinely interferred. Out of the 154 adults and children, none of them died in a confined room explosion. The only two fatalities were the bomber and his wife.

While Cokeville was predominantly Mormon, the director chose to make the religious faith in the movie nondenominational.

== Cast ==
- Jasen Wade as Ron Hartley, the film's protagonist, one of the town's deputies who is questioning his faith as his children are taken hostage.
- Sarah Kent as Claudia Hartley, Ron's wife, who is worried about his skepticism.
- Kimball Stinger as Jason Hartley, Ron and Claudia's son, who tells them about seeing an angel of a deceased ancestor.
- Alexa Rae as Cindy Hartley, Ron and Claudia's daughter.
- Nathan Stevens as David Young, the film's antagonist, the ex-town marshal who holds Cokeville Elementary hostage.
- Kymberly Mellen as Doris Young, David's second wife, who accompanies him on his devious plan, but treats the children with much kindness.
- Caitlin EJ Meyer as Penny Young, David's second daughter from his previous marriage, who refuses to participate in his evil plan.
- Paul Hunt and Channon Voyce as Doyle Mendenhall and Gerald Deppe, two of David Young's friends who also refuse to participate in holding helpless, little children hostage. According to IMDb Paul Hunt played Cunningham and Channon Voyce played Parker, two of the children held hostage.
- Alan Peterson as Max Excell, the Principal of Cokeville Elementary.
- Jillette Dayton as Christina "Tina" Cook, the Secretary of Cokeville Elementary.
- Barta Heiner as Verlene Bennion, an elderly teacher at Cokeville Elementary who suffers from smoke inhalation after the bomb goes off.
- Liz Christensen as Pat Bennion, Verlene's daughter-in-law and one of the teachers at Cokeville Elementary.
- Joshua Cooper as John Miller, a music teacher who is shot by David Young after the bomb goes off.
- Rick Macy as Rich Haskell, a certified bomb expert from the Sweetwater County Sheriff's department in Rock Springs.
- Shawn Stevens as John Teichert, the bishop of Cokeville's local congregation.

A child on the set was the son of an actual survivor of the 1986 attack, Kam Wixom.

== Production ==
The film was written and directed by T. C. Christensen, (The Work and the Glory, Only a Stonecutter, 17 Miracles, Ephraim's Rescue) and produced by Ron Tanner and Christensen. The film debuted on June 5, 2015, in select theaters in Utah, and then across the United States. The film was subsequently released on DVD and Blu-ray for distribution by Excel Entertainment Group through Deseret Book and affiliated retailers.
