= Willard Bean =

American boxer

Personal information
- Nicknames: Fighting Parson, Mormon Cyclone
- Born: Willard Washington Bean; May 16, 1868 Provo, Utah, United States
- Died: September 25, 1949 (aged 81) Salt Lake City, Utah
- Height: 5 ft 9 in (175 cm)

Boxing career
- Weight class: Middleweight
- Stance: Orthodox

Boxing record
- Total fights: 18
- Wins: 8
- Win by KO: 5
- Losses: 7
- Draws: 3
- No contests: 2

Willard Washington Bean (May 16, 1868 – September 25, 1949) was an American middleweight boxer and a missionary of the Church of Jesus Christ of Latter-day Saints (LDS Church). In 1905, Bean claimed the title of middleweight champion of the world. He was also instrumental in the acquisition of a number of significant properties for the LDS Church, including the Hill Cumorah.

== Biography ==
Willard Washington Bean was born on May 16, 1868, the seventh of ten children, to George Washington Bean and Elizabeth née Baum.

In 1875, when he was about seven years old, his family moved to Sevier County, Utah. They lived on the west side of the Sevier River, about three miles east of the village of Richfield. From 1894 to 1895 he studied at Brigham Young Academy (now Brigham Young University). He then went on to be a Physical Education Instructor at the University of Utah for two years. He also served as a member of both the Salt Lake City and Richfield police departments, and edited the Richfield Reaper.

Bean married Gussie Dee née Felts in the Manti Utah Temple on May 3, 1899, and they had two children. She died on March 27, 1909. On September 18, 1914, he married Rebecca Rosetta Peterson, with whom he had another four children.

== Boxing record ==
He had his boxing debut on September 4, 1897, losing on a points decision. His career lasted for 18 fights, with a record of eight wins, three draws, and seven losses. However these are only the recorded fights, it is likely that Bean fought in additional contests that haven't been acknowledged.

In 1905, Bean claimed the title of middleweight champion of the world. Although it was not until 1910 with the formation of the International Boxing Union that world title fights were created, until that time champions were generally recognized by public acclamation. The World Middleweight boxing champion at the time was Tommy Ryan.

== Missionary work ==
In 1907, the LDS Church purchased the farmhouse and surrounding land in Palmyra, New York, that was originally owned by Joseph Smith Sr. In 1915, Bean was sent as a missionary to live at the farm, the first members of the church to live in Palmyra in eighty-four years. He was instrumental in acquiring additional properties of historical significance to the church, including the Hill Cumorah. Through his and his family's work three branches of the church were subsequently established in the area. They were released from their mission in 1939, and returned to Salt Lake City, where Bean died on September 25, 1949.

== In the media and popular culture ==
The Fighting Preacher is a 2019 drama film depicting the 24-year missionary service of Willard and Rebecca Bean in Palmyra, New York. The film was written and directed by T. C. Christensen.
