= Tayva Patch =

American actress (1953–2015)

- Born: Tayva Rhoton; February 18, 1953; Winslow, Arizona, U.S.
- Died: November 21, 2015 (aged 62); Provo, Utah, U.S.
- Occupation: Actress
- Years active: 1995–2010

Tayva Patch (née Rhoton; February 18, 1953 – November 21, 2015) was an American actress who played the role of Lucy Mack Smith in many films. She also played the role of the FBI agent Meredith in the film Brigham City (2001).

Tayva Rhoton was born in Winslow, Arizona. She studied acting at Brigham Young University. She married Brian Patch in 1972. The couple had four children and remained married until Tayva's death. She was a member of the Church of Jesus Christ of Latter-day Saints. Other roles played by Tayva Patch include Mary Magdalene in The Testaments (2000). Patch played several roles alongside Rick Macy, both in several films where he has played Joseph Smith Sr. and also in Out of Step (2002).

In the early years of Mormon cinema (through June 2002), Patch was the only actress who had been cast in a top-billed role in more than one film in the genre.

== See also ==
- LDS cinema, article on Latter-day Saint cinema, also known as Mollywood
