= Evelyn Wood =

Evelyn Wood may refer to:

- Evelyn Wood (British Army officer) (1838–1919), Field marshal, Victoria Cross recipient
- Evelyn Wood (teacher) (1909–1995), American educator
