= Wixom (surname) =

Wixom is a surname originating in England. It is a relatively rare last name, with only 1,371 people in the United States possessing the last name. The surname is thought to originate from the town of Wickham, Hampshire in England. Notable people with the name include:

- Emma Nevada (née Wixom), American operatic soprano
- Hartt Wixom, American author and wildlife conservationist
- Rosemary M. Wixom, former general president of the Primary of The Church of Jesus Christ of Latter-day Saints
- Willard Clark Wixom, founder of Wixom, Michigan
