= Levi Savage Jr. =

LDS Church missionary

Levi Savage Jr. (March 23, 1820 – December 13, 1910) is a prominent figure in the history of The Church of Jesus Christ of Latter-day Saints (LDS Church). He was one of the LDS Church's earliest missionaries to Asia and was one of the leaders of the Mormon pioneers traveling in the Willie Handcart Company.

== Early life ==
Savage was the second of 15 children born in Greenfield, Huron County, Ohio to Levi Savage Sr. and Polly Haynes. He grew up on a farm in southern Michigan, where he had some schooling. During his lifetime, Savage was a teamster, soldier, teacher, pioneer, and missionary to India and Burma. He spent the remaining years of his life as a farmer in southern Utah. Savage kept a detailed journal from October 6, 1852 to March 16, 1903, making him an important primary source when it comes to late 19th century American history.

== Pioneer ==
In the early 1840s, Savage's parents joined the LDS Church. The family moved from Michigan to Nauvoo, Illinois, and later migrated as Mormon pioneers to the Salt Lake Valley in 1847.

During the move from Nauvoo to Salt Lake City, Savage enlisted in the U.S. Army as a part of the Mormon Battalion. His enlistment began in July 1846 in Company D of the battalion. The battalion marched 1,400 miles from Council Bluffs, Iowa, to San Diego, California.

Savage's family was a part of the June 18, 1847, Abraham O. Smoot/George B. Wallace wagon train company. His mother, Polly, died on the trek to Utah. Savage learned of his mother's death after he finished his enlistment with the Mormon Battalion. Savage arrived in Salt Lake City via San Diego on October 16, 1847, three weeks after the family.

Savage married Jane Mathers on January 23, 1848. Jane had crossed the plains as the cook for Savage's parents. Their only child, Levi Mathers Savage, was born on January 11, 1851. Jane died on December 29, 1852, leaving Levi Jr. to raise their infant.

== Missionary ==
In October 1852, Savage joined as an LDS Church missionary to Siam. He left his 21-month-old son with his sister, Hannah Maria Savage Eldredge, while he served a four-year mission in the Far East. He left for Siam on October 21, 1852, by traveling through Las Vegas, Nevada, to Los Angeles, California, and then by boat to San Francisco. On January 30, 1853, Savage left San Francisco headed for Siam. On the boat, Levi was struck with smallpox, but survived the outbreak. He arrived in Calcutta, India, on April 25, 1853, and then went on to Rangoon, Burma. He then went to Maulmain, Burma, situated 300 km southeast of Yangon and 70 km south of Thaton, at the mouth of Thanlwinwhere. There he attempted to preach at the British cantonment, but was prevented by the local British commander. Because Siam was experiencing a civil war, Savage never reached there. He served 2½ years in the Far East mission and started home for Utah on October 12, 1855. He traveled from Calcutta, India, to Boston, Massachusetts, by going around the Cape of Good Hope. He arrived in Boston February 28, 1856, and went on to Ohio and Michigan to visit family. In his journal Savage wrote on June 19, 1856, "I have circled the globe." The entire journey took four years.

== Willie Handcart Company ==
On July 10, 1856, shortly after arriving back in the United States, Savage journeyed to Iowa City, Iowa, where he joined the ill-fated Willie handcart company that planned to migrate to Salt Lake City. He was appointed as a sub-captain in the company. The company had initially meant to set out for Salt Lake City in early spring with a group of new LDS converts having just arrived from England. However, a lack of funding and resources meant that the converts and company had to build the hand-carts themselves, delaying the journey by months.

At a tense meeting in Florence, Nebraska on August 13, 1856, Savage was asked for his views about traveling onwards to Salt Lake City and told the group that he firmly believed that embarking West so late in the season was dangerous. When overruled Savage reportedly said, "What I have said I know to be true; but seeing you are to go forward, I will go with you, will help all I can, will work with you, will rest with you, and if necessary, will die with you. May God in his mercy bless and preserve us." William Woodward, a captain of the company, later wrote, "Levi Savage, who was censured for his truthful statement at Florence, was I think the best help we had—resolute & determined his whole soul was for the salvation of our company." Over one-fifth of the group died from freezing and starvation before they arrived in Salt Lake City on November 9, 1856.

== Second Marriage(s) ==
One member of the Willie Handcart Company was Ann Brummell Cooper, a British widow and mother of three who had come to America after the death of her husband, George Cooper. Her youngest daughter, Sara Ann, had been one of the many who died during the company's trek west. After returning to Salt Lake City with the ill-fated pioneers, Savage proceeded to visit Ann and her "two little girls" -- six year old Adelaide (b. Nov. 28, 1851) and eight year old Mary Ann (b. Nov. 22, 1849) -- a number of times throughout 1857, bringing gifts of wood or food each time. He was invited to Christmas dinner that year with Brigham Young, who mentioned on his invitation that he could bring "his lady", possibly referring to Ann as Jane had died in 1852. The following January in 1858, Young also wrote to Savage that he was awarding him permission to marry "one or two good sisters."

In October of 1857, Ann and her daughters moved in with Savage. However, the pair remained unmarried. In March of 1858, Savage reportedly suggested that Ann undergo her official LDS Endowment Ceremony, and she refused, saying she wanted to wait until she was in a "marriage covenant with the man she desired." Mary Ann and Adelaide were enrolled in school alongside Savage's eldest son Levi Mathers Savage in May of that year. The couple were formally married in the LDS fashion in October of 1858.

Despite having met Mary Ann and Adelaide so young, and referring to them multiple times throughout his diaries as Ann's "little girls," Savage proceeded to marry his step-daughters as well in 1868. At the time of these marriages, Savage was 48 and Mary Ann and Adelaide were 16 and 18 respectively. Levi Mathers Savage described the marriages as such:

“Father attended a conference at Salt Lake City October 6, 1868. He took his wife and her two daughters with him and while there he married the two girls and he returned with three wives instead of one.”

While conducting a sociological study in Salt Lake City, Kimball Young's research assistant James Hulett recorded an interview with a woman named Franklin S. Harris who told them the rumor at the time was that Savage had "married the mother on the condition that he would marry the daughters when they came of age. The mother agreed. She was very poor."

No children resulted from the marriages between Savage and Ann or Adelaide. From the marriage with Mary Ann were born three children, William, Riley, and Clara.

== Settler ==
Savage worked as a teacher on his return to Utah. Savage served with the Nauvoo Legion during the Utah War, and in 1858 he moved to Lehi, Utah, and worked as a supplier for the U.S. army at Camp Floyd.

One of Savage's last journal entries was February 1903, "This date shows that I have neglected to note daily occurrences in my journal for some time past; however, it is better late than never."

Savage died on December 13, 1910, in Toquerville, Washington County, Utah, and is buried in the cemetery in Toquerville.

== Portrayals ==
Savage is the principal character (played by actor Jasen Wade) in the T. C. Christensen film 17 Miracles. This film is based on the actual events surrounding Savage's efforts to aid the Willie Handcart Company in their journey to Salt Lake City in 1856, emphasizing the miracles he and fellow travelers reported during the trek. While Ann Brummell Cooper is played by Heather Brown, Mary Ann and Adelaide do not make an appearance in the film, likely to avoid turning off modern audiences.

== See also ==
- Elam Luddington
