= The Church of Jesus Christ of Latter-day Saints in Louisiana =

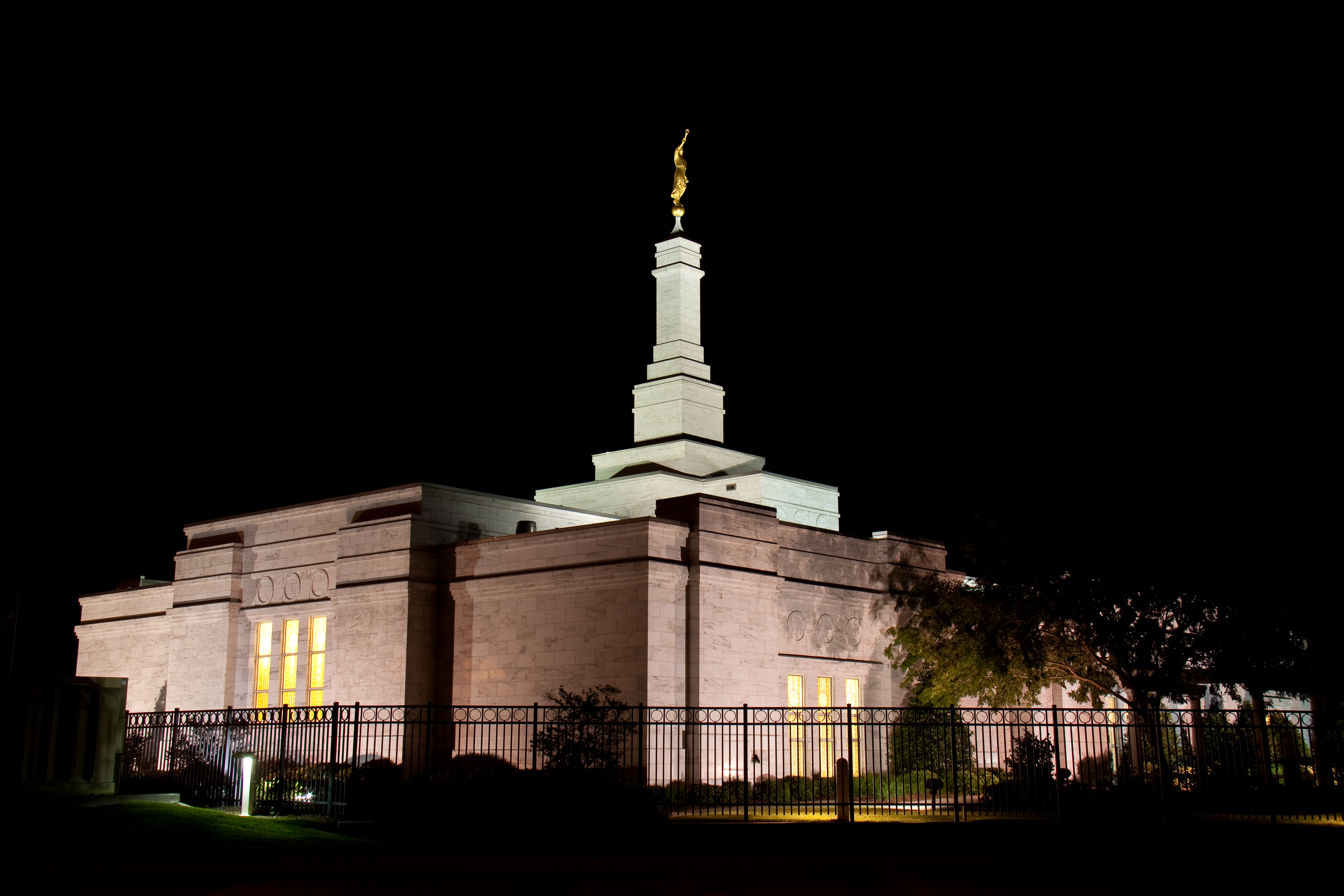
- The Baton Rouge Louisiana Temple
- Area: US Southeast
- Members: 29,913 (2025)
- Stakes: 7
- Wards: 32
- Branches: 20
- Total Congregations: 52
- Missions: 1
- Temples: 1
- FamilySearch Centers: 15

The Church of Jesus Christ of Latter-day Saints in Louisiana refers to the Church of Jesus Christ of Latter-day Saints (LDS Church) and its members in Louisiana. The first small branch was established in 1842. It has since grown to 29,913 members in 52 congregations.

Official church membership as a percentage of general population was 0.64% in 2014. According to the 2014 Pew Forum on Religion & Public Life survey, less than 1% of Louisianans self-identify themselves most closely with The Church of Jesus Christ of Latter-day Saints. The LDS Church is the sixth-largest denomination in Louisiana.

== History ==
Membership in Louisiana
Year	Members
1944*	300
1980	12,155
1990*	22,000
1999	24,143
2009	27,628
2019	29,589
2025	29,913
*Membership was published as an estimated or rounded number.

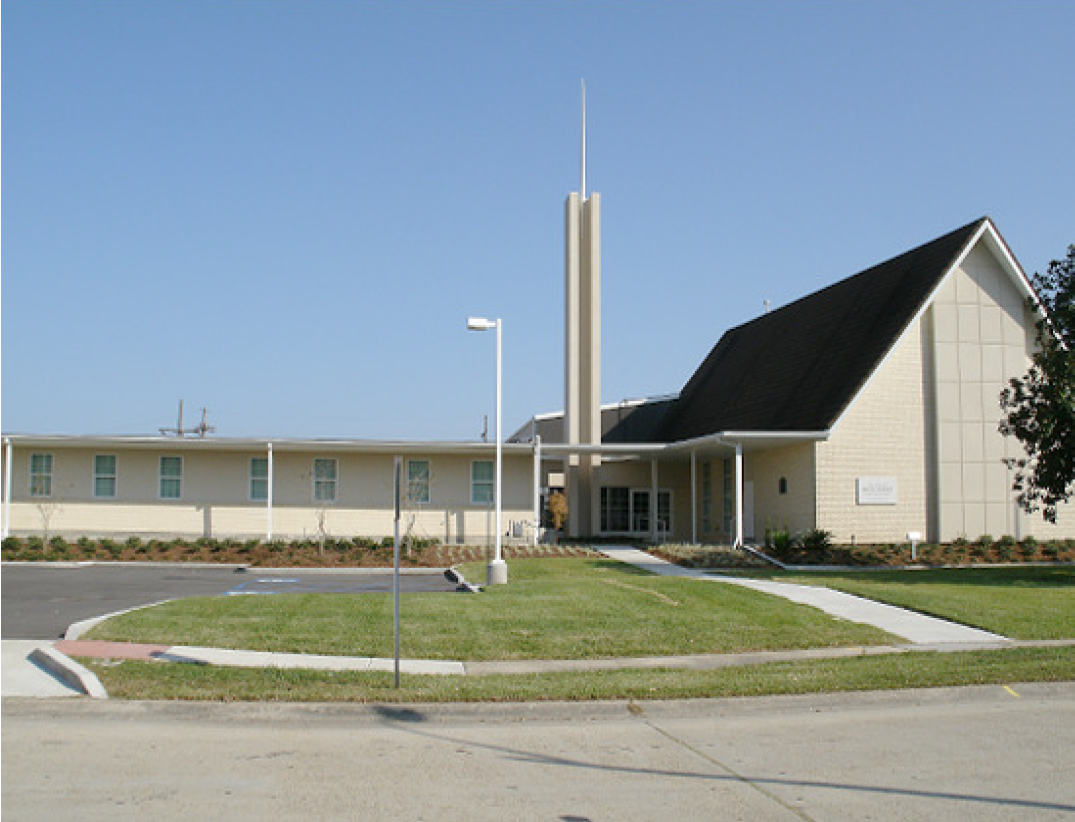
The New Orleans Stake Center and meetinghouse in Metairie, Louisiana.

On January 4, 1841, Joseph Smith received a letter from Elam Ludington and Eli G. Terrill of New Orleans, who requested an elder to assist the members of the church who were living there. "Send us Peter, or an Apostle to preach unto Jesus," they wrote, and enclosed $10 to help defray expenses. The group may have been among those from the sailing ship Isaac Newton, which arrived from London on December 21, 1840.

Harrison Sagers arrived at New Orleans on March 28, 1841. He preached to large crowds but was troubled by mobs. At one point, he was protected from a mob by a group of courageous women who circled him in his defense. He baptized several people. Additional missionaries were sent from Nauvoo to assist Sagers in his duties.

By November 1841, New Orleans became the principal port of arrival for Latter-day Saints from Europe. Over the next few years, 17,463 individuals immigrated by way of this port city. From 1844 to 1855, due to outbreaks of major epidemics, New York became the port of arrival for the church immigrants, and the New Orleans and Lafayette branch functioned in New Orleans.

No other known missionary efforts took place in Louisiana until February 16, 1896, when missionaries were assigned to the Louisiana Conference, part of the Southern States Mission. Joseph A. Cornwall arrived in Louisiana on September 10 of the same year. By the end of 1897, he and his companions had baptized their first converts. On March 12, 1899, the Red Rock Branch was formed. John R. Jones, a sawmill owner, befriended the missionaries and protected them from opposition. Alexander Colman Wagley was baptized on September 4, 1898, and he became the first president of the Red Rock Branch. David A. Broadbent, president of the Louisiana District from 1898 to 1899, reported 110 people had been baptized by June 16, 1899.

In October 1899, a mob threatened a missionary under the medical care of Jane Holt Clark, a midwife. She confronted the mob with a shotgun and said, "I brought a good many of you into the world, and I can take you out again just as easily." The mob dispersed.

A wagon train of members from Pride traveled to and settled at Corleyville in Sabine Parish. They organized a branch on November 12, 1916 and erected meetinghouse around 1920. By June 1935, the Many Branch had been organized, and its meeting house was built by December 6, 1941.

Howard and Marion Bennion arrived in New Orleans in the 1920s and organized a branch in their apartment in 1924. The branch struggled in the early 1930s, but due to an increased effort from the local members, the New Orleans branch began to grow. One hundred people celebrated the New Orleans Branch centennial in 1944. Due to the influx of Latter-day Saint servicemen who came during World War II, the branch had grown to 300 members by 1948. A meetinghouse was established in January 1951 and then dedicated on November 16, 1952. That same year, meetinghouses were dedicated in Hammond, Williamson, and Lake Charles. The New Orleans Stake, Louisiana's first, was organized on June 19, 1955, by Harold B. Lee and Mark E. Petersen of the Quorum of the Twelve.

On May 15, 1977, church president Spencer W. Kimball visited Baton Rouge and spoke to a congregation of 12,000. On March 2, 2003, Gordon B. Hinckley spoke to 5,000 members in the University of New Orleans Lakefront Arena as part of a two-day tour of members in the Southern states.

== Stakes ==
Stakes with congregations in Louisiana
Red = Temple and Stake Center
Green = Stake Center

As of July 2026, the following stakes had congregations in Louisiana

Stake	Organized	Mission	Temple District
Alexandria	27 Aug 1978	Louisiana Baton Rouge	Baton Rouge Louisiana
Baton Rouge	26 Jan 1969	Louisiana Baton Rouge	Baton Rouge Louisiana
Denham Springs	19 Apr 1981	Louisiana Baton Rouge	Baton Rouge Louisiana
Monroe	18 Aug 1985	Mississippi Jackson	Baton Rouge Louisiana
New Orleans	19 Jun 1955	Louisiana Baton Rouge	Baton Rouge Louisiana
Orange Texas (Note: Stake located outside Louisiana with congregation(s) meeting in Louisiana)	29 Aug 1982	Texas Houston East	Houston Texas
Shreveport	26 Jan 1958	Mississippi Jackson	Dallas Texas
Slidell (Note: The Slidell Stake was dissolved on 3 June 2007 in the aftermath of Hurricane Katrina; it was reinstated on 15 October 2017)	17 Nov 1985	Louisiana Baton Rouge	Baton Rouge Louisiana

== Missions ==
Since World War II, Louisiana has been included in the Texas-Louisiana, Gulf States, and the Louisiana Shreveport missions. The Louisiana Baton Rouge Mission was organized in 1975.

== Temples ==
On July 16, 2000, the Baton Rouge Louisiana Temple was dedicated by President Gordon B. Hinckley.

94. Baton Rouge Louisiana Temple; Official website; News & images	
Location: Announced: Groundbreaking: Dedicated: Rededicated: Size: Style:	Baton Rouge, Louisiana, United States; October 14, 1998 by Gordon B. Hinckley; May 8, 1999 by Monte J. Brough; July 16, 2000 by Gordon B. Hinckley; November 17, 2019 by Quentin L. Cook; 10,890 sq ft (1,012 m^{2}) on a 6.3-acre (2.5 ha) site Classic modern, single-spire design - designed by Paul Tessier & Associates and Church A&E Services.

== See also ==
- The Church of Jesus Christ of Latter-day Saints membership statistics (United States)
