= Hartt Wixom =

American author (1933–2017)

Hartt Partridge Wixom
- Born: 1933; Salt Lake City, Utah, U.S.
- Died: 2017 (aged 83–84); St. George, Utah, U.S.
- Occupation: Writer
- Years active: 1961–2017
- Notable work: Jacob Hamblin; The Cokeville Miracle: When Angels Intervene; Elk and Elk Hunting; Hunting and Fishing Guide to Utah; Improve the World, Go Fishing
- Spouse: G. Judene Dalebout (m. 1958)
- Children: 7

Hartt Partridge Wixom (1933 – 2017) was an American writer who specialized in the topics of hunting, fishing, wildlife and environmental protection, and Latter-Day Saints (LDS) history. His most recent works focus on early LDS history: Jacob Hamblin (2008), Profiles in Mormon Courage (2007), and Critiquing the Critics of Joseph Smith (2005). Another book on early LDS history, Edward Partridge (1998), is a biography of Wixom's great-great-grandfather, the first presiding bishop of the LDS church. In 1998 Wixom gave the annual Juanita Brooks Lecture at Dixie State College in St. George, Utah on the subject of Jacob Hamblin. In 2009 Wixom was the featured speaker at the annual Jacob Hamblin Days celebration in Kanab, Utah.

Hunting and fishing books by Wixom include Fishing: The Extra Edge (2006), Personalized Fishing Guide to Utah (2001), Improve the World, Go Fishing (1999), Fishing and Hunting Guide to Utah (1990), Elk and Elk Hunting (1986), and Penny Pinching Guide to Bigger Fish and Better Hunting (1980). Wixom helped organize the first chapter of Trout Unlimited in 1965, serving as its first president.

Wixom co-authored the book When Angels Intervene to Save the Children (originally entitled Trial by Terror and first published in 1987; revised and updated 1994) with his wife, Judene Wixom, on the Cokeville Elementary School hostage crisis of 1986 in which their 12-year-old son Kamron was taken hostage; CBS made the television movie To Save the Children in 1994, based on that book. In 2015 the book was retitled The Cokeville Miracle: When Angels Intervene and made into the feature film The Cokeville Miracle by filmmaker T.C. Christensen. Wixom also published a work of fiction in 1998, Benjamin Lowery and authored the written portion of the graphic arts book Utah, published in 1974.

Wixom graduated in 1951 from South High School (Salt Lake City), received bachelor's and master's degrees in communications from Brigham Young University (BYU) in Provo, Utah, and completed some post graduate work in history at the University of Utah. Starting his career in journalism prior to 1960, Wixom served as editor-in-chief of BYU's The Daily Universe. By 1961, The Deseret News, a daily newspaper in Salt Lake City, Utah, had hired Wixom as an outdoor sports writer. In 1970, Field & Stream magazine named Wixom their Rocky Mountain field editor, a position he held for 5 years. Wixom was the founding editor of his own Utah Outdoors magazine and served as Wyoming editor for Western Outdoors magazine from 1981 to 1986 after moving to that state in 1981. He was also a frequent contributor to the monthly periodicals Outdoor Life and Sports Afield and served as chairman of the Fish Committee, Utah Wildlife Federation.

During the 1960s and 70s, Wixom's interests in hunting and fishing brought him into contact with wildlife conservationists and environmentalists working to preserve or restore clean air and water in the American West. As he became increasingly outspoken in favor of federal regulations for clean air and water, The Deseret News named him their environmental editor, the first of its kind in the Mountain States. Wixom collaborated with actor Robert Redford in 1972 to preserve the free flow of the Provo River through central Utah.
