= Warner P. Woodworth =

American academic

Warner P. Woodworth is a global social entrepreneur and professor emeritus in the Department of Management in the Marriott School of Business at Brigham Young University (BYU). He is a leading advocate of development of microcredit and has been involved in researching as well as developing such programs.

Woodworth graduated from South High School in 1960. Woodworth holds BS and MS degrees from BYU and an MA and PhD from the University of Michigan. He has also held various visiting scholar appointments including as the first Peter Drucker Centennial Scholar at the Drucker School of Management of Claremont Graduate University, University of Rio de Janeiro, Brazil, and the Business School, University of Michigan.

Among other positions, Woodworth has served as co-editor of the Journal of Microfinance.

Among the organizations Woodworth has helped to found have been Mentors International, Unitus Microcredit and HELP International. HELP International was an outgrowth of HELP Honduras, which was an organization formed to provide aid in Honduras in the wake of Hurricane Mitch.

He is also the founder and current chairman of MicroBusiness Mentors that seeks to empower Latino immigrants to the USA.

Among the books Woodworth has co-authored are Small Really is Beautiful (1997), United For Zion: Principles for Uniting the Saints to Eliminate Poverty and Working Toward Zion co-authored with James W. Lucas (1999).

In the wake of the 2010 earthquake in Haiti, Woodworth formed a team to help rebuild the island nation that ultimately led to a new NGO called Sustain Haiti. Woodworth has mobilized thousands of American volunteers to fight global poverty and empower poor villages around the world. That includes starting 41 NGOs that now operate in 62 countries and raise about $28 million a year.

Woodworth has been a consistent and vocal critic of the growing trend of for-profit organizations entering into operations that they have claimed constitute microfinancing.

== Publications ==
- "Barefoot Engineers: Cases of Simple Tech Innovations from the Bottom-Up. (India H2O for Humanity, Guatemala Lorena Adobe Stoves [estufas], Kenya Lumber Mill, Affordable Housing, and Coconut Factory, and more). International Journal of Engineering Research and Applications (IJERA). August 29, 2020, 14 pp.
- “Developing Social Entrepreneurs and Social Innovators: A Social Identity and Self-Efficacy Approach,” Academy of Management Learning and Education (AMLE), Volume 11, Number 3, September 2012, (with Isaac Smith), pp. 390–407
- “Social Business in Times of Crisis: Microcredit Strategies During Social Unrest and/or Natural Disaster,” Journal of Social Business, Glasgow University, Vol. 3, No. 1, April 2013, pp. 70–88.
- "Where to Microfinance" with Christopher Dunford and Gary Woller.
- "Microfinance as Grass-Roots Policy for International Development" in Policy Studies Journal Vol. 29, Issue 2 (May 2001), p. 267-282.
- Managing by the Numbers: Absentee Ownership and the Decline of American Industry with Christopher Meek and W. Gibb Dyer. ISBN 0-201-16129-X
- "Third World Economic Empowerment in the New Millennium: Microenterprise, Microentrepreneurship, and Microfinance" in S.A.M. Advanced Management Journal Vol. 65 (2000) no. 4.
- Creating Labor-Management Partnerships also with Christopher Meek. Reading, Massachusetts: Addison-Wesley Publishing Company, 1995.
- Small Really Is Beautiful (1997)
- United For Zion: Principles for Uniting the Saints to Eliminate Poverty (1999)
- Working Toward Zion with James W. Lucas (1995)

== Notes ==
Woodworth's membership on boards of directors includes Ouelessebougou Alliance (West Africa), Mentors International (five countries), Grameen America, HELP International (19 countries), UNITUS (16 countries), MicroBusiness Mentors, and others.
