= 1986 Cokeville Elementary School hostage crisis =

Hostage crisis in Wyoming, US

Coordinates: 42°05′12.7″N 110°57′16.2″W

- Location of Cokeville within the state of Wyoming
- Location: Cokeville, Wyoming, US
- Date: May 16, 1986; 40 years ago c. 1:00 p.m. - 3:30 p.m. MST
- Target: Students and staff at Cokeville Elementary School
- Attack type: School bombing, school shooting, hostage situation, attempted mass murder, attempted pedicide, murder-suicide, uxoricide
- Weapons: Colt .45-caliber pistol, IEDs, nine other various firearms
- Deaths: 2 (both perpetrators)
- Injuries: 79 (78 by bomb-related injuries, 1 by gunfire)
- Perpetrators: David and Doris Young

The Cokeville Elementary School hostage crisis occurred on Friday, May 16, 1986, in Cokeville, Wyoming, United States, when former town marshal David Young, 43, and his wife Doris Young, 47, took 154 hostages – 136 children and 18 adults – at Cokeville Elementary School.

Transporting ten firearms and an improvised gasoline bomb, the couple entered the school and corralled the students and faculty into a single classroom to hold them for ransom. With the bomb trigger tied to his wrist, David threatened the group that he might detonate the device at any time.

After a two-and-a-half hour standoff, David became increasingly agitated and decided to leave the room, transferring the trigger string to his wife Doris' wrist. Eventually Doris inadvertently lifted her arm and the bomb went off prematurely. Returning to the scene, David fatally shot his wife, non-fatally shot a teacher, then committed suicide. All the hostages survived, though 79 were later hospitalized with burns and injuries, the majority of which were severe.

== Background ==
The nearest major city to Cokeville is Salt Lake City, Utah, over 140 miles away.

David Young was the only police officer in Cokeville for six months in 1979. After being fired for misconduct, he moved to Tucson, Arizona, where he married Doris Young. He had a police science degree from a college in Nebraska.

On May 18, 1986, two days after the bombing, it was reported that both David and Doris had alleged ties to white supremacist groups, including the Posse Comitatus and the Aryan Nations. However, on June 8, 1986, it was reported that Sheriff T. Dab Wolfley of the Lincoln County Sheriff's Department had doubts that the two had ties to the two white supremacist groups, and stated that writings in David and Doris Young's diaries included mentioning them having issues with federal taxing policies, and some writings and tone of language in the diaries had similarities to those of the publications made by the Aryan Nations and Posse Comitatus. There was also confusion from investigators and officials after another Tucson, Arizona man surnamed Young, who was widely believed to be a member of Posse Comitatus, was mistaken for David Young.

Prior to the hostage crisis, David had tested a similar bomb in a sealed school bus in Arizona, destroying it.

David and Doris both returned to Cokeville on May 16, 1986. At 1:00 pm, they pulled up to the Cokeville Elementary School and unloaded a gasoline bomb, along with five rifles and five handguns. Vengeance for having been fired did not seem to have been the motive, but rather a philosophy recorded in journal entries referring to a Brave New World where he wanted to reign over intelligent children. He had been aware of above-average achievement scores from Cokeville's education system. Journal entries also indicate that he saw opportunity in the close-knit community; he wrote, "Threaten one and all are at your mercy." David went to the school office, handing out a manifesto titled "ZERO EQUALS INFINITY" and announcing "This is a revolution!" Teachers were confused and baffled by Young's nonsensical, strange writing. Meanwhile, Doris went from classroom to classroom, luring 136 children, six faculty, nine teachers, and three other adults, including a job applicant and a UPS driver, into a first-grade classroom for a total of 154 hostages. She lured them by telling them there was either an emergency, a surprise, or an assembly there.

David Young had initially planned to involve cousin Gerald Deppe and hunting companion Doyle Mendenhall, who had invested money with him in a get-rich-quick scheme that he had called "The Biggie." The two men eventually refused to participate in the event. Both men were handcuffed in a van outside the school.

David's youngest daughter from his first marriage, Princess, then 19 years old, entered the elementary school with David and Doris, but refused to carry out the plan, leaving to report the incident at the town hall. A clerk at the Lazy T motel where the couple and Princess stayed in the week prior to the bombing, overheard the daughter talking to a friend on the payphone that "tomorrow's the day" and to "take the pictures down" and not "talk to anyone without a warrant."

Princess, Deppe, and Mendenhall were never charged in relation to this crime because of their refusal to participate.

=== Bomb ===
The wooden piece was tied to Doris' wrist by a string.

The jug of gasoline had a pinhole-sized leak on its bottom. This allowed gasoline to drip into the tuna fish cans, turning the aluminum-flour mixture into paste, unable to aerosolize. The leaking gasoline's fumes prompted teachers to open the classroom windows, unknowingly creating vents for the impending explosion.

Two of the three blasting caps on the bomb failed to detonate; the wires to each tuna can had been reportedly cut. The blasting cap in the gasoline jug functioned properly, initiating the explosion. The reason for the wire cuts is so far unexplained.

== Standoff ==
In the classroom, David held the gasoline bomb, with the triggering mechanism attached to a string tied around his wrist. He demanded a ransom of two million dollars per hostage ($308 million, equivalent to $905 million in 2025), and an audience with President Ronald Reagan. David had also sent a copy of the manifesto to Reagan. With permission, the teachers brought in books, art supplies and a television to help keep the children occupied.

Meanwhile, police and parents gathered out of sight of the school room where hostages were gathered. Doris tried numerous times to calm the children by telling them to "think of it as an adventure movie," or that they "would have a great story to tell their grandchildren." Many children showed signs of distress with sobs, complaining of headaches from the smell of gasoline from the bomb, or simply wanting to go home.

One hostage had a birthday on that day and songs were sung in his honor. The hostage takers took part in the singing. The mood did not lift with the singing and teachers quickly negotiated with the hostage takers to get items from the library to help the kids get their minds off the siege, and help to pass the time. Windows were opened to rid the room of gasoline fumes, and prayers were offered in small groups among the children.

Throughout the standoff, David grew increasingly agitated and irritable. With fear that David might become unhinged, the teachers decided to make an ~8-foot square of masking tape for his own personal space.

"We could tell that he was becoming very nervous. As I sat there and watched him, I could feel he was becoming agitated. He had just big rings of perspiration. I was frightened and felt that we needed to do something to try to calm down or to be careful, because he was so agitated. So we decided to take some masking tape, and we taped—I think it was an eight-foot square in the middle of the room, right here, and he pushed the cart, the homemade bomb into this, and we told the children this was the magic square. Don't go past this square. Some of the children just sat right all around and just watched him. And I'm sure that that made him very nervous."

— Carol Peterson, Second grade teacher on the 1986 bombing of Cokeville Elementary School, WyoHistory.org

== Bombing and death of the perpetrators ==
About 2½ hours into the standoff, David transferred the triggering mechanism of the bomb to Doris' wrist, and went to a small bathroom that connected the first and second grade rooms. Doris developed a headache from the gasoline fumes, and raised her hand to her forehead. This unintentionally activated the triggering mechanism. The bomb exploded, severely injuring Doris, and filling the room with black smoke and pockets of fire.

Immediately following the detonation, the teachers started to shove children into the hallway, and through two open windows onto the grass outside the school, causing chaos as panicked parents tried to break through police lines. The police report states that David opened the door from the connecting bathroom, shot his injured wife in the head and killed her, shot and wounded John Miller, a music teacher who was trying to flee, then closed the bathroom door and killed himself with a shot from a .45 pistol to the head. During the chaos, Doris' burnt body was expelled through a window, and left lying on the front lawn.

When the bomb detonated, substantial force was channeled through loose ceiling tiles into the roof and open windows acting as vents. This significantly mitigated the explosive power of the bomb.

"You could see that the roof tiles had been lifted out of their brackets. –– I don't think that they were planning—or David was planning on the ceiling tiles in the school. Because in the bus, everything was solid in the school bus. There was no give in the school bus. Well, with the window being open, with the ceiling tiles being able to lift up and down, I think that absorbed a lot of the explosion of the gasoline bottle."

— Rich Haskell, Certified Bomb Technician on the 1986 Bombing of Cokeville Elementary School, WyoHistory.org

== Aftermath ==
79 of the 154 hostages were treated for non-fatal injuries, mostly second-degree burns and smoke inhalation. The injured were triaged to several area hospitals in Wyoming, Idaho, and Utah.

== Media ==
- The incident was detailed in the book The Cokeville Miracle: When Angels Intervene by Hartt Wixom and his wife Judene, published by Cedar Fort, Inc., which formed the basis for a CBS made-for-TV movie titled To Save the Children.
- In 2006, the Cokeville Miracle Foundation compiled a book of recollections about the day from parents, emergency workers and former hostages.
- The story was also featured on Unsolved Mysteries, Unexplained Mysteries, and I Survived...
- A movie about the incident, The Cokeville Miracle, was made by filmmaker T. C. Christensen and released on June 5, 2015.

== See also ==
- List of school shootings in the United States by death toll
- Chowchilla kidnapping, a mass kidnapping of schoolchildren by two adults in California that resulted in no deaths of students.
