= Brigham City (film) =

2001 film by Richard Dutcher

- Directed by: Richard Dutcher
- Written by: Richard Dutcher
- Produced by: Richard Dutcher
- Starring: Richard Dutcher; Matthew A. Brown; Wilford Brimley; Carrie Morgan; Jongiorgi Enos; Tayva Patch
- Music by: Sam Cardon
- Production company: Main Street Movie Company
- Distributed by: Zion Films
- Release date: March 30, 2001
- Running time: 108 min.
- Country: United States
- Language: English
- Budget: $900,000
- Box office: $852,206

Brigham City is a 2001 murder mystery independent film. It was written and directed by Richard Dutcher, who also plays in the main role of Sheriff Wes Clayton. It was financed by private investors.

Because of the in-movie descriptions of geography and population, it depicts a fictional Utah town of Brigham City rather than the actual town of Brigham City.

It was filmed in Mapleton, Utah.

== Plot ==
Wes Clayton (Richard Dutcher) is the town sheriff of the small, idyllic town of Brigham City, Utah. Clayton is a devout Latter-Day Saint who is one of seventeen bishops in the town. In Clayton's entire career, there have never been any serious or heinous crimes reported in Brigham City, and generally remains optimistic about the town's friendly nature. His only staff are the witty Peg, his receptionist, Stu (Wilford Brimley), the elderly former sheriff of Brigham City, and Terry, a young and idealistic deputy.

While driving with Terry one day, they stumble upon the body of a young women who has been beaten to death in an isolated shack off the road. Since Wes has no experience in murder investigations and because he wants to keep the murder's influence out of his town, he calls in the FBI from their closest office in Salt Lake City, Utah. Among the two agents sent is Meredith, who confides to Clayton that the killer is likely someone within Brigham City, a claim Clayton doesn't believe. The subsequent investigation turns up little evidence, mostly due to Clayton's lack of resources, but tries to keep up with it as best he can. He also wants to keep the news of the murder private and contained, for fear that the people in the city would assume the worst about each other in their everyday lives.

During the night after a local parade and festival, the body of a local beauty pageant queen is found under a gazebo, raped and strangled. Shocked, Clayton decides to deputize Stu and expands his search to within Brigham City, starting with some migrant workers working for Ralph, a local contractor for Brigham City. Clayton and his team organize an effort to gather fingerprints to test against those found at the crime scenes, using beer bottles collected from a local bar. After collecting all of the bottles, Clayton leaves the team to their respective duties. While on his way back, Stu visits a convenience store and stumbles upon an apparent robbery, finding the store's clerk, a local girl named Jamie, tied up. Before he can act, Stu is shot to death by the killer, who takes Jamie with him. Clayton visits the scene and, at his wits end, decides that the killer is indeed someone within Brigham City and not an outsider. At the police station, Peg confides to Meredith that Clayton is dedicated to the job because he was involved in a fatal car accident that killed his wife and son, and put him into a coma for several days. Knowing what people can lose, Peg declares, keeps Clayton at work.

The following morning, Clayton organizes most male church members and orders them to inquire at every house and search the property for Jamie. This causes a rift within the community, especially when one house, the home to a photographer and his mother, is particularly against them searching. Forcing himself in, Clayton discovers the man's collection of pornography, but finds nothing relating him to Jamie or the murders. Later that night and disheartened at his actions, Clayton returns to the bottles gathered from the bar and resumes collecting the fingerprints off them. Among the containers tested is a thermos brought by Peg's boyfriend, but they turn up nothing.

Clayton later visits Terry's house and talks to him about the fingerprinting efforts. Clayton reveals that he tested Terry's fingerprints from the office and connects him to a criminal who was incarcerated for rape in Arizona several years ago. Clayton deduces that after "Terry" was released, he assumed the identity of a returned missionary who died in a drowning accident, and moved to Brigham City under this new persona. "Terry" admits his guilt and is revealed to be involved with multiple disappearances of other young women around the area, as well as the murders. "Terry" admits Jamie is dead, and put her body, along with the others who haven't been found, in a secluded area within a nearby forest. Preparing to arrest "Terry", Clayton is forced to kill him in front of "Terry's" wife when "Terry" draws a gun on Clayton, with his wife hysterically telling Clayton to leave.

With the investigation finally over, Clayton is emotionally drained, and during Sunday's church service, refuses to partake of sacrament, feeling he does not deserve it. Everyone else sees this and also refuses to take the sacrament, showing that Clayton is not at fault for his actions. Clayton begins to cry at this sight and finally takes the sacrament as everyone else follows with him.

== Cast ==
- Richard Dutcher as Sheriff Wes Clayton
- Matthew A. Brown as Deputy Terry
- Wilford Brimley as Sheriff Stu Udall
- Carrie Morgan as Peg
- Jongiorgi Enos as Ed Gray
- Tayva Patch as Meredith
- Jeff Johnson as Garcia
- Wendy Gardiner as April
- Sterling Brimley as Mayor Glen Udall
- Richard J. Clifford as Steve the Photogapher
- Frank Gerrish as Ralph
- Janice Power as Evelyn
- Rick Macy as Ralph
- Jerry North as Ivan
- Jack North as Max
- Jacque Gray as Carolyn Miller/Miss Brigham
- Barta Heiner as Clara
- Tim Hansen as McCay
- Nick Whitaker as Spencer

== Reception ==
The film has a 71% "Fresh" rating from critics on Rotten Tomatoes, based on 24 reviews. Metacritic, which uses a weighted average, assigned a score of 62 out of 100, based on 8 critics, indicating "generally favorable" reviews.

Lawrence Van Gelder of The New York Times praised the acting of Dutcher, Brown, Brimley, and Morgan, calling it "impeccable." He also described the film as, "an example of concise, skillful filmmaking."

== Welcome to Brigham ==
In 2001, an album of music inspired by the motion picture was released on cd. Dutcher said the songs allowed him to "experience the film through the eyes of other artists and live the story one more time." The participating artists:

- Maren Ord
- Peter Breinholt
- Cherie Call
- Sunfall Festival
- Greg Simpson
- Kalai
- Julie de Azevedo
- Ryan Shupe & the Rubberband
- Shane Jackman
