= Baton Rouge Louisiana Temple =

Temple of the LDS church

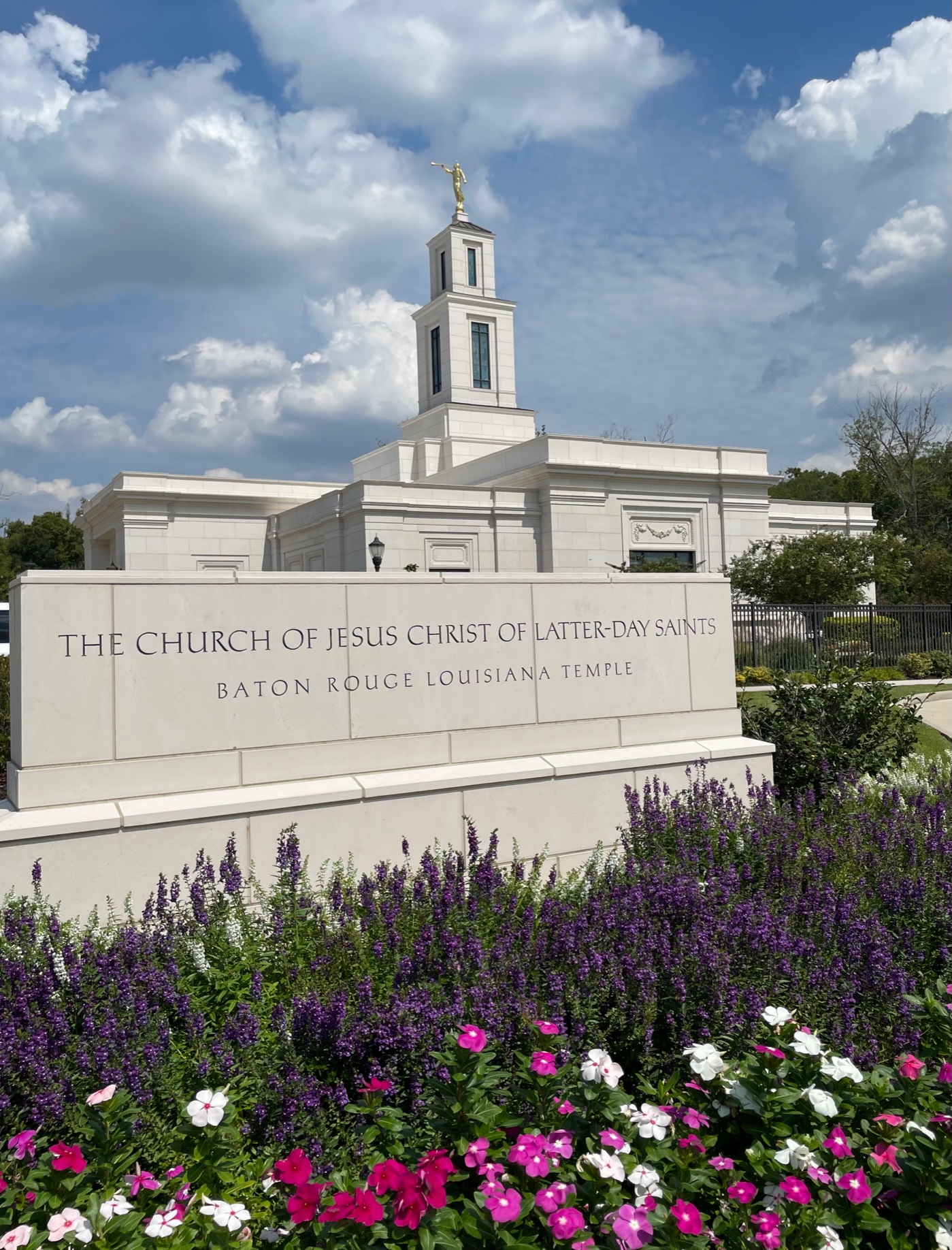
- Baton Rouge Louisiana Temple
- Interactive map of Baton Rouge Louisiana Temple
- Number: 94
- Dedication: July 16, 2000, by Gordon B. Hinckley
- Site: 6.3 acres (2.5 ha)
- Floor area: 10,890 ft^{2} (1,012 m^{2})
- Height: 71 ft (22 m)
- Official website • News & images

Church chronology
← Veracruz Mexico Temple	Baton Rouge Louisiana Temple	→ Oklahoma City Oklahoma Temple

Additional information
- Announced: October 14, 1998, by Gordon B. Hinckley
- Groundbreaking: May 8, 1999, by Monte J. Brough
- Open house: July 1–8, 2000; October 26–November 2, 2019
- Rededicated: November 17, 2019, by Quentin L. Cook
- Current president: Kevin B. Pack
- Designed by: Paul Tessier & Associates and Church A&E Services.
- Location: Baton Rouge, Louisiana, United States
- Coordinates: 30°21′45.59039″N 91°6′30.18599″W
- Exterior finish: Imperial Danby White marble from Vermont
- Design: Classic modern, single-spire design
- Baptistries: 1
- Ordinance rooms: 2 (two-stage progressive)
- Sealing rooms: 2

The Baton Rouge Louisiana Temple is the 94th operating temple of the Church of Jesus Christ of Latter-day Saints (LDS Church), and is located at 10339 Highland Road in Baton Rouge. The temple was announced on October 14, 1998, by the church's First Presidency. A groundbreaking ceremony, to signify beginning of construction, was held on May 8, 1999, with Monte J. Brough, a church general authority, presiding. The temple was dedicated by church president Gordon B. Hinckley on July 16, 2000, and rededicated on November 17, 2019, by Quentin L. Cook of the Quorum of the Twelve Apostles, following renovations.

At the time of its dedication, the temple served approximately 24,000 church members across Louisiana and parts of southern Mississippi, including stakes in New Orleans, Alexandria, Denham Springs, Monroe, Gulfport, Hattiesburg, and Jackson.

The temple has a 10,700-square-foot floor plan with two ordinance rooms, two sealing rooms, and a baptistry. Originally built using Imperial Danby White marble, the temple was extensively renovated beginning in 2018, with exterior limestone recladding, a raised steeple, and the addition of art glass windows featuring shell and magnolia motifs.

== History ==
In 1841, the church's first missionary in the stated of Louisiana, Harrison Sagers, arrived. A few joined the church but eventually left the state to gather to gather with the main body of its members. New Orleans was the port of entry for most early British converts. Starting around 1841, about 17,500 church members immigrated to the United States through New Orleans. Most members in the city were either recent immigrants who had not yet continued westward or church agents helping them do so. After the last wave of emigrants left New Orleans in 1855, the church's presence in Louisiana ended until missionaries were reassigned there in 1895. As of early 2025, more than 30,000 members live in the state.

The First Presidency announced the intent to construct the temple on October 14, 1998. On May 8, 1999, a groundbreaking ceremony was held, with Monte J. Brough, president of the church's North America Southeast Area, presiding. The temple is on a 6.3-acre site located at 10339 Highland Road, adjacent to a meetinghouse and near a 103-acre wetlands reserve.

Following construction, a public open house was held from July 1 to 8, 2000, with approximately 18,550 visitors attending, including local officials, interfaith leaders, and community members. The temple was dedicated in four sessions by church president Hinckley on July 16, 2000, with a cornerstone ceremony held prior to the first session.

When it was dedicated, the temple served approximately 24,000 Louisiana church members in the New Orleans, Alexandria, Baton Rouge, Denham Springs, and Monroe, as well as Mississippi stakes centered in Gulfport, Hattiesburg, and Jackson. The temple is a single-story building with 10,700 square feet of floor space. It includes two ordinance rooms, two sealing rooms, and a baptistry. The exterior has Imperial Danby White marble quarried in Vermont.

On June 27, 2017, the church announced that the temple would close for renovations starting in February 2018, with completion anticipated in 2019. Following completion of the renovations, an open house was held from October 26 to November 2, 2019 (excluding Sunday), and the temple was rededicated by Quentin L. Cook on November 17, 2019.

In 2020, like all the church's others, the Baton Rouge Louisiana Temple was closed for a time in response to the COVID-19 pandemic.

== Design and architecture ==
The temple is on a 6.37-acre property, adjacent to a meetinghouse, and bordered by a wetlands nature reserve. Its grounds are landscaped with Southern native flora, including flowering crepe myrtles and magnolia trees.

The temple is a single-story building originally built with Imperial Danby White marble quarried in Vermont. As part of the renovations, the exterior was changed to beige-colored limestone. The steeple was raised by 10 feet, and new art glass windows featuring shell and magnolia flower motifs were added. These upgrades improved the building envelope and enhanced the symmetry of the entry and tower design.

The temple has two ordinance rooms, two sealing rooms, and a baptistry. Symbolic design features include magnolia flowers, representing purity and local culture, and shell motifs, to support spiritual reflection. These motifs appear in the art glass windows and throughout the interior.

=== Renovations ===
Following an announcement by the church on June 27, 2017, a significant renovation project started in February 2018. The renovations included key areas of structural improvements, a comprehensive interior redesign, upgraded mechanical systems, and enhancements to the temple’s aesthetic character.

The renovation also included raising the temple’s steeple by 10 feet, which improved the architectural proportions and visual prominence of the building. Additionally, the exterior was redone in beige-colored limestone, and new art glass windows featuring shell and magnolia flower motifs were installed.

The renovated temple was rededicated on November 17, 2019, by Quentin L. Cook of the Quorum of the Twelve Apostles.

== Temple presidents ==
The church's temples are directed by a temple president and matron, each generally serving for a term of three years. The president and matron oversee the administration of temple operations and provide guidance and training for both temple patrons and staff.

Serving from 2000 to 2005, the first president of the Baton Rouge Louisiana Temple was Doye G. Brumfield, with Alicia M. Brumfield serving as matron. As of 2025, Kevin B. Pack is the president, with Cindy A. Pack being the matron.

== Admittance ==
Following renovations, the church announced on May 3, 2019 that a public open house would be held from October 26 through November 2, 2019 (excluding Sunday). The temple was rededicated by Quentin L. Cook on November 17, 2019.

Like all the church's temples, it is not used for Sunday worship services. To members of the church, temples are regarded as sacred houses of the Lord. Once dedicated, only church members with a current temple recommend can enter for worship.

== See also ==
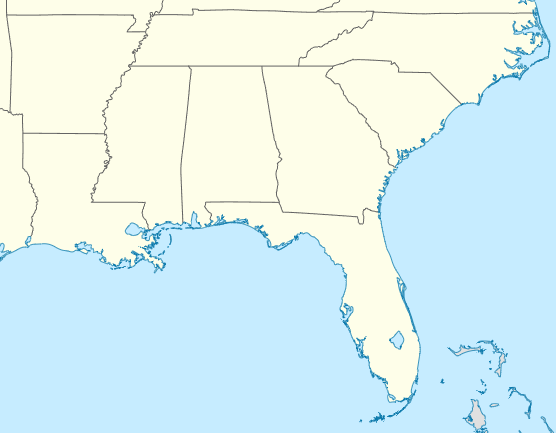
Temples in the Southeastern United States
- = Operating
- = Under construction
- = Announced
- = Temporarily Closed
- Comparison of temples of The Church of Jesus Christ of Latter-day Saints
- List of temples of The Church of Jesus Christ of Latter-day Saints
- List of temples of The Church of Jesus Christ of Latter-day Saints by geographic region
- Temple architecture (Latter-day Saints)
- The Church of Jesus Christ of Latter-day Saints in Louisiana
- The Church of Jesus Christ of Latter-day Saints in Mississippi

== Additional reading ==
- "Dedication dates announced for temples in Mexico, U.S.", Church News, May 20, 2000
- Weaver, Sarah Jane (July 22, 2000), "Baton Rouge temple: 'a house of refuge'", Church News
- Hart, John L. (September 17, 2005), "After Katrina's fury, relief on a grand scale", Church News
- Heaps, Julie Dockstader (September 17, 2005), "The extra mile", Church News
- "Temple moments: Keeping it going", Church News, February 25, 2006
