= Elam Luddington =

American missionary (1806-1893)

Elam Luddington, Jr. (also spelled Ludington; November 23, 1806 – March 22, 1893) was a Mormon pioneer, officer in the Mormon Battalion, first missionary of the Church of Jesus Christ of Latter-day Saints (LDS Church) to preach in Thailand, and 2nd City Marshall for Salt Lake City.

Luddington was born in Harwinton, Connecticut, to Elam Luddington, Sr. and Lena Monger. Luddington traveled to Nauvoo and met Joseph Smith, Jr. in the winter of 1840. On May 16 of that year, he was baptized by Smith into the Church of Jesus Christ of Latter Day Saints. He was ordained as an Elder that fall, and shortly thereafter Luddington and Eli G. Terrill were assigned as missionaries to the city of New Orleans (making them among the first Mormon missionaries to proselyte in the state of Louisiana). Luddington spent nearly three years in New Orleans. In June 1844, Joseph Smith and his brother, Hyrum Smith, requested that he travel as a missionary to Quincy, Illinois, in order to gather funds for the completion of the Nauvoo Temple.

After Joseph Smith's death, Luddington followed the leadership of Brigham Young and the remaining members of the Quorum of the Twelve Apostles. In September 1844 Luddington returned briefly to New Orleans together with Theodore Turley per Young's request, though this excursion to Louisiana lasted only 29 days. When he returned to Nauvoo, Luddington was ordained as a High Priest. In January 1845 Luddington was sent on his third mission with William Hyde as his companion, to visit the Saints in Mississippi and encourage them to gather at Nauvoo. They fulfilled their objective in less than two months and returned to Nauvoo.

Luddington later followed Young and the other Apostles west to the Salt Lake Valley in Utah Territory. During the Mexican–American War in 1846 and 1847, Luddington was a 1st lieutenant in the Mormon Battalion. Members of his family marched with the battalion (including his wife, Mary, (served as laundress); his mother; daughter (Angeline); and "one other" child. He first reached the Salt Lake Valley in 1847 with the sick detachments of the Mormon Battalion, but quickly crossed the plains once again to return to Winter Quarters. In 1849 Luddington again made the trek, now with his family, as part of Silas Richards' Company, in which Luddington served as a captain of ten.

In 1853, Young called four Latter-day Saints, Luddington, Chauncey W. West, Franklin Denny and Levi Savage, to serve LDS Church missions in India and Indochina. The four arrived by ship in Kolkata, India on April 26, 1853. Luddington and Savage tried to reach Siam via Yangon, Burma, but the ship sprang a leak and they were forced to return to India. After the ship was repaired, Luddington and Savage arrived in Yangon on August 10, 1853. In late September 1853 Matthew McCune (a member of the British military) and Elder Luddington severed Elder Savage from the church. This forced Elder Savage to depart Rangoon (Yangon) for Maulmain, Burma. While Elder Savage was in Maulmain, Elder Luddington departed Rangoon for Bangkok.

Luddington arrived in Bangkok by ship on June 4, 1854, almost a year after he had left the United States. He tried to learn to speak Thai, but found it difficult and was forced to limit his preaching to Europeans. During his four months in Siam, Luddington baptized James Trail, the captain of the ship he arrived on, and Trail's wife. Luddington reported that he was stoned twice and poisoned once by his opponents in Thailand.

Luddington returned to Utah Territory in 1855. Luddington practiced plural marriage and was married to three wives. He died in Salt Lake City.

== Sources ==
- Journal of Levi Savage Jr. Savage, Levi. "Diaries, 1852-1903" MSS 417, L. Tom Perry Special Collections, Harold B. Lee Library, Brigham Young University.
