= Escape from Germany =

2024 film by T. C. Christensen

- Promotional poster
- Directed by: T. C. Christensen
- Written by: T. C. Christensen
- Based on: Mine Angels Round About by Terry Bohle Montague (2000)
- Produced by: T. C. Christensen; Eric S. Johnston
- Starring: Paul Wuthrich; David McConnell
- Production companies: Samuel Goldwyn Films; Remember Films
- Distributed by: Susan Tuckett Media
- Release date: April 11, 2024 (United States)
- Running time: 97 minutes
- Country: United States
- Languages: English; German
- Budget: under $1 million
- Box office: $2,610,405

Escape from Germany is a 2024 American historical drama film written and directed by T. C. Christensen, based on the book "Mine Angels Round About" by Terry Bohle Montauge.

Escape from Germany was released in select theaters across the United States on 11 April 2024.

== Premise ==
In August 1939, 79 American missionaries from the Church of Jesus Christ of Latter-Day Saints get stranded inside Nazi Germany on the eve of outbreak of WWII and must escape to neighboring countries while Hitler's army is closing German borders.

== Plot ==
In August 1939, Mormon Elder Branch President Norman Seibold was sent to Prewar Germany as a missionary in Stuttgart where there was a parade with a multitude of German citizens saluting to Hitler, in which he was struck by a Gestapo officer for failing to salute. Later, he met with Elder Anderson at the train station and encountered a book burning rally in which a Gestapo officer confiscated Anderson's Articles of Faith Book and tossed it into the fire. Soon, word has spread that Nazi Germany planned to invade Poland, Elder Richard Barnes of the Frankfurt Missionaries Office reached out to US Ambassador at the Embassy but failed to convince him. Barnes then received a directive from President M. Douglas Wood to get all their missionaries out of Germany. Later, Seibold and Anderson were ordered to evacuate and leave for Holland while urging other missionaries to flee, including a German couple who were too stubborn to leave their homeland. They eventually agreed to leave. They soon learned that a fellow German Elder was conscripted. Elsewhere, German Branch President Biehl managed to get British Sister Erma Rosenhan a stamp of approval to leave Germany for London, however, he was conscripted by the Nazis and was set to depart.

Seibold was later briefed by Wood to search for all the missionaries throughout West Germany. He found it difficult and was prepared to give up, but after watching a Gestapo Officer accost a Jewish Family, he regained his confidence and continued his search, managing to find some missionaries after whistling a tune of "Do What is Right". With some fellow missionaries in his care, he began traveling by train to various cities. Back in Frankfurt, Wood and Barnes heard a broadcast that Holland would close their borders at midnight. Seibold and the others arrived at the station in Emmerich where they were set to leave for Holland, meanwhile in Frankfurt, Wood immediately ordered the office to be closed down and evacuated while everyone inside was clearing the building. As Seibold distributed cash to his fellow missionaries at the train station, they were confronted by a Bahnschutzpolizei guard who attempted to confiscate their cash, but Seibold stood up to him and demanded to meet with a Military Police officer. Seibold was brought to a Captain at the station where the Captain blasted the Railway Guard for his outrageous accusations and gave Seibold a stamp of approval to leave with his fellow missionaries. Sister Rosenham soon reached Holland, desperate and broke, but soon encountered a Mormon Elder looking for fellow missionaries to enter from Germany.

Seibold continued his mission to keep searching for missionaries and learn that the Dutch have closed their borders to Germany, only allowing Dutch citizens in. After being dropped off at a train station, Seibold learned that all trains are being used to transport troops. Seibold then decided to change his destination to Denmark during which they managed to find a train and hop on board. Wood and his family and fellow missionaries arrived in Rostock to learn that all trains are being used for troop transport and decided to steal a train engine, and rather than make the long trek to the Danish border, they chose to ride to Warnemünde to take a ferry out of Germany, with the police hot on their trail. They managed to reach the boat leaving Germany then arrived at the Missionaries Office in Copenhagen and learned from Apostle Smith that 29 more missionaries are still on German soil and the fighting won't start until they're out of Germany.

Seibold and his group finally reached the checkpoint at the German-Danish border, where Seibold managed to get six of the Elders past the checkpoint but learned that the Germans were closing the Danish border soon. Regardless, Seibold made the decision to return to Germany to continue his mission in finding the remaining missionaries still stranded. Upon completing his mission, he went back to the German-Danish border where he was almost arrested, however, he managed to convince the Guard otherwise with the Stamp of Approval he received in Emmerich and reunited with his fellow congregation in Copenhagen.

=== Epilogue ===
Nine hours after Seibold left Germany, on September 1, 1939, the Nazi's invaded Poland and World War II began. The evacuation of the German mission took eight days. As written in World at War, it states that Hitler planned the invasion a week in advance, but for some reason it was delayed. As the missionaries gathered in Denmark, Apostle Smith had them sing the hymn "I'll Go Where You Want Me to Go," then directed them to other missions elsewhere, mainly in the United States. Those that served the longest were heading home. Smith predicted that because Denmark sheltered the missionaries during the crisis, it would not suffer the hardships of the coming war in the same manner other European countries would. His prediction proved valid. The Wood family were called to Sweden to assist in closing the mission there. President Wood became a seminary teacher and a principal. His wife, Evelyn, became famous for her speed reading course known as "Evelyn Wood Reading Dynamics". Adelbert and Elizabeth Goltz made it safely back to America. Elizabeth died two years later. It states that had they stayed in Germany, she would have never seen her family again. When research began for this film, Sister Rosenhan was the only missionary from this story still alive and available to be interviewed. She died before the filming began at the age of 105. Elder McOmber fooled the Gestapo agent at the border station and managed to smuggle the film out of Germany. Elder Barnes joined the war and fought during the Invasion of Normandy, in which he commanded 7000 troops and helped set up refugee centers and LDS Church meetinghouses in East Germany. President Biehl was killed in combat. After the war, two of the missionaries married German women. Elder Nephi H. Duersch married Bertha Raisch, who worked at the Mission Office in Frankfurt. They lived the rest of their lives in Logan, Utah. Elder Geren Howell stayed in contact with Liselotte Heitele by writing to each other, but contact was scarce for four years during the war. When the war ended, they resumed writing each other. In 1947, Liselotte arrived in Salt Lake City and they were married shortly after. They lived in Idaho and had four children. Elder Anderson's statement regarding the Hitler Fast, Nazis rewriting the New Testament to show that Jesus was not a Jew, Hitler liking the 12th Article of Faith and the Church's genealogy program, and Elder's basketball in the Olympics, were shown to be true. Norm Seibold lived in Idaho the rest of his days. He married Ruby Davenport and they had six children. She died in 1971. He later remarried to Dona Darley Ostegar. He is credited with helping 21 missionaries flee Germany. 45 years after the events, Norm commented that whenever he finds himself in large crowds, he still looks for lost missionaries.

"I was led by the Spirit, not knowing beforehand the things which I should do. Nevertheless, I went forth..."

-1 Nephi 4:6-7

== Cast ==
- Paul Wuthrich as Elder Norman G. Seibold (1915–2003) who was tasked with locating the scattered missionaries and evacuating them from Germany
- David McConnell as (West German Mission) President M. Douglas Wood, Seibold's supervisor
- Whitney Palmer as Evelyn Wood, mission president's wife
- Scarlett Hazen as Carol Wood, daughter
- Sebastian Barr as Elder Anderson, newly recruited missionary
- Landon Henneman as Elder Richard Barnes, missionary director of the Frankfurt Office
- Brad Witbeck as Elder Ferryle McOmber, missionary who was filming various events in Germany
- Chase Elwood as Elder Nephi H. Duersch, missionary in Frankfurt
- Zechariah Combs as Elder Garen Howell, missionary
- Deveney Reber as Sister Erma Rosenhan, an English missionary in Germany under Biehl's watch
- Kevin Kirschenmann as President Walter Biehl, the Head of the German Mormon church
- Henning Fischer as Gestapo officer
- Mary Jane Wadley as Sister Elizabeth Goltz, a German Mormon with her husband, Adelbert
- Terrence Stone as Elder Adelbert Goltz, a German Mormon with his wife, Elizabeth
- Loren Lambert as Elder Ruf, a German Mormon who was made Branch President in Seibold's stead
- Paul Grace as Apostle Joseph Fielding Smith

== Production ==
According to the film's closing credits and as stated in the magazine LDS Living, most of the extras in Escape from Germany were actual descendants of the real-life escaping missionaries.

With the film's budget being under $1 million, some of the funding needed for its making came from a private investor in Dallas who was also a member of The Church of Jesus Christ of Latter-day Saints.

Principal photography took place in Utah and Budapest.

== Release ==
The film was released in select cinemas in the United States on 11 April 2024 by Susan Tuckett Media.

== Reception ==
=== Box office ===
Escape from Germany grossed $168,100 during its opening weekend in the United States. As of 4 September 2024, it made the total of $2.6 million.

=== Critical response ===
Christie Cronan wrote in her positive review for Common Sense Media: "While Escape from Germany could easily be labeled as propaganda for The Church of Jesus Christ of Latter-day Saints, with its heavy-handed faith-based dialogue and missionary characters, it's also a WWII film without brutal war violence."

Sean P. Means of The Movie Cricket criticised the film: "Christensen's habit of turning every plot turn into a Sunday school lesson is on display here — with every twist of fate or fortunate coincidence taken as a sign of God's hand. Miracles are good for sermons, but they make for unsubtle screenwriting."
