= Ephraim's Rescue =

- Film poster
- Directed by: T. C. Christensen
- Written by: T. C. Christensen
- Produced by: T. C. Christensen; Ron Tanner
- Starring: Darin Southam; James Gaisford; Katherine Nelson; Mia Selway; Travis Eberhard
- Cinematography: T. C. Christensen
- Edited by: Tanner Christensen
- Music by: Paul Cardall
- Production company: Remember Films
- Distributed by: Excel Entertainment Group
- Release date: May 31, 2013
- Running time: 115 minutes
- Country: United States
- Language: English

Ephraim's Rescue is a religious historical drama film by T. C. Christensen, released in 2013 by Excel Entertainment Group. It is based on the true stories of Mormon pioneers Ephraim Hanks and Thomas Dobson and their experiences in the handcart brigades. The film was released in select theaters across the United States in the spring of 2013.

== Plot ==
The film focuses on the lives of Ephraim Hanks and Thomas Dobson, telling their stories in parallel.

Hanks, a rebellious young man, joins the U.S. Navy after a violent confrontation with his father. Three years later, he returns home to find that his father has died and his brother Sidney has joined the Church of Jesus Christ of Latter-day Saints. Believing Sidney to be in trouble, his mother sends Ephraim to go and save him, but Ephraim ends up converting also and is baptized by Sidney.

At the same time, eight year old Thomas Dobson is baptized in his hometown of Preston, Lancashire and suffers for his faith. In 1856, a man announces that the Dobsons are departing for Zion (Utah) with the handcart brigade. Thomas, now an adult, has no desire to travel to an uncivilized area miles away from home, but his mother convinces him it is God's will.

Ephraim Hanks joins the Mormon Battalion and becomes a prominent member of the church. When he hears the handcart people are in trouble, he agrees to go and help, where his story intersects with that of Dobson.

== Cast ==
- Darin Southam as Ephraim Hanks
- Richard Benedict as old Ephraim Hanks
- James Gaisford as Thomas Dobson
- Koleman Stinger as young Thomas Dobson
- Katherine Nelson as Alice Dobson
- Travis Eberhard as Albert

== Production ==
Written and directed by T. C. Christensen, and produced by Ron Tanner and Christensen, Ephraim's Rescue debuted on May 31, 2013, in select theaters in Utah, and then across the United States. The film was subsequently released on DVD and Blu-ray for distribution by Excel Entertainment Group through Deseret Book and affiliated retailers.

== Reviews ==
Ephraim's Rescue received mixed to positive reviews. Sean Means of the Salt Lake Tribune felt that it was similar to 17 Miracles but "the results this time are less dramatic and more like an illustrated Sunday school lesson."
