= The Fighting Preacher =

- Film poster
- Directed by: T. C. Christensen
- Produced by: T.C. Christensen; Ron Tanner
- Starring: Charley Boon; Kenna Dawn; David McConnell
- Cinematography: T.C. Christensen
- Distributed by: Purdie Distribution
- Release date: July 24, 2019
- Country: United States
- Language: English
- Box office: $955,781

The Fighting Preacher is a 2019 drama film written and directed by T. C. Christensen and starring David McConnell and Kenna Dawn.

The film focuses on Willard Bean and his wife, Rebecca, who are in involved in a 25-year missionary service in Palmyra, New York. Palmyra, which had previously driven out the last Mormons 80 years previous refuses to sell the couple supplies and harasses them. With a background in boxing, Bean finds a new way to reach the people.

== Plot ==
Willard Bean, the former world's middle weight boxing champion and his new wife, Rebecca are called in 1915 by LDS Church President Joseph F. Smith to serve five years in the Eastern States Mission. Their specific assignment is to move to Palmyra, New York to take care of the Joseph Smith home and farm including the Sacred Grove which the church recently purchased, and, if possible, purchase the Hill Cumorah. Having recently married, and facing such a big challenge, they hesitate, but accept the call.

They arrive in Palmyra with optimism and settle into the home, but are surprised to immediately encounter fierce opposition from the local residents. The merchants refuse to sell them any goods forcing them to travel to the next town, and Rebecca, now pregnant, can't find any local midwife willing to help with the delivery. Finally, days before the due date, a woman with a good opinion of the church offers to help. A daughter is born, whom they name Palmyra.

Willard meets the two owners of the Hill Cumorah, but one demands an out-of-reach price and the other owner drives Willard away with his shotgun declaring he will "Never sell to the Mormons--Never!"

Six years later, the Beans still have had very little success in getting acceptance from the locals and their mission is extended. They enroll Palmyra in school where she is bullied by the students and shunned by the teacher who forces her to sit in the back with her desk nailed to the floor facing out the window. No children will play with her. Still, the Beans doggedly strive to win the town over. Willard developed his never-give-up attitude from his boxing career.

Willard decides to use his boxing talent and hosts a boxing match challenging all takers. This is enthusiastically received by the townspeople who think this is finally their chance to drive out the Mormons. However, Willard handily defeats them all in rapid succession until the last three challengers bolt from the room in fear. Unfortunately, this doesn't improve relations, but instead embitters the locals even more.

Finally, Palmyra suggests they approach their neighbors with love. Rebecca bakes pies which are delivered to many people, including the Hill Cumorah owner, "Never," with his shotgun. Willard begins helping neighbors with home repairs and farm chores and gives away produce they've grown. Rebecca cares for a sick elderly woman and volunteers with the Red Cross to help poor families. Palmyra makes a cloth doll for a girl in school who has mercilessly taunted her. This softens the people's hearts and they gradually begin to accept the Bean family. Palmyra now gets invited by her schoolmates to play with them.

Later, the owner of part of the Hill Cumorah who demanded the exorbitant price dies and his heirs sell their share for a reasonable amount. The other owner, "Never," softened by Rebecca's pies, apparently just gives away his portion to the church. Twenty-four years later in 1939, the Beans get a letter from church headquarters thanking them for their service and releasing them from their mission. The Beans are heartbroken that they must return to Utah. By this time, the Bean family have become beloved members of the community and Willard has even been the president of the Lion's Club. The town hosts a farewell ceremony honoring the Beans and declaring they will never be forgotten.

== Cast ==
- David McConnell ... Willard Bean
- Cassidy Hubert ... Rebecca Bean
- Richard Benedict ... Pliny Sexton
- Steve Anderson ... Thomas Winegar
- Charley Boon ... Buster
- Kenna Dawn ... Palmyra
- David Stevens ... James Walsh

== Reception ==
Sean Means of The Salt Lake Tribune praised Christensen's work on the film, saying he "infuses a gentle humor to the Beans’ story, capturing Willard’s good-natured sarcasm" and that the "deeply faithful will appreciate the occasional name-dropping."

The film was a finalist for the 2019 AML Award for narrative feature film.
