= South High School (Utah) =

Former high school in Utah, United States

Coordinates: 40°44′07″N 111°53′15″W

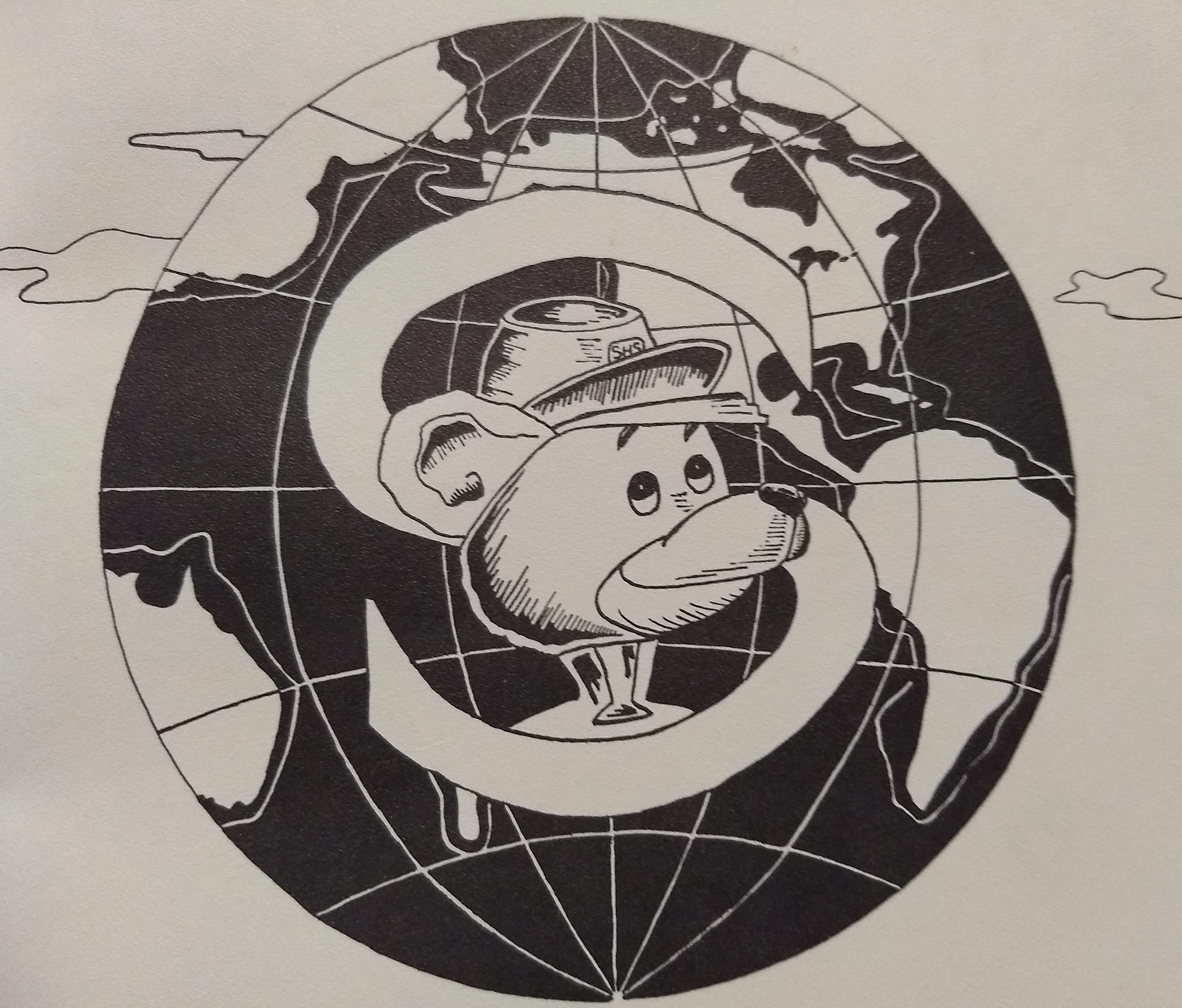
South High Cub

South High School was a high school in Salt Lake City, Utah, which operated from 1931 to 1988. The school was located on the southern end of Salt Lake City proper, at 1575 S. State Street. The school is now a campus of Salt Lake Community College, with a section dedicated to the Salt Lake City School District's Innovations Early College High School and Career and Technical Center, both at the south end of the campus, on the first and second floor, respectively.

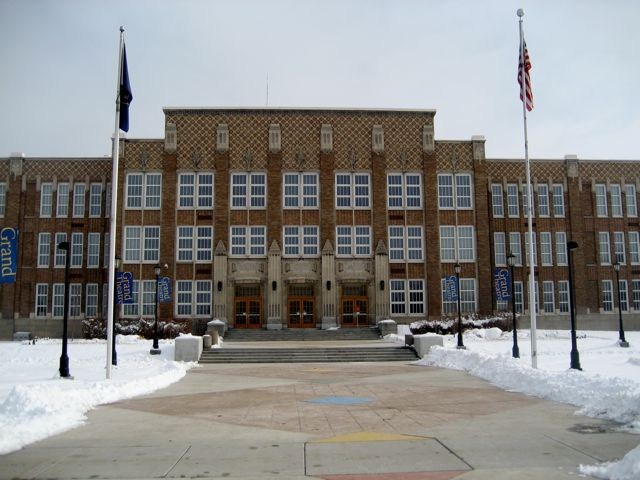
Main Entrance to South City Campus (former South High School)

== Beginnings ==
In 1928 the Salt Lake school district decided to build a new high school to accommodate the increasing population of high school age children. The Great Depression put a hold on these plans, but when it was learned that the LDS High School, a private school with about 1,000 students, was to close in 1931, the plan was revived. The South High School building was constructed in 1929-1931 on the site of the "Original Pioneer Nursery" established by John Chamberlain. Land was surveyed on June 16, 1930, and ground was first broken on June 30, 1930. The edifice was erected in the record time of fourteen months at an estimated cost of $1.5 million. South High school opened its doors in the fall of 1931 (for the class of 1932).

The high school was built with many art deco features. It was a large school with multiple wings. The three-story portion of the original structure formed a rough shape of the letter "E". The interior had some unusual features, including wide double ramps, instead of stairs, connecting each floor; arched hallways with highly textured plaster work; and red and black checkerboard tiled hallway floors. The auditorium was much the same as a playhouse, complete with balcony and opera alcoves on either side of the stage. Extensions were added in the 1950s and early 1960s, including a large gymnasium with seating balconies, with a total seating capacity in the thousands.

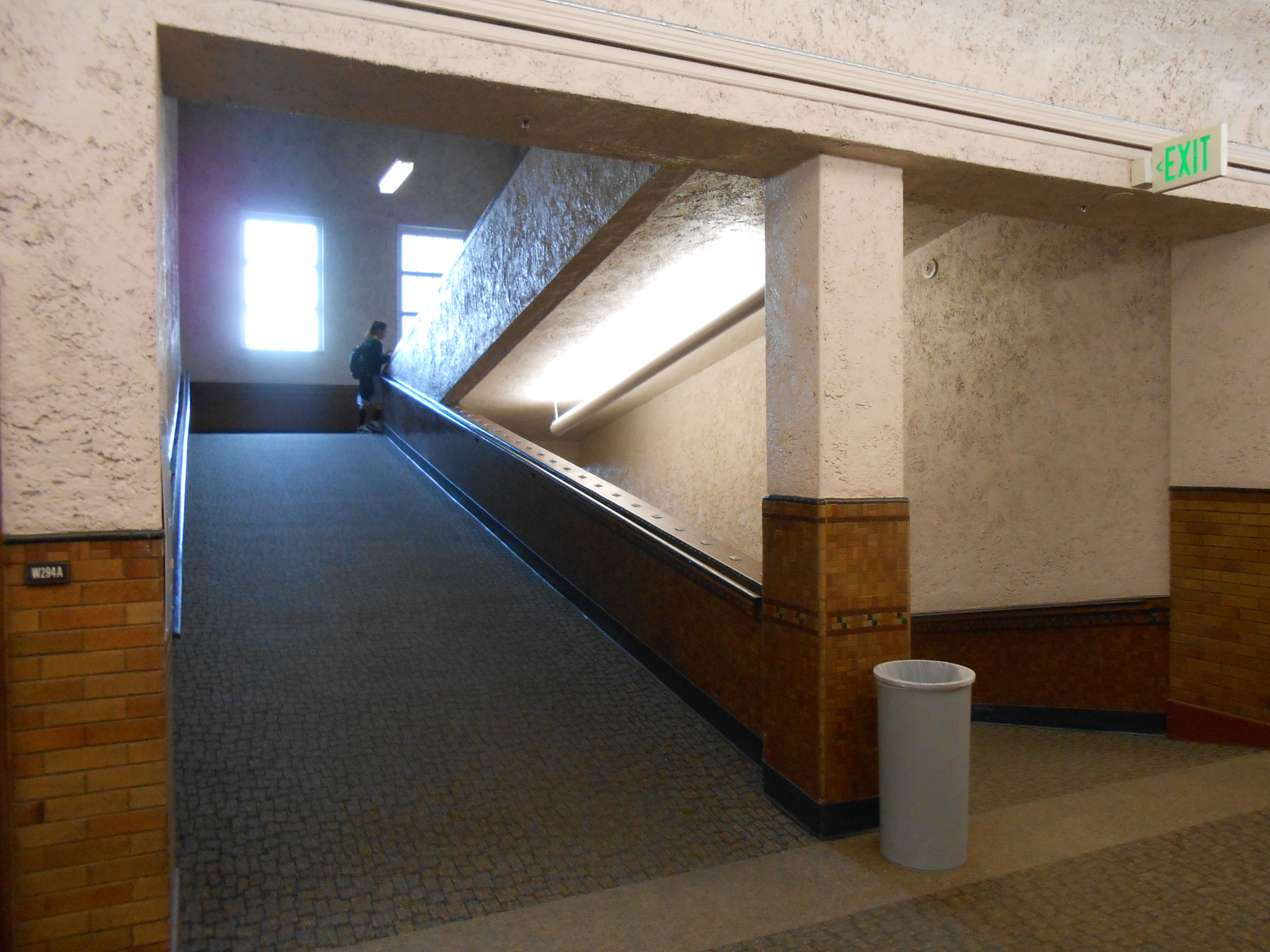
Inside South High School

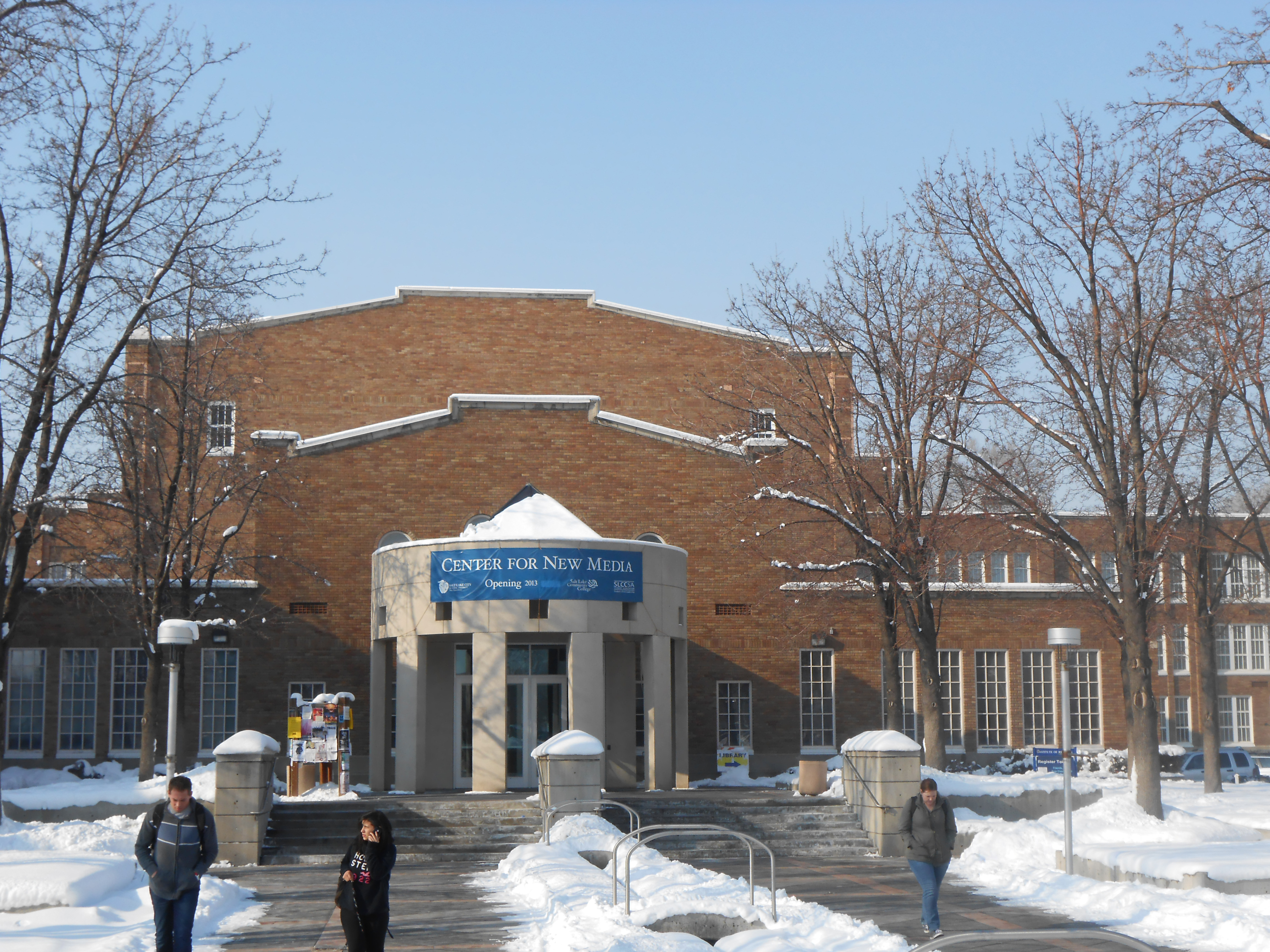
Rear entrance to South High School

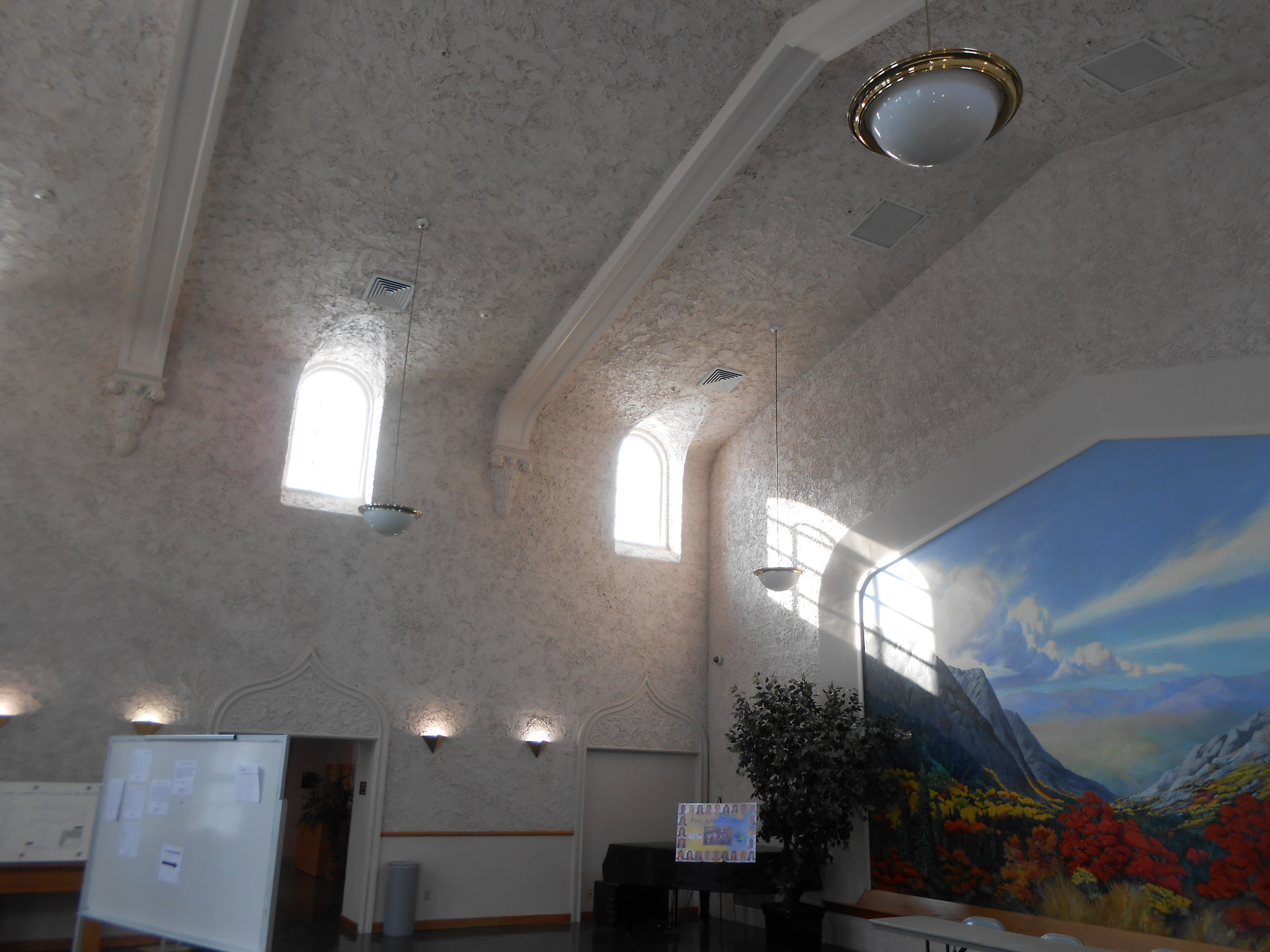
Foyer inside rear entrance to South High School

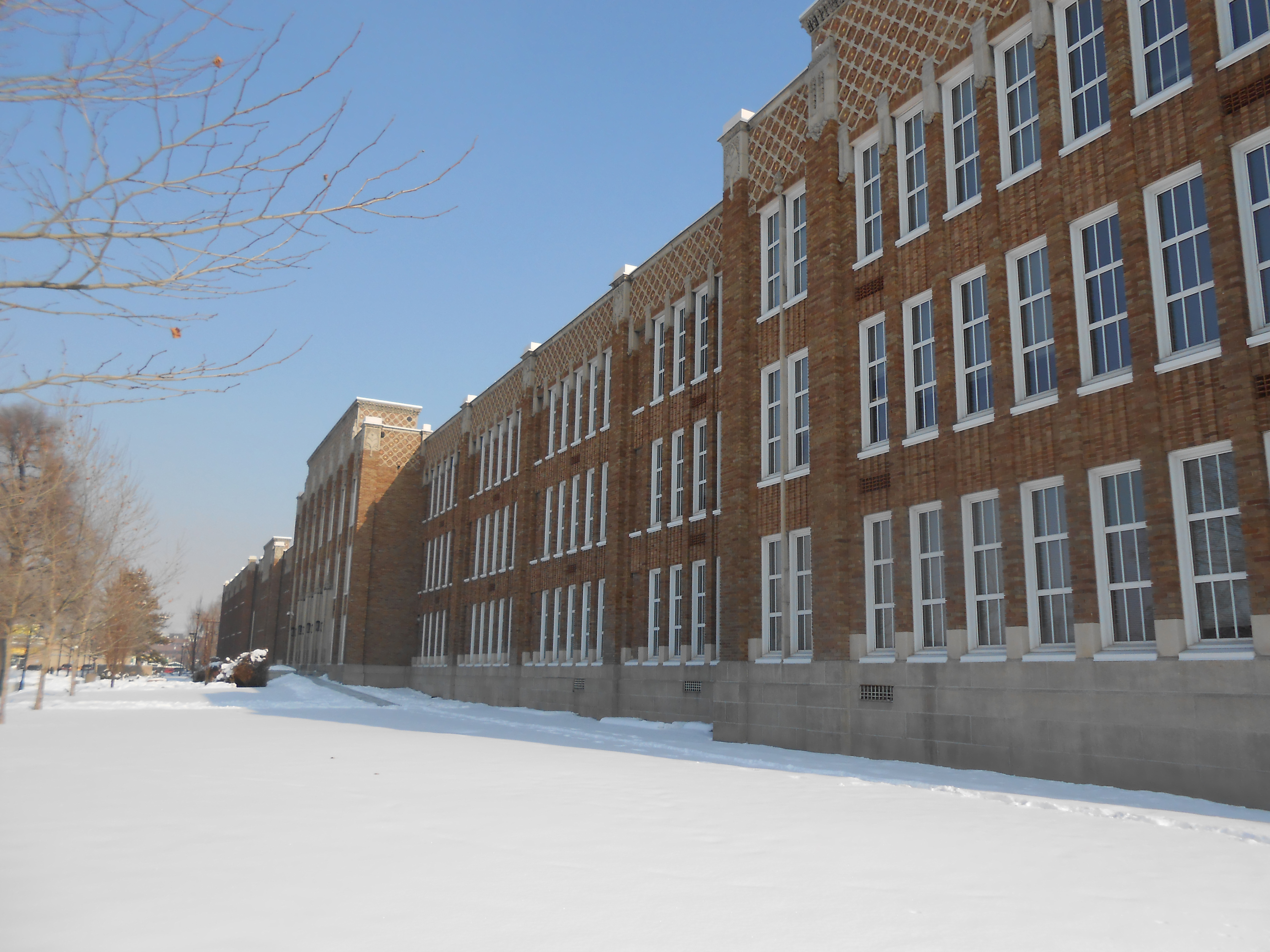
Front of South High School

== School mascot ==
The mascot for South High School was a Bear Cub, and South High students were usually referred to as Cubs. The moniker was given when a local newspaper article about Dr. Devoe Woolf, South High's principal at the time, metaphorically referenced the South High students as his "Woolf Cubs", alluding to the newness of the school. It was not long before the mascot was a Bear Cub. Some of the sports uniforms worn by South High teams, especially by baseball teams, used designs similar to those found on the Chicago Cubs' uniforms, which also uses a bear cub mascot. Although always popular, it would be some time before the cub moniker was official. Pre-dating this change was the official "Rebel" and "Southern" theme of the school, linking references to the Antebellum US south to the school. Throughout the history of the school, depictions of the Cub mascot typically showed the bear cub wearing a Civil War-era battle cap, often colored grey and presumably Confederate. Carrying on the southern theme, the school's spring dance was called "Plantation". South High's colors were Yale blue and white.

== Student body ==
South High had normal enrollment in its early years, but saw significantly increased numbers in the 1950s and early 1960s, so much so that a major expansion was completed in the early 1960s, which included a large new gym, swimming pool, cafeteria and library.

From 1931 until the end of the '74-'75 school year South High facilitated grade 10 through 12. Starting in the fall of 1975, as part of a district-wide change, South High shifted to also include grade 9.

More than 36,000 students graduated from South High School between 1931 and 1988.

South High students largely came from working class families. It was not uncommon for students to have parents who came from other countries, such as Germany, Greece, or Japan. South High was known as the most racially cosmopolitan school in Utah, although the total numbers of African Americans was quite small compared to most large American cities. The school also had a vibrant Polynesian contingent (Tongan and Samoan), as well as Hispanic and South East Asian contingents. The latter were largely part of the group sometimes called "boat people", referring to those who fled communist advances in South East Asia by watercraft. These students started enrolling at South in the late 1970s and early 1980s. During this time, South High saw dwindling enrollment, due in large part to the lack of families with school age children located within its boundaries.

== Sports ==
South High won the following men's state championships:

Basketball

- 1950, 1957

Baseball

- 1944, 1946, 1950, 1955, 1974

Cross country

- 1977

Track

- 1947, 1948, 1949, 1950, 1952, 1955, 1966, 1968, 1978

South was in class 4A, the top tier of Utah high school sports, through 1977. Afterwards it was demoted to 3A due to dwindling enrollment numbers.

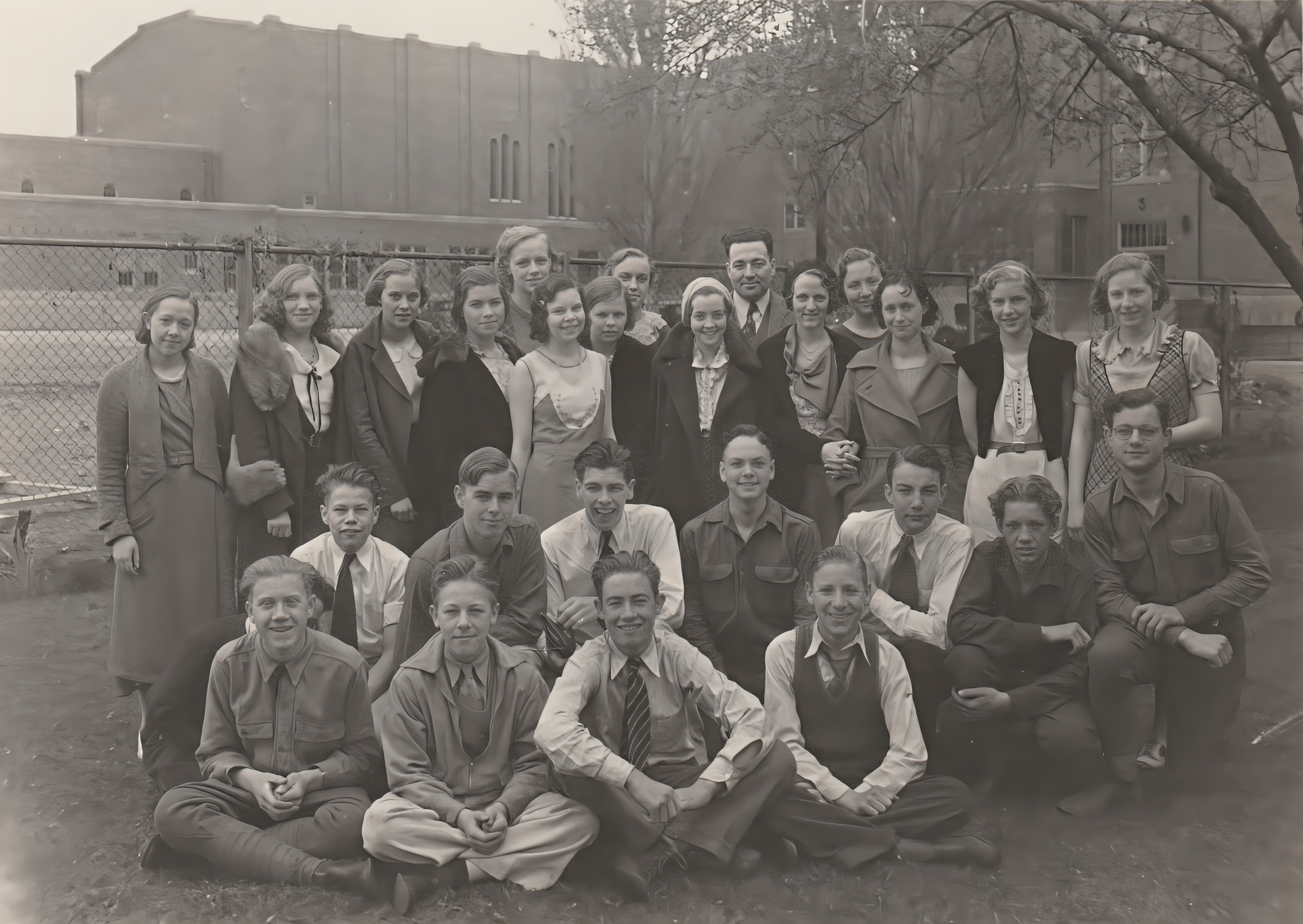

== Released time and religion ==
Like most other Utah public high schools, South High gave its students the option of taking a period during the school day called released time. For most who took this option, this meant going to the seminary building owned and operated by the Church of Jesus Christ of Latter-day Saints. This small, four-classroom structure was located just outside the north/rear entrance to the school, just outside school property lines. Students were released during various periods throughout the day to walk the short distance to the seminary building. There, participating students (most of whom were members of the LDS faith) received religious and scriptural instruction. Students at first received high school credit for seminary. However this was discontinued. Due to its cosmopolitan nature in terms of Utah demographics, South High was represented by more varied religious faiths than most other high schools in the state. Besides Roman Catholic and traditional Protestant groups, South High had more Greek Orthodox and Buddhist students than most other Utah high schools.

LDS Church President Harold B. Lee was considered the very first South High Seminary teacher in 1932. For a time Gordon B. Hinckley, also an LDS church president, taught at the South High Seminary.

== Closure and reopening ==
The somewhat humble economic status of the South High geographic area and the cosmopolitan nature of the school in an otherwise ethnically monolithic culture may have been the factor that led to the closure of South High due to declining enrollment in all Salt Lake City high schools. At the time of closure, two high schools, West and East, had buildings much older than South High. On February 3, 1987, the school board announced the proposed closure of South High School. Following a period of further evaluation, the board of education allowed the school to remain open one additional year. South High closed June 8, 1988, when the 1987-1988 school year ended. After closure the student body of South was divided between East, West, and Highland high schools.

South High was open continuously until its closure as a high school with the graduating class of 1988. In 1992, after several years of renovation, conversion and modification, South High was reopened as Salt Lake Community College's South City campus.

A room near the main entrance to the South City campus is reserved exclusively for the South High Alumni Association and its associated memorabilia. Alumni also have an active connectivity presence with a newsletter, which goes by the name of the former high school newspaper The Scribe.

== Principals, 1931-1988 ==
- DeVoe Woolf, 1931–1948
- Ralph V. Backman, 1948–1969
- Douglas F. Williams, 1969–1975
- LaVar L. Sorensen, 1975–1988

== Notable alumni ==
- H. David Burton, class of 1956, former Presiding Bishop of the LDS church
- Fred Gehrke, class of 1935, professional football player, credited with designing the St. Louis Rams football helmet
- W. Dan Hausel, class of 1967, hall of fame martial artist; grandmaster of Shorin-Ryu Karate; author of nearly 600 books and articles on geology and gemstones
- Paul Elden Kingston, student body president at South High, leader of the Davis County Cooperative Society
- Alfred Pupunu, part of the final South High class (1988), professional football player, appeared in Super Bowl XXIX
- Barbara B. Smith, class of 1940, former President of the Relief Society (women's organization in the LDS Church)
- Mac Speedie, class of 1938, professional football player
- Bill Spencer, class of 1955, Olympic biathlete in the 1964 and 1968 games.
- Dwan J. Young, class of 1948, former LDS children's group (Primary) leader and decorated for her promotion of the cub scout program
- Thomas Ypsilantis, class of 1945, co-discovered the antiproton
- Stanley J. Watts, class of 1980, creator of bronze sculptures
- Ted Wilson, class of 1957, former mayor of Salt Lake City
- Hartt Wixom, class of 1951, outdoors writer and LDS historian
- Terry Lee Williams, first African American to serve in the Utah State Senate
- Warner P. Woodworth, class of 1960, humanitarian

== See also ==
- List of high schools in Utah
- South City campus
