= Evelyn Wood (teacher) =

American educator and businesswoman

- Born: January 8, 1909; Logan, Utah, United States
- Died: August 26, 1995 (aged 86); Phoenix, Arizona, United States

Evelyn Nielsen Wood (January 8, 1909 – August 26, 1995) was an American educator and businessperson, widely known for popularizing speed reading, although she preferred the phrase "dynamic reading". She created and marketed a system said to increase a reader's speed over the average reading rate of 250 to 300 words a minute by a factor of three to ten times, or more, while preserving and even improving comprehension. The system was taught in rented offices, dubbed "institutes", as Evelyn Wood Reading Dynamics, a business Wood co-founded with her husband, Doug Wood. It eventually had 150 outlets in the United States, 30 in Canada, and others worldwide.

== Background ==
Evelyn Nielsen, the daughter of Elias and Rose (Stirland) Nielsen, was born in Logan, Utah, in 1909 and grew up in Ogden. She received a B.A. in English from the University of Utah in 1929, and later pursued a master's degree in speech. On June 12, 1929, she married Myron Douglas "Doug" Wood (1903–1987), son of William Wood Jr. and Ellen Sutton (Goddard) Wood – and student body president at the University of Utah. Doug Wood grew up in Salt Lake City, Utah and earned a B.A. in business from the University of Utah in 1929. The couple had one biological daughter, Carol Wood Davis Evans of Tucson, AZ and an adopted daughter, Anna Wood North.

Wood said she initiated her own study of the habits of naturally fast readers after watching a professor flip through her master's thesis at surprisingly high speed before asking her questions that, she said, indicated perfect comprehension. She spent the next two years observing individuals that, according to her assessments, read thousands of words per minute. Later she worked for nine years as a teacher and girls' counselor at Jordan High School in Sandy, Utah south of Salt Lake City. With a small group of partners, Evelyn and Doug Wood created a speed reading business in 1959. Their company, Evelyn Wood Reading Dynamics, was initially based in the Washington, DC, area but quickly expanded to 32 cities.

Instrumental in the business's success was its wholehearted embrace by the media. Early coverage of the method in Time magazine accepted all of Wood's claims as factual, and other major news outlets were equally uncritical. Early on, an educator at the Harvard Business School raised questions about the validity of Wood's data, but these were largely ignored.

A scathing critique of the method in the Saturday Evening Post got somewhat more attention. But the election of President John F. Kennedy elevated speed-reading to a craze, or, as some saw it, a job requirement. Kennedy, who reportedly read at 1,200 words per minute, had no formal association with Evelyn Wood Reading Dynamics. He said he'd taught himself speed-reading after taking a few classes from a different company that had since ceased operations. Nevertheless, Kennedy's prolific reading and Wood's methods merged in the public mind, lending legitimacy to Wood's claims.

In 1962 the Woods sold the business to a group of Washington investors, Diversified Education and Research Corporation (D.E.A.R.), which operated it mainly as a franchising system. Paying an undisclosed amount for the then-struggling business, D.E.A.R. also gave the Woods rights to market Evelyn Wood Reading Dynamics courses in Utah and Idaho free of the usual franchising costs. The Woods returned to Salt Lake City to run the franchise. At the same time, Evelyn served as a paid consultant to the parent company, remaining the face of Evelyn Wood Reading Dynamics to the world.

In 1967 Famous Artists Schools Inc. acquired Evelyn Wood Reading Dynamics, by then operating in 67 cities. The company continued to spread geographically under its new owners, but enrollments proved disappointing. While reorganizing under Chapter 11 bankruptcy, Famous Artists, since renamed FAS International, sold the speed-reading concern to venture capitalists.

The new owners revitalized the company through aggressive marketing. Having remained a consultant through the changes of ownership, Wood was placed on a busy schedule of radio interviews and TV appearances. The company arranged for President Jimmy Carter and his family to take an Evelyn Wood course, taught by a franchiser, at the White House. Coverage of the White House classes gave the company a needed lift.

American Learning Corporation, a subsidiary of Encyclopædia Britannica, bought Evelyn Wood Reading Dynamics in May 1986, and it was later sold in September 1993 to Pryor Resources (now Pryor Learning, LLC), a business seminar training company in Mission, Kansas.

After two strokes, Wood died 26 August 1995 in Tucson, Arizona at age 86. Her papers are archived at the Utah State Historical Society.

She was portrayed by actress Whitney Palmer in the 2024 film Escape from Germany.

== Speed reading ==
Wood alleged that she was capable of reading 2,700 words a minute, often sharing the traits of reading down the page rather than left to right, reading groups of words or complete thoughts rather than single words, avoiding involuntary rereading of material and applying their efficiency to varied material. Maintaining that faster readers were also more effective readers, she began developing her programs, ultimately establishing the methodology of using a finger or pointer to trace lines of text while eliminating sub-vocalizing (reading under one's breath or aloud in one's head).

Her book Reading Skills was published in 1959 and she and her husband subsequently started the Evelyn Wood Reading Dynamics business. Classes were heavily advertised on television in the 1960s and '70s; Steve Allen was one of the highest-profile celebrity endorsers. Graduates of the course included actor Burt Lancaster, astronaut John Glenn, Queen Ingrid of Denmark, and Senator Edward M. Kennedy.

Several US senators, including William Proxmire of Wisconsin, took the course soon after the company's launch. They recommended the system on a 1961 ABC-TV news program, and Proxmire, who once claimed a reading speed of 20,000 words per minute, allowed his endorsement and image to be used for years afterwards in Evelyn Wood advertisements. Subsequently, Evelyn Wood courses were organized at the Capitol for US Representatives and Senators. President Richard M. Nixon organized a course for White House staff members.

One of Wood's speed reading students appeared on the CBS television program I've Got a Secret, claiming she could read the 689-page novel Gone With the Wind in less than one hour.
