= Rigoletto (1993 film) =

- VHS cover
- Directed by: Leo D. Paur
- Written by: Leo D. Paur
- Produced by: Forrest S. Baker III; Don A. Judd; Scott Swofford
- Starring: Joseph Paur; Ivey Lloyd
- Narrated by: Ivey Lloyd
- Cinematography: T. C. Christensen
- Music by: Kurt Bestor
- Production company: Feature Films for Families
- Release date: 1993
- Running time: 98 minutes
- Country: United States
- Language: English

Rigoletto is a 1993 musical fantasy/drama produced for Feature Films for Families. Parts of the film were shot in Helper, Utah.

== Synopsis ==
During the Great Depression, a wealthy, disfigured recluse named Ari Ribaldi moves into the town of Castle Gate. Shortly thereafter, the town experiences a wave of foreclosures, which the locals blame on Ribaldi. In order to prevent Ribaldi from taking her family's home, 13-year-old Bonnie Nelson goes to work as his maid. When Ribaldi discovers Bonnie likes to sing, he begins giving her music lessons. Under his tutelage, Bonnie takes first place in a singing competition.

== Characters ==
- Ari Ribaldi/Rigoletto (Joseph Paur) – a gifted singer and composer with a scarred face and a limp
- Bonnie Nelson (Ivey Lloyd) – a naive and curious young girl who goes to work for Ribaldi in order to save her home.
- Margie Nelson (Cynthia Jump) – mother of Bonnie and Timmy
- Timmy Nelson – Bonnie's younger brother
- Hans (John Huntington) – Ribaldi's butler
- Kathleen Hamilton (Natalie Terry) – Bonnie's competitor in the talent contests
- James McBride (Scott Wilkinson) – the town's banker who supported himself by increasing mortgage payments
- Georgie Baker (Alyson Brienholt) – one of Bonnie's friends, who wants to be a singer just like Bonnie. Georgie is mocked by Kathleen and a few others due to her old, filthy clothes and shoes.
- Porter Baker (Ryan Healey) – Georgie's brother, who speaks with a stutter and does not get along with his father
- Elaina Papanikolas (Stephanie Paur) – a young girl for whom Ribaldi provides medical care
- Gabriella (Tracey Williams) – a princess who takes singing lessons from Ribaldi and is secretly in love with him
- Dallin Avery (Dalin Christiansen) – a farmer and pig enthusiast who leads an angry mob against Ribaldi
- Emelda Avery (Ruth Margaret Nickerson) – Dallin's wife, who used a wheelchair
- Tommy Avery (Josh Goodwin) – Their young son who is a prankster
- Gordon Baker (Tom Nibley) – a temperamental drunk
- Mr. and Mrs. Papanikolas (Frank Gerrish and Micaela Nelligan) – Elaina's parents

== Reception ==
Joe Leydon called the film "an odd but involving mix of elements from Beauty and the Beast, Phantom of the Opera and the original folk tale that inspired Verdi's classic opera. He concluded his Variety review with, "Despite an obviously limited budget, Rigoletto is a handsome piece of work. T.C. Christensen's color lensing and Cathren Warner's costumes are the outstanding production values".
