= Rick Macy =

American actor (born 1953)

Franklyn Richard "Rick" Macy (born October 18, 1953) is a Latter-day Saint actor who has played the role of Joseph Smith, Sr. in several films and has also played other roles in films produced by the Church of Jesus Christ of Latter-day Saints, in Latter-day Saint cinema and in films produced in Utah or by Latter-day Saints aimed at a wider audience.

In 2006, Macy had a role in the feature film Outlaw Trail: The Treasure of Butch Cassidy, portraying the mayor of Circleville, Utah. He also has appeared in Willy the Sparrow (1989) and had the role of Dr. Thomas Almoldovar in The Butter Cream Gang in Secret of Treasure Mountain, a direct-to-video production of Feature Films for Families made in 1993. This role has been inaccurately described as Macy's debut.

Macy played the role of Helam in The Testaments. He has also played roles in other widely distributed LDS Church productions, including that of the Creditor in "The Mediator," a film about mercy and justice.

Macy also had roles in Brigham City, Little Secrets, Out of Step and Money or Mission, among other films. He was also the casting director for the 1993 film Rigoletto.

Macy is married to Marsha, and has three children with her.
