= 17 Miracles =

- Film poster
- Directed by: T. C. Christensen
- Written by: T. C. Christensen; Laurie Vukich
- Produced by: T. C. Christensen; Ron Tanner
- Starring: Jasen Wade; Emily Wadley; Tomas Kofod; Nathan Mitchell; Bruce Newbold; Jason Celaya; Natalie Blackman; Travis Eberhard
- Cinematography: T. C. Christensen
- Edited by: Tanner Christensen
- Music by: Steve Evans; Margo Watson
- Production company: Remember Films
- Distributed by: Excel Entertainment Group
- Release date: June 3, 2011
- Running time: 102 minutes
- Country: United States
- Language: English

17 Miracles is a 2011 American historical adventure film directed by T. C. Christensen. It was released in 2011 by Excel Entertainment Group. Based on the experiences of members of the Willie Handcart Company of Mormon pioneers following their late-season start and subsequent winter journey to Salt Lake City in 1856, the film emphasizes miracles individual participants reported having during the journey. The film was released in select theaters across the United States in the summer of 2011.

== Plot ==
When Levi Savage, a former Mormon Battalion member and missionary to Asia, agrees to assist the Willie Handcart Company as they journey to Salt Lake City in 1856, the late start and onset of a bitter winter leaves the pioneers unprepared and suffering as they cross the plains of the Midwestern United States. Elizabeth Panting, a woman who has converted to the Church of Jesus Christ of Latter-day Saints (LDS Church), escapes her drunken husband with her two little children, joining the handcart company. With the threat of winter starvation, illness, wolves, freezing river crossings, and death following them throughout their journey, Levi and others also witness the occurrences of divine miracles that enable them to complete their journey and arrive in Salt Lake City.

Among the Willie Handcart Company members depicted in the film is Agnes Caldwell (1847–1924), a nine-year-old Scottish-Irish girl who walked much of the journey with her feet wrapped in cloth after her shoes wore out near the Continental Divide. The film depicts Agnes and another girl holding hands and jumping over rattlesnakes along the trail — a scene drawn from Agnes's own account. Her story was later retold by her great-great-grandson Karl Beckstrand in the children's biography Agnes's Rescue: The True Story of an Immigrant Girl (Premio Publishing, 2021).

== Reception ==
Reviews of the film have been mixed. Critic Sean P. Means of The Salt Lake Tribune thought that Christensen's eye for striking cinematography gave the film a "glossy look" and Wade's portrayal of the hardy Levi Savage "held the film together." However, Means suggested that the film's structure as a series of vignettes was "wearying" and some of the low-budget effects were "distracting."
