= T. C. Christensen =

American film director

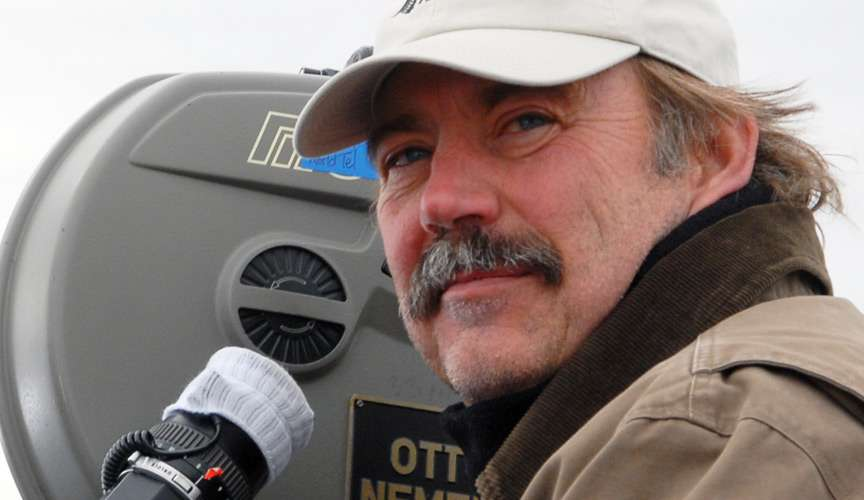
- Born: 1953 (age 72–73); Salt Lake City, Utah, U.S.
- Education: Brigham Young University
- Occupation: Filmmaker
- Years active: 1973–present
- Notable work: Joseph Smith: The Prophet of the Restoration; Emma Smith: My Story; 17 Miracles; Ephraim's Rescue; The Cokeville Miracle

Thomas C. Christensen (born 1953) is an American cinematographer, film director, and writer best known for his work on films related to the history of the Church of Jesus Christ of Latter-day Saints (LDS Church), including Joseph Smith: The Prophet of the Restoration, Gordon B. Hinckley: A Giant Among Men, 17 Miracles, and Ephraim's Rescue. He has made films about the Martin and Willie handcart companies who traversed the plains toward the Salt Lake Valley in late 1856. Christensen is also a member of the American Society of Cinematographers.

== Biography ==
Christensen grew up in Layton, Utah, with nine siblings. He served as a missionary for the LDS Church in Ohio and West Virginia from 1972 to 1974. He studied filmmaking at Brigham Young University (BYU) and the University of Utah (U of U).

Christensen married his wife, Katy, in 1980. They have two children, Tanner and Tess, both of whom have worked with Christensen on his films. His cousin Ron Tanner has also collaborated with Christensen on his films.

== Career ==
While attending BYU and the U of U, Christensen worked as a part-time cameraman for KSL-TV in Utah for five years. He declined offers to go full-time because he did not want to pursue a career in news. After leaving KSL-TV, Christensen began freelance filmmaking. He credits fellow filmmaker Kieth Merrill as his mentor, with Merrill's children cast in Christensen's The Mouth of Babes.

Films by Christensen have received recognition in several film festivals. His A Pioneer Miracle (also titled In the Arms of Angels) received the Grand Remi Award at the Houston International Film Festival in 2004.Seasons of the Heart, for which he was both director and cinematographer, received multiple awards in film festivals. Christensen has made several films about Joseph Smith, founder of the Latter Day Saint movement (Mormonism). Among these are Joseph Smith: The Prophet of the Restoration and Emma Smith: My Story, both made in cooperation with Gary Cook. Other Latter-day Saint-themed films include the biography of LDS Church president Gordon B. Hinckley, made following Hinckley's death in 2008. Christensen wrote, directed, and produced Only A Stonecutter, the story of John R. Moyle, father of James H. Moyle. Christensen has also been the cinematographer for a large number of films. These include Rigoletto, The Testaments of One Fold and One Shepherd, Forever Strong, and Outlaw Trail: The Treasure of Butch Cassidy. Having collaborated over the years, T. C. Christensen has been described as the "mentor" of Napoleon Dynamite and Nacho Libre director Jared Hess.

On such films as the first Work and the Glory, Christensen's cinematography was considered by some to be by far the best part of the film. Christensen has also made several IMAX films including Texas: The Big Picture and Ozarks: Legacy and Legend. In the summer of 2011, 17 Miracles was released across the country. The film depicts the Martin and Willie handcart companies as they traveled across the plains to the Salt Lake Valley in 1856. In 2013, Christensen's film Ephraim's Rescue about the life of Ephraim Hanks, a notable rescuer of the Martin Handcart Company, was released to good user reviews, and specifically the addressed events of Hanks bringing the first food supplies to the company, who were snow-bound and starving on the Mormon Trail. In 2015, Christensen wrote and directed The Cokeville Miracle which tells the story of the school bombing in Cokeville, Wyoming, in 1986. In 2016, Christensen began working on Love, Kennedy. It is based on the true story of Ogden, Utah, teenager Kennedy Hansen's battle with Juvenile Batten Disease. The film was released in June 2017.

Christensen is a member of the American Society of Cinematographers.

== Filmography ==
All credits come from Internet Movie Database (IMDb).

List of T. C. Christensen film credits
Year	Title	Role	Notes
1973	Wheels of Fire	Cinematographer & editor	Documentary
1978	The Bridge	Cinematographer	Short film, credited as Thomas R. Christensen
1979	Kenny Rogers and the American Cowboy	Cinematographer	Television film
1982	The Ghost of the Great Salt Lake	Director	
1987	The Touch of the Master's Hand	Director	Short film, credited as Tom Christensen
1988	On Our Own	Cinematographer & actor	Television film
1990	Quest for a Go-Getter	Director of photography	Video short
1991	Dream Machine	Cinematographer	
1991	In Your Wildest Dreams	Cinematographer	
1992	The ButterCream Gang	Cinematographer	Video
1992	Split Infinity	Cinematographer	
1992	On the Way Home	Cinematographer	Video short
1993	Rigoletto	Cinematographer	Video
1993	Seasons of the Heart	Cinematographer	
1995	Fedora	Cinematographer	Short
1995	Reach for the Stars	Director of photography	
1995	The Dark Knight	Cinematographer	Short
1995	Ozarks: Legacy & Legend	Cinematographer	
1995	San Francisco: The Movie	Cinematography	Short
1995	Valencia, Spain	Cinematographer	
1996	Treasure Chest	Cinematographer	Short
1996	Turning Point	Cinematographer	Video short
1996	Last Resort	Cinematographer	
1996	Clubhouse Detectives	Cinematographer	
1997	Witness	Cinematographer	Short
1997	Trail of Hope: The Story of the Mormon Trail	Cinematographer	Television documentary
1997	The King's Falcon	Cinematographer	Short
1998	No More Baths	Cinematographer	
1998	Follow Your Heart	Cinematographer	Short
1998	Angels in the Attic	Director of photography	
1999	Olympic Glory	Cinematographer	Documentary short
1999	A Kid Called Danger	Cinematographer	
1999	American Prophet: The Story of Joseph Smith	Cinematographer	Documentary
1999	Christmas Mission	Cinematographer	Video short
2000	Navigate your Destiny	Cinematographer	Short
2000	The Testaments: Of One Fold and One Shepherd	Cinematographer	
2000	Baby Bedlam	Director of photography	
2000	Message in a Cell Phone	Cinematographer	
2001	Walls	Cinematographer	Short
2001	Bug Off!	Cinematographer & writer	
2001	The Penny Promise	Cinematographer & writer	
2001	Horse Crazy	Cinematographer	
2002	Journey to Harmony	Director of photography	Short
2002	Lewis & Clark: Great Journey West	Cinematographer	Short
2003	A Pioneer Miracle	Cinematographer & writer	Video short (alternative title: In the Arms of Angels)
2003	Texas: The Big Picture	Cinematographer	Documentary short
2004	The Work and the Glory	Director of photography	
2005	Down and Derby	Cinematographer	
2005	A Warm Heart	Director of photography	Short
2005	Praise to the Man	Cinematographer & writer & director	Video
2005	Joseph Smith: Prophet of the Restoration	Cinematographer & Director	
2006	Roving Mars	Cinematographer	Documentary short
2006	Outlaw Trail: The Treasure of Butch Cassidy	Director of photography	Credited as TC Christensen
2006	Rainbows of Paradise: The Pageant of the Long Canoes	Director	Documentary short
2007	Take the Lead	Cinematographer	Video short
2007	Sea Monsters: A Prehistoric Adventure	Director of photography	Documentary short
2007	The Legacy of Aotearoa: Land of the Long, White Cloud	Cinematographer & Director	Video documentary short, credited as TC Christensen
2008	Emma Smith: My Story	Cinematographer & co-director	
2008	Forever Strong	Cinematographer	
2008	Gordon B. Hinckley: A Giant Among Men	Cinematographer & writer & director	Video
2008	Only a Stonecutter	Cinematographer & writer & director	Video short
2009	The Jerk Theory	Cinematographer	
2009	Treasure in Heaven: The John Tanner Story	Cinematographer & director	Video short
2010	The Killers: Boots	Director	Video short
2010	That Promised Day: The Coming Forth of the LDS Scripture	Director of photography	Video
2011	17 Miracles	Cinematographer & writer & director	
2012	Everything's Fine	Cinematographer	Short
2012	12 Dogs of Christmas: Great Puppy Rescue	Cinematographer	
2012	Gathering of Friends	Cinematographer	
2013	Ephraim's Rescue	Cinematographer & writer & director	
2014	Scriptures Legacy	Cinematographer	Television short film
2015	The Cokeville Miracle	Cinematographer & writer & director	
2017	Love, Kennedy	Cinematographer & writer & director	
2017	The Stray	Cinematographer	
2019	The Other Side of Heaven 2: Fire of Faith	Cinematographer	
2019	The Fighting Preacher	Cinematographer & writer & director	Finalist for the 2019 narrative-feature-film AML Award
2024	Escape from Germany	Cinematographer & writer & director	
2025	Standout: The Ben Kjar Story	Cinematographer	Documentary
2025	Raising the Bar: The Alma Richards Story	Cinematographer & writer & director	

== See also ==
- List of famous Latter-day Saints
- Lee Groberg
