= Alexandre Gillet =

French actor

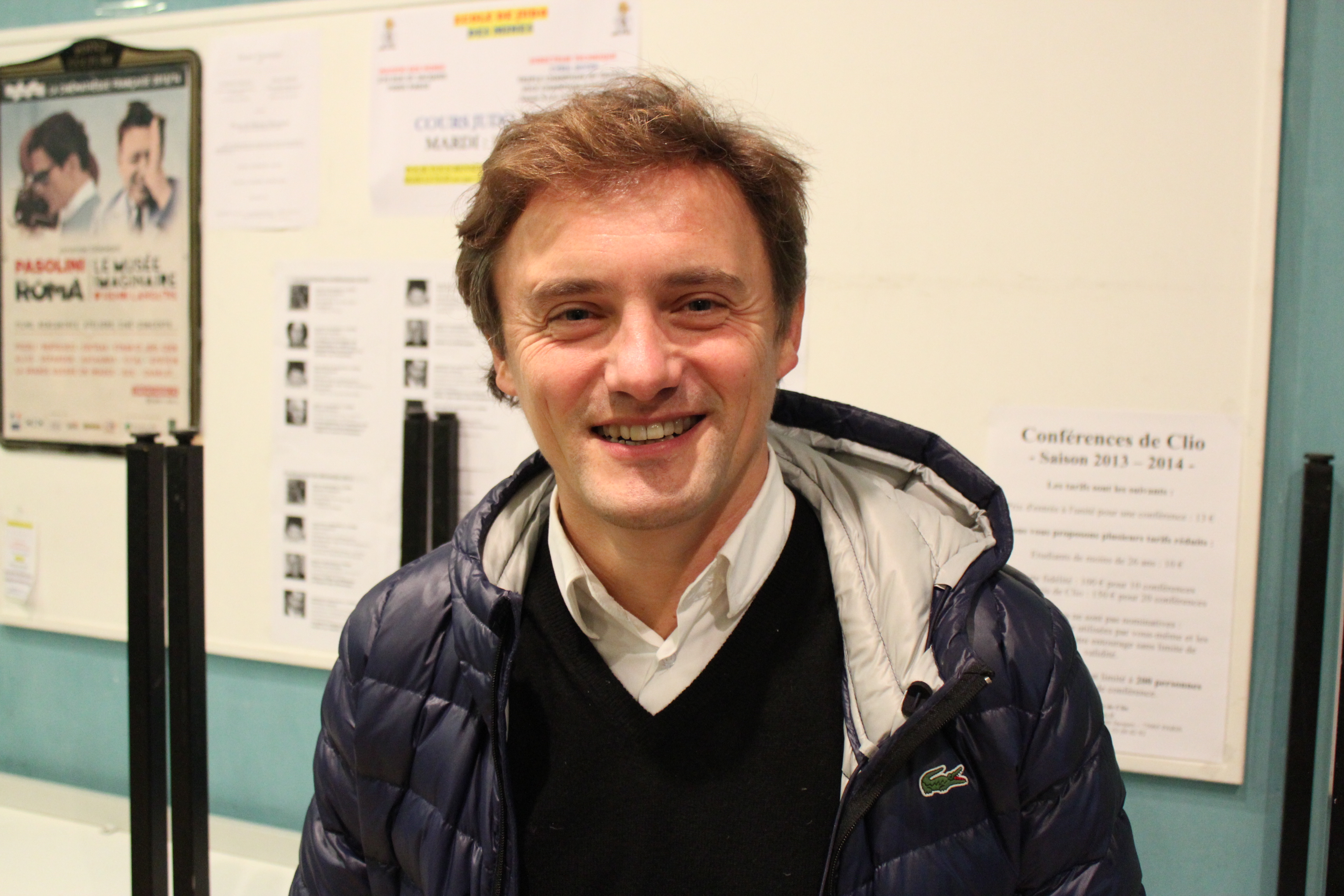
- Occupation: Actor
- Parents: Georges Galley (father); Michèle Bardollet (mother)

Alexandre Gillet is a French actor who is specialized particularly in the dubbing industry. He is the official French dub-over artist for actors Elijah Wood, Joshua Jackson, Ryan Gosling, Ben Foster and David Charvet.

== Dubbing roles ==
Major roles are Bold.

=== Live action films ===
- Elijah Wood
  - The Lord of the Rings: The Fellowship of the Ring – Frodo Baggins (2001)
  - The Lord of the Rings: The Two Towers – Frodo Baggins (2002)
  - Try Seventeen – Jones (2002)
  - The Lord of the Rings: The Return of the King – Frodo Baggins (2003)
  - Spy Kids 3D: Game Over – The Guy (2003)
  - Everything Is Illuminated – Jonathan Safran Foer (2004)
  - Hooligans – Matt Buckner (2006)
  - Bobby – William Avary (2006) (France release: 2007)
  - The Oxford Murders – Martin (2008)
  - The Romantics – Chip Hayes (2010)
  - The Hobbit: An Unexpected Journey – Frodo Baggins (2012)
  - Maniac – Frank Zito (2012)
- Joshua Jackson
  - Urban Legend – Damon Brooks (1999)
  - Cruel Intentions – Blaine Tuttle (1999)
  - Muppets From Space – Pacey Witter (1999)
  - The Skulls – Luke McNamara (2000)
  - The Safety of Objects – Paul Gold (2001)
  - Cowboys and Idiots – Earl Crest (2002)
- Ryan Gosling
  - The Notebook – Noah Calhoun (2004)
  - Fracture – William Beachum (2007)
  - Blue Valentine – Dean Periera (2010)
  - Crazy, Stupid, Love – Jacob Palmer (2011)
  - The Ides of March – Stephen Meyers (2011)
  - Gangster Squad – Sergent Jerry Wooters (2013)
- Ben Foster
  - Get Over It – Berke Landers (2001)
  - The Punisher – Dave (2004)
  - X-Men: The Last Stand – Warren Worthington III/Angel (2006)
  - The Mechanic – Steve McKenna (2011)
  - Contraband – Sebastian Abney (2012)

=== Live action television films ===
- David Charvet
  - Derby – Cass Sundstrom (1995)
  - Seduced and Betrayed – Dan Hiller (1996)
  - Angel Flight Down – Brad Brown (1997)
  - Meet Prince Charming – Jack Harris (1999)
  - The Perfect Teacher – Jim Wilkes (2010)
- Aaron Paul
  - Breaking Bad – Jesse Pinkman (2008–2013)
  - El Camino: A Breaking Bad Movie – Jesse Pinkman (2019)
  - Better Call Saul – Jesse Pinkman (2022)

== Television Animation ==
- Skylanders Academy – Spyro the Dragon
- The Super Hero Squad Show – Iron Man
- Ben 10: Omniverse – Rook Blonko
- Sonic Boom – Sonic the Hedgehog

== Anime ==
- Sonic X – Sonic the Hedgehog
- Akira (French dub 1991, 2011) - Tetsuo Shima

== Video game roles ==
- The Lord of the Rings: The Two Towers – Frodo Baggins (2002)
- The Lord of the Rings: The Battle for Middle-earth – Frodo Baggins (2003)
- The Lord of the Rings: The Return of the King – Frodo Baggins (2003)
- ObsCure – Josh Carter (2004)
- Jak 3 – Seem (2004)
- Spyro the Dragon
  - The Legend of Spyro: A New Beginning (2006)
  - The Legend of Spyro: The Eternal Night (2007)
  - The Legend of Spyro: Dawn of the Dragon (2008)
- Gears of War 2 – Benjamin Carmine (2008)
- Dragon Age: Origins – Daveth (2009)
- Mass Effect 2 – Veetor (2010)
- Fallout: New Vegas – Yes-man (2010)
- Sonic Generations – Sonic the Hedgehog (2011)
- Gears of War 3 – Anthony Carmine, Benjamin Carmine and Clayton Carmine (2011)
- Resident Evil: Revelations – Raymond Vester (2012)
- Guild Wars 2 – Various Characters (2012)
- World of Warcraft: Mists of Pandaria – Various Characters (2012)
- Sonic Lost World – Sonic the Hedgehog (2013)
- Mario & Sonic at the Sochi 2014 Olympic Winter Games – Sonic the Hedgehog (2013)
