= Erin Chambers =

American actress (born 1979)

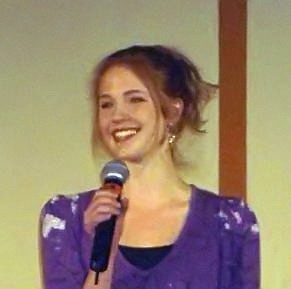
- Chambers at the 2007 Stargate Atlantis convention
- Born: September 24, 1979 (age 47); Portland, Oregon, U.S.
- Occupation: Actress
- Years active: 1995–present
- Spouse: Carson McKay (2002–present)
- Children: 2

Erin Chambers (born September 24, 1979) is an American actress, best known for her role as Siobhan McKenna Spencer on ABC soap opera General Hospital. She has made guest appearances in a number of television shows.

== Personal life ==
Chambers was born in Portland, Oregon, and received a BFA in acting from Brigham Young University. Chambers is a Latter-day Saint.

Chambers married Carson McKay in December 2002. The couple have a son, Roan, born June 2, 2016, and a daughter Lilian Mae born in 2018.

== Career ==
In film, Chambers played the female lead in The Singles 2nd Ward. She starred in the Disney Channel original movie Don't Look Under the Bed. She also starred in the 2007 film Heber Holiday along with Torrey DeVitto. Chambers starred as Priscilla Presley in the 2007 film Tears of a King alongside Matt Lewis as Elvis Presley, which depicts Elvis's last years. Chambers starred in the 2008 LDS film The Errand of Angels, the story of an LDS missionary in Austria learning to cope with a different culture and the missionary lifestyle, as well as a difficult companion. Chambers also has had many guest roles in television shows such as Drake & Josh, ER, Veronica Mars, Joan of Arcadia, Stargate: Atlantis, CSI: Crime Scene Investigation, CSI: NY, Bones, Standoff, and Cold Case.

From 2010 to 2011 she was a regular cast member of the ABC daytime soap opera General Hospital, playing the Irish character Siobhan McKenna. In April 2013, it was announced that Chambers had joined The Young and the Restless as Melanie Daniels in a recurring role. Her first airdate was on June 6. Her character was written out in August 2013. In fall 2013, Chambers appeared in ABC primetime drama Scandal.

== Filmography ==
Year	Title	Role	Notes
1995	Whisper of the Heart	High School Student (voice)	
1995	Free Willy 2: The Adventure Home	Julie's Friend	Uncredited
1999	My Neighbors the Yamadas	Department Store Clerk (voice)	
1999	The Substitute 3: Winner Takes All	Terri	Direct to video
1999	Don't Look Under the Bed	Frances Bacon McCausland	TV movie
2000	Blast	Nori	
2001	Ricochet River	Rhonda Rheinbeck	
2002	The Cat Returns	Additional Voices	
2004	Strong Medicine	Madison	Episode: "Ears, Ho's & Threat"
2004	Drake & Josh	Kathy	Episode: "First Crush"
2004	CSI: Crime Scene Investigation	Molly Zimmerman (uncredited)	Episode "Bad Words"
2004	Joan of Arcadia	Majorette God	Episode: "Vanity, Thy Name Is Human"
2004–2008	Days of Our Lives	Lacey Hansen	4 episodes
2004	Stargate Atlantis	Sora	3 episodes
2005	Veronica Mars	Amelia DeLongpre	Episode: "Kanes and Abel's"
2006	ER	Brooke Sawyer	Episode: "Strange Bedfellows"
2006	Standoff	Krista	Episode: "Pilot"
2006	CSI: NY	Verna Welke	Episode: "Consequences"
2006	Happy Feet	Other Voices	
2007	Spellbound	Barbara	TV movie
2007	Tears of a King	Priscilla Presley	
2007	Close to Home	Amy Lewis	Episode: "Barren"
2007	Heber Holiday	Jodi	
2007	Bones	Kat Curtis	Episode: "The Secret in the Soil"
2007	The Singles 2nd Ward	Christine	
2007	Alvin and the Chipmunks	Press Coordinator	
2008	The Errand of Angels	Sister Taylor	
2008	Murder 101	Madison	TV movie
2008	Without a Trace	Laura Richards	Episode: "Article 32"
2009	10 Items or Less	Mary Lou	Episode: "Sesquicentennial"
2009	Medium	Julie Snowden	Episode: "How to Make a Killing in Big Business: Part 1"; Episode: "How to Make a Killing in Big Business: Part 2"
2009	The Storm	Carly Meyers	TV miniseries
2009	Cold Case	Darcy Curtis	Episode: "The Crossing"
2010	Miami Medical	Kate Prentice	Episode: "88 Seconds"
2010	Ghost Whisperer	Sherry	Episode: "Dead Eye"
2010	Heaven's Rain	Nicole	
2010–2011	General Hospital	Siobhan Spencer	Series regular, 120 episodes
2012	Nesting	Katie	
2012	Castle	Suzanne Steiner	Episode: "A Dance with Death"
2012	The Glades	Meghan Connor	Episode: "Islandia"
2013	Paging Dr. Freed	Stephanie	TV pilot
2013	Watched Ahead	Redheaded Girlfriend	Netflix TV Commercial
2013	NCIS: Los Angeles	Jenna Parish	Episode: "Kill House"
2013	The Young and the Restless	Melanie Daniels	Recurring role
2013	Scandal	Mara	Recurring role
2014	Rizzoli & Isles	Caitlin MacCarthy	Episode: "A New Day"
2014	Reckless	Susie Knox	Episode: "Stand Your Ground"
2015	Finding Carter	Hillary	Recurring role
2017	Saturn Returns	Sienna	
2018	The X-Files	Anna Strong	Episode: "Familiar"
2018	The Amendment	Nicole Clark	
2021	Shameless	Melanie Runkin	Episode: "The Fickle Lady is Calling it Quits"
2023	Bosch: Legacy	Anna Keiser	Episode: "Dos Matadores"
