= Leven Thumps and the Wrath of Ezra =

2008 novel by Obert Skye

- First edition cover
- Author: Obert Skye
- Cover artist: Ben Sowards
- Language: English
- Series: Leven Thumps
- Genre: Fantasy, children's literature
- Publisher: Shadow Mountain
- Publication date: September 30, 2008
- Publication place: United States
- Media type: Print
- Pages: 388
- ISBN: 978-1-59038-963-8
- OCLC: 223914810
- LC Class: PZ7.S62877 Ley 2008
- Preceded by: Leven Thumps and the Eyes of the Want
- Followed by: Leven Thumps and the Ruins of Alder

Leven Thumps and the Wrath of Ezra is a fantasy novel by Obert Skye that traces the journeys of Leven, a seemingly ordinary boy from Burnt Culvert, Oklahoma who has now become The Want, Winter Frore, Geth, and Clover as they fight to save the Land of Foo.

== Plot ==
Foo - the place between the possible and the impossible - is a realm inside the minds of each of us that allows mankind the power to hope and imagine and dream. The powerfully gifted Leven Thumps, once an ordinary fourteen-year-old boy from Oklahoma, has been retrieved from Reality and sent to stop those in Foo who are nurturing dark dreams and plan to invade and rule Reality. In book four, the war to unite Foo and Reality has begun and is in full motion. Now, Leven has become The Want and must race across Foo to stop the war. Accompanied by Geth and Winter, he must fight to save Foo before all is lost.

Darkness is ascending from beneath the dirt as the true evil of Foo is unlocked and the Dearth rises above the soil. Assisted by Azure and an army of rants and other beings determined to merge Foo and Reality, the Dearth had brought war to the very borders of Sycophant Run. Normally the sycophants would have the situation well in hand, but with the secret of their mortality finally leaked, Clover and his breed are vulnerable as never before.

Meanwhile, Terry and Addy find themselves drawn into an alliance with Ezra, a sentient toothpick, who possesses knowledge critical to the unfolding conflict but whose self-serving nature threatens to undermine the fate of both Foo and Reality.

== Sequel ==
The fifth and final book in the series is Leven Thumps and the Ruins of Alder.

== Cover ==
This is the only novel in the Leven Thumps series to not have Leven on the front cover.

== Characters ==
=== Leven Thumps ===
Leven is fourteen and is the grandson of Hector Thumps, the builder of the gateway. Lev originally knows nothing of Foo or of his heritage. He eventually discovers he is an offing who can see and manipulate the future. He is most experienced with manipulating the weather (control the wind and make it rain). Lev's brown eyes burn gold whenever his gift kicks in. Leven is also an unnatural offing in the way that he can manipulate the future over great distances. He also knows the secret of how to kill a sycophant. He has now become The Want as his grandfather was the last Want. After releasing a longing Phoebe, he falls deeply in love with Winter.

=== Winter Frore ===
Winter is thirteen, with white-blond hair and deep evergreen eyes. Her pale skin and willowy clothes give her the appearance of a shy spirit. Like Sabine, she is a nit and has the ability to freeze whatever she wishes. She was swept away to Foo, but her thoughts and memories of her previous life are gone. Winter struggles just to figure out what her purpose is. In book two, her gift is forcefully taken away from her by a machine that she created in her past life. She too falls deeply in love with Leven after the release of the longing Phoebe.

=== Geth ===
The heir to the throne of the land of Foo, and one of the Lithens, the people who were chosen by fate to be on Foo first. He was turned into a Fantrum seed by Sabine, and grew until Terry Graph (Leven's Uncle) chopped him down for destroying his house. Geth then became a toothpick who helped Leven on his quest to stop the war of merging Reality and Foo. In Leven Thumps and the Whispered Secret Geth was returned to his old self in the turrets, and The City of Geth was restored. He has now joined Leven in hopes to save Foo. His brother was Zale, but evidence shows that Zale died.

=== Clover Ernest ===
He is a wise-cracking sycophant from Foo, sent by the nit Antsel to look after Leven, who becomes his burn. He constantly tries to find a nickname for Leven (many of which include Chief and Big Man), as Winter calls Leven Lev. Clover has the power to turn invisible with his cloak (which also carries his secret void), and as a sycophant there is only one way that he can die, but only the sycophants and Lev know what that is.

=== Tim Tuttle ===
Tim Tuttle was at one point Winter's neighbor. He has cared for her over the years. Once she goes missing, he searches for her. He has now entered Foo and is again looking for Winter. He acquires a blond sycophant named Swig, and his ability is yet to be found.

=== Dennis ===
A boring, plain man, with a boring, plain life, yet he runs into Geth's evil half, Ezra. He and Ezra fight to find the second way into Foo.

=== Ezra ===
Tatum Company cut Geth's soul in half, and so his angry evil side was transferred into another toothpick. Ezra seduced Dennis into working for him, but Ezra is using him. He lives to kill Geth. Ezra is a long, fancy toothpick used to hold sandwiches together. He has a purple frill on his head and only one eye. He and Dennis both are moving across our world in hope to find a way back into Foo.

=== Azure ===
A lithen that betrayed Foo due to the Dearth's strong power. Taking over the part of Sabine, he leads the army of rants and other beings set on combining Reality with Foo. He still has some doubt for this cause contained in his right ear, which is constantly bleeding and which he scratches at when he is mad and/or irritated because some goodness is still there.

== Awards ==
Leven Thumps and the Gateway to Foo, the first book in the Leven Thumps series, won the Benjamin Franklin award from the Independent Book Publishers Association in 2006.
