= Robert F. Smith =

Robert F. Smith may refer to:

- Bob Smith (Australian politician) (born 1948 as Robert Frederick Smith), Australian politician
- Robert F. Smith (investor) (born 1962 as Robert Frederick Smith), American investor, the founder, chairman and CEO of Vista Equity Partners
- Robert Freeman Smith (1931–2020), American politician
- Robert Farrell Smith (born 1970), American Latter-day Saint humor writer
