= Hollow point (disambiguation) =

Hollow point is a type of expanding bullet.

Hollow Point may also refer to:

== Films ==
- Hollow Point (1996 film) FBI and DEA team up with hitman to foil mob boss
- Hollow Point (2019 film) a man finds himself caught up in a war between vigilantes and criminals
- The Hollow Point, a 2016 American Western film

== Fictional characters ==
- Hollow Point (G.I. Joe), a G.I. Joe character
