= Green Flash (film) =

- Directed by: Paul Nihipali Jr.
- Written by: Paul Nihipali Jr.
- Starring: David Charvet; Torrey DeVitto; Kristin Cavallari; Bree Turner; Christine Adams; Wilson Cruz; Matt Prokop; Jaleel White; Jason Olive
- Cinematography: David Waldman
- Edited by: Jon Dudkowski
- Music by: Craig Eastman
- Production company: Zep Tepi Entertainment
- Release date: June 5, 2008
- Running time: 1 hour 45 minutes
- Country: United States
- Language: English

Green Flash (2008), also known as Beach Kings, is a comedy-drama film starring David Charvet, Torrey DeVitto and Kristin Cavallari. Other stars of the film include Bree Turner, Christine Adams, Wilson Cruz and Matt Prokop. The film was directed by Paul Nihipali Jr. and produced by Joseph Barmettler, Cameron Dieterich and Bob Smiland. Shot in Los Angeles, Las Vegas, Hermosa Beach and Manhattan Beach, it was released on June 5, 2008.

== Background ==
Green Flash is writer and producer Paul Nihipali Jr.'s directorial debut. He wanted to share the "true insides of a sport and a subculture" he knows very well. He is a two-time NCAA Champion and three-time All-American for the UCLA's men's volleyball team in the 1990s and a former member of the U.S. National Volleyball Team.

== Plot ==
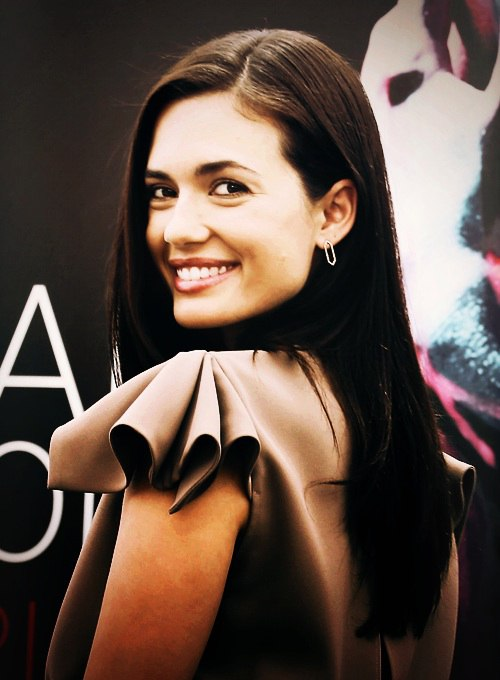
Actress Torrey DeVitto portrayed Mia Fonseca in the film

At age thirty, Cameron Day has given up his chances at a professional basketball career and settled into an aimless life. The mental demands of being a professional athlete were too much for him to handle, and just as he was set to become a professional, the athlete vanished for ten years. A chance encounter with a woman lands him in the middle of Southern California's pro beach volleyball scene. Mia teaches him about the Green Flash: that moment when the sun falls over the horizon and nature becomes brilliant for a fraction of a second. A talented athlete, he seems destined for sports stardom once again until his old issues start re-emerging, threatening his chances at success.

== Cast ==
- David Charvet as Cameron Day, once upon a time basketball star disappeared from the world of sports only to resurface on the shores of Southern California with the dream of winning volleyball’s most prestigious event: The Manhattan Open
- Torrey DeVitto as Mia Fonseca, the brunette beach beauty
- Kristin Cavallari as Lana, the ring leader of The Volley Dollies
- Brody Hutzler as Jeremy Madden, one of the top dogs on the AVP tour
- Court Young as Kenny Fonseca, the Marine Street Gang’s eternal good guy
- Jaleel White as Jason Bootie
- Jason Olive as D'arrel LaCroix
- Bret Roberts as Verde
- Jason Ring as Ima
- Albert Hannemann as Kimo
- Eric Fonoimoana as Sonny
- Danny Farmer as Grubbs
- Lindsey Borden as Heather
- Lauren Rauth as Cassidy
- Cristin Schult as Amberly
