= Leven Thumps and the Gateway to Foo =

2005 novel by Obert Skye

- First edition cover
- Author: Obert Skye
- Cover artist: Ben Sowards
- Language: English
- Series: Leven Thumps
- Publisher: Shadow Mountain
- Publication date: 2005
- Publication place: United States
- Media type: Print (paperback)
- Pages: 359
- Followed by: Leven Thumps and the Whispered Secret

Leven Thumps and the Gateway to Foo is a fantasy novel by Obert Skye that traces the journeys of Leven, a seemingly ordinary boy from Burnt Culvert, Oklahoma, and Winter Frore, a neglected girl, as they seek to find their way to the magical dream land of Foo.

== Characters ==
=== Leven Thumps ===
Leven is fourteen years old and is the grandson of Hector Thumps, the builder of the gateway to Foo. Leven originally knows nothing of Foo or of his heritage. He discovers this information as the story goes on. Leven is an offing, who can manipulate the future, and is being hunted by Sabine (an evil being with many resources and much power).

=== Winter Frore ===
Winter is thirteen, with ratty blond hair and deep evergreen eyes. Her pale skin and willowy clothes give her the appearance of a shy spirit. She was brought to Foo by fate, but her thoughts and memories of her previous life are gone. Winter struggles just to figure out what her purpose is. Winter is a nit with the power to freeze things at will. She first notices this amazing gift when her hair begins to float around in mid air frosted with ice, terrifying her abusive, bloated mother, Janet.

=== Geth ===
Geth is the rightful heir to Foo. He was turned into a seed by Sabine and was left for the birds, but Antsel rescued him, took him to our world and planted him under the ground. He later found Leven, Winter and Clover and accompanies them on their trip to the Gateway. He is a lithen, meaning he believes Fate will decide everything. He works to keep reality and Foo from colliding against the evil Sabine who seeks to rule over both reality and Foo for the worst.

=== Sabine ===
Sabine is the darkest and most selfish being in Foo. Snatched from reality at the age of nine, he is now a nit with the ability to freeze whatever he wishes. Sabine thirsts to know the location of the gateway because he believes if he can freely travel between Foo and reality he can rule them both. So evil and selfish are his desires that the very shadows he casts seek to flee him, giving him the ability to send his dark castoffs down through the dreams of men so he can view and mess with reality.

=== Clover Ernest ===
He is a wisecracking sycophant from Foo, sent to look after Leven, who is his burn. Clover's last burn was Antsel, who dies in the beginning of the first book. The sycophant stays around Leven, hiding for fourteen years, until Leven finally spots him under his bed. He constantly tries to find a nickname for Leven since Winter stole his original, "Lev" (many of which include Chief, Dog, or Big Man). Clover has the power to overshadow other people, and as a sycophant there is only one way that he can die, but only the sycophants know what that is. Clover has his own book: "Professor Winsnicker's Book of Proper Etiquette for Well-Mannered Sycophants".
