= Secret Love (Stevie Nicks song) =

Single by Stevie Nicks

from the album In Your Dreams
- Released: January 13, 2011
- Recorded: 2010
- Genre: Rock, dance
- Length: 3:15
- Label: Reprise
- Songwriter: Stevie Nicks
- Producer: David A. Stewart

Stevie Nicks singles chronology
"Crash into Me" (2009)	"Secret Love" (2011)	"For What It's Worth" (2011)

"Secret Love" is the first single from Stevie Nicks' seventh studio album In Your Dreams released on May 3, 2011. It is her first original single in ten years. "Secret Love" was released on January 13, 2011, via digital download.

Nicks originally wrote the song in 1976 and recorded a demo for Fleetwood Mac's 1977 album, Rumours, but it did not make the cut for the album.

== Music video ==
The music video was directed by David A. Stewart, who produced the In Your Dreams album, and filmed in Nicks' house and backyard. Nicks' goddaughter Kelly appears in the video wearing a vintage dress that Nicks wore on stage in 1976. According to Nicks, Kelly portrays the young Stevie Nicks blending with the soul of Nicks' 62-year-old self.

== Charts ==
Chart (2011)	Peak position
US Billboard Adult Contemporary	20
US Billboard Triple A	25
