= Heather Beers =

American actress

- Occupations: Actress; freelance writer
- Years active: 1999–present

Heather Beers is an American actress and freelance writer. Her two most notable movie roles have been as the title character in Charly (a 2002 independent film based on the 1980 Jack Weyland novel of the same title) and as Charity (the lead female role) in Baptists at Our Barbecue.

== Life and career ==
Beers grew up in southern California, where she attended Los Amigos High School. Her mother was the director of a community theatre, and Beers took lead roles in many of the theatre's productions. Beers received a degree in English from the University of Utah and then worked for many years in a Salt Lake City-based advertising company, while still continuing with her acting career.

Beers has contributed articles to the following magazines: Entrée Magazine, Salt Lake Magazine, Utah Bride, and Utah Style & Design.

In addition to her acting, she contributed her voice to the 2005 video game Amped 3, as well as for Maverik, McCune Mansion, RC Willey, Saturday Night Live, The WB, and the Utah Transit Authority.

Not only was she the lead actress in the movie Charly, she also contributed her professional skills as one of the publicists for the movie.

Beers is also married with children.

== Filmography ==
=== Film ===
Year	Title	Role	Notes
2002	Charly	Charlene 'Charly' Riley	Re-released as Charly's Encore in 2012
2004	Baptists at Our Barbecue	Charity	
2006	Propensity	Melody	
2006	Unaccompanied Minors	Flight Attendant	
2008	The Reunion	Mom	Short
2008	Lock and Roll Forever	Veronique	
2009	One Good Man	Girl's Mother	
2009	Once Upon a Summer	Andy	
2012	12 Dogs of Christmas: Great Puppy Rescue	Zoe	
2013	Christmas for a Dollar	Miss Mayfield	
2014	The Christmas Dragon	Sister Lenora	
2015	Waffle Street	Commercial Realtor	
2016	The Hollow Point	Ellie	
2017	Small Town Crime	AA Group Member	
2017	Love, Kennedy	Heather Hansen	
2019	Phobic	Rachel Dowling	Completed

=== Television ===
Year	Title	Role	Notes
2001	Cover Me	Jean Collins	Episode: "Sub-Zero"
2004, 2006	Everwood	Julie	Episodes: "The Tipping Point", "Ghosts"
2005	Life Is Ruff	Holly	TV film
