= Baptists at Our Barbecue =

- Directed by: Christian Vuissa
- Starring: Dan Merkley; Steve Anderson; Heather Beers; Wayne Brennan; Katherine Brim; Jan Broberg Felt; Bonnie Burt; Michael Anthony Christian; Bernie Diamond; Frank Gerrish
- Distributed by: Blue Crow Productions; Halestorm Entertainment
- Release date: 2004
- Running time: 88 min.
- Language: English
- Budget: $173,306

Baptists at Our Barbecue is a 2004 comedy film based on the 1996 novel of the same name by Robert Farrell Smith. It was directed and produced by Christian Vuissa. The film features the Church of Jesus Christ of Latter-day Saints (LDS Church)-centric humor aimed at Mormon audiences that non-LDS viewers are unlikely to get, as well as some humor appealing to non-Mormon audiences.

== Plot ==
Baptists at Our Barbecue is the story of the small town of Longwinded, Arizona, USA, a divided, feuding town of 262 Mormons and 262 Baptists. It is also a story about one man who will try anything to end the ridiculous feud and bring the town together, and keep the peace-loving girl of his dreams from leaving town.

== Main cast ==
- Dan Merkley as Tartan
- Heather Beers as Charity
- Jan Broberg Felt as Tartan's Mom
- Dane Stephens as Sheriff Bob
- Frank Gerrish as Brother Hatch
- Tony Larimer as Pastor Stevens

== Soundtrack ==
- "New Emotion" – Ryan Shupe & the Rubberband
- "Miracle" – Jamen Brooks
- "Lucia" – The Court & Spark
- "A Thousand Miles" – Angela Pace
- "Long Old Time" – Micah Dahl Anderson
- "Ghosts Are Good Company" – Bishop Allen
- "Grew Young" – Sweethaven
- "Quarry Anthem" – Big Smith
- "Women Thoughts" – Greg Duckwitz
- "Head Up the Mountain" – Jamen Brooks
- "O Sister, There Thou Art" – Micah Dahl Anderson
- "Stretch On, Road" – Night In Wyoming
- "The Calm Before the Storm" – Greg Duckwitz
- "Hallelujah II" – The Court & Spark
- "If" – The Happies
- "Perfectly Complicated" – Tiffany Fronk
- "Let's Have a Barbecue!" – Matt Mattson
