= Leven Thumps and the Eyes of the Want =

2007 novel by Obert Skye

- First edition cover
- Author: Obert Skye
- Cover artist: Ben Sowards
- Language: English
- Series: Leven Thumps
- Genre: Children's fantasy novel
- Publisher: Shadow Mountain
- Publication date: September 25, 2007
- Publication place: United States
- Media type: Print (paperback)
- Pages: 432
- ISBN: 978-1-59038-800-6
- OCLC: 137244607
- LC Class: PZ7.S62877 Ldr 2007
- Preceded by: Leven Thumps and the Whispered Secret
- Followed by: Leven Thumps and the Wrath of Ezra

Leven Thumps and the Eyes of the Want is a fantasy novel by Obert Skye that traces the journeys of Leven, a seemingly ordinary boy from Burnt Culvert, Oklahoma, and Winter Frore, a neglected girl, as they continue their journey in the land of Foo.

== Characters ==
=== Winter Frore ===
Winter is thirteen, with white-blond hair and deep evergreen eyes. Her pale skin and willowy clothes give her the appearance of a neglected girl. Like Sabine, she is a nit and has the ability to freeze and thaw out whatever she wishes. She was swept away to Foo, but her thoughts and memories of her previous life are gone. Winter struggles just to figure out what her purpose is. In book two, her gift is forcefully taken away from her by a machine that she "created" in her past life. She also has a burning love for Leven.

=== Geth ===
The heir to the throne of the land of Foo, and one of the Lithens, the people who were chosen by fate to be on Foo first. He was turned into a Fantrum seed by Sabine, and grew until Terry Graph (Leven's Uncle) chopped him down for destroying his house. Geth then became a toothpick who helped Leven on his quest to stop the war of merging Reality and Foo. In Leven Thumps and the Whispered Secret Geth was returned to his old self in the turrets, and The City of Geth was restored. Because he is a Lithen, he is never afraid and always trusts in fate. He is also incredibly optimistic, though that is probably more because when he was a tree and dropped into a processor at the Tactum Company toothpick section, a part of him was shaved off and placed in a different toothpick. The part chopped off was all his anger and confusion, leaving a happy, carefree Lithen as Geth. Geth has long, dark blonde hair and bright blue eyes. He's very old, but still looks very young. His height is originally tall, but it fluctuates during the books due to part of him being missing. In this book he shrinks. He is told to always wear a look of wonder and amazement on his face.

=== Clover Ernest ===
He is a wise-cracking sycophant from Foo, sent by the nit Antsel to look after Leven, who becomes his burn. Anstel is also Clovers previous burn. He constantly tries to find a nickname for Leven (many of which include Chief and Big Man), as Winter calls Leven Lev. Clover is extremely loyal but often tricks Leven into trying various candies which causes Leven to turn into or become or forget certain things (i.e. Leven turns to goo, or Leven forgets what he is doing). Clover has the power to turn invisible with his cloak, and as a sycophant there is only one way that he can die, but only the sycophants and Leven know what that is. Clovers bite puts people to sleep and makes them love sycophants for a few hours when they wake up.

=== Ezra ===
Ezra is Geth's other half. When Geth was turned into a toothpick, the bad was cut out of him and made into a toothpick that then became Ezra. Ezra is rude and is a devil toothpick that only knows hate. In the second book, Ezra is picked up by a man named Dennis who is or was a janitor for a high dollar business.

=== Dennis ===
Dennis is an emotionally troubled man that stumbles upon a mass of tiny evil, and this evil happens to be Ezra, the toothpick. He was not loved as a child and is not appreciated for his hard work at his job. During a flight to Germany, the evil Sabine is captured by Ezra as hazen maul the plane bringing it to a halt above an interstate. Slowly Sabine starts to take over Dennis leaving him an even emptier shell of a man than he was before. Dennis lacks the ability to dream.

== Awards ==
Leven Thumps and the Gateway to Foo won the Benjamin Franklin award from the Independent Book Publishers Association in 2006.
