= Heber Holiday =

- Directed by: McKay Daines
- Written by: Cameron Daines; McKay Daines
- Produced by: Brent Geisler; Michael Flynn; McKay Daines
- Starring: Torrey DeVitto; Erin Chambers; Thurl Bailey
- Cinematography: Ron Hill
- Edited by: John Lyde
- Music by: Sam Cardon
- Production companies: Flynn-Daines; Triomphe Communications
- Distributed by: Peace Arch Home Entertainment
- Release date: September 14, 2007 (USA)
- Country: US
- Language: English

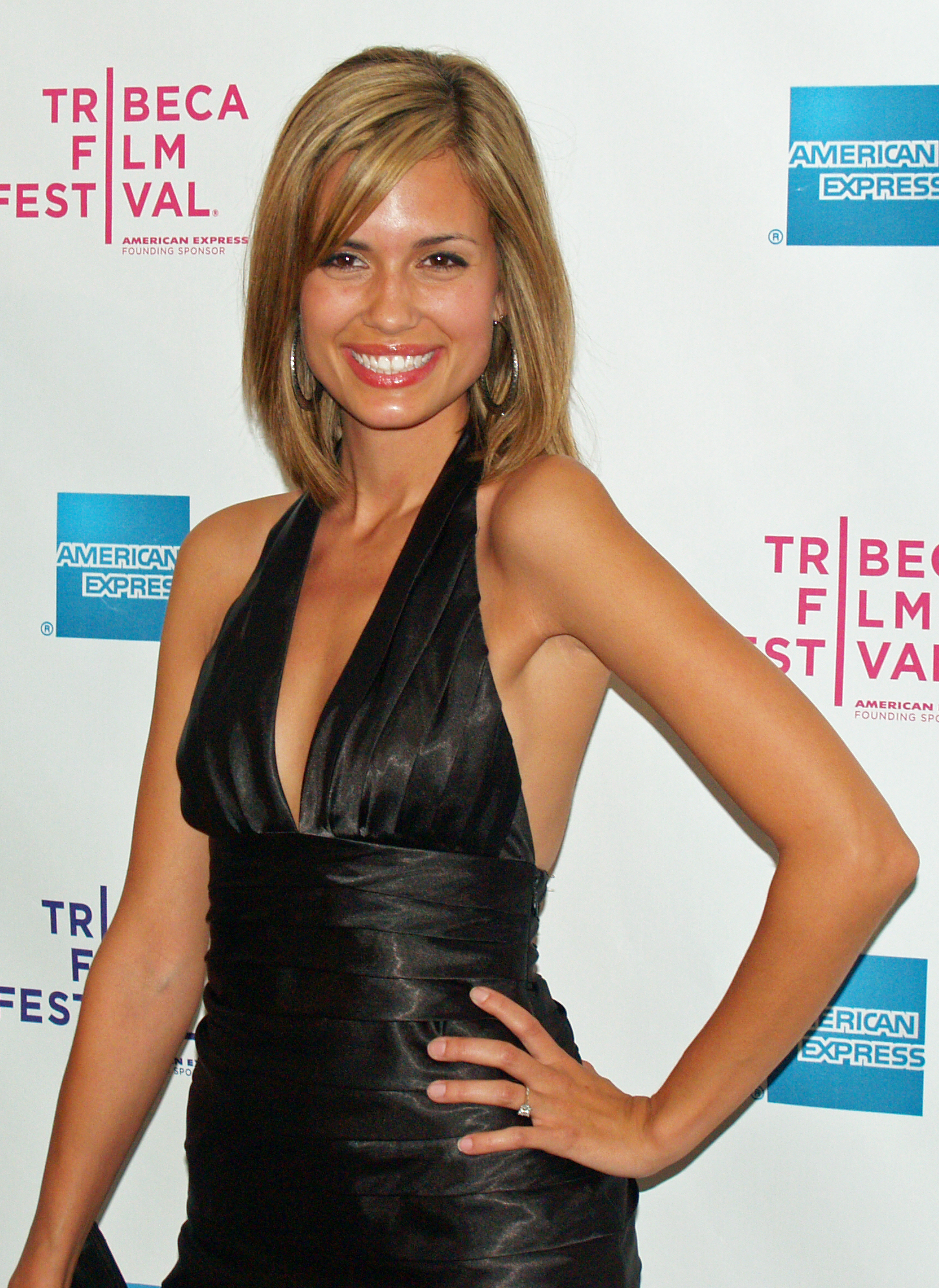
Actress Torrey DeVitto portrayed the lead role of Sierra Young

Heber Holiday (2007), also known as Shooting Star, is a comedy film starring Torrey DeVitto as Sierra Young. Other cast included Scott S. Anderson, Erin Chambers, Jimmy Chunga, Michael Birkeland and Thurl Bailey. The film was directed by McKay Daines. The film won six awards in total. The DVD was released on May 5, 2009 under the name Shooting Star.

== Plot ==
Sierra Young is a rising actress in Hollywood, making $10 million per picture. She's also a spoiled celebrity, who is partying all night, complaining on movie sets and unable to perform well. After a tantrum, in which she gets two black eyes, the director has her sent to a rehab clinic in a remote Utah town. Within a day, she's run away and is taken in by Nettie, who runs a bed and breakfast. Sierra also meets Nettie's grandson, Tyler, head of the local community theater. Sierra invents a name, tells Nettie a wild story, and reads for a part in Tyler's production of "Taming of the Shrew." Meanwhile, her entourage hires a private eye to find her.

== Cast ==
- Torrey DeVitto as Sierra Young
- Erin Chambers as Jodi
- Thurl Bailey as Mutumbo
- Scott S. Anderson as Felix
- K.C. Clyde as Tyler
- Jimmy Chunga as Hound
- Matthew Bellows as Jeff
- Michael Flynn as Mac
- Hailey Evans as Felicia
- Sid Clawson as Tye
- Michael Birkeland as Scott
- Aaron De Jesus as Chauffeur
- Reb Fleming as Doctor

== Awards ==
Award	Category	Nominee	Result
Foursite Film Festival	Best Narrative Film	McKay Daines	Won
Park City Film Music Festival	Best Feature		Won
Park City Film Music Festival	Best Feature Film		Won
Temecula Valley International Film Festival	Best Feature		Won
Temecula Valley International Film Festival	Best Feature Film		Won
