= In Your Dreams (Stevie Nicks album) =

Studio album by Stevie Nicks
- Released: May 3, 2011
- Recorded: February–December 2010; Los Angeles, CA
- Genres: Rock, country
- Length: 64:39
- Label: Reprise
- Producers: David A. Stewart; Glen Ballard

Stevie Nicks chronology
The Soundstage Sessions (2009)	In Your Dreams (2011)	24 Karat Gold: Songs from the Vault (2014)

Singles from In Your Dreams
- 1. "Secret Love" Released: January 13, 2011; 2. "For What It's Worth" Released: July 11, 2011

In Your Dreams is the seventh studio album by American singer-songwriter and Fleetwood Mac vocalist Stevie Nicks, released on May 3, 2011 by Reprise Records. It is her first solo studio album since Trouble in Shangri-La (2001) and also coincides with the 30th anniversary of the release of her debut solo album Bella Donna.

On May 11, 2011, Billboard announced that the album had sold 52,418 copies in its first week of release and debuted at No. 6 on the Billboard 200, giving Nicks her fifth top ten album on that chart. The album spent 16 weeks within the Billboard 200 and has sold 199,000 copies in the United States as of May 2014 according to Nielsen SoundScan. In Your Dreams debuted and peaked at No. 14 on the UK Albums Chart, giving Nicks her fifth Top 20 album there. The accompanying 2011/12 tour though only fairly short, grossed $8.7 million in North America alone.

== Background and composition ==
In late February 2010, David A. Stewart (musician and record producer, best known for his work with Eurythmics) revealed, using his Twitter account, that he was working with Nicks on at least four new songs, including one called "Everybody Loves You". A 38-second snippet of the song was posted on Stewart's Twitter account. He confirmed that he and Nicks were working on an album, and said that it is being done "in a very new way".

On March 16, 2010, Stewart reported on his Twitter that he and Nicks were now recording songs together. On BBC Radio 2 on May 3, 2010, he stated in an interview with DJ Simon Mayo that the new album will be recorded throughout June with a release later that year, however this proved premature.

On July 5, 2010, Stewart tweeted several pictures and messages about him and Nicks working in the studio. In one of the tweets, Stewart stated that he, Nicks, Waddy Wachtel, Mike Campbell, Michael Bradford, Mike Rowe and Steve Ferrone were all working on the album, and that Mick Fleetwood has also contributed drums to at least one track. Waddy Wachtel has been Nicks' lead guitarist for most of her solo career. Stewart also stated in that tweet that seven tracks have been completed thus far and it was their final day of these sessions in the studio together. Nicks was scheduled to play five live dates in the United States in August, and then returned to the studio to complete writing and recording on the album.

The cover of the album was released on March 7, 2011, via Nicks' official website. The cover photograph was taken by Kristin Burns and features Nicks and a horse in a forest scene. The track listing was made available soon after.

== Singles ==
The first single, "Secret Love", was released on January 13, 2011. The single was made available for immediate digital download by pre-ordering the album from online. It is an updated, yet faithful adaptation of the demo that has circulated on the Internet. "Secret Love" peaked at No. 20 on the Billboard Adult Contemporary chart.

A video for "Cheaper Than Free", featuring David A. Stewart, was also released.

"Soldier's Angel" was released to some radio outlets on May 27, 2011. Although the song has not been confirmed to be a single, it has received promotional airplay from several radio stations and purchases of the song through the Lifetime Network as a download supports "The Yellow Ribbon Fund" for the U.S. Military.

On June 16, 2011, it was announced that "For What It's Worth" would be released as the second single for In Your Dreams, according to a press release issued by Live Nation, which also announced Nicks' concert tour. The single was released to radio on July 11, 2011. The music video for the single was released on August 24, 2011. "For What It's Worth" debuted on the Billboard Adult Contemporary chart at No. 25 on September 22, 2011.

A video for "Moonlight (A Vampire's Dream)" was released on October 13, 2011.

== Critical reception ==
Professional ratings
Aggregate scores
Source	Rating
Metacritic	62/100
Review scores
Source	Rating
AllMusic	4/5 stars
The Boston Globe	4/5 stars
Entertainment Weekly	A
New York Daily News	4/5 stars
Rolling Stone	3.5/5 stars
Slant Magazine	1.5/5 stars
US Weekly	4/4 stars

Upon release, the album received mostly positive reviews, with several critics hailing In Your Dreams as the best album of Nicks's solo career.

AllMusic's Stephen Thomas Erlewine commented that producer Stewart's "real coup is focus, letting each element fit snugly together so In Your Dreams winds up capturing the essence of Stevie Nicks, which, as her previous three decades of solo albums prove, is no easy feat.", giving the album four of five stars.

Mikael Wood of Entertainment Weekly gave the release an "A", saying "We'll never complain about hearing Stevie warble the word dreams; indeed, several times here she comes remarkably close to Fleetwood Mac's platinum-plated best."

== Promotion ==
On March 25, 2011, Reprise Records released a promotional trailer for the album.

On April 13, 2011, Nicks appeared on The Oprah Winfrey Show performing the single "Secret Love." A video for the song "Cheaper Than Free" was made available on April 12, 2011 as a free download on the iTunes Store. On April 26, 2011, the music video for the first single "Secret Love" was released. The video features Nicks, Dave Stewart and Mick Fleetwood. The album was available to be streamed in its entirety exclusively at the Rolling Stone website on April 27, 2011.

On account of a bout of pneumonia and the flu, Nicks had to cancel several appearances in New York during the week of her album release, including her appearance on The Today Show and a performance at Webster Hall.

Nicks appeared on The Ellen DeGeneres Show again on May 10, 2011, this time performing her single, "Secret Love". On May 17, 2011, she made an appearance on Dancing with the Stars, performing two songs, "Landslide" and "Secret Love."

Nicks made her first solo promotional visit to the United Kingdom since 1989 in mid-June, appearing on popular TV programs such as BBC Breakfast and Loose Women and doing several interviews for The Sun, The Daily Mail and The Telegraph newspapers and several magazines. On June 26, Nicks appeared at Hard Rock Calling festival in London's Hyde Park (her first solo live appearance in Europe since 1989) and performed for a crowd of 50,000+ people. The following day, Nicks appeared at HMV Oxford Circus for an album signing and fan meet to promote the release of In Your Dreams.

She performed a duet of "Landslide" with Javier Colon on NBC's The Voice on June 29, 2011.

Nicks appeared on America's Got Talent on July 27, 2011, making the televised debut of her second single from the album, "For What It's Worth", as well as performing her classic "Edge of Seventeen". She also performed the single on The Tonight Show with Jay Leno on July 28.

On August 26, 2011, Nicks performed "For What It's Worth", "Landslide" and "Rhiannon" on Good Morning America, as part of their "Summer Concert Series".

September 13, 2011, she appeared on The Talk performing "Rhiannon", "Edge of Seventeen", "Landslide" and the second single from the new album, "For What It's Worth".

== Stevie Nicks: In Your Dreams documentary ==
The 2010 recording of the studio album, her first in almost a decade, was documented in Nicks' home studio and shows the collaborative process between her and Stewart. The film was directed by Nicks and Stewart, produced by Weapons of Mass Entertainment and released with a limited theatrical run on 2 April 2013 by Abramorama film distribution. A nomination for the Audience Award was received at the 2013 SXSW Film Festival. Reprise Records home video released the DVD and digital video on 3 December 2013.

== Track listing ==
No.	Title	Lyrics	Music	Length
1.	"Secret Love"	Stevie Nicks	Nicks	3:15
2.	"For What It's Worth"	Nicks	Michael Campbell	4:32
3.	"In Your Dreams"	Nicks	Dave Stewart	3:58
4.	"Wide Sargasso Sea"	Nicks	Stewart	5:36
5.	"New Orleans"	Nicks	Neale Heywood	5:34
6.	"Moonlight (A Vampire's Dream)"	Nicks	Nicks	5:26
7.	"Annabel Lee"	Edgar Allan Poe; Nicks	Nicks; Waddy Wachtel	5:58
8.	"Soldier's Angel" (featuring Lindsey Buckingham)	Nicks	Nicks	5:16
9.	"Everybody Loves You" (featuring Dave Stewart)	Nicks; Stewart	Stewart	5:16
10.	"Ghosts Are Gone"	Nicks	Stewart	6:06
11.	"You May Be the One"	Nicks	Stewart	5:26
12.	"Italian Summer"	Nicks	Stewart	4:38
13.	"Cheaper Than Free" (featuring Dave Stewart)	Nicks	Stewart	3:38
Total length:				1:04:39

Barnes & Noble/UK/Limited Fan edition
No.	Title	Lyrics	Music	Length
1.	"Secret Love"	Nicks	Nicks	3:15
2.	"For What It's Worth"	Nicks	Campbell	4:32
3.	"In Your Dreams"	Nicks	Stewart	3:58
4.	"Wide Sargasso Sea"	Nicks	Stewart	5:36
5.	"New Orleans"	Nicks	Heywood	5:34
6.	"Moonlight (A Vampire's Dream)"	Nicks	Nicks	5:26
7.	"Annabel Lee"	Poe; Nicks	Nicks; Wachtel	5:58
8.	"My Heart"	Nicks	Campbell	4:12
9.	"Soldier's Angel" (featuring Lindsey Buckingham)	Nicks	Nicks	5:16
10.	"Everybody Loves You" (featuring Dave Stewart)	Nicks; Stewart	Stewart	5:16
11.	"Ghosts Are Gone"	Nicks	Stewart	6:06
12.	"You May Be the One"	Nicks	Stewart	5:26
13.	"Italian Summer"	Nicks	Stewart	4:38
14.	"Cheaper Than Free" (featuring Dave Stewart)	Nicks	Stewart	3:38
Total length:				1:08:51

iTunes deluxe edition
No.	Title	Length
14.	"Secret Love" (video)	3:26
15.	"Cheaper Than Free" (featuring Dave Stewart) (video)	3:40
Total length:		1:11:45

== Charts ==
Chart (2011)	Peak position
US Billboard 200	6
US Billboard Top Rock Albums	3
Australian Albums Chart	24
Belgian Albums Chart	90
Canadian Albums Chart	24
Dutch Albums Chart	47
German Albums Chart	37
Irish Albums Chart	33
New Zealand Albums Chart	35
Norwegian Albums Chart	39
Swedish Albums Chart	39
UK Albums Chart	14

Chart (2024)	Peak position
Hungarian Physical Albums (MAHASZ)	28

== Personnel ==
- Stevie Nicks: vocals, keyboards, percussion
- Sharon Celani: backing vocals
- Lori Nicks: backing vocals
- Mick Fleetwood: drums
- Lindsey Buckingham: guitar, backing vocals on "Soldier's Angel"
- Ned Douglas: keyboards
- Ricky Peterson: Hammond organ, piano
- Mike Rojas: Hammond organ, piano
- Zac Rae: Hammond organ
- Mike Rowe: keyboards, Hammond organ
- Glen Ballard: guitars, keyboards and piano
- David A. Stewart: guitars, vocals
- Tom Bukovac: guitar
- Rob Cavallo: guitar
- Neale Heywood: guitar
- Waddy Wachtel: guitar
- Greg Leisz: mandolin
- Mike Campbell: guitar, bass, keyboards, drums, percussion
- Mike Bradford: bass
- Simon Smith: bass
- Michael Rhodes: bass
- Al Ortiz: bass
- Chad Cromwell: drums
- Steve Ferrone: drums
- Blair Sinta: drums
- Scott Campbell: drum programming and additional percussion
- Lenny Castro: percussion
- Mike Fasano: percussion
- Ann Marie Calhoun: violin
- Torrey DeVitto: violin

== Production ==
- Produced by Glen Ballard, Mike Campbell & Dave Stewart
- Engineers: Scott Campbell, Ned Douglas, Karen Johnston, Mike Linett, John McBride
- Recording assistants: Marcus Johnson, Shin Miyazawa, Chris Owens
- Mixing: Chris Lord-Alge; assisted by Keith Armstrong, Nik Karpin, Andrew Schubert & Brad Townsend
- Mastered by Ted Jensen
