= Leven Thumps =

Series of children's fantasy novels by Obert Skye

Leven Thumps Series
- Leven Thumps and the Gateway to Foo; Leven Thumps and the Whispered Secret; Leven Thumps and the Eyes of The Want; Leven Thumps and the Wrath of Ezra; Leven Thumps and the Ruins of Alder
- Author: Obert Skye
- Cover artist: Ben Sowards
- Country: United States
- Language: English
- Genre: Children's, fantasy novels
- Publisher: Shadow Mountain
- Published: 2005 – 2009
- Media type: Print (hardcover and paperback)

Leven Thumps is a series of children's fantasy novels by Obert Skye. The series, which has five books, deals with an orphaned 14-year-old boy, Leven Thumps, who becomes involved in a battle between good and evil. The five books in the series are titled Leven Thumps and the Gateway to Foo (2005), Leven Thumps and the Whispered Secret (2006), Leven Thumps and the Eyes of The Want (2007), Leven Thumps and the Wrath of Ezra (2008), and Leven Thumps and the Ruins of Alder (2009). These books were originally published by Shadow Mountain Publishing. Leven Thumps and the Gateway to Foo won the Benjamin Franklin award from the Independent Book Publishers Association in 2006.

The Leven Thumps series was followed by another series, a trilogy entitled Beyond Foo. The first book, Geth and the Return of the Lithens, was released on May 9, 2011.

== Plot overview ==
The little town of Burnt Culvert has a problem. Storms like never before are arising. This is the beginning of the end. Foo is falling. Evil is seeping into the world, Leven and Winter's romance is beginning to be obvious, and dreams are not as they should be. Twisted minds overpower Foo. Strange things are beginning to happen in the world. Clouds are territorial; buildings walk to the opposite side of the street; and weird bugs are carrying people off. Everyone is jittery. Only Leven Thumps can save the day.

=== Leven Thumps and the Gateway to Foo ===
Leven comes into the world soon after his father "dies" in a car accident. His mother passes away a few minutes after giving birth to him. His mother's half-sister, Addy Graph, reluctantly takes him into her care but allows him to be bullied by her husband, supplying him only with Wonder Wipes T-shirts from her current job. Leven is a young teen of fourteen living in Oklahoma when he finds Clover the Sycophant under his bed on the porch. Clover informs him, "The entire world practically depends on you. No pressure though". From that moment on, Leven's life will never be the same again. He meets and becomes friends with a thirteen-year-old girl named Winter. He meets the toothpick and lithen, Geth, who is also the single true heir of Foo and trusts Fate more than anything else. Together, Leven and his friends journey halfway across the world to find the mysterious gateway to Foo and put an end to the devious man behind the gateway. Leven, Winter, Clover, and Geth attempt to save the whole world from mass chaos.

=== Leven Thumps and the Eyes of The Want ===
Humanity's only hope is Leven Thumps. Not only must Leven race across Foo to stop the whispered secret before the deadly truth is revealed, but he must also travel to the mysterious island of Lith. There abides the Want, the maniac dream-master who can give Leven the gifts he needs against a foreboding army of rants and other foo beings. Leven starts his journey in a hotel with Geth, Clover, and Winter. Later in the night, The Whispered Secret speaks to Leven. The secret it holds is the Secret of the Sycophants, explaining how Sycophants die. The secret blackmails Leven with the life of Clover (the secret will kill Clover if Leven refuses to give it its key). Leven gives it the key, but then sees the secret sell himself to a man, who buries it. Soon, the sycophant population on Sycophant Run hears through the Lore Coil that the sycophant secret has been revealed. Meanwhile, Tim Tuttle meets Dennis and Ezra. Dennis is already being controlled by Sabine, and gives Tim a wristband which poisons Tim with the influence of Sabine. The trio carjacks a van and then starts driving across the U.S. to get to the Atlantic Ocean. Dennis, Tim, and Ezra start building the gateway. When Dennis is gone, Tim remembers a secret: he hates Dennis. With this knowledge, he believes that he has the power to fight off the influence of Sabine. When Leven and Clover get separated from Winter and Geth, their onick takes them to Lith, the island where The Want resides. Once the duo gets to Lith, they meet The Want. He looks like a human with a long, red beard. Leven starts feeling powerful emotions, because The Want sees every dream that comes in and out of Foo. The Want takes Leven to a room known as The Den of the Dead, where Antsel comes alive and gets the scoop on how things are in Foo. Leven then learns more about his past and sees his mother. Leven is then taken up to a high tower where The Want wants to have a chat. The Want says that tonight he'll ask Leven to do a great task for him. Leven will have to listen to his voice, and do what it instructs. Winter and Geth's onick flies them to a random place, where they are captured by Azure, an old defendant of Foo who has turned to Sabine's side. Azure takes them the Hall of the Council of Wonder, the meeting place of the defendants of Foo where he tortures Geth by reading the names of the previous defendants who have died. Azure also says that he has tricked The Want into releasing The Dearth, the evil soil under Foo that has been controlling Sabine, into coming to Foo where it will mesh Foo and reality if it gets above ground. Azure then takes all of them to Lith, where he imprisons Geth, Winter, and two of his other servants in one cell. On the way, Azure tells Geth and Winter that he is destroying them and Leven in exchange for the location and instructions to open the second gateway to Foo. Once Winter and Geth are in the cell, Lith starts sinking, but Winter cleverly finds a way out. Meanwhile, Tim Tuttle falls out of a tree and is knocked unconscious. Dennis and Ezra leave him because Ezra gets a sense that there is another gateway, so Dennis follows him. Tim has a sudden revelation and remembers the gateway. He dives in the Konigsee and gets to Foo. Leven is alone in a building on The Want’s instructions. Leven listens to The Want’s voice saying "come". The Want is trying to get Leven to destroy him (he's old and tired of life). Leven then hears a voice in his head telling him to thrust a sword into the darkness. He thinks it is someone warning him of danger. In self-defense, he strikes, then realizes he has killed The Want. With his dying breath, The Want reveals that he is in reality the third Want, and Leven's grandfather, Hector Thumps. Hector was the one who started the whole thing by finding a way out of Foo. He also tells Leven that he was sick of being the Want, and had planned for a long time to have Leven "accidentally" kill him. The Want also reveals that whoever kills the Want, becomes the Want. Before Hector dies, he wishes Leven luck in saving Foo. Soon, Leven reunites with Geth, Winter, and Clover. Leven being the Want is very startling to his friends, especially Winter, who has developed a deep love for Leven in the end.

=== Leven Thumps and the Ruins of Alder ===
Leven, Winter, Geth, and Clover travel towards the gateway through Sycophant Run. The love for Leven from Winter is revealed when they accidentally let a longing lose and she wants to be with him, but fate has other plans for Leven. He and Clover shadow-travel to Alder and are set out to get through unfinished business to get to the oldest tree in Foo.

== Characters ==
- Leven Thumps: Titular protagonist of the series, a boy who can manipulate fate, also called an offing. He embarks on a journey to defeat Sabine and his evil shadows. Leven becomes the Want. He and Winter fall in love and kiss in the 4th and 5th book. He is also Clover's 'burn' throughout the series.
- Winter: A girl possessing the power to control ice. She was brought to Foo, but was later changed into a baby and brought to Reality in order to help Leven with his quest. She lived with her mother (not her real mother) Janet, who did not care for her. She went to Oklahoma to escape her mother and ended up on a quest to help Leven defeat Sabine. She later ends up losing her gift, but she regains it over time in Leven Thumps and the Ruins Of Alder. Winter falls deeply in love with Leven. They finally kiss in the 4th and 5th book.
- Clover: Leven's sycophant. His pockets hold many things as sycophants favor in strange things. Clover eats an assortment of candy and goods which the Eggmen create. However, Leven is usually against eating these strange foods, because he had tried Clover's mind and body altering candy way too many times to trust them.
- Geth: The true heir of Foo. He is turned into a seed by Sabine and planted in Leven's yard by Antsel where he grows into a large tree. Eventually he is cut down to the size of a toothpick and hangs around in Winter's pocket. He leads Leven to Foo and has unwavering faith in fate.
- Sabine: An antagonist in the series. He travels into Reality to rule both Foo and Reality. Like Winter, he is a nit who can control ice. He is later destroyed by Clover. His remains were destroyed in Reality by Ezra, and by Leven on the island of Alder.
- Jamoon: Sabine's elite warrior. As a rant, half of him changes constantly to the dreams of others and his appearance varies. He is defeated by Leven.
- Terry: Leven's uncle. He is cruel and lazy. The only thing he likes is drinking. Chops Geth down when he was still a tree. He finds Antsel's cloak while searching with a metal detector. He and Addy are both killed in a car accident.
- Addy: Terry's wife and Leven's mother's half sister. She goes nuts whenever Leven calls her his "aunt". She agreed to take care of him when his mother died soon after his birth. She is cruel and cold towards him, but slightly better than Terry. Occasionally sticks up for Leven but doesn't try very hard at it. Her house is smashed down by Geth. She and Terry are both killed in a car accident.
- Hector Thumps: Leven's grandfather and the creator of the gateway bordering from Reality and Foo. His quest to go from Reality and Foo drove him crazy, but he was a very brilliant man. Everyone believes him to be dead. He married Amelia after returning to Foo for the second time and has a son that Anstel took back to Reality. It is later revealed that he is the Want, but he selfishly has Leven kill him so he could pass on and Leven becomes the Want.
- Amelia is Hector Thump's wife; she is believed to be dead, but she actually reverts to her younger self. She has a hidden gateway to reality in her home under the floor.
- Tim Tuttle: Tim was at one point Winter's neighbor. He has cared for her over the years. Once she goes missing, he searches for her. After a long adventure in Foo, he comes back to Reality and is tearfully reunited with his family. It is unknown what his gift is. His sycophant is named Swig.
- Dennis: A plain janitor who worked at a law firm. Dennis is very antisocial and has never had a dream. His life later changes when he meets Ezra as a toothpick in his turkey sandwich. He agrees to help Ezra in his hope to finally dream. He fell from a helicopter in the 5th book, but he was wearing Antsel's cloak so he may have survived.
- Ezra: A major antagonist in the series, Tatum Company cut Geth's soul in half, and so his angry, evil side was transferred into another toothpick. He disappears into Geth's old stump out of sorrow for losing Dennis in Ruins of Alder. Geth then regains the lost part of his being.
- The Dearth: The Dearth is the main antagonist of the series. A giant blob-like thing of dirt, he lived beneath the soil in Foo before escaping. His disguise is an old English Man. He tries to destroy Reality and Foo, knowing only soil will remain, which means he would live and start a new world.
- Phoebe is a longing and the last of her kind. She was shown to Leven by the Want. In Leven Thumps and the Wrath of Ezra she is released by Leven, and flies over Foo making more people feel passionate. She falls in love with Geth.
- Lilly was once Winter's sycophant. She was first mentioned by Clover in the 2nd book. She falls in love with Clover and gets Winter back.

== Glossary ==
=== Lithen ===
Lithens are the original inhabitants of Foo. They were placed there by fate. Their mission is to preserve the real Foo, and its place as a modifier of dreams. The most prominent lithen is Geth. They are extremely honest and are believed to be incorruptible, although throughout the series Geth is the only Lithen who hasn't been corrupted. They live by fate, and are afraid of nothing.

=== Niteon ===
Nits are also called niteons. They are humans who had been on Earth and brought to Foo by Fate. They are the working class of Foo. They are stable and one of the best dream enhancers. After they arrive in Foo, they are given a powerful gift. For example, many nits can control ice or levitate. They are usually loyal and honest. Winter Frore and Sabine are examples of nits, and they both can control ice. Antsel is also a nit. He can see through soil. The entire list of specialized Niteon powers are as follows (except for manipulating dreams, which is a gift that all nits possess and also cogs):

- See through soil
- Run like the wind
- Freeze things
- Breathe fire
- Levitate objects
- Burrow
- Shrink
- Throw lightning
- Fade in and out
- Fly
- See through stone
- Push and bind dreams

=== Offing ===
Offings are rare and extremely powerful. They can see and manipulate the future, and can also learn additional gifts. Offings are the most trusted confidants of the Want, the sage of Foo. Leven is an Offing.

=== Rant ===
Rants are the ungifted offspring of a nit and a cog that were born with too little character to manipulate dreams successfully. They are frequently in a disarray. As dreams catch them, half of their bodies become the imagination of what the one in reality is dreaming of. They are usually dressed in long robes to hide their unstable forms. Jamoon, who is one of Sabine's most loyal servants, is a powerful rant.

=== Sycophant ===
Sycophants are humanoid, furry creatures that dwell in a place called Sycophant Run. They are assigned to people in Foo to guide them. The people they serve are referred to as their "burns". Many Sycophants hang out around the entrance of Foo and fight over the upcoming "burns" coming out of the entrance. This is an extremely trying experience because the human who has come to Foo not only is completely shocked, but also covered in talking, furry creatures.

=== The Want ===
The Want is the invisible, but felt sage of Foo. He lives on the island of Lith, and sees every dream that comes in. He is prophetic, but a bit insane from his visions. He also has all the gifts of nits. It is revealed that Hector Thumps, Leven's grandfather, is the Want. He tricks Leven into killing him, thus making Leven the Want. The Want can control any animals in Foo, but not Rants, Cogs, Lithens, or other Nits.

=== Cog ===
Cogs are ungifted children of nits. They have no single talent, but they can manipulate and enhance dreams.

=== Whisp ===
When those from Earth step on a way to get to Foo, they may not get there completely. They only partially arrive, since their bodies and souls stay on Earth. They are called whisps, and are similar to ghosts. They are members of governing councils and boards. They are very vulnerable to flattery, and wish most for soul stones, to become whole. The only way to kill a whisp is to suck it up by anything, like a vacuum, until their mass is gathered enough to become solid. Only then are they vulnerable to physical harm.

=== Avaland ===
Avalands are giants made out of the earth. They can actually form together to make a bigger creature. Avalands have met Leven on two occasions. The first time, one Avaland pursued Winter, Leven, and Clover but, thanks to Leven's timing, toppled off a cliff. The second time, a gang of Avalands attacked and formed together to make a giant rock snake. The snake devoured Leven and Winter but they made the Avaland to choke out the two by freezing Leven.

=== Telt ===
Telts are basically Foo's version of a tornado, but made mostly of spinning dirt and debris and able to pick things up and "eat" them. The only way to kill them is by using water or some other liquid. Telts were first introduced in Leven Thumps and the Gateway to Foo, although they are not actually seen until Leven Thumps and the Eyes of the Want.

=== Longing ===
Longings were beings who flew over Foo and make people have a greater longing for what they already long for. Longings were first introduced in Leven Thumps and the Eyes of The Want. There is only one longing that is left. Her name is Phoebe and she is in love with Geth (the last true lithen) who loves her back. It is mentioned in the book that the reason Foo is falling a part is because Phoebe could not keep people longing for good, so they became selfish.

== Spin-off ==
There is a spin-off book, known as Professor Winsnicker's Book of Proper Etiquette for Well-mannered Sycophants which is Clover's handbook from when he was in school. Obert Skye happened to come across it because Clover dropped the book in reality.

== Sequel series (Beyond Foo) ==
A sequel series, titled Beyond Foo, is a trilogy taking place shortly after Leven Thumps and the Ruins of Alder. The first book, Geth and the Return of the Lithens, was released on May 9, 2011. The second book, Geth and the Deception of Dreams, was released on September 10, 2012. As of April 2025, there has been no word about any release for the third and final book of the series.

In the first book, Geth has existed for hundreds of years. In Foo, the realm that allows humans to hope, imagine, and dream, Geth is one of the strongest and most respected beings, a powerful and wise lithen. At the conclusion of the Leven Thumps series, the realm of Foo has once again found balance - dreams can thrive and grow. With things in order, Geth and Clover set off to find a new adventure that leads beyond the guarded border of Foo and into an unknown land where dreams have been trapped and freedom has been crushed. Geth, always a defender of fate and truth, goes on a quest with many life lessons to be learned.

== Film adaptation ==
At October 2006 the film company Celtic Rose Entertainment optioned the rights of the series along with distributor 20th Century Fox. At a book signing in the North Texas area the author stated that he had sold the rights to the film version of the first book 'about a month ago' (from Dec. 2007) and that it was being made by "the people who made the Spider-Man films". He casually shrugged off the question of who was going to take the role of Leven by asking in response 'who here would like to play Leven?'. Currently the film is in preproduction. The author, Obert Skye, has said that the movie has been "optioned and re-optioned" several times. He then went on to state that he is planning a standalone series that follows the story of an older Leven and Winter, which he hopes will bring the excitement level back up for the Leven Thumps series, and possibly get the talks for a movie adaptation going again.
