= Thurl Bailey =

American basketball player (born 1961)

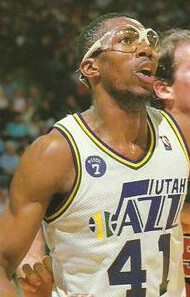
- Bailey, circa 1988

Personal information
- Born: April 7, 1961 (age 65) Washington, D.C., U.S.
- Listed height: 6 ft 11 in (2.11 m)
- Listed weight: 247 lb (112 kg)

Career information
- High school: Bladensburg (Bladensburg, Maryland)
- College: NC State (1979–1983)
- NBA draft: 1983: 1st round, 7th overall pick
- Drafted by: Utah Jazz
- Playing career: 1983–1999
- Position: Power forward
- Number: 41

Career history
- 1983–1991: Utah Jazz
- 1991–1994: Minnesota Timberwolves
- 1994–1995: Panionios
- 1995–1997: Polti Cantù
- 1997–1998: Olimpia Stefanel Milano
- 1999: Utah Jazz

Career highlights
- NBA All-Rookie First Team (1984); Italian League All-Star Game MVP (1997); Greek League All-Star (1994 II); NCAA champion (1983); First-team All-ACC (1983); Second-team All-ACC (1982); No. 41 jersey honored by NC State Wolfpack

Career NBA statistics
- Points: 11,834 (12.8 ppg)
- Rebounds: 4,718 (5.1 rpg)
- Blocks: 1,086 (1.2 bpg)
- Stats at NBA.com
- Stats at Basketball Reference

Thurl Lee Bailey Sr. (born April 7, 1961) is an American former professional basketball player. A power forward, his National Basketball Association (NBA) career spanned from 1983 to 1999 with the Utah Jazz and the Minnesota Timberwolves. Bailey has been a broadcast analyst for the Utah Jazz and the University of Utah— in addition to work as an inspirational speaker, singer, songwriter, and film actor. Bailey garnered the nickname "Big T" during his basketball career.

== Playing career ==
Bailey attended North Carolina State University and was a leader in the Wolfpack's miracle run to the 1983 NCAA Championship. That year, under head coach Jim Valvano, he led the Wolfpack in both scoring and rebounding. The Utah Jazz selected him as the 7th pick of the 1983 NBA draft. Jazz management reported that he was selected for the quality of his character, as well as the quality of his game. This was the beginning of 16 years of playing professional basketball, with 12 of those years in the NBA. Bailey's career-high points game came on March 14, 1988, when he scored 41 points and grabbed 8 rebounds in a 116–115 win over the Denver Nuggets.

Bailey was a starter with the Jazz for most of his first two seasons, but with the drafting of Karl Malone, Jazz coach Frank Layden made Bailey one of the first options off the bench. As a result, Bailey had his two finest NBA seasons in 1987–88 (19.6 ppg, played in all 82 games and started ten times) and 1988–89 (19.5 ppg, 82 games, three starts). Both seasons saw him finish second in the Sixth Man of the Year voting. During Bailey's Utah tenure, he played in 665 games, missing only four games in which he was eligible to play.

On November 25, 1991, he was traded by the Jazz along with a 1992 second-round draft pick to the Minnesota Timberwolves for Tyrone Corbin. Bailey holds the unusual distinction of playing 84 combined regular-season games during the 1991–92 season for both teams. He played for almost three seasons in Minnesota, until 1994, when he left the NBA and played in the Greek League (playing for Panionios) for the 1994–95 season. From 1995 to 1998, he played in the Italian League for Polti Cantù in 1995–97 and Stefanel Milano in 1997–98, before returning to the Jazz as a free agent on January 21, 1999. He retired after the end of the 1998–99 season.

== Post-playing career ==
Bailey is a public speaker, a broadcast analyst for the Utah Jazz and the University of Utah, an actor, and a singer/songwriter. Bailey's albums include Faith in Your Heart (1998), The Gift of Christmas (2001), and I'm Not the Same (2002).

Bailey is chairman of Big T Productions, Fertile Earth (which has a patent pending on a fertilizer that works through irrigation sprinkler systems), and FourLeaf Films.

He works with various charities, including Make-A-Wish, D.A.R.E., and the Happy Factory.

Bailey continues to coach in the Salt Lake City area using the private coaching service CoachUp.

== Personal life ==
Bailey was born in Washington, D.C., and grew up in a high-crime neighborhood of Seat Pleasant, Maryland bordering D.C. He was a graduate of Bladensburg High School in Bladensburg, Maryland

Bailey is the father of six children. He has a daughter, Chonell, with his high school sweetheart and two sons, Thurl Jr., and TeVaun from his first marriage. Bailey and his wife, Sindi (née Southwick), live in Highland, Utah with their three children BreElle, Brendan, and Bryson. His son Brendan played basketball at Marquette.

Bailey was raised Baptist. While playing basketball in Italy, Bailey decided to join the Church of Jesus Christ of Latter-day Saints. He was baptized on December 31, 1995.

Bailey gave the opening prayer at the 2008 Republican National Convention.

== Career statistics ==
Legend
GP	Games played	GS	Games started	MPG	Minutes per game
FG%	Field goal percentage	3P%	3-point field goal percentage	FT%	Free throw percentage
RPG	Rebounds per game	APG	Assists per game	SPG	Steals per game
BPG	Blocks per game	PPG	Points per game	**Bold**	Career high
*	Led the league

=== NBA ===
==== Regular season ====
Year	Team	GP	GS	MPG	FG%	3P%	FT%	RPG	APG	SPG	BPG	PPG
1983–84	Utah	81	54	24.8	**.512**	–	.752	5.7	1.6	.5	**1.5**	8.5
1984–85	Utah	80	**68**	31.0	.490	**1.000**	.**842**	**6.6**	1.7	**.6**	1.2	15.2
1985–86	Utah	82	13	28.8	.448	.000	.830	6.0	**1.9**	.5	1.4	14.6
1986–87	Utah	81	2	26.6	.447	.000	.805	5.3	1.3	.5	1.1	13.8
1987–88	Utah	82	10	**34.2**	.492	.333	.826	6.5	**1.9**	**.6**	**1.5**	**19.6**
1988–89	Utah	82*	3	33.9	.483	.400	.825	5.5	1.7	**.6**	1.1	19.5
1989–90	Utah	82*	33	31.5	.481	.000	.779	5.0	1.7	.4	1.2	14.2
1990–91	Utah	82*	22	30.3	.458	.000	.808	5.0	1.5	**.6**	1.1	12.4
1991–92	Utah	**13***	0	25.2	.386	.000	.800	6.0	1.5	.4	1.2	9.4
1991–92	Minnesota	**71***	18	25.0	.448	.000	.795	5.7	.8	.4	1.4	11.7
1992–93	Minnesota	70	3	18.2	.455	–	.838	3.1	.9	.3	.7	7.5
1993–94	Minnesota	79	3	16.4	.510	–	.799	2.7	.7	.3	.7	7.4
1998–99	Utah	43	0	12.6	.446	.000	.735	2.2	.6	.2	.7	4.2
Career		928	229	26.8	.473	.114	.812	5.1	1.4	.5	1.2	12.8

==== Playoffs ====
Year	Team	GP	GS	MPG	FG%	3P%	FT%	RPG	APG	SPG	BPG	PPG
1984	Utah	**11**		30.9	**.515**	.000	.810	5.5	.9	.2	1.0	10.6
1985	Utah	10	**10**	37.5	.408	–	.818	**9.2**	2.7	.5	1.8	16.9
1986	Utah	4	4	36.8	.364	.000	.727	8.0	**3.3**	.5	.5	16.0
1987	Utah	5	0	30.2	.476	–	**1.000**	6.0	1.8	.6	1.2	15.6
1988	Utah	**11**	0	**40.8**	.488	.000	.838	5.7	1.6	.5	**2.1**	**23.2**
1989	Utah	3	2	40.7	.353	–	.800	8.3	1.0	.3	1.3	12.0
1990	Utah	5	5	38.0	.489	–	.792	6.4	1.4	**1.0**	1.2	21.0
1991	Utah	9	0	25.3	.359	–	.880	3.6	1.0	.3	.7	7.6
1999	Utah	**11**	0	10.5	**.515**	–	.750	1.4	.2	.3	.5	3.4
Career		69	21	30.7	.449	.000	.834	5.5	1.4	.4	1.2	13.5

== Filmography ==
Year	Title	Role	Note
1994	Thurl: Forward with New Power	Himself	Documentary
2001	The Luck of the Irish	Mr. Holloway	Disney Channel Original Movie
2002	The Singles Ward	A Traveler	Movie
2005	David and Goliath	Goliath of Gath	Movie
2006	Church Ball	Moses Mahoney	Movie
2007	Heber Holiday	Mutumbo	Movie
2013	Running with the Pack	Himself	Documentary
2013	30 for 30	Himself	Survive and Advance
