= Sometimes It Rains =

Single by David Charvet

from the album Se laisser quelque chose
- Released: 3 July 2006 (physical release); 1 May 2006 (radio edit, pre-release)
- Recorded: 2004
- Genre: Soft rock
- Label: Mercury Records (recording label); Universal Music (distribution)
- Songwriter(s): Arnie Roman; Ty Lacy
- Producer(s): Steve Power

David Charvet singles chronology
"Je te dédie" (2004)	"Sometimes It Rains" (2006)	"I Swim With the Birds" (2010)

Music video
- "Sometimes It Rains" on YouTube

"Sometimes It Rains" is a 2006 single by David Charvet, his last release before returning to an acting and television career. The song is co-written by Arnie Roman (who had penned songs for the Pointer Sisters, Celine Dion, Marc Anthony and others) and Ty Lacy (with songs for LeAnn Rimes, Faith Hill, Keith Urban, amongst others).

The song appears in Charvet's third and last album Se laisser quelque chose with Universal Music and his second single from the album, after the initial track "Je te dédie". The song released by Mercury Records and distributed by Universal Music charted in SNEP, the official French singles chart and in Belgium's Ultratip French singles chart.

== Track list ==
Pre-release (1 May 2006)

1. "Sometimes It Rains" (radio edit) (3:31)

Mercury release (physical, 3 July 2006)

1. "Sometimes It Rains" (written by Arnie Roman, Ty Lacy) (4:17)
2. "Damn Shame" (written by David Charvet, Peter Vettese) (3:39)

== Music video ==
A music video was also shot for the single by French director Fabrice Begotti (HappyShooting). The music video shows a soulful Charvet waking at home, taking a morning shower, checking his diary for a certain engagement he takes note of and then going out. On his way, Charvet buys a bouquet of flowers from a street vendor, while heads turn as he walks down the road with eligible women desiring to get his attention and company and he trying to ignore them. Instead, he proceeds to take an almost empty bus, except for a young girl and her mother as makes funny gestures to win her heart. He also notices an apprehensive young man who jumps off the bus to meet an enlisted soldier friend. Eventually Charvet reaches his destination, a cemetery, where he lays the flowers he bought on the tombstone of a fallen relative, that identifies a PFC ("private first class) laid there who had served in World War II. The music video fades away with a message on a black screen that says "in memory of Fifi and Lucette".

== Credits ==
Vocals

- Lead vocals – David Charvet
- Backing vocals [Chorus] – Claire Worrall, Cyril Paulus, Steve Mc Ewan, Tim Van Der Kuil, William Rousseau

Strings

- Conductor [strings] and arranged by [strings] – Nick Ingman
- Leader [strings] – Gavin Wright
- Strings – The London Session Orchestra

Other instruments

- Acoustic guitar – Phil Palmer, Serge Faubert, Steve Power, Tim Van Der Kuil
- Bass – David Catlin-Birch, Mick Feat, Phil Spalding
- Drums – Damon Wilson, Jeremy Stacey
- Electric guitar – Serge Faubert, Tim Van Der Kuil
- Harmonica – Mark Feltham
- Piano, keyboards – Claire Worrall

Production

- Engineer [assistant] – Dan Porter, Sam Miller, Tim Roe
- Engineer [pro tools] – James Brumby*
- Executive producer – Sandrine Lebars
- Producer [artistic direction] – Gérard Beullac
- Producer, recorded by, mixed by – Steve Power
- Programmed by – Matt Vaughan, Richard Robson
- Recorded and mixed at Sanctuary Townhouse Studios, London.
- Photography by – David Elofer, Frédérique Veysset

== Charts ==
The single stayed 8 weeks on the French chart.

Chart (2012)	Peak position	Weeks in chart
Ultratip Belgian Singles Chart (Wallonia)	11	
SNEP French Singles Chart	52	8w
