= Prisoners of the Sun (film) =

- Film poster
- Directed by: Roger Christian
- Written by: Peter Atkins; Anthony Hickox
- Produced by: Philipp Knauss; Matthias Drescher
- Starring: John Rhys-Davies; David Charvet; Carmen Chaplin; Emily Holmes; Nick Moran; Joss Ackland; Michael Higgs; Gulshan Grover; Shane Richie
- Cinematography: Ed Wild
- Edited by: Valerie Haaf
- Music by: Maarten Buning
- Production companies: MEC; Cinemakers; LUXX Studios
- Distributed by: Miromar Entertainment
- Release date: 12 December 2013 (United Kingdom)
- Running time: 88 minutes
- Countries: United Kingdom; France
- Language: English
- Budget: $17 million

Prisoners of the Sun is a 2013 adventure horror film directed by Roger Christian starring John Rhys-Davies, David Charvet, Carmen Chaplin, Emily Holmes, Nick Moran, Joss Ackland, Michael Higgs, Gulshan Grover and Shane Richie.

== Plot ==
A young archaeological apprentice named Doug Adler (David Charvet) is dragged into a perilous expedition deep beneath the timeless sands of Egypt. He and a group of others encounter ancient monsters and escape death traps, but through the expedition, they discover a secret older than time and a danger beyond imagination. However, the "sleepers" have awoken, the gods have risen and the countdown to the end of the world has begun. The Voyagers must find a way to stop the mummy named Al Khem Ayut (Cedric Proust) and escape from the pyramid before time runs out.

== Cast ==
Actor	Role
John Rhys-Davies	Prof. Hayden Masterton
David Charvet	Doug Adler
Carmen Chaplin	Sarah Masterton
Emily Holmes	Claire Becket
Nick Moran	Adam Prime
Joss Ackland	Prof. Mendella
Michael Higgs	Peter Levitz
Gulshan Grover	Rohit
Shane Richie	Kalfhani
Katherine Heath	Jemila
Ahmed Boulane	Pharao consort
Cedric Proust	Al Khem Ayut Mummy
Isabella Orlowska	Heather
Edy Arellano	Sahid

== Release ==
The film was released on DVD by Phase 4 Films on 8 July 2014.
