= For What It's Worth (Stevie Nicks song) =

Single by Stevie Nicks

from the album In Your Dreams
- Released: July 11, 2011
- Recorded: 2010
- Genre: Folk rock
- Length: 4:32
- Label: Reprise
- Songwriters: Stevie Nicks, Mike Campbell
- Producer: David A. Stewart

Stevie Nicks singles chronology
"Secret Love" (2011)	"For What It's Worth" (2011)	"The Dealer" (2014)

"For What It's Worth" is the second single from Stevie Nicks' 2011 album In Your Dreams. The song was released to radio on July 11, 2011 and debuted at No. 25 on the Billboard Adult Contemporary chart during the week of September 19, 2011.

== Background and composition ==
Nicks wrote the song in Napili, Hawaii on May 27, 2010. When writing the song, Nicks had all of her recording equipment sent to Hawaii to aid her in writing for her In Your Dreams album. The idea for the song came from Nicks' 1994 tour Street Angel Tour when she chose to travel by bus. She described herself as emotionally fragile and unprepared for such a major tour while newly sober and out of rehab. She describes the journey became meaningful because a companion on that tour, rumored to be drummer Dallas Taylor, provided comfort and support, helping her cope and "saving her life" during this time. The music video pays homage to this experience.

All songs from the album were recorded in Nicks' home in Los Angeles, California. She stated recording this album was the most fun she had recording since Fleetwood Mac's 1975 self-titled album. She often states that her time recording with the albums producer, Dave Stewart, was the best year of her life.

== Track listing ==
1. "For What It's Worth" (edit) (Nicks, Campbell) — 4:03
2. "For What It's Worth" (album version) (Nicks, Campbell) — 4:31

== Music video ==
The music video for the single was released on August 24, 2011. It features Nicks, Mike Campbell, and David A. Stewart riding Nicks' tour bus in the desert.

== Live performances ==
Nicks appeared on America's Got Talent on July 27, 2011, making the televised debut of "For What It's Worth" as well as performing her song "Edge of Seventeen". She also performed the single on The Tonight Show with Jay Leno on July 28. On August 26, 2011, Nicks performed "For What It's Worth", "Landslide", and "Rhiannon" on Good Morning America as part of its Summer Concert Series.

== Charts ==
Chart (2011)	Peak position
US Billboard Adult Contemporary	25
