= Robert Farrell Smith =

American novelist

- Born: 1970 (age 55–56); United States
- Occupation: Novelist
- Spouse: Krista
- Children: 3
- Writing career
- Pen name: Obert Skye
- Years active: 1996-present
- Genres: Comedy, fantasy
- Notable work: Leven Thumps

Robert Farrell Smith (born 1970) is an American humor writer. Starting in 2005, he publishes children's books under the pseudonym Obert Skye. He is known for the Leven Thumps series, the Pillage trilogy, and The Creature from My Closet series. He is also the author of Witherwood Reform School and Beyond Foo series, along with A Wizard for Hire trilogy.

== Personal life ==
Robert Farrell Smith was born in 1970. For a short time, he lived on the Isle of Skye as a candy-taster, giving him inspiration for his pseudonym Obert Skye along with his first name. He now lives in Mesa, Arizona with his wife Krista and his three children. In 2010, he went to over 900 schools in the United States as part of his "Imagination Tour". During this tour he emphasized the importance and power of imagination.

== Publications ==
Smith began publishing books in 1996. Starting in 2005, he has published his books under the pseudonym Obert Skye.

- Baptists at Our Barbecue (1996)
- The Miracle of Forgetness (1997)
- All is Swell: Trust in Thelma's Way (1999)
- Falling for Grace: Trust at the End of the World (1999)
- Love's Labors Tossed: Trust and the Final Fling (2000)
- Captain Matrimony (2001)
- For Time and All Absurdity (2002)
- Never Can Say Good-Bye (2003)

=== Leven Thumps series ===
- Leven Thumps and the Gateway to Foo (2005)
- Leven Thumps and the Whispered Secret (2006)
- Leven Thumps and the Eyes of the Want (2007)
- Leven Thumps and the Wrath of Ezra (2008)
- Leven Thumps and the Ruins of Alder (2009)
- Professor Winsnicker's Book of Proper Etiquette for Well-Mannered Sycophants (2007)

=== The Creature From My Closet series ===
- Wonkenstein (2011)
- Potterwookie (2012)
- Pinocula (2013)
- Katfish (2014)
- Lord of the Hat (2015)
- Batneezer (2016)

=== Pillage trilogy ===
- Pillage (2008)
- Choke (2010)
- Ambush (2012)
- Pillagy: The Complete Trilogy (2013)

=== Beyond Foo series ===
- Geth and the Return of the Lithens (2011)
- Geth and the Deception of Dreams (2012)

=== Witherwood Reform School series ===
- Witherwood Reform School (2015)
- Lost and Found (2016)

=== Geeked Out series ===
- Geeked Out (2018)
- Bigger, Badder, Nerdier (2019)

=== Mutant Bunny Island series ===
- Mutant Bunny Island (2017)
- Mutant Bunny Island #2: Bad Hare Day (2018)
- Mutant Bunny Island #3: Buns of Steel (2019)

=== Wizard For Hire series ===
- Wizard for Hire (2018)
- Apprentice Needed (2019)
- Magic Required (2020)

== Movies ==
- Baptists at Our Barbecue (2004), co-producer with Ferrell Matthew Smith (Robert Farrel's brother) and Christian Vuissa
