= The Errand of Angels =

- Theatrical release poster
- Directed by: Christian Vuissa
- Written by: Heidi Johnson (story); Christian Vuissa (screenplay)
- Produced by: Christian Vuissa
- Starring: Erin Chambers; Rachel Emmers; Ashley Munns; Vlasto Peyitch; Bettina Schwarz
- Cinematography: Brian Wilcox
- Music by: Robert Allen Elliott
- Distributed by: Excel Entertainment Group
- Release date: August 22, 2008
- Running time: 91 min
- Country: United States
- Language: English
- Budget: US$160,000 est
- Box office: $195,184

The Errand of Angels is a 2008 American LDS cinema drama film directed and produced by Christian Vuissa, who also wrote the screenplay. Starring Erin Chambers, Rachel Emmers and Bettina Schwarz, the film is based on the experiences of Heidi Johnson while working as a missionary in Austria for the Church of Jesus Christ of Latter-day Saints.

== Plot ==
Sister Rachel Taylor (Erin Chambers) of Boise, Idaho is an eager young missionary of the LDS Church who has been sent on an 18-month-long mission to Austria. Rachel finds herself having a hard time adjusting to her new cultural surroundings in the foreign country. Due to differences in opinion, she is also unable to get along with the companion missionary that was assigned to her by the church. Taking a note from the very teachings she is trying to spread, Rachel eventually learns to accept others' differences and get along peacefully with her companions even if they disagree on how to go about conducting the work for which they volunteered.

== Reception ==
=== Release and box office performance ===
The Errand of Angels was screened at several locations before its theatrical release, starting on January 1, 2008. This included a screening at the Gloria Film Festival in West Valley City, Utah on July 31, 2008. The film was released theatrically on August 22 to a limited number of theatres. Filmed on an estimated budget of US$160,000, The Errand of Angels was in theatrical release until October 10, 2008 during which time it earned $195,184.

The film was released on DVD on December 2, 2008 for Region 1. It was also shown on Brigham Young University's BYU Television channel on Thanksgiving Day in 2008.

=== Critical response ===
Film critic Jeff Vice of the Salt Lake City-based Deseret News awarded The Errand of Angels two and a half stars in his review of the film. Vice praised the film as being "one of the more earnest and well-intentioned movies in recent memory" while, at the same, faulting it for being "preachy" and "a little talky and a little dry as a result". Vice compared The Errand of Angels to The Best Two Years finding them similar in story and structure although believing that the former would be better had it contained some of the humor and light-heartedness found in the latter.

Richard Propes of The Independent Critic called the film an "insightful, touching and funny story" and he commended the director claiming that "Vuissa paints a richly human portrait of Sister Taylor". The film also received a very positive review in BYU Studies Quarterly which almost never reviews any films.

== Soundtrack ==
The Errand of Angels

Soundtrack album by Robert Allen Elliott
- Released: September 5, 2008
- Length: 43:45
- Label: Mirror Films

The Errand of Angels Soundtrack is the accompanying music album containing original music from the motion picture written and performed by Robert Allen Elliott. It was released on Mirror Films record label on September 5, 2008.

=== Track listing ===
1. "As Sisters in Zion" (featuring Tiffany Fronk) (2:57)
2. "Mission to Austria" (2:32)
3. "The Rules" (0:58)
4. "Goodbye Sonja" (0:52)
5. "She's Nice" (1:01)
6. "Resistance" (1:19)
7. "Answered Prayer" (2:35)
8. "Trying It Alone" (2:38)
9. "Before the Storm" (2:20)
10. "Salzburg" (1:00)
11. "A Good Missionary" (4:08)
12. "Hypocrite" (2:45)
13. "Entrusted to Her Care" (3:29)
14. "Back to Vienna" (4:03)
15. "Farewell to a Friend" (2:30)
16. "Rainy Day" (2:19)
17. "Baptism" (3:52)
18. "The Errand of Angels" (2:27)

== See also ==
- Cinema of the United States
- List of American films of 2008
