= Seduced and Betrayed =

- DVD cover
- Genre: Drama; Thriller
- Written by: Cameron Kent
- Directed by: Félix Enríquez Alcalá
- Starring: Susan Lucci; David Charvet; Mary Ellen Trainor; Gabrielle Carteris
- Music by: Mark Snow
- Country of origin: United States
- Original language: English

Production
- Executive producers: Robert M. Sertner; Frank von Zerneck
- Producers: Randy Sutter; Michael G. Larkin
- Production location: Phoenix, Arizona
- Cinematography: Kevin Kelley
- Editor: Michael Brown
- Running time: 87 minutes
- Production company: Von Zerneck Sertner Films

Original release
- Network: NBC
- Release: April 24, 1995

Seduced and Betrayed is a 1995 American television erotic thriller film starring Susan Lucci and David Charvet. Directed by Félix Enríquez Alcalá, it also features Mary Ellen Trainor and Gabrielle Carteris. The film debuted on April 24, 1995 on NBC.

== Plot ==
A wealthy, beautiful and dangerous widow in Phoenix refuses to take "no" for an answer as she draws a young married carpenter into a world of passion, deceit and betrayal, threatening to destroy him in the process. After hiring him to renovate her home, she quickly turns the arrangement into much more than just a construction job. As she manipulates the contractor, he finally gives in for one night of passion. Realizing what he has done, the younger man insists that he cannot continue the affair, but he soon finds that much more than his reputation is at stake.

== Cast ==
- Susan Lucci as Victoria Landers
- David Charvet as Dan Hiller
- Mary Ellen Trainor as Charlotte
- Gabrielle Carteris as Cheryl Hiller

== Reception ==
Seduced and Betrayed was panned by critic Kirk Nicewonger, who called it a "ludicrous waste of time" and labeled it a "ripoff" of Fatal Attraction.
