= The Hollow Point =

2016 crime thriller film by Gonzalo López-Gallego

- Theatrical release poster
- Directed by: Gonzalo López-Gallego
- Written by: Nils Lyew
- Produced by: Aaron L. Ginsburg; William Green; Andy Horwitz
- Starring: Patrick Wilson; Lynn Collins; Ian McShane; John Leguizamo; Jim Belushi; Michael Flynn
- Cinematography: José David Montero
- Edited by: Gonzalo López-Gallego
- Music by: Juan Navazo
- Production company: Atlas Independent
- Distributed by: Vertical Entertainment (United States); Relativity International (International)
- Release dates: May 6, 2016 (Bilbao Fantasy Film Festival); December 16, 2016 (United States)
- Running time: 97 minutes
- Country: United States
- Language: English

The Hollow Point is a 2016 American Western film directed by Gonzalo López-Gallego and written by Nils Lyew. The film stars Patrick Wilson, Lynn Collins, Ian McShane, John Leguizamo, Jim Belushi and Michael Flynn. The film was released on December 16, 2016, by Vertical Entertainment.

== Cast ==
- Patrick Wilson as Sheriff Wallace Skolin
- Lynn Collins as Marla
- Ian McShane as Sheriff Leland Kilbaught
- John Leguizamo as Atticus
- Jim Belushi as Shepard "Shep" Diaz
- Michael Flynn as Jesse
- Heather Beers as Ellie
- Nathan Stevens as Clive Mercy
- David Fernandez Jr. as Eugenio
- David H. Stevens as Ken Mercy
- Karli Hall as Lilly
- Derek Boone as Samuel "Sam" Gibbons
- Carl Hadra as Clay Kinston

== Release ==
The film was released on December 16, 2016, by Vertical Entertainment.
