= David Charvet =

French-American singer, actor, model and television personality (born 1972)

- Born: David Franck Charvet; 15 May 1972 (age 54); Lyon, France
- Occupations: Actor, singer, model, television personality
- Years active: 1992–present
- Notable work: Baywatch; Melrose Place
- Spouse: Brooke Burke (m. 2011; div. 2020)
- Children: 2
- Website: www.davidcharvet.com

David Franck Charvet (French pronunciation: [david ʃaʁve]; born 15 May 1972) is a French-American singer, actor, model, and television personality.

== Early life ==
Charvet was born and raised in Lyon, France, as David Franck Charvet on 15 May 1972, the son of Christiane Charvet Haddad and businessman Paul Guez, founder of the Sasson brand of jeans in the 1980s. He was raised in a Jewish household.

He won a green card through the Morrison visa lottery in the early 1990s. In 1999, he left acting to pursue a music career.

== Acting career ==
Charvet caught his big break in 1992 on the American television program Baywatch as Matt Brody. He remained on Baywatch for three full seasons until 1995. He appeared as Craig Field on Melrose Place from 1996–98. Between 1995–99, he appeared in Seduced and Betrayed, Derby, Angel Flight Down, and Meet Prince Charming. He left acting in 1999 to concentrate on his musical career.

In 2006, Charvet returned to acting in a movie directed by Roger Christian called Prisoners of the Sun, which was only completed and released in 2013. He portrayed athlete Cameron Day in the sports comedy-drama film Green Flash (2008) alongside Torrey DeVitto and Kristin Cavallari. In 2009, he took part in ABC's summer reality show The Superstars and came in third with his partner Lisa Leslie. In 2010, he was a contestant on the third season of the French reality television series La Ferme Célébrités, a French version of The Farm. The show was broadcast on TF1. Charvet was a runner-up in the show.

== Music career ==
After successful runs at Baywatch and Melrose Place in the 1990s, Charvet decided to return to France with a 5-album contract with Universal Music Group France. During a span of seven years, he released three pop rock studio albums with self-titled David Charvet in 1997, Leap of Faith in 2002, and Se laisser quelque chose in 2004. His materials catered to both English and French language listeners for a wider spectrum of audiences.

His debut single "Should I Leave", a bilingual hit in French and English, hit #3 in France and also charted in Belgium and Sweden. His bilingual hit "Jusqu'au bout"/"Leap of Faith" reached #6 in France, followed by the bilingual "Apprendre à aimer"/"Teach Me How to Love" that made it to the French Top 20 and was a hit in Belgium, Switzerland, and the Netherlands. Charvet has sold over 2.5 million albums.

== Interests ==
In June 2010, Charvet joined The Blue Seals, a non-profit organization aimed at providing a rapid response to environmental emergencies, focusing on ocean preservation, and is a member of its board of directors. It worked on raising awareness of the Deepwater Horizon oil spill, helping French company Ecoceane's ships designed to collect floating waste and hydrocarbons to take part in the cleanup.

== Personal life ==
After meeting on the set of Baywatch, Charvet dated co-star Pamela Anderson from 1992 to 1994. Charvet and Brooke Burke married on 12 August 2011; Brooke announced that she would take her husband's last name and be known as Brooke Burke-Charvet. They have two children together, daughter Heaven (b. 2007) and son Shaya (b. 2008), and are raising their children in the Jewish faith. Brooke already had two daughters from her first marriage to plastic surgeon Garth Fisher. In April 2018, the couple announced that they were divorcing after seven years of marriage. Their divorce was finalized in March 2020.

== Filmography ==
=== Film ===
| Year | Title | Role |
|---|---|---|
| 1999 | Meet Prince Charming | Jack Harris |
| 2008 | Green Flash | Cameron Day |
| 2013 | Prisoners of the Sun | Doug Adler |

=== Television ===
| Year | Title | Role | Notes |
|---|---|---|---|
| 1992–1996 | Baywatch | Matt Brody | Main role: Season 3–6; 70 episodes |
| 1994 | Harts of the West | Tad Miller | Episode: "You Got to Have Heart" |
| 1995 | Baywatch: Forbidden Paradise | Matt Brody | TV film |
| 1995 | Seduced and Betrayed | Dan Hiller | TV film |
| 1995 | Derby | Cass Sundstrom | TV film |
| 1996 | Angel Flight Down | Brad Brown | TV film |
| 1996–1998 | Melrose Place | Craig Field | Main role: Season 5–6; 46 episodes |
| 2009 | The Superstars | Himself | Contestant; 6 episodes |
| 2010 | La Ferme Célébrités | Himself | Contestant; 10 episodes |
| 2010 | The Perfect Teacher | Jim Wilkes | TV film |
| 2017 | The Apprentice | Himself | Model; Episode: "Candy for a Billionaire" |
| 2026 | Special Forces: World's Toughest Test | Himself | Contestant; Season 5 |

== Discography ==
=== Albums ===
| Year | Album | Peak positions | | | | | | Certifications |
| Year | Album | FR | AUT | BEL (Wa) | FIN | NED | SWI | Certifications |
|---|---|---|---|---|---|---|---|---|
| 1997 | David Charvet | 8 | – | 41 | – | – | – | FR: 1× Gold |
| 2002 | Leap of Faith | 21 | 43 | 19 | 21 | 98 | 52 | |
| 2004 | Se laisser quelque chose | 32 | – | 58 | – | – | – | |

=== Singles ===
| Year | Single | Peak positions | | | | | | | Certifications | Album |
| Year | Single | FR | BEL (Wa) | BEL (Wa) (Ultratop) | BEL (Wa) (Ultratip)* | NED | SWE | SWI | Certifications | Album |
|---|---|---|---|---|---|---|---|---|---|---|
| 1997 | "Should I Leave" | 3 | 12 | 16 | – | – | 48 | – | | David Charvet |
| 1997 | "Regarde-toi" | 28 | – | 14 | – | – | – | – | | David Charvet |
| 2002 | "Jusqu'au bout" / "Leap of Faith" | 6 | – | 17 | – | 15 | – | – | | Leap of Faith |
| 2002 | "Apprendre à aimer" / "Teach Me How to Love" | 13 | – | 32 | – | 88 | – | 48 | | Leap of Faith |
| 2003 | "Take You There" | 68 | – | – | 6* | – | – | – | | Leap of Faith |
| 2004 | "Je te dédie" | 12 | – | 13 | – | – | – | – | | Se laisser quelque chose |
| 2006 | "Sometimes It Rains" | 52 | – | – | 11* | – | – | – | | Se laisser quelque chose |
| 2010 | "Swim With the Birds" | – | – | – | – | – | – | – | | Non-album digital release |

*Did not appear in the official Belgian Ultratop 50 charts, but rather in the bubbling under Ultratip charts.
