= Leven Thumps and the Whispered Secret =

2006 novel by Obert Skye

- First edition cover
- Author: Obert Skye
- Cover artist: Ben Sowards
- Language: English
- Series: Leven Thumps
- Genre: Children's fantasy novel
- Publisher: Shadow Mountain
- Publication date: 2006
- Publication place: United States
- Media type: Print (paperback)
- Pages: 396
- Preceded by: Leven Thumps and the Gateway to Foo
- Followed by: Leven Thumps and the Eyes of The Want

The Whispered Secret, previously published as Leven Thumps and the Whispered Secret is a fantasy novel by Obert Skye that traces the journeys of Leven, a seemingly ordinary boy from Burnt Culvert, Oklahoma, and Winter Frore, a neglected girl, as they seek to bring Geth back to his former state.

== Plot introduction ==
After escaping a deranged dream-master and destroying the hidden gateway, Leven Thumps and his band of travelers must now journey across Foo and restore Geth from his shape as a toothpick to the rightful king he once was. But Foo is still in chaos, and Leven must overcome several adversaries and survive the Swollen Forest in order to save his friends and keep hope alive. As fate would have it, nothing goes as planned, and even Geth begins to wonder if they will succeed. Bad goes to worse as Leven digs up a long buried secret - one that stalks him, determined to whisper a truth that could be deadly in the wrong hands. Through it all, Leven finds the courage to do what is right and continues to discover an inner strength and a power he never thought possible.

== Characters ==
=== Leven Thumps ===
Leven is fourteen years old, and he is an offing. He is the grandson of Hector Thumps, who was the maker of the gateway between reality and Foo. Leven can manipulate the future with his offing gifts. Leven is often called Lev, and his eyes burn gold when he uses his gift. He has a patch of white hair, which his guardians said had come when he had been frightened out of his wits one night.

Lev had been born on October fifteenth, at 2:30 in the morning. His mother, Maria Thumps, died in childbirth, shortly after naming him. His father had died in a car accident a week before Leven had been born. As he lay as an orphan, the nurses and doctors had debated on what to do with him. Then his mother's half-sister, Addy Graph, came by to pick him up. She had been snappy and mean, and took him away. Even then, Clover had been with him.

His new parents wouldn't stand to hear Leven talk or fuss. So from when he was little, he had slept in an old bed at the back porch of their trailer house. He didn't really care, though. He enjoyed counting stars and tracing long branches of the tree that was Geth. Since Addy had been terrified of Leven's possible friends coming to steal from her, Leven had been forbidden to hang around with other kids, so he had been alone for a long time - until he met Clover, which was the first domino in a set of dominoes that were adventures in his life. Then he met the love, and best friend of his life, Winter. They later realized their true destiny in the world.

=== Winter Frore ===
Winter is a nit, which means she has a special talent (the talent of freezing things). She was born in Reality, but when she was young, she was accidentally sent to Foo. Later, she was spirited away to Earth by Amelia. She had remembered Foo before, but had forgotten it, only to have it remain dormant in her mind. She has pale skin, white-blond hair and deep green eyes. Winter's given name is actually Judy.

Before she had been born, Winter's father had left months ago, and her mother wasn't exactly overjoyed with her child. Her adoptive mother, Janet, wasn't exactly the parenting type, either. She had smiled twice in her life, and was bitter most of the time. Her adoptive mother was terribly cruel, and Winter was stuck living with her. She usually spent her time in the library, having no friends.

The only light in her dim life was a family called the Tuttles. They lived in a small, ramshackle house two blocks away from Winter and Janet. Tim Tuttle was a garbage man, and Wendy Tuttle was a kind woman, with two boys, Darcy and Rochester, who were eight and six. They were the only happiness in Winter's life. However, Janet did not approve of her going over to their house, so she had forbidden those visits, but Winter sneaked out and still visited.

On her thirteenth birthday, Winter realized her talent, and later set upon a journey. She runs away with Leven, Geth, and Clover to the mystical world of Foo. She also has a burning love for Leven that is thoroughly recognized when they accidentally let a longing lose.

=== Geth ===
Geth is the rightful ruler of Foo. His soul was placed into a seed of a Fantrum tree by Sabine and was left for the birds, but Antsel rescued him and took him to our world. He is a lithen, meaning he believes Fate will decide everything. Currently, he is in the shape of a toothpick, but at the end of the book, he is taken to the Fire of Turrets where he is restored to his powerful self. Geth is very wise and is rarely afraid because he is a lithen. He was formed into a toothpick after the seed he was in grew into a tree, and was cut down by Leven Thumps "father". However half of Geth's soul went into another toothpick named Ezra. The part of Geth that is not connected to rest of itself is his anger, which means that Ezra is one confused, angry, little toothpick.

=== Sabine ===
The darkest and most evil being in Foo. He is the antagonist of the book. He, as well as Winter, are Niteons, or Nits as they are more commonly called. Both of them have the same power, the ability to freeze objects and people. In the book one, Sabine was blown into little bits and pieces, with one half in Foo and the other in Reality. In this form Sabine no longer has the ability to freeze things like Winter.

=== Clover Ernest ===
Clover is a wise-cracking sycophant from Foo, sent to look after Leven, who is his burn. He constantly tries to find a nickname for Leven (many of which include Chief and Big Man), as Winter calls Leven or Lev. Clover has the power to over shadow other people, and as a sycophant there is only one way that he can die, but only the sycophants know what that is. At the end of the book, however, Leven is told a secret that may be the key to killing sycophants. Sycophants wear silver robes at all times, this gives them the power to turn invisible when the hood is pulled up. In this hood they also have one pocket, but this pocket is like a void. It continues to amaze Leven every time Clover pulls more and more things out of this "void".

=== Jamoon ===
Jamoon is a rant who is one of Sabine's minions. He became the main villain of the story as some particles of Sabine were eaten by birds which soon died and yet still lived on. Jamoon's minions cannot be killed and are determined to do Jamoon's command.

=== Tim Tuttle ===
Tim Tuttle was at one point Winter's neighbor. He has cared for her over the years. Once she goes missing, he searches for her. When he goes to the rude mother, she acts like she doesn't care.

=== Dennis Wood ===
He just happened to have one messed up life, yet he runs into Geth's evil half, Ezra. He travels to find the gateway to Foo. Along the way he runs into the evil remnants of what used to be Sabine.

=== Ezra ===
Tatum Company cut Geth's soul in half, and so his angry evil side was transferred into another toothpick. Ezra seduced Dennis into working for him, but Ezra is using him. He lives to kill Geth. Ezra is a long, fancy toothpick used to hold sandwiches together. He has a purple frill on his head and only one eye.

== Glossary ==
=== Lithen ===
Lithens are the original inhabitants of Foo. They were placed there by the guiding force of Foo, fate. Their mission is to preserve the real Foo, and its place as a modifier of dreams. They are extremely honest and are believed to be incorruptible. The most prominent lithen is Geth. They live by fate, and are afraid of almost nothing.

=== Niteon ===
Nits are also called niteons. They are humans who had been on Earth and brought to Foo. They are the working class of Foo. They are stable, and one of the best dream enhancers. After they arrive in Foo, they are given a powerful gift. For example, many nits can control ice or levitate. Winter Frore and Sabine are examples of nits, and they both can control ice.

The entire list of Nit powers are as follows:

- See through soil
- Super speed
- Freeze things
- Breathe fire
- Levitate objects
- Burrow
- See through stone
- Shrink
- Throw lightning
- Push and bind dreams
- Fly
- Fade in and out

=== Offing ===
Offings are rare and extremely powerful. They can see and manipulate the future, such as Leven Thumps had. They can also learn other gifts. As a result, they are the most trusted confidante of the Want. They grow through experience, not time.

=== Rant ===
Rants are offspring from nits, that were born with too little character to manipulate dreams successfully. They are frequently in a disarray. As dreams catch them, half of their bodies become the imagination of what the one in reality is dreaming of. They are usually dressed in long robes to hide their unstable forms. Jamoon is an example of a rant.

=== Sycophant ===
Sycophants are assigned to those who step into Foo. They help those that come in to adjust and understand the ways. Their entire lives are spent serving their people, called their burns. There is only one way for sycophants to die, but only the sycophants know, until the secret finds Leven and tells him how. Clover is a sycophant.

Sycophants love to serve, but sometimes get sick of helping others. They are equipped with a venom that knocks out their victims immediately, and the victims are put in a trance where they are shown scenes depicting how wonderful sycophants are.

=== The Want ===
The Want is the invisible, but felt sage of Foo. He lives on the island of Lith, and sees every dream that comes in. He is prophetic, but a bit insane from his visions.

=== Cog ===
Cogs are ungifted children of nits. They have no single talent, but they can manipulate and enhance dreams.

=== Whisp ===
When those from Earth step on a partial way to get to Foo, they don't get there completely. They only partially arrive, since their bodies and souls stay on Earth feeling like they are missing something. They are called whisps, and are similar to ghosts. They are members of governing councils and boards. They are very vulnerable to flattery, and wish most for soul stones, to become whole.
