= Christian Vuissa =

Latter-day Saint filmmaker

Christian Vuissa (born 1969 in Bregenz, Austria) is a Latter-day Saint filmmaker. He is also the founder and former head of the LDS Film Festival, until 2017.

Vuissa served an LDS mission in Leipzig, Germany, from 1994 to 1996. He was involved in the making of Pirates of the Great Salt Lake. He was the director of Baptists at Our Barbecue, The Errand of Angels, One Good Man (2009) (originally called Father in Israel), The Letter Writer (2011), The Reunion (2008), and Silent Night (2012).

Vuissa was also the original story creator and the director of the 2002 short drama film Roots and Wings about Mexican immigrants to the United States.

Vuissa is a 2002 graduate of Brigham Young University's Media Arts program.

== Filmography ==
Year	Film	Credits		
Year	Film	Director	Writer	Producer
2002	Roots & Wings	Yes	Yes	Yes
2004	Unfolding	Yes	Yes	Yes
2004	Baptists at Our Barbecue	Yes	Yes	Yes
2006	Pirates of the Great Salt Lake	No	No	Yes
2006	The Letter Writer	Yes	Yes	Yes
2007	Wrinkles	No	No	Yes
2007	Repressed Melodies	No	No	Yes
2008	The Errand of Angels	Yes	Yes	Yes
2008	Through the Valley	No	Yes	Yes
2008	Crossroads	Yes	Yes	Yes
2008	The Abyss	Yes	Yes	Yes
2008	The Reunion	Yes	Yes	Yes
2008	One Lucky Boy	No	No	Yes
2009	Father in Israel	Yes	Yes	Yes
2010	I Love You Bernie Summersby	No	Yes	Yes
2010	Farewell to Brotherhood	Yes	Yes	Yes
2011	Joseph Smith: Plates of Gold	Yes	Yes	Yes
2012	Stille Nacht	Yes	Yes	Yes
