= Torrey DeVitto =

American actress (born 1984)

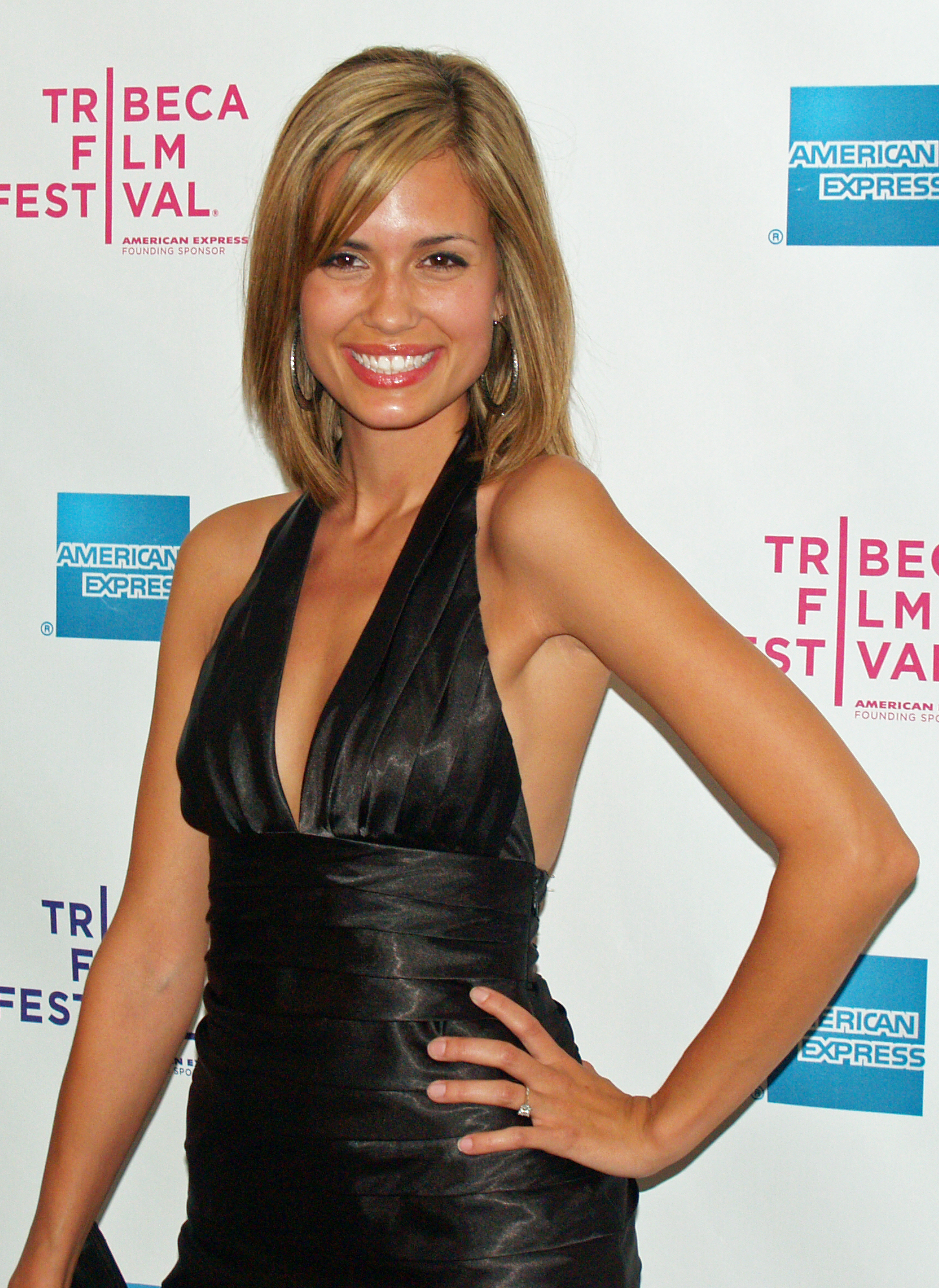
- DeVitto in 2008
- Born: June 8, 1984 (age 42); Huntington, New York, U.S.
- Occupations: Actress; model
- Years active: 1999–present
- Spouse(s): Paul Wesley (m. 2011; div. 2013) Jared LaPine (m. 2024)
- Children: 1
- Father: Liberty DeVitto

Torrey Joël DeVitto (born June 8, 1984) is an American actress, singer-songwriter, and former fashion model. Her first starring role was as Karen Kerr on the ABC Family drama series Beautiful People (2005–2006). She followed this up with recurring roles as Carrie in The CW drama series One Tree Hill (2008–2009), as Melissa Hastings in the ABC Family/Freeform mystery drama series Pretty Little Liars (2010–2017), and as Dr. Meredith Fell in The CW fantasy drama series The Vampire Diaries (2012–2013). DeVitto went on to star as Maggie Hall in the final season of Lifetime's drama series Army Wives (2013) and as Dr. Natalie Manning in the NBC medical drama series Chicago Med (2015–2021).

== Early life ==
Torrey Joel DeVitto was born and raised in Huntington on Long Island, New York, and Winter Park, Florida. Her parents are Mary and Liberty DeVitto; her father was a long-time drummer for Billy Joel. They met in 1983. DeVitto is of Italian descent, her paternal grandmother is from Naples while her paternal grandfather is from Sicily.

As a child, DeVitto spent a lot of time touring with her parents. She described her childhood to CVLUX magazine by saying: "We spent every Thanksgiving at Billy Joel's house. I grew up with his daughter, Alexa; it was a lot of warm, happy memories." Her mother Mary had been Stevie Nicks's best friend since the late 1970s and met Liberty when he was the drummer on Stevie's Wild Heart Tour. On the day of her birth, Joel was performing at the Wembley Arena and made a special note before beginning "The Longest Time" that DeVitto's wife was having a baby, causing a standing ovation for DeVitto, who was playing the drums at the concert. She was named Torrey after her mother's maiden name. She has two sisters, Devon and Maryelle. Her sister Maryelle was in the TV series Endurance.

DeVitto attended Fort Salonga Elementary School, part of Kings Park Central School District. She began taking violin lessons at age six and by the fourth grade, she was playing with the local high school orchestra. When DeVitto was 12 years old, she played a solo violin piece at Christie Brinkley and Peter Cook's wedding. She played in the Florida Symphony Youth Orchestra (1995–1997) and in the Florida Youth Artist Orchestra (1998–1999). She attended Youngsville Elementary School, part of Kings Park Central School District. She studied dance with the Kings Park Dance Center in New York and took acting classes at Zoe & Company in Orlando, Florida. After graduating from Winter Park High School in Winter Park, Florida, she spent her summer in Japan working as a model and had earlier spent time in Chicago.

== Career ==
=== 1990s ===
DeVitto's modeling career started at age 15, when she began appearing in commercials, which she described to be a stepping stone to get to TV and film jobs. She was signed to Ford and Avenue One modeling agencies. Staying true to her love of music in 2002, she played violin with the Tommy Davidson Band at the Sunset Room in Hollywood. She also played violin on Raphael Saadiq's 2004 album, Ray Ray, as well as Stevie Nicks' 2011 album In Your Dreams.

=== 2000s ===
DeVitto landed her first acting role in 1999 when she participated in The WB drama series Safe Harbor. In 2000, she appeared in the Nickelodeon comedy series Noah Knows Best. In 2002, she landed a lead role in playwright Lee Blessing's play Eleemosynary, which was performed at the Orlando Shakespeare Theater. Her performance received praise and positive reviews in the Orlando Sentinel. DeVitto co-starred in the ABC Family drama series Beautiful People as aspiring model Karen Kerr from 2005 to 2006. DeVitto made her film debut in the dramatic short film Starcrossed (2005), which concerns two brothers who develop a sexual attraction to one another. She also appeared in the horror film sequel I'll Always Know What You Did Last Summer (2006) as Zoe Warner. She guest-starred on Drake & Josh, Scrubs, Jack & Bobby and had a small part in the romantic drama short film Forbidden Love.

She had a lead role as an actress Sierra Young in the comedy film Heber Holiday (2007) and co-starred in the comedy-drama film Green Flash (2008) alongside David Charvet and Kristin Cavallari. DeVitto appeared in the horror comedy film Killer Movie (2008) with then-boyfriend Paul Wesley, Kaley Cuoco and Leighton Meester. From 2008 to 2009, DeVitto had a recurring role in the fifth and sixth seasons of The CW drama series One Tree Hill, where she played nanny Carrie. In 2013, DeVitto told Entertainment Tonight that her role as Carrie garnered strong reactions from the show's viewers and she often gets approached by fans about One Tree Hill.

=== 2010s ===
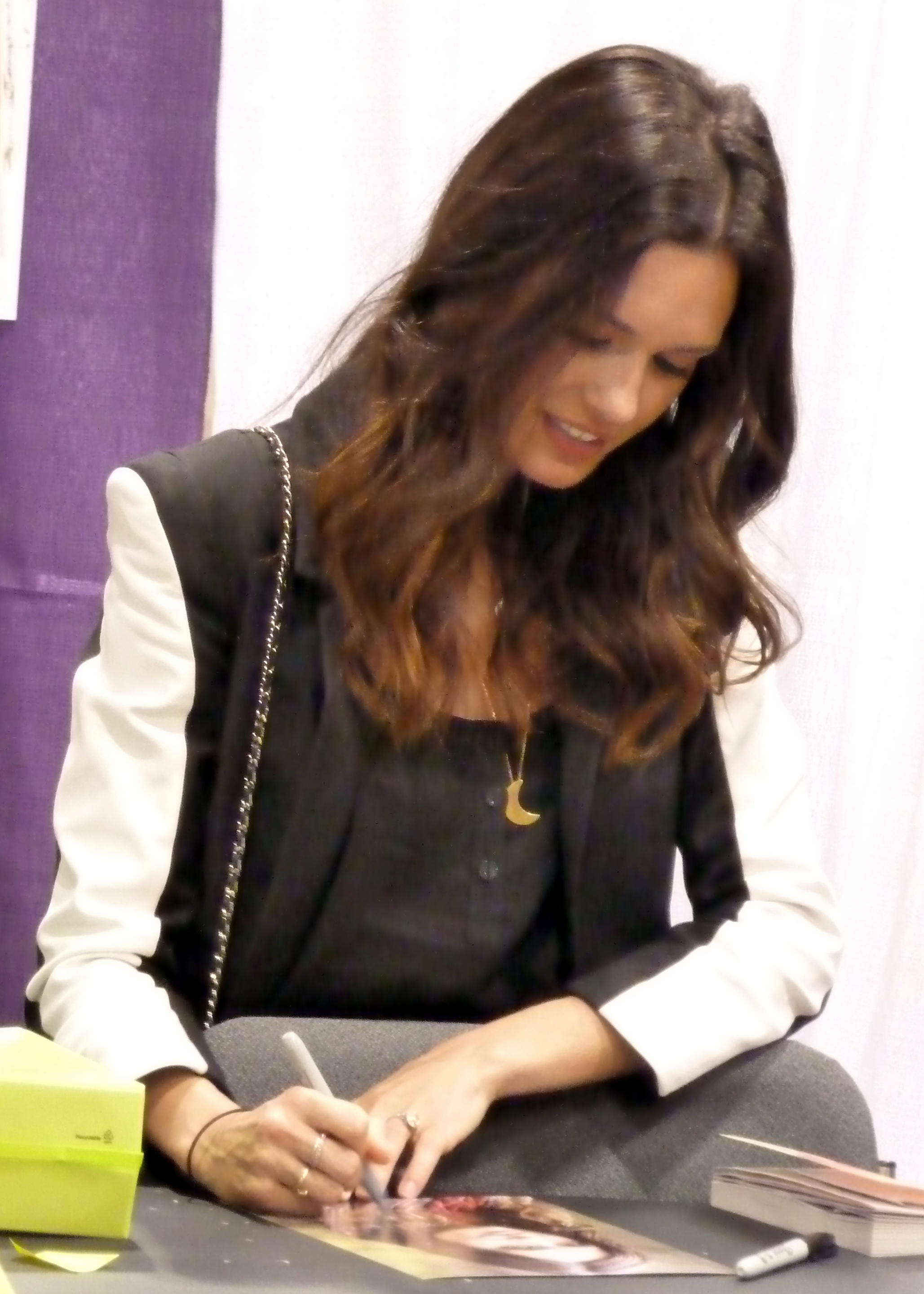
DeVitto signing autographs at Wizard World Toronto in 2012

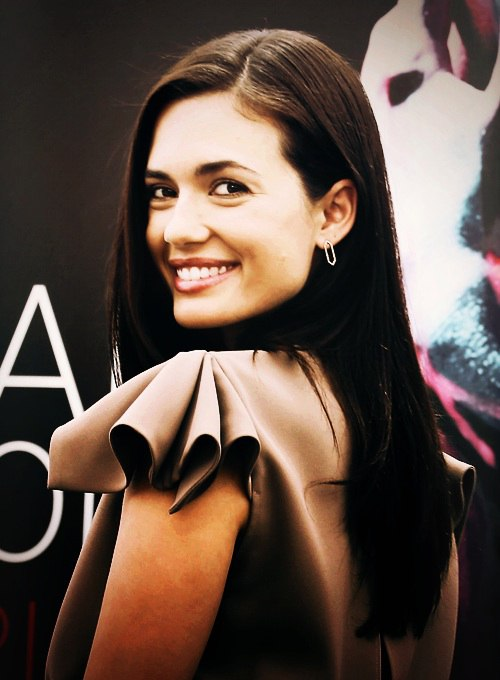
DeVitto at the 2016 Monte-Carlo Television Festival

DeVitto appeared in Will.I.Am's Vote Obama video "We Are The Ones" (2008) and Stevie Nicks' music video for the song "Moonlight" (2011). In 2010, DeVitto began a recurring role as Melissa Hastings in the ABC Family mystery drama series Pretty Little Liars based on Sara Shepard's book series of the same name. In 2017, Samantha Simon of InStyle wrote that "for Torrey DeVitto, playing super-sketchy Melissa Hastings on Pretty Little Liars wasn't exactly a challenge. Because, despite the seemingly endless web of lies surrounding the eldest Hastings sister on the show, it all looks like child's play compared to DeVitto's other unforgettable role as psychotic Nanny Carrie on One Tree Hill." She played Nina in the horror film The Rite (2011) alongside Anthony Hopkins, Alice Braga and Colin O'Donoghue. It received favorable reviews from critics and grossed over $97 million at the worldwide box office.

In November 2011, DeVitto was confirmed to have a recurring role in The CW fantasy drama series The Vampire Diaries as Dr. Meredith Fell, who is fascinated by Alaric Saltzman (Matthew Davis), when she notices how quickly he recovers from an injury. She portrayed Margo in the comedy-drama film Cheesecake Casserole (2012), released on July 3, 2012. In November 2012, it was reported that she had signed on to star as Maggie Hall in the seventh season of the Lifetime drama series Army Wives. Maggie Hall is a mother of two and former soldier who moves to Fort Marshall with her family. On September 24, 2013, Lifetime announced the show's cancellation, it honored the show with a two-hour retrospective special with the cast members which aired in 2014. She had a lead role as Jennie Stanton in the Hallmark Channel television film Best Christmas Party Ever in 2014.

In August 2015, DeVitto signed on to star in the NBC medical drama series Chicago Med. She was cast as Dr. Natalie Manning, the ED pediatrician. She has also appeared as Dr. Natalie Manning in Chicago P.D. and Chicago Fire. DeVitto's character exited the show after six years in the season 6 finale. "All good things must come to an end. It has been such an honor and pure joy to bring Dr. Natalie Manning to life for all of you on Chicago Med for the past 6 seasons. But it is now time for me and her to bow out and say goodbye," she wrote on Instagram.

She portrayed Angie in the psychological thriller The Hoaxing (2018), a short film that she also helped produce. In 2019, she started producing a documentary film, Saving Daisy that follows Daisy Coleman's journey of healing from lifelong trauma and PTSD. She starred in Hallmark Channel's television film Write Before Christmas (2019) alongside Chad Michael Murray. The film centers around Jessica, portrayed by DeVitto, who sends Christmas cards to five people who have impacted her life. The New York Times placed the film on its list of "Five Holiday Movies Worth Bingeing This Season".

=== 2020s ===
She played Cathy in the thriller film Divertimento (2020) alongside Kellan Lutz and Ola Rapace. The film won numerous awards, including "Best Ensemble" at the Seattle Film Festival in 2021. Shot in an 18th-century French castle, the film follows a chess player haunted by his tragic past, Jonas (Kellan Lutz), who is given an opportunity to participate in a mysterious game, Divertimento. Filmmaker Keyvan Sheikhalishahi wanted to create a film in which the six main characters each represent a chess piece.

On August 31, 2021, Deadline announced that DeVitto had joined the cast of Hallmark Movies & Mysteries film called The Christmas Promise alongside Dylan Bruce and Patrick Duffy. Production began in early September in Vancouver, Canada. In the film, DeVitto stars as Nicole, a woman dealing with grief with help from her grandfather and a carpenter she hires to help renovate her home. The film premiered on October 30, 2021, and aired again during Hallmark's popular countdown to Christmas. She played organic farmer Sarah in Hallmark Movies & Mysteries romantic time travel film, Rip in Time, which premiered on May 22, 2022.

== Style and social media presence ==
DeVitto's style has earned praise from periodicals such as Us Weekly. She was named one of Us Weekly's Most Stylish New Yorkers of 2018. DeVitto has been featured in several fashion blogs and magazines such as Cliché Magazine, Miami Living, Bello, CVLUX, Most Magazine, Crookes Magazine and Obscurae. She also modeled for TV Guide, That Magazine and Chicago Splash. She has frequently worn vegan fashion and her favorite vegan clothing is designed by Stella McCartney, Matt and Nat, Cri de Coeur, Bourgeois Boheme and Good Guys Don't Wear Leather.

DeVitto has developed an online and social media presence and endorses products such as beauty and wellness products on Instagram. She has partnered with several brands such as the FabFitFun beauty subscription box and Dickinson's Witch Hazel. She has used Instagram as a platform to raise awareness of current topics and her charitable causes such as sexual trafficking, hospices, racism and the Black Lives Matter movement. She encouraged her Instagram followers to vote in November 2022, writing: "Bans off our bodies! We do not vote for the sake of voting — we vote to elect leaders we can then hold accountable. Get out and Vote this November to continue the fight to protect abortion rights!"

== Philanthropy and activism ==
DeVitto dedicates much of her time to philanthropy and notably supports various charities. She has been A Hospice Ambassador for the National Hospice and Palliative Care Organization since 2011. In 2013, she received National Hospice Foundation's Buchwald Spirit Award for Public Awareness. While filming for television series Chicago Med in Chicago, she works with Rainbow Hospice. DeVitto has been particularly involved in hospice care, saying "The notion that 'No one dies alone' was so beautiful to me and one I knew I needed to be a part of. There is no difference to me helping those coming into this world and those going out. It is equally important and should be treated as such. End of life care is something I will always be involved with."

She has also dedicated her time to organizations including IMAlive, Kindred Foundation for Adoption, Elton John AIDS Foundation, Maddie's Fund and The Humane Society. She designed a shirt to raise money for suicide prevention organization IMAlive, which hosts a live online crisis chat. She hosted a screening of the Hospice Foundation's first documentary, Okuyamba, at UCLA's James Bridges Theatre in 2012. DeVitto was part of the Hospice Foundation's documentary film crew that spent three and a half weeks of filming in Uganda, Kenya and South Sudan. She is the narrator of the documentary film titled Road to Hope (2015) that follows palliative care nurses in Uganda and the challenges they face in bringing comfort to those in the country's remote villages.

An animal rights advocate, DeVitto has two rescued dogs, Beau and Homie, and partnered with the Shelter Pet Project to promote adoption. In 2016, she teamed up with HSUS and their Be Cruelty-Free campaign. She declared herself "vegan in my fashion and vegetarian in my food".

In other charitable endeavors, she performed with Erik Nye at the New Horizons Havana Nights Gala in April 2015. DeVitto has worked alongside the National Alliance on Mental Illness to raise awareness for Mental Health Month in May. She also joined NAMI to share her own story and the importance of living stigma-free of mental illnesses. She is a member of the Rape, Abuse & Incest National Network's National Leadership Council, a group of dedicated individuals who are committed to RAINN's mission of supporting survivors and ending sexual violence. In August 2019, DeVitto announced that she became an official board member of SafeBae. In 2020, she teamed up with The Tote Project to launch a "Free to Blossom x Torrey DeVitto Pouch," made from recycled saris by sex trafficking victims in India. Glamour placed it on its list of "35 Eco-Friendly Gifts That Do Right by Mother Earth." A portion of each sale was donated to SafeBae, which works to prevent sexual assault among teens. On November 18, 2021, DeVitto visited South Kingstown High School as part of a tour of several schools in Rhode Island on behalf of SafeBae. She talked to students about the dangers of sexual assault and held a presentation about sexual assault prevention.

List of charity products by Torrey DeVitto
Year	Title	Organization	Notes
2012	“Comfort. Love. Respect. Shirt"	National Hospice Foundation	T-shirt to celebrate the spirit of hospice and help raise awareness.
2016	"Gildan Ultra Cotton T-shirt"	IMAlive	Shirt to raise money for suicide prevention organization.
2020	"Free to Blossom x Torrey DeVitto Pouch"	The Tote Project	Pouch made of recycled saris by women who were sex trafficking victims in India.

== Personal life ==
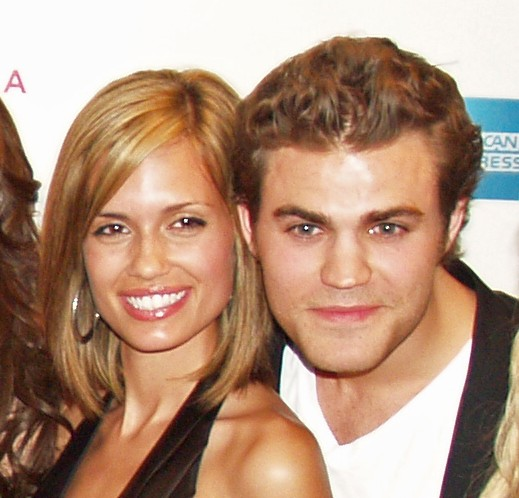
DeVitto and Paul Wesley in 2008

In 2007, DeVitto began dating her Killer Movie co-star Paul Wesley, whom she married in a private ceremony in April 2011. In July 2013, after two years of marriage, they filed for divorce which was finalized in December 2013.

DeVitto was in a two-year relationship with comedian Rick Glassman from 2014 to 2016. In August 2018, she officially confirmed her relationship with Chicago P.D. star Jesse Lee Soffer, after a year of dating. The pair announced the end of their relationship in May 2019. She dated Chicago Cubs manager David Ross from 2021 to early 2023.

In September 2023, she got engaged to director Jared LaPine. The pair married on September 14, 2024 in Pullman, Michigan. DeVitto gave birth to their first child, a daughter named Lyle-Josephine on November 21, 2024. She owns a 7.2-acre farm in Michigan.

In May 2022, DeVitto revealed that she had an abortion at age 21, saying, "I just started making money but with taxes and agent fees and manager fees, you don't really take home that much, and I didn't have the funds to do this. I was living in a house in Los Angeles with three other roommates and very scared, very confused, and so I made the decision that was best for me."

== Filmography ==
=== Film ===
Year	Title	Role	Notes
2005	Starcrossed	Maura	Short
2006	I'll Always Know What You Did Last Summer	Zoe Warner	
2007	Heber Holiday	Sierra Young	
2008	Killer Movie	Phoebe Hilldale	
2008	Green Flash	Mia Fonseca	
2011	The Rite	Nina	
2012	Cheesecake Casserole	Margo	
2013	Evidence	Leann Hoodplatt	
2015	Road to Hope	Narrator	Voice
2016	Stevie D	Daria Laurentis	
2016	Amy Makes Three	Carla Forrest	Unreleased
2020	Divertimento	Cathy	Short film
2021	Cold	Ashley	Also as executive producer
2024	Skelly	Mom	

=== Television ===
Year	Title	Role	Notes
2003	Dawson's Creek	Girl #1	Episode: "Lovelines"
2003	Scrubs	Gorgeous Girl with Dog	Episode: "My White Whale"
2004	Drake & Josh	Denise Woods	Episodes: "Driver's License"
2005	Drake & Josh	Tori	Episode: "Playing the Field"
2005	The King of Queens	Traci	Episode: "Cologne Ranger"
2005	Jack & Bobby	Tiffany	Episode: "Querida Grace"
2005–2006	Beautiful People	Karen Kerr	Main role
2006	Runaway	Soccer Coach	Episode: "End Game"; uncredited
2008	CSI: Miami	Kelly Chapman	Episode: "You May Now Kill the Bride"
2008–2009	One Tree Hill	Carrie	Recurring role
2009	Castle	Sierra Goodwin	Episode: "Inventing the Girl"
2010–2017	Pretty Little Liars	Melissa Hastings	Recurring role
2011	Marcy	Torrey	Episode: "Marcy Does Yoga"
2012	The Real St. Nick	Dr. Kate Bryant	Television film
2012–2013	The Vampire Diaries	Dr. Meredith Fell	Recurring role
2013	Army Wives	Maggie Hall	Main role
2014	CSI: Crime Scene Investigation	Susan McDowell / Kitty	Episode: "Kitty"
2014	Major Crimes	Nicole	Episode: "Acting Out"
2014	Stalker	Elaine	Episode: "Pilot"
2014	Best Christmas Party Ever	Jennie Stanton	Television film
2015	It Had To Be You	Darby Powell	Television film
2015–2021, 2023, 2025	Chicago Med	Dr. Natalie Manning	Main role (seasons 1–6); guest role (seasons 7, 8 & 11)
2016–2019	Chicago P.D.	Dr. Natalie Manning	Recurring role
2017–2020	Chicago Fire	Dr. Natalie Manning	4 episodes
2019	Write Before Christmas	Jessica Winthrop	Television film
2021	The Christmas Promise	Nicole Graham	Television film
2022	Rip in Time	Sarah	Television film
2022	Twas the Night Before Christmas	Madison Rush	Television film
2023	Love's Greek to Me	Ilana Elbaz	Television film
2026	Toast to Italy	Jenny Travalino	Television film

=== Music videos ===
Year	Title	Role	Artist
2008	"We Are the Ones"	—N/a	Will.i.am
2011	"Moonlight"	Violinist Vampire	Stevie Nicks
2013	Stevie Nicks: In Your Dreams	Violinist Vampire	Stevie Nicks

=== Podcasts ===
Year	Title	Role	Episode
2020	Pretty Little Wine Moms	Guest	"Know Your Frenemies"
2022	Outspoken Beauty	Guest	"Torrey DeVitto - My Beauty Habits"
2022	Drama Queens	Guest	"LIVE IN PHILLY! feat. Paul Johansson & Torrey DeVitto" and "LIVE IN PHILLY (Part 2) feat. Paul Johansson & Torrey DeVitto"
2022	Let It Out	Guest	"Actress Torrey DeVitto on Creative Gentleness, Managing Anxiety, Consent Education, Being of Service & More"
2022	The Ultimate Health Podcast	Guest	"This Diet & Lifestyle Helps Torrey DeVitto Manage Her Mental Health"
2022	Get Real with Caroline Hobby	Guest	"Torrey DeVitto: Top actress in shows like One Tree Hill, Chicago Med, & Pretty Little Liars tells her secrets for life learned from navigating Hollywood"
2023	Inside Scoop	Guest	"Spotlight Stress: Keeping Your Light High with Torrey DeVitto"

== Authored articles ==
- DeVitto, Torrey (April 14, 2022). "A Reclamation: why we Need to Bring Back the Flower Power." Elephant Journal.

== Awards and nominations ==
Year	Association	Category	Work	Result
2013	National Hospice Foundation	Buchwald Spirit Award for Public Awareness	Herself	Won
2016	Prestige Film Awards	Voice Over Talent	Road to Hope	Won
2020	Dublin International Short Film and Music Festival	Best Actress	Divertimento	Nominated
2020	Philadelphia Independent Film Festival	Best Actress	Divertimento	Nominated
2020	Queen Palm International Film Festival	Best Actress	Divertimento	Won
2021	Prison City Film Festival	Best Actress	Divertimento	Nominated
2021	Seattle Film Festival	Best Ensemble Short Film (shared with the cast)	Divertimento	Won
2021	Southern Shorts Awards	Best Actress – Award of Excellence	Divertimento	Won
2021	Southern Shorts Awards	Best Actress – Best of Show	Divertimento	Won
2022	Hang Onto Your Shorts Film Festival	Best Supporting Actress	Divertimento	Nominated
