= Eddy's World =

- Directed by: Lyn Goldfarb
- Produced by: Lyn Goldfarb; Jannat Gargi; Daniel Zimbaldi; Nancy Blachman (executive producer)
- Starring: Eddy Goldfarb
- Narrated by: Eddy Goldfarb
- Cinematography: Scott B
- Edited by: Seana Carroll
- Music by: Miriam Cutler
- Production company: Lyn Goldfarb Productions
- Distributed by: Lyn Goldfarb Productions
- Release date: 22 January 2020
- Running time: 18 minutes
- Country: United States
- Language: English
- Budget: $45,000

Eddy's World is a 2020 American documentary short film directed and produced by filmmaker Lyn Goldfarb, Eddy's daughter. Eddy's World was streamed on NewYorker.com. There are two versions of Eddy's World: an 18-minute version for festivals and streaming, and a 28-minute director's cut. Eddy’s World premiered at Mountainfilm Festival in May 2020.

== Premise ==
Eddy's World is about Eddy Goldfarb, the 98-year-old inventor of the Yakity Yak teeth and many other classic toys, including Kerplunk, Stompers, Vac-U-Form, and the Giant Bubble Gun. Goldfarb designed his first toys while serving in the United States Navy in WWII. In 1949, he sold his first toy and went on to invent over 800 toys over the next 70 years and garner over 300 patents. He now lives in a retirement community, still designing new toys in his garage machine shop.

== Awards ==
Eddy's World was licensed by the NewYorker.com; it received a 2022 Emmy nomination, Television Academy (Los Angeles area), and a 2021 Silver Telly Award.

- 2022 Independent Programming, The Television Academy
- 2022 Jury Award, Best Documentary Short, Vero Beach Film Festival
- 2022 Best Short Documentary, ABQ Indie Film Festiva
- 2022 Robinson Shorts Finalist, Robinson International Short Film Festival
- 2021 Grand Jury Prize, Joyce Forum Jewish Film Festival
- 2021 Best Short Documentary, Port Townsend Film Festival
- 2021 Runner Up, Best Documentary Short, Woods Hole Film Festival
- 2020 Jury Award, Raw Science Film Festival. https://www.rawsciencefilmfestival.com/2020-films
- 2020 Finalist, CanadaShorts Film Festival https://canadashorts.com/2020.php
- 2020 Films With Class Shorts, RiverRun International Film Festival

Eddy's World was an official selection of more than 35 film festivals, including the 2020 Florida Film Festival, the Hot Springs Documentary Film Festival, and the San Francisco Jewish Film Festival.
