= Barbie (1984 video game) =

1984 video game

- Developer: Eddy Goldfarb & Associates
- Publisher: Epyx
- Composer: Bob Vieira
- Series: Barbie
- Platform: Commodore 64
- Release: NA: 1984
- Genre: Simulation
- Mode: Single-player

Barbie is a 1984 video game for the Commodore 64 published by Epyx. It is a simulation game in which players help the Mattel doll Barbie dress up to go on dates with Ken by visiting boutique stores and selecting clothes and accessories. The game was the first licensed software depicting the doll, and was marketed by San Francisco publisher Epyx alongside a series of titles labelled Computer Activity Toys, which were the first series of toy-licensed titles to be published for computer software. The game also notably uses speech samples, which were uncommon in Commodore software at the time. Upon release, Barbie was not commercially successful, which the publisher attributed to limited funds and support for marketing and advertising. The game received mixed reviews, with critics praising the game's visual design and use of speech, but critiquing the limited gameplay options and considering the game was consumerist and sexist in nature.

== Gameplay ==
Barbie answers a call from Ken at 1 o'clock in the afternoon, asking to go out on a date.

The objective of the game is for players, assuming the role of Barbie, to prepare and attend dates organised by Ken. Ken will call Barbie on a telephone to suggest a date to a specific location, such as to play tennis, go for a swim, or attend a picnic. Players have one hour against an in-game timer for Barbie to leave the house in her convertible and return on time. During this time, players visit stores by using the joystick as Barbie drives past them in her car. Each store has clothing, hair and cosmetic options that can be selected to change Barbie's appearance for the date. Players use the joystick using an on-screen hand to select items for Barbie, and can also create variations of the outfits by selecting colors and patterns onscreen to apply to Barbie's outfit. Once players selects their outfit, they can leave the store to return home. If players successfully returns home at the correct time with an appropriate outfit, the doorbell rings, and Ken and Barbie leave to the location of their date. If they are unsuccessful, players receive a note from Ken stating that they missed the date, and Ken will call to schedule another one.

== Development and release ==
Barbie was one of several titles in the Computer Activity Toys series by San Francisco based software company Epyx. As the first software series from licensed toys, its intent was to create games that resembled "toys playable on a home computer", that encouraged "imaginative, creative non-structure[d] play". These titles were targeted at younger players, featuring games using licenses purchased from Mattel, including G.I. Joe and Hot Wheels. The series was conceived by Epyx president Michael Katz, a former marketing director for Mattel, who engaged toy designer Eddy Goldfarb of Eddy Goldfarb & Associates as the development lead for the games. Goldfarb subcontracted programming of the Barbie game to two uncredited women in his company, assisted by programmer Larry Irvin. The game uses samples of speech in phone calls between Barbie and Ken, with Irvin stating implementation was "very difficult" as digitized speech was not a common feature of the Commodore 64 at the time.

The game was announced by Epyx alongside the Computer Activity Toys lineup at the 1984 Summer Consumer Electronics Show, for a planned Christmas release. Barbie was also showcased by Epyx at an annual Barbie Convention in New York City. Versions for the Atari, Apple II, and IBM PCjr were planned.

== Reception ==
Reception

Review score
| Publication | Score |
|---|---|
| Run | C |

According to Katz, Barbie and the Computer Activity Toys series were not a commercial success, attributing the performance to limited funds to advertise and market the games, and a lack of promotional support from Mattel, Hasbro and retail stores. Reviews of the game were also average. Critics generally praised the game's visual presentation and sound. Run stated the game's graphics and sound were "superb" and "admirably rich in colourful, finely detailed graphics". The game's inclusion of speech in its audio was praised as innovative, with several critics impressed by the game's "realistic" speech. Several critics disliked or did not recommend the game overall. Some outlets questioned the use of computer software to imitate the qualities of a physical children's toy, with Home Computer Weekly stating that the "tactile and manipulative enjoyment" of Epyx's Computer Activity Toys concept would leave "too much missing for the games to be considered equivalent to the real things". Reviewers also critiqued the lack of options, with The Guide to Computer Living wondering if the game "would have allowed for more options [and] variance in the gameplay", and Run stating players would quickly tire of the game.

A number of reviewers also critiqued what they saw as consumerist and sexist themes. Some of these reflected broader attitudes to the doll at the time, with Computer Gaming World describing it and the game as "repressibly empty-headed and sexist" over several years. Several reviewers disliked that the game did not allow Barbie to independently call Ken or disagree with his proposed date. Computer Gaming World stated the game promoted a "buy ethic" and "male chauvinism". Run considered the game was sexist, critiquing Barbie's "embarrassingly underdeveloped" characterisation. Computer Entertainer stated the game promoted "conspicuous consumption" and "encourages stereotypical, passive behaviour" in girls.

== See also ==
- List of Barbie video games
