= Desean Terry =

American actor, acting coach and theatre director

- Born: Desean Kevin Terry
- Education: Loyola Marymount University (BA); Juilliard School (GrDip); California State University, Long Beach (MFA)

Desean Kevin Terry is an American actor, acting coach and theatre director. He is best known for his recurring role in the television series The Morning Show (2019–2021).

== Education ==
Terry attended Loyola Marymount University and graduated as part of the class of 2000. After earning his undergraduate degree, he trained at Juilliard. He later received an MFA in acting pedagogy from California State University, Long Beach.

== Filmography ==
=== Film ===
Year	Title	Role	Director	Notes
2000	God's Army	Elder Banks	Richard Dutcher	
2005	States of Grace	Banks	Richard Dutcher	
2007	Suffering Man's Charity	Young Caterer	Alan Cumming	
2007	Poet of the Swingin' Blade	The Runaway	James E. Hurd Jr.	Short
2009	Post Grad	Young Cop	Vicky Jenson	
2009	Evil Angel	Shawn	Richard Dutcher	
2010	Magic	Alice's A.D.	Robert Davi	
2010	On the Doll	Police Officer	Thomas Mignone	
2011	Ghost Phone	Orderly	Jeffrey F. Jackson	
2012	Famous	Cousin Eddie	Evan Lai	Short
2013	Crossed	Harold	Zak Forsman	Short
2013	In the First Degree	Jeremy	Julie Bersani	Short
2015	Identification	Doctor	Stephen Nolly	Short
2015	The Parting Shot	Luther Morris	Anirban Roy	Short
2015	Brentwood Strangler	Officer Canon	John Fitzpatrick	Short
2016	Somebody's Mother	Vincent	Gabriela Tollman	
2017	The Retreat	Dorian	Luis Robledo	Short
2018	The Killers	Al	Gabriel Miller & Alexander Slesers	Short
2019	Thy Father's Spirit	Laertes	Steven Maler	
2019	Outpatient	Mason	Steve Yager	Short
2019	Bury Me Not	John	Charlene Bagcal	Short
2019	Shape Shifter	Kevin	Kelly Thompson	Short
2021	Language Lessons	Will	Natalie Morales	Screenlife film

=== Television ===
Year	Title	Role	Director	Notes
2005-2006	Sleeper Cell	FBI Technician #1	Nick Gomez	TV series (2 episodes)
2007	ER	Rodney	John Wells	TV series (1 episode)
2009	Southland	Eddie	Christopher Chulack	TV series (2 episodes)
2010	House	Charles	Greg Yaitanes	TV series (1 episode)
2011	Torchwood	Male Nurse	Billy Gierhart	TV series (1 episode)
2011	Grey's Anatomy	Colin Cooke	Steve Robin	TV series (1 episode)
2012	Shameless	Ron	Alex Graves	TV series (1 episode)
2012	Harry's Law	Deputy	Bill D'Elia	TV series (1 episode)
2012	NCIS: Los Angeles	Navy Officer Lambert	Jonathan Frakes	TV series (1 episode)
2013	That Guy	Basketball Player	Jeanine Daniels	TV series (1 episode)
2013	The Couple	David Wellington	Dennis Dortch	TV series (1 episode)
2014	Scorpion	Agent Bates	Justin Lin	TV series (1 episode)
2014	The Night Shift	Mikey	Kevin Dowling	TV series (1 episode)
2018	Dumped	Derek	Ciji Michelle Campbell	TV series (2 episodes)
2019–2021	The Morning Show	Daniel Henderson	Mimi Leder, David Frankel, ...	TV series (10 episodes)
2020	Room 104	Durkon	Julian Wass	TV series (1 episode)
2025	The Creep Tapes	Officer Maher	Patrick Brice	TV series (1 episode)

=== Video games ===
Year	Title	Role
2011	L.A. Noire	Nelson Gaines

=== Producer ===
Year	Title	Director	Notes
2012	Touchy	Ryan Richmond	Short
