= Marcus Mumford (lawyer) =

American criminal defence lawyer (died 2020)

Marcus Mumford was an American criminal defense lawyer. He was known for representing the defendants in the 2016 occupation of the Malheur National Wildlife Refuge and Ponzi schemer Rick Koerber.

== Early life and education ==
Mumford was raised on a dairy farm in Idaho. He graduated from Utah State University and went on to receive a Juris Doctor from Brigham Young University.

== Career ==
Early in his career, Mumford clerked for a federal appellate judge before joining the law firm of Skadden, Arps, Slate, Meagher & Flom, where he worked for seven years. He eventually left that firm to open his own practice based in Salt Lake City, Utah.

As a lawyer, Mumford was known for the special attention he paid to proofreading his written filings. Mumford had a pronounced stutter throughout his life and, according to an associate in his law firm – speaking after his death – "his written product was the only chance he had to communicate [his message] correctly the first time".

=== Notable cases ===
==== Rick Koerber trial ====
Mumford was retained to represent Rick Koerber, who was indicted on federal charges in 2009 related to a Ponzi scheme he ran. In 2014, federal judge Clark Waddoups dismissed all charges against Koerber, agreeing with Mumford's claim that federal officials had interfered with Koerber's right to a speedy trial. More than two years later, following a favorable appellate ruling, federal prosecutors refiled the charges against Koerber. Mumford again represented Koerber.

In September 2017, the United States Department of Justice filed a professional conduct complaint against Mumford with the Utah Bar. According to the Salt Lake Tribune, Mumford believed "it was filed to prevent him from effectively defending Koerber".

Koerber's trial resulted in a hung jury. Federal officials refiled charges against him. Mumford did not represent Koerber in his second trial, which ended in a conviction.

==== Malheur Occupation trial ====
In 2016, Mumford represented Cliven Bundy and others charged with the Occupation of the Malheur National Wildlife Refuge, securing not guilty verdicts for all seven defendants. After United States District Court Judge Anna Brown ordered Bundy to remain in custody to answer for separate charges related to the 2014 Bundy standoff, Mumford loudly protested; after he refused to stop speaking, he was arrested by United States Marshals on the misdemeanor charge of Disrupting Official Government Duties. During his subsequent trial, several Oregon attorneys protested Mumford's arrest, including the federal public defender for the District of Oregon Lisa Hay, who observed Mumford's trial while wearing a "Free Marcus Mumford" lapel pin.

At trial, Mumford's attorney, Michael Levine, argued the marshals engaged in "outrageous" misconduct. Federal prosecutors ultimately dropped the charges against Mumford without providing a reason, a move Levine characterized as "surprising".

== Personal life and death ==
Mumford was found dead from a seizure – in his home in April 2020 – by a colleague who had come by to discuss a case. At the time of his death, he was divorced with seven children.
