= Girl Crazy (disambiguation) =

Girl Crazy is a 1930 Broadway musical by the Gershwins.

It is also the title of two film adaptations:

- Girl Crazy (1932 film), starring Bert Wheeler and Robert Woolsey
- Girl Crazy (1943 film), starring Mickey Rooney and Judy Garland

Unrelated films include:

- Girl Crazy (1929 film), a Mack Sennett comedy
- Girl Crazy (1997 film), directed by Richard Dutcher

Other uses:

- A 1982 hit single by Hot Chocolate
