= Candace Kita =

American actress

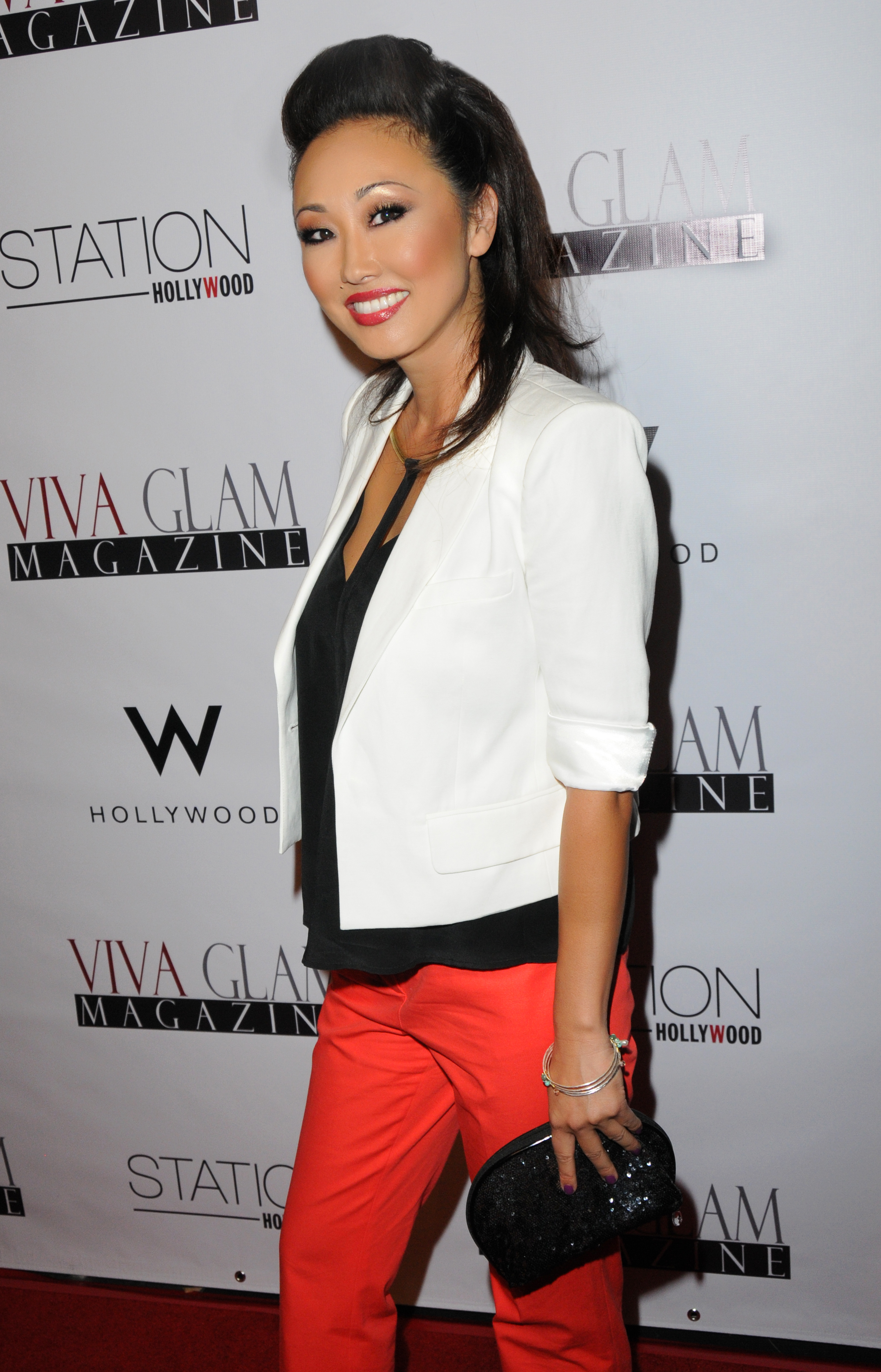
- Kita at Viva Glam Launch at W Hotel in Hollywood, CA
- Born: United States
- Occupation: Actress/Model
- Years active: 1991–present
- Website: http://www.candacekita.com/

Signature
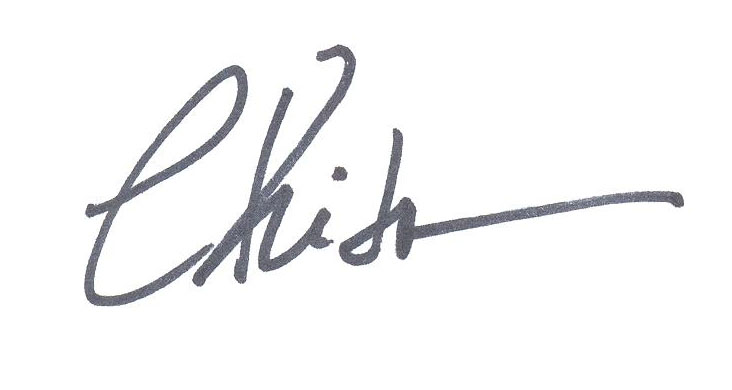

Candace Kita is an American actress and model.

== Early life ==
Kita was born in the United States as a fifth-generation Japanese-American. Her grandparents were interned at the Manzanar concentration camp during World War II. Kita was raised in the United States (including Texas) and throughout Europe, and spent her early childhood in London. While there, she attended the American School in London and the Antwerp International School in Belgium. She played classical flute for 12 years, and as a teenager was invited to play in the Palm Beach Atlantic Symphony Orchestra. She graduated from college with a BA in philosophy and contemporary religion.

== Career ==
=== Acting ===
Kita's first role was as a news anchor in the 1991 movie Stealth Hunters. Kita's first recurring television role was in Fox's Masked Rider, from 1995 to 1996. She appeared as a series regular lead in all 40 episodes. Kita also portrayed a frantic stewardess in a music video directed by Mark Pellington for the British group, Catherine Wheel, titled, "Waydown" in 1995. In 1996, Kita also appeared in the film Barb Wire (1996) and guest starred on The Wayans Bros.. She also guest starred in Miriam Teitelbaum: Homicide with Saturday Night Live alumni Nora Dunn, Wall To Wall Records with Jordan Bridges, Even Stevens, Felicity with Keri Russell, V.I.P. with Pamela Anderson, Girlfriends, The Sweet Spot with Bill Murray, and Movies at Our House. She also had recurring roles on the FX spoof, Son of the Beach from 2001 to 2002, ABC-Family's Dance Fever and Oxygen Network's Running with Scissors. Kita also appeared in the films Little Heroes (2002) and Rennie's Landing (2001).

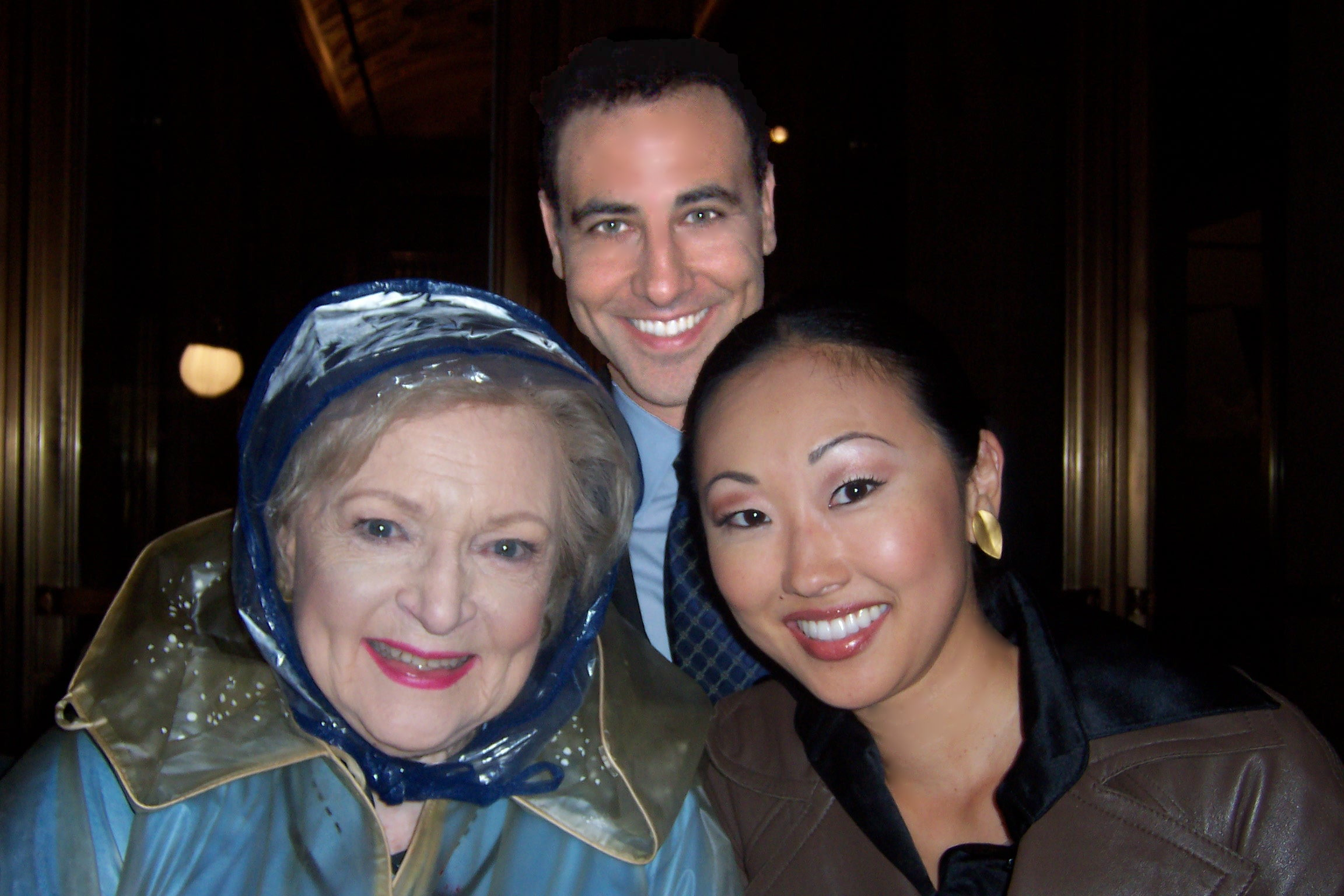
Shooting Ugly Betty with Betty White

Kita guest starred on Method and Red and Quintuplets in 2004 and Two and a Half Men in 2005. She also appeared in Bad News Bears (2005) with Billy Bob Thornton and Greg Kinnear.

In 2005 to 2007, Kita continued work on Complete Savages. She also appeared in the independent films, Faith Happens (2006) and Falling (2008). In 2006, she was in the pilot for the television series Smith, with Ray Liotta and played a prison inmate in Pepper Dennis with Rebecca Romijn. Kita also shot a pilot with Tim Stack called The Probe (2006). In 2007, she appeared in an episode of Ugly Betty with Vanessa Williams, and had a role in the Adam Sandler and Kevin James film I Now Pronounce You Chuck and Larry. In 2008, Kita guest starred opposite James Belushi in According to Jim and played herself on an episode of The Jace Hall Show. She is a guest star in the 100th episode and series finale of Nip/Tuck.

She has also appeared as a guest star in Revenge, Better With You, and Raising Hope among others.

Kita hosted a call-in show on Sway TV on Amazon Live.

== Editor ==
Kita was a managing editor at VIVA GLAM Magazine.

== Causes ==
Kita has been a long-time proponent of women's safety.

== Filmography ==
=== Film ===
Year	Title	Role	Notes
2020	Reality Queen	Kristy Kim	
2019	I'm F**king Fine	Brooke	Short
2018	Paris Song	Tamaki Miyuri	
2017	MMPR the Last Ranger Parody VII	Trini Kwan	
2016	Love Addict	Pamela	
2014	Circus of the Dead	Reporter Linda Ito	
2014	Dead Sea	Eve	
2011	Coffin	Camille	
2009	Natale a Beverly Hills	Gioia	
2009	I Now Pronounce You Chuck and Larry	Hooters Girl	
2009	Faith Happens	Lisa	
2005	Bad News Bears	Coco	
2004	Mickey, Donald, Goofy: The Three Musketeers		Host of behind the scenes footage
2003	Top Dogs: Little Heroes 3	Chlorine	as Candace Bender
2001	Rennie's Landing	Social Services Receptionist	
1996	Barb Wire	Dancer	
1991	Stealth Hunters	News Anchor	

=== Television ===
Year	Title	Role	Notes
2019	Crazy Ex-Girlfriend	Judge	Episode: "I Need Some Balance"
2018	Tag Your Friend	Sakura	
2017	Confessions of a Hollywood Bartender	Star	Episode: "Welcome to Hollywood"; Unaired pilot
2016	It's Always Sunny in Philadelphia	Charnese	Episode: "Frank Falls Out the Window"
2015	8th Annual Babes in Toyland: Live from Avalon Hollywood		TV movie
2013	Raising Hope	Mrs. Hoo	Episode: "The Chance Who Stole Christmas"
2012	48 Hours	Herself	Episode: "The Preacher's Passion"
2012	Naughty or Nice	News Anchor	TV movie
2011	Wonder Woman	Reporter #3	Unaired pilot
2011	Revenge	Rosemary Cabot	Episode: "Duplicity"
2011	Better with You	Dr. Rettig	Episode: "Better with the Baby"
2011	Jailbait	Officer Earnshaw	Episode: "Chain Gang"
2011	House	Sarah	Episode: "Out of the Chute"
2010	Nip/Tuck	Kei	Episode: "Hiro Yoshimura"
2008	According to Jim	Carmen	Episode: "The Six-Week Curse"
2008	Ugly Betty	Reporter #1	Episodes: "Bananas for Betty"
2006	Smith	Stewardess	Episode: "Pilot"
2006	Pepper Dennis	'Squeaky'	Episode: "Pepper Dennis Behind Bars"
2005	Two and a Half Men	Coco	Episode: "Principal Gallagher's Lesbian Lover"
2004-2005	Complete Savages	Misty	Recurring role
2004	Quintuplets	Alison	Episode: "Get a Job"
2004	Method & Red	Sami Kim	Episode: "Dogs"
2004	The Deerings	Yoko	Unaired pilot
2003	Girlfriends	Waitress	Episode: "Inherit the Lynn"
2002	The Sweet Spot	Manicurist	Episode: "Palm Springs, California"
2002	V.I.P.	Holo-reporter	Episode: "Sunshine Girls"
2001-2002	Son of the Beach	Female Asian News Reporter	Recurring role
2001	Felicity	Contestant #1	Episode: "Miss Conception"
2001	Even Stevens	Reporter	Episode: "Wild Child"
2000	Miriam Teitelbaum: Homicide		
2000	Wall to Wall Records	Secretary	TV movie
1995-1996	Masked Rider	Barbara Stewart	Series regular
1995	The Wayans Bros.	April	Episode: "It Takes a Thief"
1995	Murder She Wrote	Kim Huan's Wife	Episode "Murder a la Mode"; uncredited
