= Ignacio Serricchio =

Argentine-American actor (born 1982)

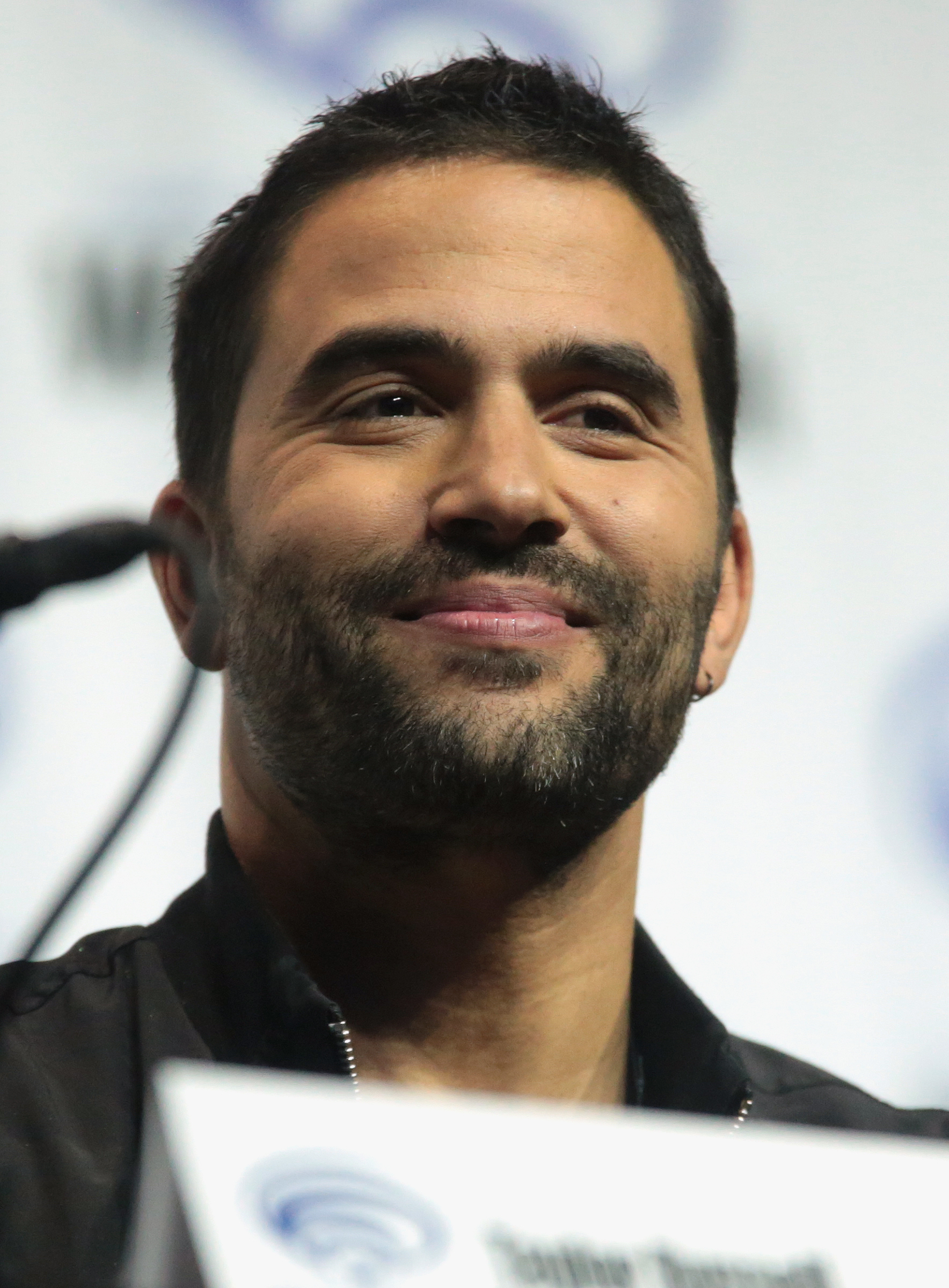
- Serricchio in 2018
- Born: April 19, 1982 (age 44); Lanús, Argentina
- Occupation: Actor
- Years active: 2005–present

Ignacio Ariel Serricchio (born April 19, 1982) is an Argentine actor. He is known for his role as Diego Alcazar on General Hospital and as Alejandro "Alex" Chavez on The Young and the Restless. Other roles include Lifetime's Witches of East End, seasons 9-12 of Bones, and the Netflix reboot of Lost in Space.

== Life and career ==
Serricchio was born in Lanús, Argentina, and is a graduate of Syracuse University's drama department. In October 2004, Serricchio joined the cast of the ABC daytime soap General Hospital as troubled youth Diego Alcazar. He left the soap in November 2006. He returned as Diego on February 22, 2008, until his character was killed off on March 5, 2008. In 2005, Serricchio portrayed a streetwise Mormon missionary in the critically acclaimed film States of Grace. In 2007, he appeared in 6 episodes of Ghost Whisperer, where he played the character Gabriel Lawrence. In 2008, he portrayed Luis in the CW's Privileged. The show stopped filming on February 24, 2009, and was cancelled on May 19, 2009. From December 2012 to January 2014, he played the recurring role of police detective Alex Chavez on the CBS daytime soap The Young and the Restless. In 2014, he played the recurring role of medic Tommy Cole during the second and final season of the Lifetime drama series Witches of East End. In the summer of 2015, Serrichio was cast in the role of Miguel on the BET sitcom, Zoe Ever After starring Brandy Norwood. He played Dr. Rodolfo Fuentes on Bones, seasons 9-12. Starting in 2018, he appeared as Don West in Lost in Space, the Netflix remake of the 1965 TV series.

== Personal life ==
Ignacio has described himself as "Italian" and "Hispanic". He also speaks fluent Italian.

== Selected filmography ==
| Year | Title | Role | Notes |
|---|---|---|---|
| 2004–2006, 2008 | General Hospital | Diego Sanchez Alcazar | |
| 2005 | House | Alfredo | 1 episode |
| 2005 | Rodney | Javier | 1 episode |
| 2005 | States of Grace | Elder Lozano | feature film |
| 2007 | Lincoln Heights | Val Montes | 1 episode |
| 2007 | Wildfire | Jace | 1 episode |
| 2007–2008 | Ghost Whisperer | Gabriel Lawrence | 6 episodes |
| 2008 | Keith | Rafael | feature film |
| 2008 | Privileged | Luis | 6 episodes |
| 2009 | House of Payne | Javier | 1 episode |
| 2010 | The Accidental Death of Joey by Sue | Saul | feature film |
| 2011 | Quarantine 2: Terminal | Ed | feature film |
| 2011 | Covert Affairs | Carlo | 1 episode |
| 2012 | The Finder | Alejandro Lopez-Fernando | 2 episodes |
| 2012–2014 | The Young and the Restless | Alex Chavez | 7 episodes |
| 2014–2017 | Bones | Dr. Rodolfo Fuentes | 9 episodes |
| 2014 | Witches of East End | Medic Tommy Cole | 9 episodes |
| 2014 | Bad Ass 2: Bad Asses | Adolfo | feature film |
| 2015 | The Wedding Ringer | Edmundo/Dirty Eddie Sanchez | feature film |
| 2015 | Scorpion | Alfonso | 1 episode |
| 2016 | Zoe Ever After | Miguel Maldonado | 8 episodes |
| 2017 | Girlfriends' Guide to Divorce | Paul Cordero | 5 episodes |
| 2018–2021 | Lost in Space | Don West | Netflix series – main cast |
| 2018 | The Inmate | Lázaro Mendoza/Dante Pardo | Main role |
| 2018 | The Mule | Julio | feature film |
| 2021 | Good Girls | Nick Martin | Recurring role |
| 2022 | Firefly Lane | Danny Diaz | |
