= States of Grace =

- Directed by: Richard Dutcher
- Written by: Richard Dutcher
- Produced by: Richard Dutcher
- Starring: Lucas Fleischer; Jeffrey Scott Kelly; J. J. Boone
- Music by: Ben Carson
- Distributed by: Zion Films
- Release date: 2005
- Running time: 128 minutes
- Country: United States
- Language: English
- Budget: $800,000
- Box office: $203,144

States of Grace (also known as God's Army 2: States of Grace) is a 2005 drama film directed by Richard Dutcher and starring Lucas Fleischer, Jeffrey Scott Kelly, and J. J. Boone. It tells the story of two Mormon missionaries in Santa Monica, California. While it features none of the original main characters from God's Army, it is set in the same location and has some of the original secondary characters.

== Plot ==
In Santa Monica, California, a pair of Mormon missionaries—by-the-book Elder Farrell (Lucas Fleischer), and his soon-to-leave companion, Elder Lozano (Ignacio Serricchio)—proselytize until they are caught between a gang drive-by shooting targeting nearby thugs. The shootout kills one thug and wounds another, Carl (Lamont Stephens), whom Elder Lozano saves. After being released from the hospital, Carl tracks down the two missionaries, thanking Lozano for saving his life, who gives Carl a Book of Mormon.

Later, the missionaries notice an unconscious street preacher lying behind a Dumpster. Despite Farrell's hesitation, the missionaries bring the man—later identified as Louis (Jo-sei Ikeda)—to rest in their apartment. Meanwhile, Carl, who has been reading the Bible and Book of Mormon, is eager to be baptized and begins taking lessons from the missionaries. While they do so, the missionaries ask their next-door neighbor, Holly (Rachel Emmers), to check on the homeless preacher in their home. Upon their return, they have dinner with Holly and Louis and continue to do so for a few days.

In this time, the missionaries learn that Louis once was a preacher who lost his congregation due to alcoholism and that Holly—a struggling actress—acted in a few adult movies, her parents back home discovering and cutting off contact with her as a result. Elder Farrell promises that God will never stop loving her regardless of her mistakes.

At a local ward luau, another missionary interviews Carl for baptism, teaching him the story of Ammon, a missionary who teaches a group of people to give up their weapons and bury them deep in the ground, vowing never to use them again. The night before his baptism, Carl buries his weapons in the yard and Elder Lozano baptizes him the following day.

As Carl is confirmed a member of the LDS Church on Sunday, his younger brother, Todd, seeks retribution for the death of Carl's friend. The gang responsible for the shootout corners Todd and stabs him to death. The police inform Carl and his grandmother Mae of Todd's death later that day. Carl digs up his weapon and hunts down the man responsible for Todd's death with fellow gang members. Though they find the man, Carl reneges his desire for vengeance and lets him live, leaving another gang member to kill the man to Carl's dismay. Distraught, Carl returns to the ocean in which he was baptized, throwing his gun into the wake.

At night, Elder Lozano awakens to find Elder Farrell's bed empty with evidence indicating he was with Holly. The following morning, Farrell sobs during breakfast, realizing the consequences of his sexual indiscretion with Holly. Farrell confesses his mistake to the mission president, who sends a replacement missionary in a van to take Elder Farrell home. Prior to his leaving, Lozano finds Farrell locked in the bathroom, having slit his wrists in a suicide attempt. Lozano and other missionaries rush Farrell to the hospital.

In the hospital, Holly repeats Elder Farrell's words to him that God will love him regardless of his mistakes. After his release, Elder Farrell prepares to return home dishonored. Drawn to a Lutheran Church “living Nativity” display nearby their apartment, he cries as he holds the Nativity scene's baby Jesus.

In a mid-credits scene, Louis preaches a lively sermon to a packed congregation in a meetinghouse that he acquired from a widow.

== Cast ==
- Lucas Fleischer as Elder Scott Farrell, a by-the-book LDS missionary
- Ignacio Serricchio as Elder Lozano, Farrell's missionary companion and former gang member
- Rachel Emmers as Holly, a struggling actor and the missionaries' neighbor
- Jo-sei Ikeda as Louis, a homeless street preacher the missionaries take into their home
- Lamont Stephens as Carl, a gang member wounded in a drive-by shooting and rescued by the missionaries
- Allen Maldonado as Rob
- J.J. Boone as Mae, Carl's grandmother
- Jeffrey Scott Kelly as Elder Mangum
- Adam Conger as Elder Collens
- Allison Evans as Doctor
- Richard Franklin as Gang Banger
- Jennifer Freeman as Jennifer
- Brett Granstaff as Elder Stearman
- Aaron J. Hartnell as Burn victim
- Samantha Klein as Sister Hershey
- Rege Lewis as Jordan
- Danny Martinez
- Michael May as Elder Myers
- Aiyani Mersai as Sister Savea
- John Pentecost as President Beecroft
- Karyna Shackelford as Mary
- Julia Silverman as Nurse
- Desean Terry as Banks
- Randy Tobin as Beach Guy

== Production ==
=== Music ===
States of Grace: Original Motion Picture Soundtrack

Soundtrack album by Ben Carson
- Released: 2006
- Label: Rub Down The Line Music

Ben Carson composed the film's original score. The CD release of the soundtrack is evenly divided between dialog excerpts and original score (all even-numbered tracks are short dialog excerpts from the film and all odd-numbered tracks are music).

States of Grace: Original Motion Picture Soundtrack
No.	Title	Length
1.	"Soldier" (featuring Josh Aker)	2:42
2.	"It Was An Accident"	0:20
3.	"War Zone"	1:41
4.	"Thou Shalt Not Commit Adultery"	0:24
5.	"Doing Some Good"	1:21
6.	"Waiting My Whole Life For You"	0:40
7.	"Knock Knock"	1:15
8.	"You Were Praying For Me"	0:32
9.	"Prayers Answered"	1:25
10.	"Jesus Would Grab His Feet"	0:33
11.	"What Would Jesus Do?"	1:28
12.	"My Momma Used to Say"	0:29
13.	"Louis Issues"	1:24
14.	"Want to Walk Me Home?"	0:30
15.	"Goodnight Holly"	1:04
16.	"Doesn't Matter What People Think"	0:35
17.	"Confession"	1:34
18.	"What is Wrong With You?"	0:30
19.	"Burial and Birth"	2:27
20.	"Lost Little Brother?"	0:23
21.	"Fire and Blood" (featuring Lauralyn Curtis)	4:26
22.	"At Least You're a Christian"	0:26
23.	"A Gift from Jesus"	0:20
24.	"He's My Grandson"	0:22
25.	"Little Brother"	1:10
26.	"Have Faith in Him"	0:18
27.	"Farrell's Torment"	1:11
28.	"Rather Than Come Home Dishonored"	0:27
29.	"Bloodbath"	1:10
30.	"He Didn't Let Todd Go!"	0:19
31.	"Old Ways"	1:40
32.	"I Think Somebody Already Did That"	0:25
33.	"Second Baptism"	1:32
34.	"I Am Home"	0:27
35.	"In Pieces"	1:54
36.	"It's Going To Be Alright"	0:35
37.	"O Little Town (Burial and Birth Reprise)"	3:36
Total length:		42 min.

== Reception ==
=== Box office ===
States of Grace earned a total of $42,321 in its opening weekend and $203,144 in North America at 35 theaters.

=== Critical response ===
The review aggregator website Rotten Tomatoes reported an 82% approval rating with an average rating of 7.75/10, based on 11 reviews.

Scott Foundas of Variety called the film, "An uncompromising, disconsolate pic about crises of faith." Jeff Shannon of The Seattle Times gave the film 3/4 stars, called it, "upright and thoughtful," and praised the production quality, "noble purpose," and screenwriting. Sean P. Means of The Salt Lake Tribune praised Dutcher himself, the story, cinematography, and cast (Serricchio in particular). Jeff Vice of Deseret News gave the film 3.5/5 stars, and praised the performances of Serrcchio, Emmers, and Stephens, the cinematography, writing, and the soundtrack. But criticized the run-time and the performance of Fleischer. Carol Cling of The Las Vegas Review-Journal gave the film a C+, criticizing the pace and message of Dutcher's writing, had mixed feeling on the character development, and praised Serricchio's performance.

=== Controversy ===
In San Diego, California, a local theater was showing States of Grace. A box office employee told customers that it was "being advertised as a Christian film, but it's really a Mormon film." Some Mormons were outraged and planned a protest, but the film's director, Richard Dutcher called them off, preferring to keep the peace, "turn the other cheek" and let the film speak for itself.
