= Girl Crazy (1997 film) =

- film poster
- Directed by: Richard Dutcher
- Written by: Richard Dutcher
- Produced by: Gwen Dutcher; Richard Dutcher
- Starring: Richard Dutcher; Linda Bon
- Cinematography: Rob Sweeney
- Edited by: Fran Kaplan
- Music by: Miriam Cutler
- Production companies: Main Street Movie Co. Charlie Horse Prods.
- Distributed by: Cinemax
- Release date: July 1, 1997
- Running time: 87 minutes
- Country: United States
- Language: English
- Budget: $55,000 (est.)

Girl Crazy is a 1997 American comedy film written and directed by Richard Dutcher. Dutcher's first feature film, it was initially shown on HBO's Cinemax service, and never received theatrical distribution.

== Plot ==
Tommy McIntosh (Richard Dutcher) was raised by adoring women and he learned to himself adore women. He has a neurotic antipathy toward men. He gets into trouble when Rachel (Linda Bon), the one woman to whom he has professed eternal love finds out he's been sleeping around. To win her back he must learn how to be a man.

== Background ==
Having spent five years in its making, Dutcher admitted that the movie was fluff and "not very good", but said that it gave him the kind of experience in making films that he had not gotten in film school. He also said that his work on this film led him to change course and make God's Army, effectively beginning modern Mormon cinema. Dutcher also stated

My first film, "Girl Crazy", was not very good ... Neither were the early films of Martin Scorcese [sic], Brian DePalma, etc. So much of filmmaking is craft. Craft has to be learned. We're all, hopefully, getting better with each film. That's the goal.

== Cast ==
- Richard Dutcher as Tommy
- Linda Bon as Rachel
- Tim Hansen as Tim
- Lisa Manulkin as Lisa
- Kiki Margiotta as Trish
- Donna Kay Meek (not credited)
