= Miriam Cutler =

American composer

- Born: United States
- Genres: Film score
- Occupation: Composer

Miriam Cutler is an American composer best known for her documentary film work.

== Life and career ==
Cutler is a Los Angeles-based film composer, scoring and performing music for over 20 years. She began her musical career as songwriter and clarinet player with The New Miss Alice Stone Ladies Society Orchestra; she then joined the Mystic Knights of the Oingo Boingo as a clarinetist, and later founded the group Swingstreet. Due to her love of jazz, she has co-produced albums by the likes of Joe Williams, Nina Simone, Marlena Shaw, and Shirley Horn. Cutler has served on a number of film festival juries including the first-ever World Cinema Documentary category at Sundance, The Film Independent Spirit Awards, The International Documentary Association Awards, and the AFI Film Festival Awards. She is a long-term board member of the Society of Composers & Lyricists and has served as an advisor in the Sundance Institute's Composers Lab since 2003. She currently serves on the Executive Committee of the Motion Picture Academy Documentary Branch and the Executive Committee of the TV Academy Music Branch.

Cutler has also been the long-time composer for Circus Flora, based in St. Louis, MO.

On June 26, 2013, Cutler was voted into the Documentary Branch of the Academy of Motion Picture Arts and Sciences.

In 2014, Cutler co-founded the Alliance for Women Film Composers with Lolita Ritmanis and Laura Karpman. The organization provides visibility and advocacy for women composers.

In 2017, Cutler was inducted into the John Muir High School (Pasadena, CA) distinguished alumni Hall of Fame.

== Awards and nominations ==
| Year | Result | Award | Category | Work |
|---|---|---|---|---|
| 2019 | Nominated | Prime Time Emmy Award | Original Score – Documentary | Love, Gilda |
| 2019 | Nominated | Prime Time Emmy Award | Original Score – Documentary | RBG |
| 2018 | Nominated | HMMA | Original Score – Documentary | RBG |
| 2015 | Won | HMMA | Original Score – Documentary | The Hunting Ground |
| 2012 | Nominated | News & Documentary Emmy Award | Outstanding Individual Achievement in a Craft: Music and Sound | The Desert of Forbidden Art |

== Scores ==
- Blue to Trancas (1988)
- Harry and the Lady Next Door (1988)
- Harry and the Dirty Dog (1988)
- Earth and Beyond (1989)
- Hollywood: A Town Remembered (1989)
- Ode to a Bit Player (1989)
- Orangutans: Grasping the Last Branch (1989)
- Prison of the Streets (1989)
- What Your Doctor Won't Tell You About Cancer (1989)
- Getting Lucky (1990)
- Time Barbarians (1990)
- Witchcraft II: The Temptress (1990)
- Under Crystal Lake (1990)
- Cause of Death (1991)
- Witchcraft III: The Kiss of Death (1991)
- Pushed to the Limit (1992)
- Apollo 13: The Untold Story (1992)
- Shattered Lullabies (1992)
- Witchcraft IV: The Virgin Heart (1992)
- Beyond Fear (1993)
- Divorce Law (1993)
- Alien Intruder (1993)
- Witchcraft V: Dance with the Devil (1993)
- Eyes of the Serpent (1994)
- Streets of Rage (1994)
- Hot Line (1994) TV Series
- Body Parts (1994)
- Cause of Death (1994)
- The Dent (1994)
- Love Street (1994) TV Series
- Married People, Single Sex (1994)
- Witchcraft VI (1994)
- Night Fire (1994)
- Revenge of the Calendar Girls (1995)
- Superior People (1995)
- Witchcraft 7: Judgement Hour (1995)
- Close to Home (1996)
- The Death Pages (1996)
- Searching for God in America (1996)
- Bikini House Calls (1996)
- Witchcraft VIII: Salem's Ghost (1996)
- Licensed to Kill (1997)
- Fender Philosophers (1997)
- I Stare at You and Dream (1997)
- Lost Borders (1997)
- Neighborhoods: The Hidden Cities of San Francisco - The Castro (1997)
- Deadlock: A Passion for Murder (1997)
- Girl Crazy (1997)
- Holes in Heaven (1998)
- Death: A Love Story (1999)
- Silent Scream (1999)
- The Double Like of Ernesto Gomez-Gomez (1999)
- God's Army (2000)
- Slender Existence (2000)
- Scout's Honor (2001)
- Amy's Orgasm (2001)
- Lost in La Mancha (2002)
- Downside Up (2002)
- Pandemic: Facing AIDS (2003)
- Peace by Peace: Women on the Frontlines (2004)
- One Wedding and a Revolution (2004)
- Divining the Human: The Cathedral Tapestries of John Nava (2004)
- War of Their Minds: Voices of American Kids (2005)
- Grief Becomes Me (2005)
- Positively Naked (2005)
- Stolen Childhoods (2005)
- China Blue (2005)
- Out of Faith (2006)
- The New Los Angeles (2006)
- California and the American Dream (2006)
- Absolute Wilson (2006)
- Thin (2006)
- Absolutely Safe (2007)
- Ghosts of Abu Ghraib (2007)
- The Longing (2007)
- View from the Bridge: Stories from Kosovo (2007)
- Chris & Don. A Love Story (2007)
- It's Still Elementary (2007)
- One Bad Cat: The Reverend Albert Wagner Story (2008)
- A Powerful Noise (2008)
- Bloodline (2008)
- Thank You, Mr. President: Helen Thomas at the White House (2008)
- Shouting Fire: Stories from the Edge of Free Speech (2009)
- Straight Laced: How Gender's Got Us All Tied Up (2009)
- Poster Girl (2010) Oscar Nominated Short Film
- Flexing with Monty (2010)
- Family Affair (2010)
- The Desert of Forbidden Art (2010)
- The Fence (2010)
- One Lucky Elephant (2010)
- God Willing (2010)
- Awaken the Dragon (2011)
- Independent Lens (2003-2011) TV Series
- Paul Goodman Changed My Life (2011)
- Vito (2011)
- Ethel (2012)
- Band of Sisters (2013)
- Kings Point (2013) Oscar Nominated Short Film
- American Promise (2013) Sundance Winner
- One Last Hug: Three Days at Grief Camp (2014)
- Mind/Game: The Unquiet Journey of Chamique Holdsclaw (2015)
- The Hunting Ground (2015)
- A Plastic Ocean (2016)
- Finding Kukan (2017)
- RBG (2018)
- Dark Money (2018)
- Love, Gilda (2019)
- Flannery (2020)
- Dilemma of Desire (2020)
- Eddy's World (2020)
- 'Til Kingdom Come (2020)
- The Human Trial (2021)
