= Band of Sisters (film) =

- Theatrical release poster
- Directed by: Mary Fishman
- Produced by: Mary Fishman
- Cinematography: Ines Sommer; Bill Glader
- Edited by: Bernadine Colish
- Music by: Miriam Cutler
- Release date: 2012

Band of Sisters is a 2012 documentary by director Mary Fishman that tells the story of U.S. women religious from the Second Vatican Council to 2010. The documentary claims that, more than most other Catholic organizations, U.S. women religious followed the "spirit" and "letter" of the church council, heeding its call to renewal and involving themselves with systemic change inside and outside the convent. Among the activities chronicled are the Santuario Sisterfarm (Boerne, Texas), Genesis Farm (Caldwell, New Jersey), CORE/El Centro in Milwaukee (Wisconsin), Mercy Housing, the Leadership Conference of Women Religious, and the Center for Earth Jurisprudence at Barry University. The film includes a discussion of the conflict between U.S. women religious and the Congregation for the Doctrine of the Faith over questions regarding the sisters' positions on women's ordination, obedience, and religious life in general.

== Reception ==
The documentary has been welcomed by Heidi Schlumpf from the National Catholic Reporter, as "brilliant" and "inspirational." Other voices have lamented the absence of a number of the more controversial topics discussed by U.S. women religious, for example their more accepting views on homosexuality, same sex marriage, abortion, artificial insemination, in vitro fertilization, divorce, and birth control. The documentary was featured at the 2012 Saint Louis International Film Festival.
