= Eddy Goldfarb =

American toy inventor (born 1921)

- Born: Adolph Goldfarb; September 5, 1921 (age 105); Chicago, Illinois, U.S.
- Occupation: Inventor
- Years active: 1940s–present
- Known for: Inventor of Yakity Yak Talking Teeth, Battling Tops, KerPlunk, Stompers, Vac-U-Form, and many more
- Spouse: Anita Goldfarb (m. 1947; died 2013)
- Children: 3

Eddy Goldfarb (born Adolph Goldfarb; September 5, 1921) is an American toy inventor. The creator of over 800 toys, he is best known for inventing Yakity Yak Talking Teeth, Battling Tops, KerPlunk, Stompers, and Vac-U-Form. He is the subject of the award-winning short film Eddy's World.

== Early life ==
Adolph Eddy Goldfarb was born in 1921 in Chicago, the son of Jewish immigrants from Poland and Romania. He was one of three children: Bernard was five years older and Bunny (Bernice) was two years younger. As a young child, he became interested in how things work. When he was around five years old, his father, Louis, brought home a radio. When it didn't play, he gave it to Goldfarb, who took it apart to see how it worked. He remembers that it was one of the best toys he ever had. Louis Goldfarb worked as a tailor in a garment factory and sold goods on a pushcart on Maxwell Street to make extra money. He died in 1933, at the age of 44.

Eddy Goldfarb's life changed dramatically; then 12 years old, he, his brother, and their mother, Rose, worked to support the family. He worked delivering newspapers and groceries. However, one of his favorite jobs was working as a soda jerk for Schuster's Drug Store. It was there that his friends stopped calling him Adolph (in reaction to Adolf Hitler’s rise to power) and started calling him Eddy. He became known as Eddy from that point forward.

=== World War II ===
During World War II, after the 1941 bombing of Pearl Harbor, Eddy enlisted in the Navy. As a radar technician, Goldfarb volunteered for submarine duty and was assigned to the submarine the USS Batfish. It was still under construction, and he was on the first crew to take it out to sea. He was allowed to bring only one sea bag aboard, which he filled with clothing, books, and a spool of magnet wire, which he used to build tiny motors. While at sea, he invented a specialized radar antenna. He also had a sketchbook filled with drawings of his inventions, and he decided that, if he wanted to be an independent inventor, he needed to specialize in one industry, and so he chose toys.

After the war, Goldfarb returned to Chicago, where he met Anita, whom he proposed to the day after he met her at a dance, and they married nine months later. Anita agreed to support him for two years while he pursued his dream to become an independent inventor.

== Career as an inventor ==
The first item Goldfarb sold was the Yakity Yak Talking Teeth, a simple gag item which became a cultural icon. He linked up with promoter Marvin Glass, and they brought the Yakity Yak teeth to novelty aficionado Irving Fishlove.

In 1949, Goldfarb had three toys at the Toy Association's Toy Fair in New York, the toy industry's annual showcase: Yakity Yak Talking Teeth (Fishlove), Busy Biddy Chicken (Topic Toys) and Merry-Go-Sip (Topic Toys). All three toys were hits, and Goldfarb's career was launched.

Goldfarb always wanted to live in California, and, in 1952, Goldfarb, Anita and their two-year-old daughter Lyn moved to Los Angeles. Glass was angry at him for moving and refused to send Goldfarb the royalties owed to him. Thus, the couple struggled financially as they settled into their new life in California. They moved into a modest home in the San Fernando Valley, and Goldfarb set up a model shop in their one car garage. When their second daughter, Fran, was born in 1953, Goldfarb didn't have enough money to pay the hospital bill. That night, he went to the home of Lew Glaser of Revell Toys, and successfully sold him a new toy idea, receiving a check in return.

By the time their son, Martin, was born in 1957, Goldfarb's business had outgrown his shop in the garage. At the height of his success, Goldfarb owned three buildings and employed 39 people, including model makers, industrial designers, engineers, sculptors and support staff.

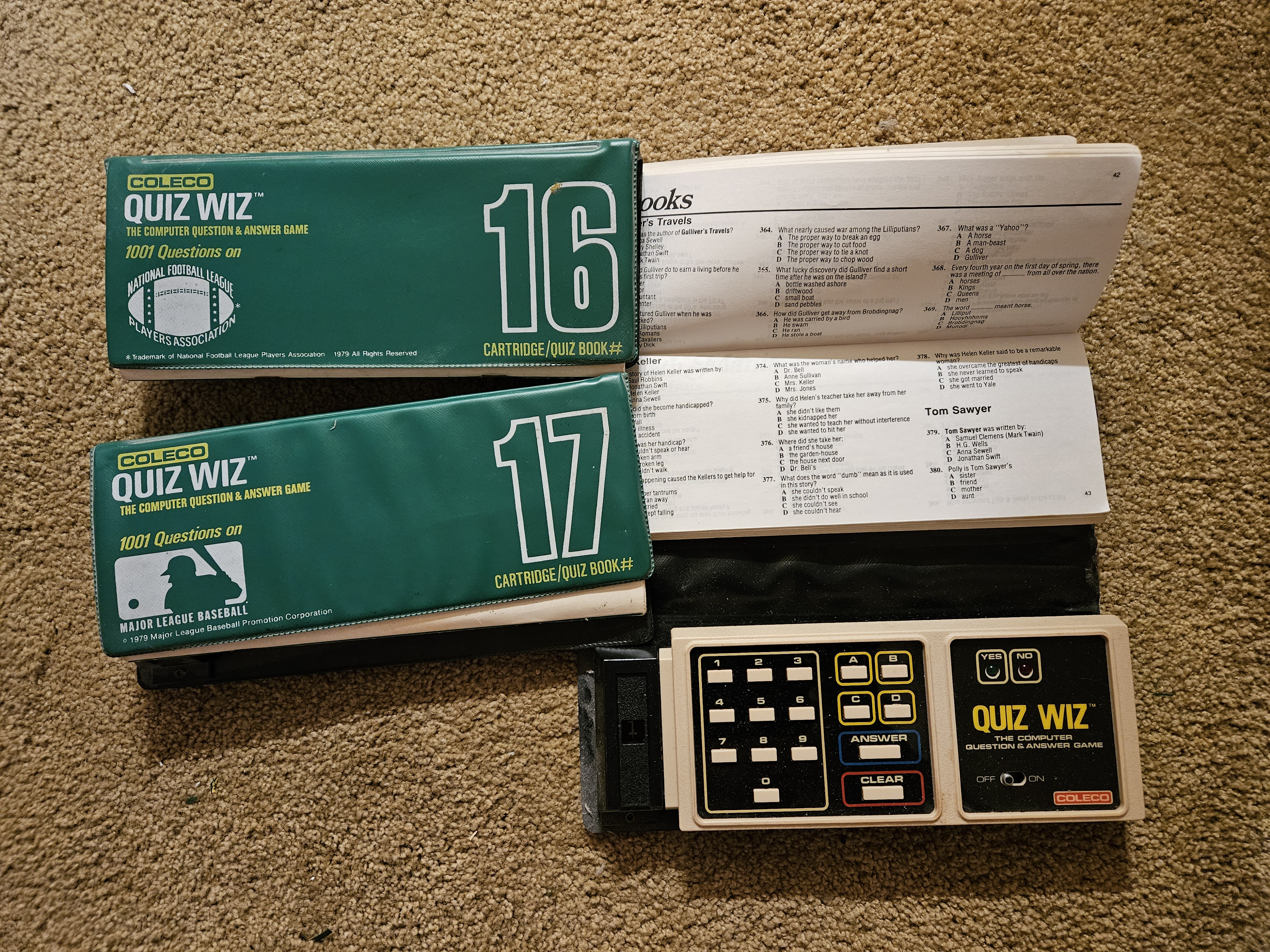
A Coleco Quiz Wiz unit with a trivia book attached, along with two other books for the unit

Goldfarb designed a wide range of toys, games, novelties and hobby kits for children of all ages. He invented more than 800 toys and holds close to 300 patents. Some of his most successful toys are Yakity Yak Talking Teeth, Battling Tops, Vac-U-Form, Arcade Basketball, KerPlunk, Hydro Strike, Giant Bubble gun (which had been prefigured in a 1974 novel, The Boy Who Invented the Bubble Gun by Paul Gallico), Baby Beans, Stompers, Shark Attack, Numbers Up, Quiz Wiz, Poppin Hoppies, Beware the Spider!, Chutes Away, Marblehead, and Snakes Alive!

In 1998, Goldfarb formed a new partnership with his son, Martin, the inventor of Shark Attack. Their partnership continued into the early 2000s.

In 2003, Goldfarb was inducted in the Toy Industry Hall of Fame, and in 2010, he received the TAGIE (Toy and Game Innovation) Lifetime Achievement Award from the Chicago Toy and Game Group. He was the first American to receive the I.D.I.O.T. (International Designer and Inventor of Toys) at the UK Toy Inventors’ Dinner at the London Toy Fair in 1993.

In addition to Goldfarb's career inventing toys, he worked with Hank Saperstein to design and manufacture toy premiums for Kellogg's Cereal. The two worked with Elvis Presley to create an Elvis plastic figurine, which was never released. As part of their collaboration, Anita answered Elvis's fan mail. Goldfarb also designed spy devices and gadgets for the TV show The Girl from U.N.C.L.E.. In 1985, he was one of first toy inventors to venture into video games (EPYX Barbie and Hot Wheels) but chose not to continue, focusing instead on his main passion: designing toys.

As of 2024, Goldfarb, now 103 years old, has become adept at 3D printing to create lithophanes. In 2020, Goldfarb's daughter, Lyn, released a short documentary on her father, titled Eddy's World. In the documentary, Goldfarb describes his love of computers and technology, which he often uses to research patents and help with his designs.

== Personal life ==
Goldfarb married Anita Stern in 1947; the two remained married until her death in 2013. As of 2020, he was in a relationship with Greta Honigsfeld, who also lives in his retirement community. He celebrated his 100th birthday in September 2021.

Goldfarb has 3 children: Lyn (b. 1947), Fran (b. 1951), and Martin (b. 1957). He has two grandchildren. His sister, Bernice Schneider, died on July 7, 2022, at age 98, in Albuquerque, New Mexico.

Goldfarb believes the key to his longevity is "do[ing] creative work of any kind", surrounding himself with his peers, and staying optimistic. He also exercises regularly (especially since his wife's death), writes 100-word diary entries, and keeps working at his craft. As of 2026, aged 105, he is still actively inventing new toys.

== Inventions ==
The following is a list of toys, games, and other inventions created or co-created by Goldfarb:

- The Amazing Spider-Man Web Spinning Action Game (Ideal Toy Company)
- Baby Beans (Mattel)
- Battling Tops (Ideal Toy Company)
- Black Hole in Space (Schaper Toys)
- Bright Starters Schoolhouse (Kenner)
- Brunswick Air Hockey (Aurora)
- Bubble Gun (CAP Toys)
- Busy Biddy Chicken (Topic Toys)
- Dipsy Diver (Schaper Toys)
- Electronic Arcade Basketball (CAP Toys)
- Electronic Learning Machine (Coleco)
- Epyx Barbie (1984 video game) (Mattel)
- Epyx Hot Wheels (video game) (Mattel)
- Farbs (Mattel) – invented with Del Everitt
- Hydro Strike (Pressman)
- KerPlunk (Ideal Toy Company) – invented with Rene Soriano
- Koo Koo Clock (Schaper Toys)
- Lego Creator: The Race to Build It Board Game (Warren Industries)
- Marblehead (Ideal Toy Company)
- Milky the Cow (Kenner) – invented with Elonne Dantzer
- Melody Madness (GAF View-Master)
- Merry Go Sip (Topic Toys)
- My First Builder (Warren Industries)
- Music Box Kit (Craft Master)
- Numbers Up (Milton Bradley)
- Penguin Slide Toy (ABC Toys)
- Phantom 4 Hover Craft (Schaper Toys)
- Poppin Hoppies (Ideal Toy Company)
- Professor Nod (Gabriel Toys)
- Puff 'n Toot (Schaper Toys)
- Quiz Wiz (Coleco)
- Roy Rogers Quick Shooter Hat (Ideal Toy Company)
- Shark Attack (Milton Bradley) – invented by Martin Goldfarb
- Slip Disc (Milton Bradley)
- Snakes Alive (Ideal Toy Company)
- Spiral Designer (Ravensburger)
- Star Trek (Mego Corporation)
- Stompers (Schaper Toys) – invented with Del Everitt
- Vac-U-Form (Mattel)
- Yakity-Yak Talking Teeth (H. Fishlove & Co.)

== Awards and honors ==
- 2003 – Toy Industry Hall of Fame
- 2010 – TAGIE (Toy and Game Innovation) Lifetime Achievement Award
- I.D.I.O.T. (International Designer and Inventor of Toys)

== Sources ==
- Goldfarb, Lyn (March 6, 2020). "Eddy's Biography". Eddy's World.
- Goldfarb, Lyn (March 6, 2020). "Toys Featured in Eddy's World". Eddy's World.
