= Hartman Rector Jr. =

American Mormon leader (1924–2018)

Emeritus General Authority
- October 1, 1994 – November 6, 2018
- Called by: Howard W. Hunter

First Quorum of the Seventy
- October 3, 1975 – October 1, 1994
- Called by: Spencer W. Kimball
- End reason: Granted general authority emeritus status

First Council of the Seventy
- April 6, 1968 – October 1, 1976
- Called by: David O. McKay
- End reason: Position discontinued, transferred to the First Quorum of the Seventy

Personal details
- Born: August 20, 1924; Moberly, Missouri, United States
- Died: November 6, 2018 (aged 94); Orem, Utah, United States

Hartman Rector Jr. (August 20, 1924 – November 6, 2018) was a general authority of the Church of Jesus Christ of Latter-day Saints (LDS Church) from 1968 until his death. He was one of the first adult converts to the LDS Church to become a general authority during the second half of the 20th century. Rector served as a member of the First Council of the Seventy from 1968 to 1976 and as a member of the First Quorum of the Seventy from 1976 to 1994.

Rector was born in Moberly, Missouri. Rector was raised in a somewhat religious family, who attended church only in the summer. Rector studied at Murray State Teachers College and at the University of Southern California.

== Conversion to the LDS Church ==
Rector joined the United States Navy in 1943. He was released from active duty in 1947 and then married Constance Kirk Daniel. In 1950, with the outbreak of the Korean War, Rector returned to being a naval aviator. Rector moved his wife and two young children to San Diego, California, and then went to special training in Hawaii. While he was away, his wife met Mormon missionaries and began taking lessons with them. Rector studied with the missionaries after returning from Hawaii and came to accept the LDS Church. He then was sent on a ship to Japan, on which he was able to study Mormonism with some church members. Upon reaching Japan, Rector met with a counselor in the mission presidency and was able to get permission to be baptized. He was baptized February 24, 1952, in Japan. Rector spent a total of 26 years as a navy pilot.

== LDS Church service ==
In 1968, Rector was called as a member of the LDS Church's seven-man First Council of the Seventy. From February to March 1969, Rector served as the interim president of the church's Italian Mission. Beginning in 1971, Rector was the first president of the church's Alabama–Florida Mission. He became a member of the First Quorum of the Seventy in 1976. In the late 1970s, Rector served as president of the church's San Diego California Mission. In his April 1981 General Conference address, Rector taught "If children have a happy family experience they will not want to be homosexuals, which I am sure is an acquired addiction, just as drugs, alcohol, and pornography are." Though this portion was removed from the transcription of the talk in the Ensign's Conference Report and later on the official Church website, the accompanying video retaining remarks about homosexuality, abortion, and vasectomies remained at least through 2017.

In 1994, Rector was designated as an emeritus general authority and released from full-time ecclesiastical duties. He died in Orem, Utah on November 6, 2018.

== Rick Koerber fraud connection ==
In 2009, Rector was linked to a Ponzi scheme organized by Utah residents Rick Koerber and Brad Kitchen who allegedly touted Rector as an investor, and victims reported Rector's name had been used to attract additional Latter-day Saint investors. Rector was not accused of involvement with or awareness of any fraud; he declined requests from local media for comment while Koerber characterized Rector as a friend but refused to say if he was also an investor. In 2018, Koerber was found guilty and in 2019 was sentenced to 14 years in prison for securities fraud.
