= Falling (2008 film) =

2008 American film

- Theatrical release poster
- Directed by: Richard Dutcher
- Written by: Richard Dutcher
- Produced by: Jeff Chamberlain; Gwen Dutcher; Richard Dutcher; George D. Smith; Dan Urness; Mark Victor
- Starring: Richard Dutcher; Virginia Reece; Cesar Garcia; Frank Uzzolino
- Cinematography: Jim Orr
- Edited by: Doug Boyd; Richard Dutcher
- Production companies: Main Street Movie Co. Destiny Entertainment
- Distributed by: Main Street Movie Company
- Release date: January 18, 2008
- Running time: 82 minutes
- Country: United States
- Language: English
- Budget: US$500,000

Falling is a 2008 independent drama film written, directed and starring Richard Dutcher. The film was released on January 18, 2008.

Dutcher advertised the movie as "The First R-rated Mormon Movie" during its brief theatrical run in 2008.

== Cast ==
- Richard Dutcher as Eric Boyle
- Virginia Reece as Davey Boyle
- Cesar Garcia as Ruiz
- Frank Uzzolino as Hector
- Maria Eberline as Lorena
- Tennison Hightower as Linda
- Hamilton Mitchell as Marc
- Leonard Kelly-Young as Marvin

== Release ==
The film was premiered in The Gateway Theater on January 18, 2008. The film also screened in Beverly Hills Music Hall on August 15, 2008.

Falling was screened in Camelot Theaters (California) in 2009. The film was screened at Sundance Film Festival in 2011.

The film was officially re-released on April 27, 2012 in Broadway Centre Cinemas in Salt Lake City.

== Reception ==
=== Critical response ===
The Los Angeles Times said: "Falling is one of the best small pictures of its kind in recent memory", and Dave Wolverton from The New York Times said: "Falling is one of the 5 most powerful films I have ever seen."

BoxOffice Magazine gave Falling four stars and said: "An important and indelible work, excruciatingly difficult to watch and impossible to forget.", and Wade Major said: "Dutcher has joined the ranks of the very best independent filmmakers in the world."

=== Nightcrawler lawsuit ===
After the theatrical premiere of Nightcrawler, Richard Dutcher sued its director, claiming Nightcrawler was a rip-off of Dutcher's film, since the main character of both films is a journalist who sells records of crimes and murders to various media, and both films take place in Los Angeles.

Dutcher's attorney Stephen Silverman stated that Nightcrawler has enough in common with Falling to justify the lawsuit.

After three years, judge Dee Benson agreed that the two films have some similarities.

On August 19, 2019, Benson closed the case, saying that similar elements are a necessary ingredient for stringer-themed films, and that the two films are too different to have any major copyright infringement.
