= God's Army (film) =

- Directed by: Richard Dutcher
- Written by: Richard Dutcher
- Produced by: Richard Dutcher
- Starring: Matthew A. Brown; Richard Dutcher; Jacque Gray; Desean Terry; Michael Buster; Luis Robledo; Jeff Kelly; John Pentecost; Lynne Carr
- Music by: Miriam Cutler
- Production company: Zion Films
- Distributed by: Excel Entertainment Group
- Release date: August 25, 2000
- Running time: 108 min.
- Language: English
- Budget: $300,000
- Box office: $2,637,726

God's Army is a 2000 American independent film written, directed by and features Richard Dutcher.

== Plot ==
God's Army is about LDS missionaries as they struggle with their work and, almost inevitably, their faith. The movie focuses on a pair of missionaries, Elder Allen (Brown) and Elder Dalton (Dutcher) serving as missionaries in Los Angeles, California ("elder" is an office in the priesthood and a title male LDS missionaries use while serving missions). Dalton is a seasoned missionary and Allen is a new recruit paired with Dalton to be trained.

Allen questions his reason for being on a mission. He is a somewhat faithful member of the church, but his father was excommunicated from the church and his mother doesn't attend anymore.

Dalton proves to be a demanding taskmaster and he demands much of Allen—almost too much in Allen's eyes. Allen teeters on the brink of leaving his two-year mission almost as soon as it begins. Allen witnesses another missionary lose his faith and abandon his own mission. Allen changes his mind as he finds the sacrifices others have made to be on a mission, such as ostracization from family. His own companion, Elder Dalton, dropped out of medical school to serve a mission and is fighting a losing battle with brain cancer. After a trial of his faith and some earnest soul searching, Allen finds untapped courage and embraces his work as a messenger of God.

== Main cast ==
- Matthew A. Brown as Elder Allen
- Richard Dutcher as Elder Dalton
- Jacque Gray as Sister Fronk
- Desean Terry as Elder Banks
- Michael Buster as Elder Kinegar
- Luis Robledo as Elder Sandoval "the Lamanite"
- Jeff Kelly as Elder Mangum
- John Pentecost as President Beecroft
- Lynne Carr as Sister Beecroft

== Production ==
It was financed by private investors.

== Reception ==
This movie was taken on a tour of North America for special engagements. It was primarily intended for members of the Church of Jesus Christ of Latter-day Saints (LDS Church) audiences, but non-LDS viewers were also welcome to showings. The film was well received by its target LDS audience but was met with some confusion by non-LDS viewers.

Many professional critics were pleased at Dutcher's willingness to address some of the more sensitive issues of the LDS Church, such as its past policy that restricted most black members from ordination to priesthood offices. They also enjoyed the look into missionaries' struggles and the work they face. Despite this, some felt the film was too apologetic. It currently has a Metacritic score of 38/100, indicating "generally unfavorable" reviews, and holds a score of 54% on Rotten Tomatoes based on 13 reviews.

As of May 2024 the film's box office sales ranked 67th all-time among Christian films.

== See also ==
- States of Grace
- Cleanflix - excerpts of both God's Army sequels featured on the 2009 documentary
