= Hot Wheels (video game) =

1984 video game

- Developers: A. Eddy Goldfarb & Associates
- Publisher: Epyx
- Platform: Commodore 64
- Release: WW: September/October 1984
- Genre: Racing
- Mode: Single-player

Hot Wheels is a racing video game developed by A. Eddy Goldfarb & Associates, and published by Epyx for the Commodore 64. The game was unveiled in June 1984, at Chicago's Summer Consumer Electronics Show, and was released later that year. Hot Wheels is the first video game to be based on the Hot Wheels toyline, and was marketed by Epyx as part of their Computer Activity Toys series, consisting of video games based on popular toylines.

== Gameplay ==
Hot Wheels begins with the player choosing a vehicle. The player can choose from one of several Hot Wheels vehicles, or can choose to create a custom vehicle instead. Custom vehicles are created by the player in a factory, where the player chooses the design of the vehicle's front, middle, and rear sections, and car paint.

Once a vehicle has been selected, the player can drive around a side-scrolling city filled with various minigames and activities:

- A demolition derby, where the player goes up against three computer-controlled opponents; the derby ends when three of the four cars are totalled.
- Going on an expressway shows the vehicle driving along the expressway non-interactively as the game's theme song plays until the player interrupts.
- A gas station called "Bob's Gas" allows the player to control a mechanic who can refuel the vehicle and check its tires.
- An oil change station where the player can control another mechanic to change oil in the car; first they must collect the spent oil from the car with an oil drain cart, and the refill it with new.
- A car wash, where the vehicle is cleaned.
- A parking lot, where the player can park the vehicle and switch to a different one.
- A tuning shop called "Super Tuner" where the player can have the vehicle's engine checked; the player must tune the engine's four cylinders to the ideal frequencies and amplitudes (represented by a crude sine wave).
- A fire station allows the player to switch control from their car to a firetruck, with the objective being to extinguish a fire; if the water runs out before the fire is extinguished, the house burns down.

The player may also go back the initial showroom at any time to pick (or build) a different car.

== Reception ==
Robert J. Sodaro of The Guide to Computer Living praised the game for its diversity and its "fun" feature of painting vehicles, and wrote: "The detail accomplished in the graphics of this game are some of the best I've ever seen". Roy Wagner of Computer Gaming World wrote that Hot Wheels "isn't so hot", and continued to state that it was "geared for the younger crowd of about seven". AllGame gave Hot Wheels three stars out of five.

Computer Gamer wrote: "On the whole this is a great game for younger kids, anybody over about 11 would find it very tiring and repetitive after only a few plays. And as there is no score as such to compare against every time you play, there is no on-going challenge. The game is obviously designed for younger players and as such is excellent at what it does. [...] Good presentation, good sound and graphics, good for kids but nobody else".

Zzap!64 gave the game a 40 percent overall rating and called it "a game for the very young — or those wishing to reminisce about the 'good old days'". Zzap!64 called the graphics "bright and jovial but not very well drawn", and praised the "Reasonable tunes", but criticized the game for a lack of interesting and long-lasting gameplay: "Quite jolly for an hour or so. But after that there's little to do".

Ken McMahon of Commodore User gave the game a rating of 5 out of 10 and praised the ability to build a custom vehicle, calling it "quite good fun". However, McMahon wrote: "Getting the car on the road was the only part I really enjoyed. After that things got a bit mundane. Basically it's just a case of driving round town playing at being grown-ups". McMahon called the game "a good buy if you're looking for something for children who want to drive around town just like mum and dad".
