= Richard Dutcher =

American filmmaker

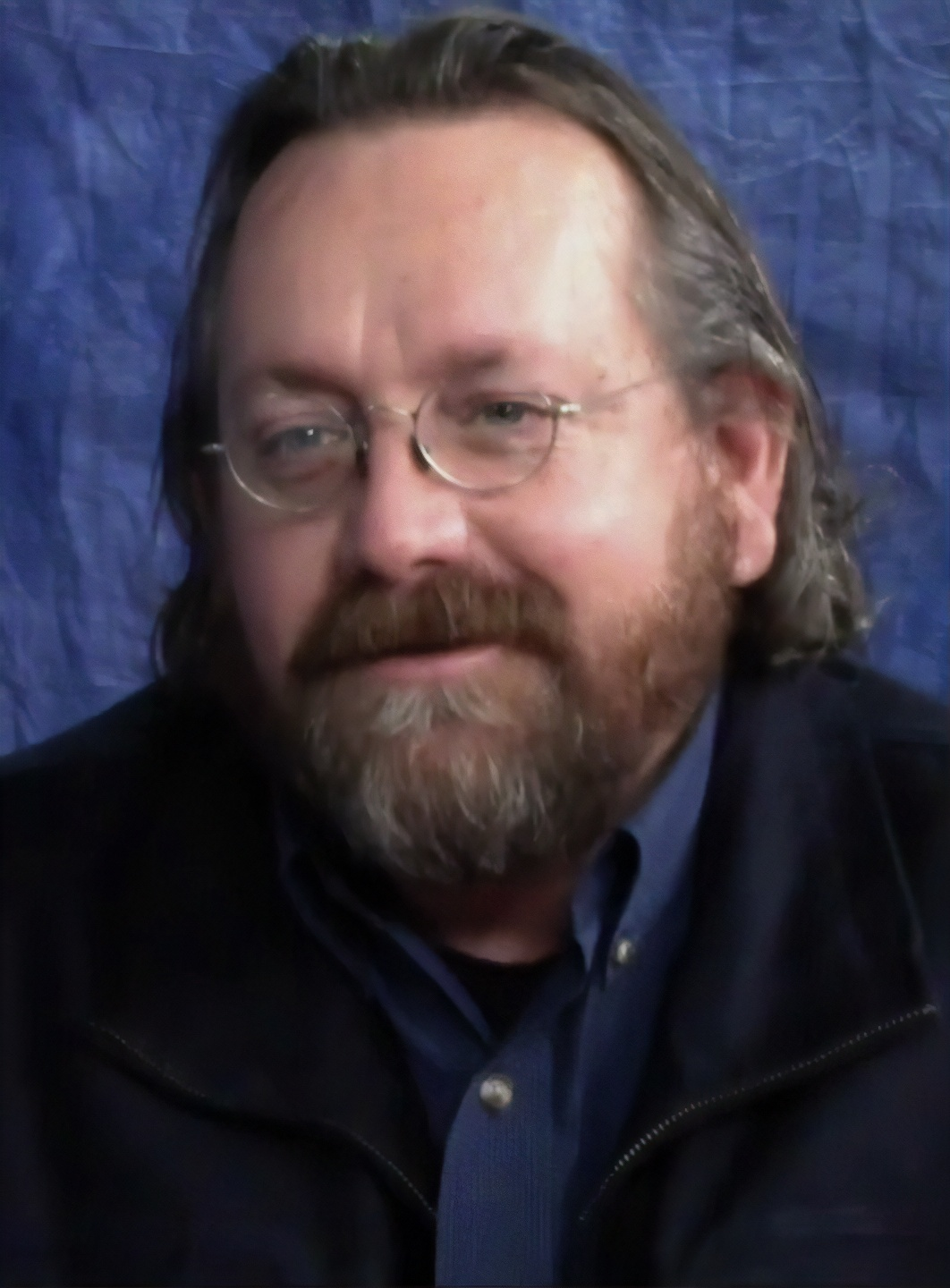
- Dutcher in 2016
- Born: Richard Hill; 1964 (age 61–62); Oak Park, Illinois
- Other names: Richard Alan Dutcher; The Godfather of Mormon Cinema; The Father of Mormon Cinema
- Occupations: Filmmaker; Actor
- Notable work: God's Army; States of Grace; Brigham City

Richard Alan Dutcher (born 1964) is an American independent filmmaker who produces, writes, directs, edits, and frequently stars in his films. After making God's Army, a successful 2000 movie about LDS missionaries, Dutcher became well known among members of the Church of Jesus Christ of Latter-day Saints (LDS Church). Film critic Jeff Vice, of the Deseret News, dubbed Dutcher "The Godfather of Mormon Cinema," a title that is very important personally for Dutcher. In 2007, Dutcher left the LDS Church.

== Biography and personal life ==
Dutcher was born in Oak Park, Illinois as Richard Hill. His family moved frequently, and at age seven his parents divorced. As a member of the LDS Church, Dutcher served a two-year mission in Mexico.

Dutcher lived in his car during high school and was so financially strapped while attending college that he frequently had to choose between eating and going to the movies. Because of his love of film, he normally went to the movies. Dutcher graduated from Brigham Young University in 1988 with a degree in film. Dutcher was married in 1988 to Gwen, moving to Mapleton, Utah in 1999. They have seven children together. After 23 years of marriage, they divorced in 2011.

=== Film projects ===
==== Girl Crazy ====
Dutcher began work on his first feature film, Girl Crazy, in the early 1990s while living in an apartment in Van Nuys, California. Girl Crazy is a romantic comedy written by, directed by, and starring Dutcher. Dutcher raised the budget of the movie (approx US$14,000), then shot it in and near his apartment building. He later raised more money to finish the movie.

It was a sweet story and it was fun, but it was such a long process," said Dutcher. "Probably almost a five-year process before I finally found a distributor.

The movie did not play in theaters but had a brief run in 1997 on HBO and Cinemax. While the movie did not make enough money to pay off investors, it did begin Dutcher's feature filmmaking career. Of the movie, Dutcher said:

I'm never going to spend five years of my life again on something so trivial. But even if you like the movie – and if you do like it a lot, you probably have pretty low expectations – even if you like it, you walk away and say, it was fun, it was 90 minutes of completely disposable fun, and you'd forget about it. Nobody would be thinking about it the next day. And I thought, that's not worth five years of my life. The amount of work and sacrifice and time and risk ... if I'm going to do that again, and I am going to do that again, next time it's going to be for something that means something.

==== God's Army ====
Dutcher's next film was the 2000 indie smash God's Army. Distributed by Excel Entertainment Group, the movie grossed over ten times its $250,000 production budget. Dutcher produced, wrote, directed, and starred in this film about Mormon missionaries, focusing on a Mormon elder determined to finish his two-year mission even though he is dying of brain cancer. The film debuted with a world premiere in Sandy, Utah and was taken on tour around North America for limited engagements, particularly to Mormon audiences, who were eager to see LDS characters portrayed on screen. The movie received mixed reviews from critics. The success of God's Army among Mormon audiences is credited (by Dutcher) for launching the LDS Cinema movement of the early to mid-2000s, a small film niche of LDS movies made primarily by and for Mormon audiences.

==== Brigham City ====
Dutcher followed this film in 2001 with Brigham City, a movie about the search for a serial murderer in a small Utah town which has never had a murder before. As with God's Army, Dutcher wrote, directed, and cast himself as the lead, while Excel Entertainment Group distributed the film. The movie explores how residents of a close-knit religious community, who are mostly LDS, react to and deal with the situation. Overall, Brigham City garnered better reviews with critics than God's Army, but only grossed $852,206 during its theatrical run, far less than God's Army, despite being made with a much higher budget.

==== The Prophet ====
In 2003, Dutcher announced his most ambitious movie project to date: The Prophet, a biopic about the life of LDS Church founder Joseph Smith, based on a screenplay written by Dutcher. In a press conference held in Utah, Dutcher called the movie "the Mount Everest of Mormon filmmaking" and said that he planned to do "the bulk of the filming" in 2004 for a 2005 theatrical release. He also announced that both Val Kilmer and F. Murray Abraham had agreed to portray Joseph Smith and Gov. Thomas Ford of Illinois, respectively (depending on schedules). The budget of the movie was projected at more than $12 million. The movie was never made.

==== States of Grace ====
Dutcher's next film, States of Grace (also titled God's Army 2: States of Grace), was released November 4, 2005. This film follows a set of missionaries in Los Angeles caught in the middle of gang warfare. States of Grace received the highest percentage of positive reviews of any Dutcher movie. Wade Major of Boxofficemagazine wrote of the director, "Dutcher has joined the ranks of the very best independent filmmakers in the world." However, the movie was also Dutcher's lowest-grossing movie up until that time. States of Grace grossed $203,144 during its theatrical run, less than one-tenth the theatrical gross of God's Army.

==== Falling ====
Dutcher's next film, Falling, tells the story of a Hollywood videographer, Eric Boyle (played by Dutcher), who stumbles across a gang murder and sells the footage to a Los Angeles news station for a small fortune. Boyle's life falls apart when the exposed gang members come after anyone with a connection to the incriminating footage. In an interview, Dutcher said that this was the most personal of all his works, and that he would self-distribute the film. The movie was shown on a single screen in Utah for one week in January 2008 and in Los Angeles in August 2008. It was then re-released on April 27, 2012, in Salt Lake City, Utah, on one screen at the Broadway Theater for several weeks. The movie has yet to be released on DVD or through other sources. The Los Angeles Times said that Falling is, "one of the best pictures of its kind in recent memory," and the Los Angeles City Beat called it "a primal scream from an immensely talented artist."

==== Evil Angel ====
In 2009, Dutcher made Evil Angel, an action/horror movie starring Kristopher Shepard with a supporting role by Ving Rhames (Mission: Impossible, Pulp Fiction). As with his other films, Dutcher wrote, directed, and cast himself in a supporting role. The movie was originally announced to be released in October 2012 but has not had a US release. Evil Angel was a modest success in a few foreign markets, but Dutcher later testified in court he had not been paid proper royalties. Dutcher was a witness in the 2017 court case of Utah real estate investor Rick Koerber who funded the film and was later accused and convicted of operating a Ponzi scheme, funding the $5 million film production with money investors believed was used to buy properties.

==== Tryptic ====
In 2010, Dutcher launched a Kickstarter campaign to raise money to complete Tryptic, a feature film he was writing and directing. On the Kickstarter page for the movie, Dutcher explained his need for immediate funding:

My real challenge now, and the reason I'm here, is to film the final segment: "Crucifixion." It's the biggest of the three stories and will be the most expensive, and it's very important that I get this segment shot before the winter snow begins to fall. I'm filming in Utah, and it's October, so ... time is running out.

The Kickstarter campaign for Tryptic set a goal to raise $7,000. On November 1, 2010, the campaign came to a successful conclusion, having raised $10,095—144% of its goal—from 73 backers. As of December 2014, the movie has not been completed.

==== Boys at the Bar ====
In 2012, Dutcher returned to his Girl Crazy roots and made The Boys at the Bar, a low-budget comedy that he wrote, directed, and starred in. The $150,000 budget for the movie was raised by 23 students from Dutcher's self-titled "Richard Dutcher's Movie Producers Master Class." Dutcher, along with his 23 students, formed an organization called "Project 23," in which all 23 students act as the movie's producers and fundraisers. Shot over seven days in Salt Lake City from a heavily improvised script, the movie is "conflict free" and centers around a group of friends celebrating a birthday party and telling jokes. In May 2014, Dutcher stated that news of the film's release would be coming soon.

=== Parting letter ===
In 2007, the Provo Daily Herald published an open letter from Dutcher on its editorial page where he announced, "I am no longer a practicing member of the church." He explained that he had taken a spiritual journey that, "may ultimately prove incompatible with Mormon orthodoxy." He hoped to explore human spirituality in film more broadly, but like early church leader Oliver Cowdery, someday he might return to the faith.

Dutcher lamented that Mormon cinema was dying from too many shallow, poor-quality films trying to "make a few bucks." He urged Mormon cinema to abandon "moronic," unfunny comedies that rely too much on self-mockery, and family films, which often lack any valuable meaning. He felt that church-produced movies fail to "share ... the beauty and power of Mormonism," and are instead "polite, remedial and not-so-factual recitations of Mormon History and scripture." The potential of Mormon cinema was still unappreciated and untapped. Dutcher thought the market could be revived by reintroducing well-crafted films that explore the great depths of Mormon themes and experience. Rather than just making "clean" movies, free from violence and vulgarity, Dutcher said, "It is better to tell an R-rated truth than a G-rated lie."

This letter provoked strong criticism from some LDS Church members, most notably Kieth Merrill, a Mormon filmmaker whose work was included in Dutcher's criticisms. In his fiery reaction, Merrill claimed Dutcher was arrogantly ignoring the importance of social and spiritual values. Merrill saw Dutcher as attacking LDS cinema because of the poor response to his latest films. Two days later, in a letter to the editor, Merrill apologized for his harsh criticisms, regretted the loss of Dutcher, and wished him well in his future.

=== Film plans ===
Dutcher at one point was planning to direct Prophet: The Story of Joseph Smith, a film about the life of the early LDS prophet. While Dutcher did not specifically comment on his plans for his movie on Joseph Smith in his "Parting words" letter, Dutcher did state that he will no longer be making Mormon films.

Dutcher's film Falling, was released January 18, 2008 at a single Salt Lake City theater, and later shopped to art-house theaters, where he did not expect to make back the film's money. Dutcher's 'Parting words' letter suggests that these and future movies may be spiritually based but not Mormon-related.

== Filmography ==
Title	Year	Functioned as			
Title	Year	Director	Producer	Writer	Actor
Together Forever (short film)	1987	No	No	No	Yes
Brother John (short film)	1988	Yes	Yes	Yes	No
Mothers, Daughters and Lovers (made for TV film)	1989	No	No	No	Yes
Tripwire	1989	No	No	No	Yes
A More Perfect Union: America Becomes a Nation	1989	No	No	No	Yes
Girl Crazy	1994	Yes	Yes	Yes	Yes
Eliza and I (made for TV film)	1997	Yes	No	No	Yes
God's Army	2000	Yes	Yes	Yes	Yes
Brigham City	2001	Yes	Yes	Yes	Yes
The Singles Ward	2002	No	No	No	Yes
American Grace	2003	No	No	No	Yes
12	2003	No	No	No	Yes
The Work and the Story	2003	No	No	No	Yes
States of Grace	2005	Yes	Yes	Yes	No
Falling	2008	Yes	Yes	Yes	Yes
The Flyboys	2008	No	No	Yes	No
Nobody Knows: The Untold Story of Black Mormons (Documentary film)	2008	No	Yes	No	No
Evil Angel	2009	Yes	Yes	Yes	Yes
The Maze	2010	No	No	No	Yes
The Threshold (short film)	2011	No	No	No	Yes
Luna Mesa	2011	No	No	No	Yes
Absolution Is Now Public (short film)	2013	No	No	No	Yes
Templar Nation	2013	No	No	No	Yes
Skinwalker Ranch	2013	No	No	No	Yes
The Freemason	2013	No	No	No	Yes
American Nobody	2016	No	No	No	Yes
The Next Door (short film)	2016	No	No	No	Yes
Welcome to the Rubber Room	2017	No	No	No	Yes
13 Bullets (short film)	2018	Yes	No	No	Yes
Tryptic	TBA	Yes	Yes	Yes	No
The Boys at the Bar	TBA	Yes	Yes	Yes	Yes
Chapter X	TBA	No	No	No	Yes
Robber's Roost	TBA	No	No	No	Yes
