= Stompers (toy) =

Brand of battery-powered toy cars

Stompers are battery-powered toy cars and trucks featuring four-wheel drive that are powered by a single AA battery. They were developed in 1980 by Adolph Eddy Goldfarb and sold by Schaper Toys. Later, in the United Kingdom, Corgi Toys produced similar toys called Trekkers. LJN also produced a competing product called Rough Riders.

== History of production ==
=== Generation I (Schaper) ===
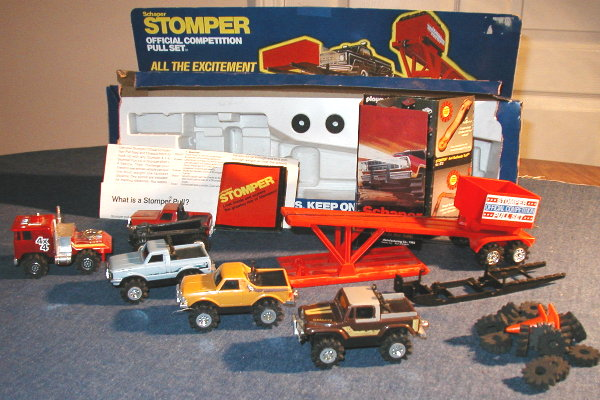
Stompers with competition weight sled

Schaper's 1980 catalog debuted five Stomper trucks: the Chevrolet K-10 Scottsdale, Chevrolet Blazer, Dodge Warlock, Ford Bronco, and Jeep Honcho. Compatible plastic terrains for the trucks to drive through, The Stunt Set and Wild Mountain play set, were the only other Stompers products in that year's catalog. Five new Stomper trucks were produced in 1981: the Chevrolet LUV, Datsun Lil' Hustler, Jeep Renegade, Subaru BRAT, and Toyota SR5. The Stunt Set and Wild Mountain continued slightly modified for 1981. The trucks ordinarily shipped with foam tires but in 1981 an additional set of rubber tires were included so they could be used outdoors. A range called Stomper SSC Super Cycles also debuted in 1981.

The Jeep Cherokee and Jeep Scrambler were introduced in 1982. The Fun x4s line, based on street hot rods, debuted in 1982, consisting of the AMC Eagle SX/4, two Chevrolets (van and 1956 Nomad), Jeep CJ, Subaru hatchback, and Volkswagen Baja Bug. The Work x4s also debuted in 1982; these were Ford C-Series trucks with bucket-lift, cement-mixer, dumper, and wrecker bodies. Four semi-tractors—Freightliner and Kenworth Aerodyne COEs and Mack and Peterbilt were produced. The Official Competition Pull Set was also new in 1982. Badlands, Devil Mountain, and Wild Country sets replaced the earlier play sets; the SSC line continued largely unchanged.

=== Generation II (Schaper) ===
In 1983 the core line of 4x4 vehicles was given a second speed, free-wheeling ability when the vehicle was shut off, and wider tires. The Stomper II Authentic featured new graphics and fender flares. The older single-speed Stompers remained, positioned as an economical alternative to the new multi-speed Stomper, which omitted chrome and decal graphics. New Road Rods were "inspired by souped-up versions of today's most popular customized vehicles." The semi-truck line was renamed Road Kings and joined by Heavy Haulers which featured wrecker or dump bodies. Wilderness Campers featured interchangeable tonneau covers and camper shells and optionally a trailer carrying a boat or motorcycle. A bulldozer and front-end loader joined the Work x4s line, and the amphibious Water Demons and military-themed Mobile Force lines were introduced. Most vehicles also included a Stunt Wheel, a fifth wheel that attached to the vehicle's underside and allowed it to be driven on only two of its main wheels. The Wild Country play set was replaced by the Wild Canyon set, while the Badlands Trail and Devil Mountain set continued. The Stomper Super Cycles continued largely unchanged.

1984 introduced Stomper Super Dragsters and Three-wheeled All-Terrain Cycles. The Wilderness Campers now came with a trailer as standard and added a power take-off winch, and were renamed Workhorses. The Water Demons line expanded to six vehicles, and the semi-truck line also expanded. Several new play sets were added, for both the Stomper II and Mobile Force lines, and two vehicles were dropped from the Road Rods line; these were repackaged into the Custom Kit and Deluxe Custom kit, allowing children to build a custom Stomper.

Monster 4x4, much larger vehicles powered by C-cell batteries, Speedsters, sports cars with steerable wheels and their own special track, and Zanees, which featured outsized engines that shook and made noise, were introduced in 1985. Stomper Overdrives featured an over-running clutch mechanism. Futuristic vehicles made up the new Future Force line. A four-wheeled ATV joined the All-Terrain Cycles line, and two new Super Dragsters were added. The rest of the line continued largely unchanged, though the Competition Pull Set was discontinued.

The Trendsetters line was new for 1986. Mini 4x4s, which were powered by a single AAA cell, was also new. The Future Force line was replaced by the Mega Star line. A Gator Rally set was new for the Speedsters line, and the All-Terrain Trail breaker joined the ATVs in the new All-Terrain Vehicles line. The Zanees, Super Dragsters, and Stomper Super Cycles were discontinued, and other lines continued largely unchanged in what would be Schaper's final year in business.

=== Generation (Tyco) ===
Tyco acquired Schaper in late 1986 and continued Stomper production for 1987. The only new line was Diving Devils, which worked on land, on water, and under water. Water Demons, Speedsters, 4x4s, Mini 4x4s, and All-Terrain Vehicles continued, as did the larger Stomper Bully monster truck. The 4x4s now included "road blocks", small pieces that allowed the creation of an obstacle course. Stomper Overdrives were modified to become Stomper R/C. Tyco continued this line-up almost completely unchanged for 1988. After 1988, Stompers were removed from production until 1992.

=== Generation (DreamWorks) ===
Produced in 1992. New models included a military line called Stormers, Earthquake Alley and Authentic.

=== Generation (Peachtree Playthings) ===
Produced from 1997 to 1999. New models included Road Kill, Work Force, Battle Ready, X-Treme Street. The company moved onto a new product "Shifters" a copycat Stomper that was 1/4" wider.

=== Generation (Tinco Toys) ===
Produced in 2001 and 2002. (Tinco was actually the production company for all of the licensed manufacturers.)

== Gallery ==
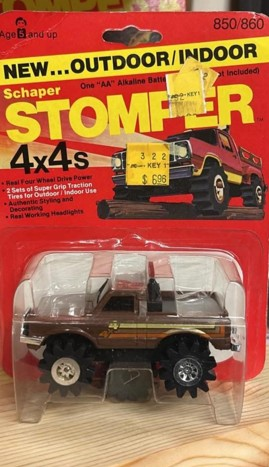
Stomper Generation 1
