= Chattering teeth (toy) =

Wind-up novelty toy released in 1949

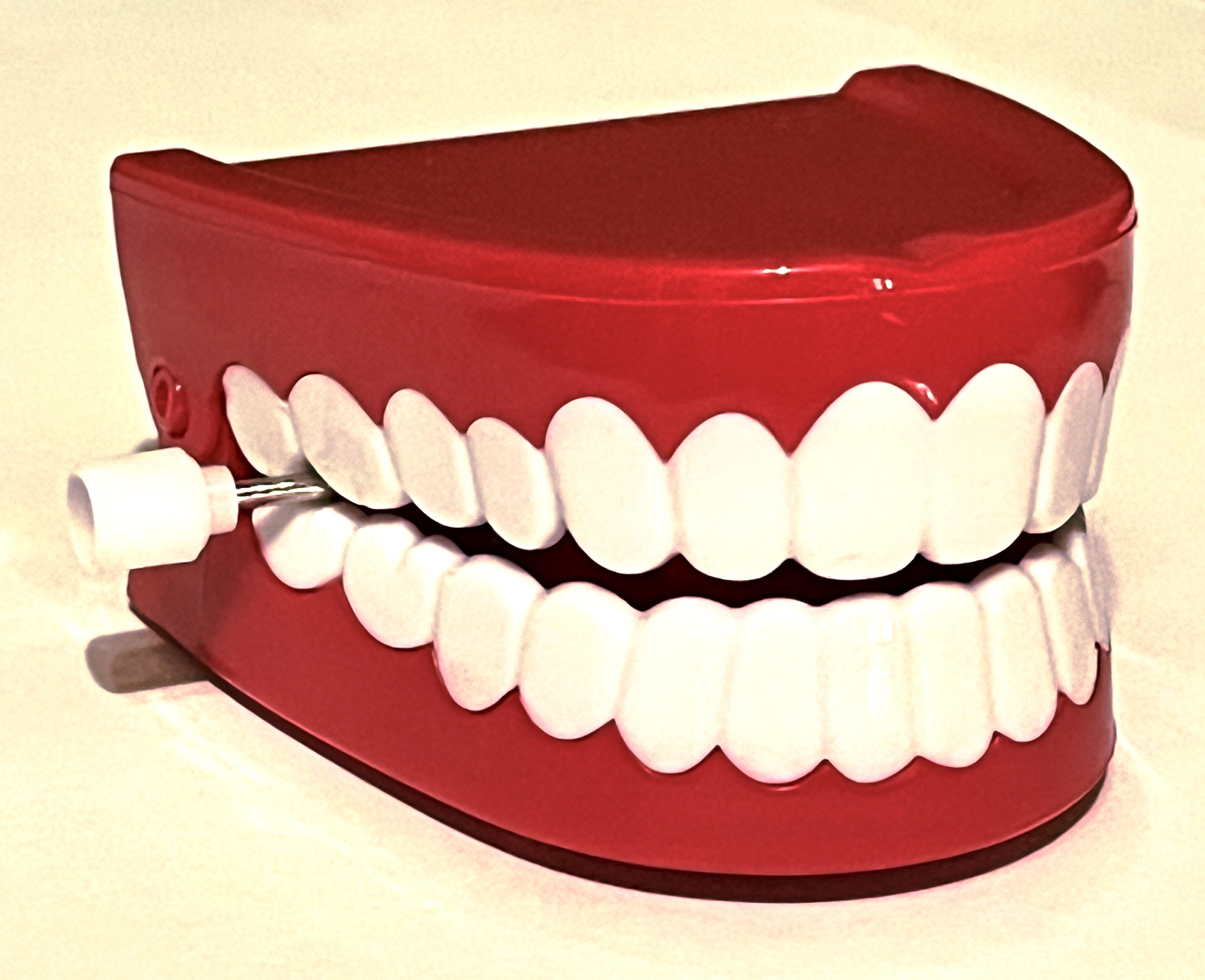
A modern off-brand example differs from the original in its plastic wind.

Chattering teeth (sometimes called chattery teeth) are a wind-up toy invented by Eddy Goldfarb mimicking the bodily function of the same name. Goldfarb and Marvin Glass sold their design to novelty company H. Fishlove & Co., which released the toy as "Yakity Yak Talking Teeth" in 1949. Goldfarb's original design was awarded U.S. patent 2,504,679 from the U.S. Patent Office. As of 2004, a toy based on Goldfarb's specifications was still being produced by H. Fishlove & Co., now a division of Fun, Inc. (a manufacturer of magic trick and novelty items).

Some off-brand variants of the toy add anthropomorphic features such as eyes and feet. The light feet allow the toy to travel somewhat. A directed modification of this mechanism is employed in walking wind-up toys like the bowling ball in Tomy's Strolling Bowling (1987).
