= Vac-U-Form =

Craft toy

The Vac-u-form, was a toy invented by Eddy Goldfarb and released by Mattel in the 1960s around 1961 with the trademark filed on October 8, 1962.

Based on the industrial process of vacuum forming, a rectangular piece of plastic was clamped in a holder and heated over a metal plate. When the plastic was soft, the holder was swung to the other side, over a mold of the object to be formed. Then quickly and repeatedly pressing down on a spring-loaded handle on the side of the unit created a vacuum, sucking the plastic down over the mold and shaping it to fit. When the plastic cooled it solidified, creating an impression of the item.

Various molds came with the kit. Several expansion kits were also available for molding various other shapes. In actual use almost any small object that could withstand the temperature of the heated plastic sheet for a few seconds could be used as a mold. Plastic refill sheets came in a variety of colors.

Mattel's Vac-U-Form is well made and many are still in use today both as a toy and for small size part production in conjunction with other hobbies such as making R/C aircraft cowlings and other parts.

Because very hot surfaces were easily accessible to a child (or adult) playing with the toy, it probably could not be sold today due to safety restrictions.

ToyMax (Cedarhurst, New York) produced a similar product called the "VAC-U-FORMER" in the early 1990s with the trademark filed on April 24, 1992. The ToyMax product is similar in concept to the Mattel product. In an attempt to conform to more modern safety concerns of the period several product changes were incorporated to improve safety over the Mattel product. The hot plate was replaced with a light bulb in style similar to an Easy-Bake Oven. The mold and forming area were covered so the hot plastic was protected from direct contact during the molding and cooling stages.

Both the Mattel and ToyMax products, as well as refill plastic sheets, can easily be found on eBay and Amazon, as well as other vintage toy web sites.
