= KerPlunk =

Game of physical skill involving marbles and rods in a cylinder

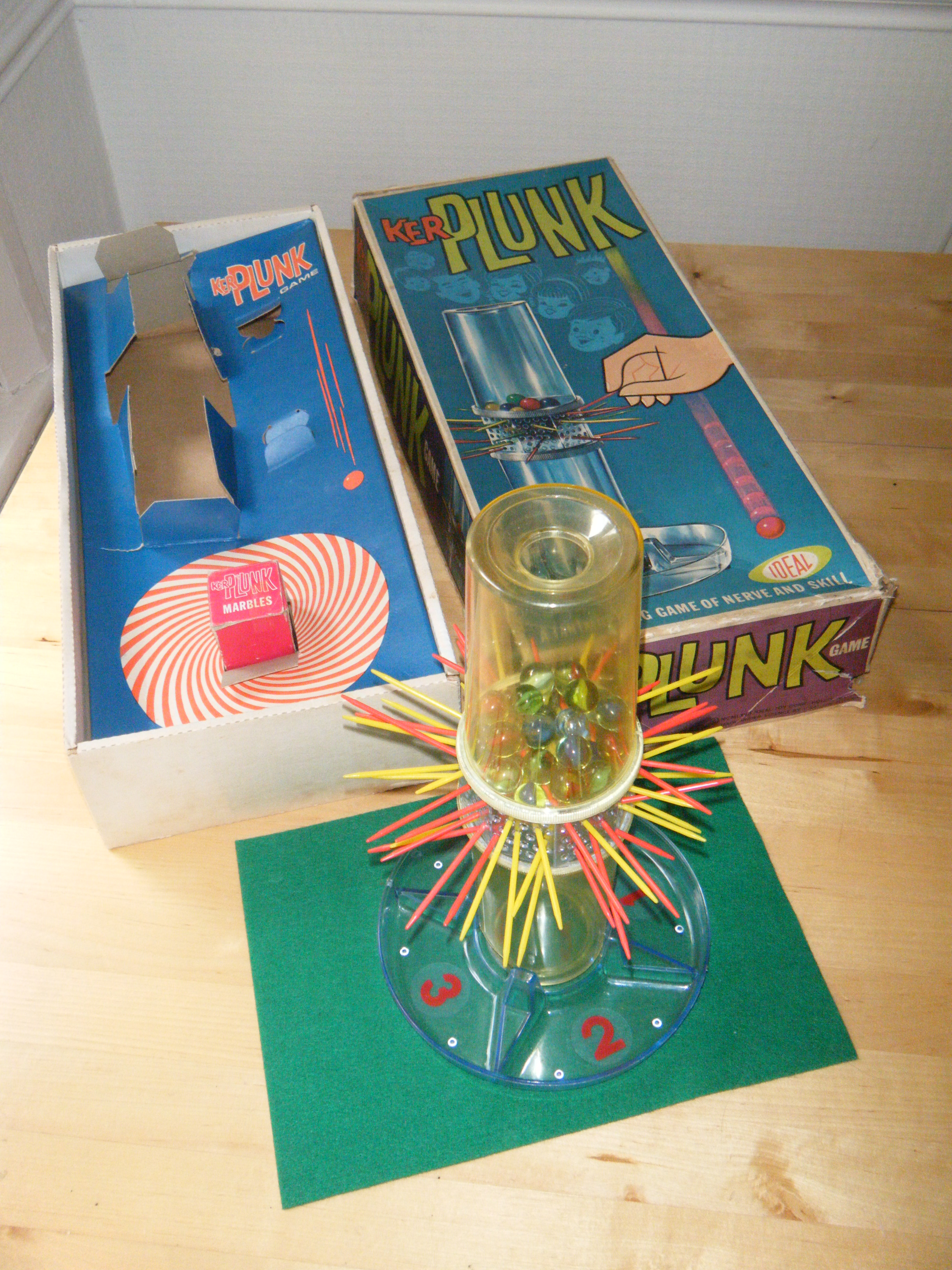
The original 1967 British edition of KerPlunk

KerPlunk is a children's game invented by Eddy Goldfarb with Rene Soriano and first marketed by the Ideal Toy Company in 1967. The game equipment consists of a transparent plastic tube, plastic rods called straws (normally 26 to 30 in total and of various colours — yellow and red predominantly) and several dozen marbles. The base contains four separate numbered trays; the straws are passed through holes in the middle of the tube to form a lattice. The marbles are then placed in the top of the tube and held in place by the lattice. The onomatopoeic name of the game derives from the sound of the marbles tumbling to the base of the tube during play.

At the start of play, the entire tube is rotated so that a hole in the base of the tube is aligned with the active player's tray. Players take turns removing a single straw from the tube while trying to minimize the number of marbles that fall through the web and into their trays. Once a player has committed themselves to a particular straw by touching it, they must remove it. The player who accumulates the fewest dropped marbles wins.

The game is manufactured and marketed by Hasbro in the UK, and formerly by the Milton Bradley Company, and by Mattel in the USA.

A drop tower amusement park ride themed after KerPlunk is planned as one of the attractions in the in-development Mattel Adventure Park in Glendale, Arizona.

== Versions ==
The modern US version of the game uses a pink or blue tube rather than the original yellow tube. The current UK version – formerly New KerPlunk, although this was changed upon rebranding from Milton Bradley to Hasbro Gaming — uses a red and green colour scheme, with an additional yellow marble dubbed "the golden ball", which can be used for either adding or subtracting five balls from a player's total, or ignored.

There are also other versions of it, such as a Toy Story–inspired version that uses a tube shaped like a rocket ship and Little Green Men figures instead of marbles. In addition, the KerPlunk Game to Go features a collapsible tube, making it more portable than the standard version. Another game has also been released known as KerPlunk 2. The rules are the same, except the marbles that come with the game are colored and, after falling, move around a spiral pathway similar to that of a gumball machine. It also has flashing lights and an assortment of sounds.
