= Rick Koerber =

American convicted felon (born 1973)

Claud Roderick "Rick" Koerber (born Claud Roderick Franklin 1973, Casper, WY) is an American who was found guilty in federal court of orchestrating and running a $100 million Ponzi scheme, one of the largest in Utah's history. Koerber took in $100 million from 2004 to 2008 by promising his victims returns of 24% to 60% annually, but spent $50 million on Ponzi payments to prior investors, and also bought luxury items to give his scheme an appearance of profitability.

In 2019, Koerber was sentenced to 170 months (14 years, 2 months) in federal prison and restitution of $45 million.

== Biography ==
In the 1990s, Koerber operated a company called National Business Solutions in his hometown of Casper, Wyoming. He "admitted to violating Wyoming securities laws in 2000", and declared bankruptcy in 2001 then relocated to Utah. His base of operations was Alpine, Utah.

Koerber attracted investors with long seminars that combined his views on capitalism with his religious philosophies. Starting in 2005 Koerber expounded his views on the "Free Capitalist" radio show, from a Salt Lake City AM talk radio station. Koerber's scheme was built around his concept of "equity mill": he used a series of shell companies to buy and sell residential properties to and from would-be investors. He was reported to cite his relationship with Hartman Rector Jr. (an emeritus general authority of the Church of Jesus Christ of Latter-day Saints), who was reportedly in attendance for at least one of Koerber's presentations to would-be investors. By connecting his promises of unrealistic investment returns with the commonly shared religious and political views of his local victims, Koerber was using a tactic for building trust with potential victims known as "affinity fraud". Koerber's scheme was exposed during the 2007–2008 collapse of the United States housing bubble when residential property values dropped sharply, in conjunction with a broader economic crisis, and he was unable to make promised payments to investors.

At arraignment in June 2009, Koerber pleaded not guilty to all charges, and a trial was set for September 11, 2012. In November 2009, U.S. Federal prosecutors filed 19 additional charges of fraud against Koerber, including one count of mail fraud, six counts of fraud in the offer and sale of securities, one count of sale of unregistered securities, 10 counts of wire fraud, two counts of money laundering and two counts of tax evasion, bringing the total of charges filed to 22.

During evidentiary hearings a key piece of evidence was thrown out resulting in one charge being dropped because it was based on a draft of a letter to key investors and there was no evidence it was sent.

On March 28, 2014, a federal judge set a new trial date to try the remaining 18 charges, however Judge Clark Waddoups dismissed the case on June 19, 2014 due to the government violating Koerber's right to a speedy trial. The case was dismissed 5 years to the day after Koerber's arraignment. The case was dismissed with prejudice. In December 2014 prosecutors said they were willing to appeal the verdict. Prosecutors appealed to the 10th Circuit Court of Appeal in Denver, Colorado. On January 21, 2016, the court found that Waddoups failed to consider the seriousness of the charges and Koerber's contributions in delaying the trial. The case was sent back to the lower court and Waddoups recused himself from reviewing it. On August 25, 2016, federal judge Jill Parrish ruled that the charges could be reinstated. Koerber was again indicted by a grand jury on January 18, 2017, on 18 charges, however, the jury deadlocked and a mistrial was declared on October 16, 2017.

On November 1, 2017, the United States Attorney's Office (District of Utah) announced plans to retry the case. Filmmaker Richard Dutcher testified about Koerber's $5 million funding of the 2009 erotic horror film Evil Angel while several of Koeber's investors testified they did not know or approve of their money to bankroll a film, which prosecutors characterized as typical of Koerber's dishonest practices. On September 20, 2018, a federal jury in the District of Utah convicted Koerber on charges of Fraud in the Offer or Sale of Securities, Wire Fraud, and Money Laundering. On October 15, 2019, Judge Frederic Block sentenced Koerber to 170 months (14 years, 2 months) in federal prison and restitution of $45 million.

== Criminal conviction ==
A jury of eight men and four women found Koerber guilty of 15 counts of securities fraud, wire fraud and money laundering. They found him not guilty on two counts of tax evasion.
