= List of deans of the Marriott School of Business =

The J. Willard and Alice S. Marriott School of Business (MSB) is a business school at Brigham Young University (BYU), a private university owned by the Church of Jesus Christ of Latter-day Saints (LDS Church), and located in Provo, Utah, United States. The following people have served as deans of the MSB:

- Weldon J. Taylor (1957-1974): first dean
- Bryce B. Orton, Acting Dean (1974-1975)
- Merrill J. Bateman (1975-1979): Economist, future LDS Church general authority and president of BYU
- William G. Dyer (1979-1984)
- Paul H. Thompson (1984-1989)
- K. Fred Skousen (1989-1998)
- Ned C. Hill (1998-2008): Finance professor
- Gary C. Cornia (2008-2013): Past president of the National Tax Association
- Lee Tom Perry (2013–2018): Professor of Organizational Leadership
- Brigitte C. Madrian (2018-present): Behavioral economist, first female dean

== Sources ==
- Taylor, Weldon J. (1991). Pragmatics of values: History of the first twenty years of the National Advisory Council in partnership with the J. Willard and Alice S. Marriott School of Management : 1966-1985. Brigham Young University. ISBN 0-8425-2302-2.
