= BYU School of Accountancy =

- Established: 1976
- Parent institution: Marriott School of Business
- Affiliations: The Church of Jesus Christ of Latter-day Saints; Brigham Young University
- Undergraduates: 390 per year
- Postgraduates: 210 per year
- Location: Provo, Utah, USA; 40°15′2″N 111°39′8″W
- Campus: Brigham Young University
- Director: Melissa Larson
- Website: marriottschool.byu.edu/soa

The School of Accountancy (SOA) at Brigham Young University is a department within the Marriott School of Business. The school offers one bachelor's degree and one master's degree.

== History ==
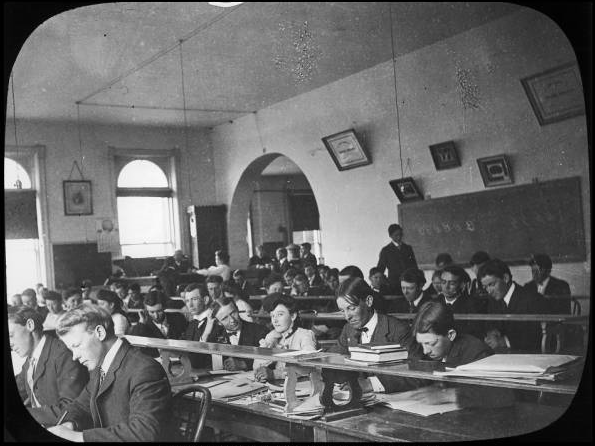
A bookkeeping class in 1895 at what later became Brigham Young University

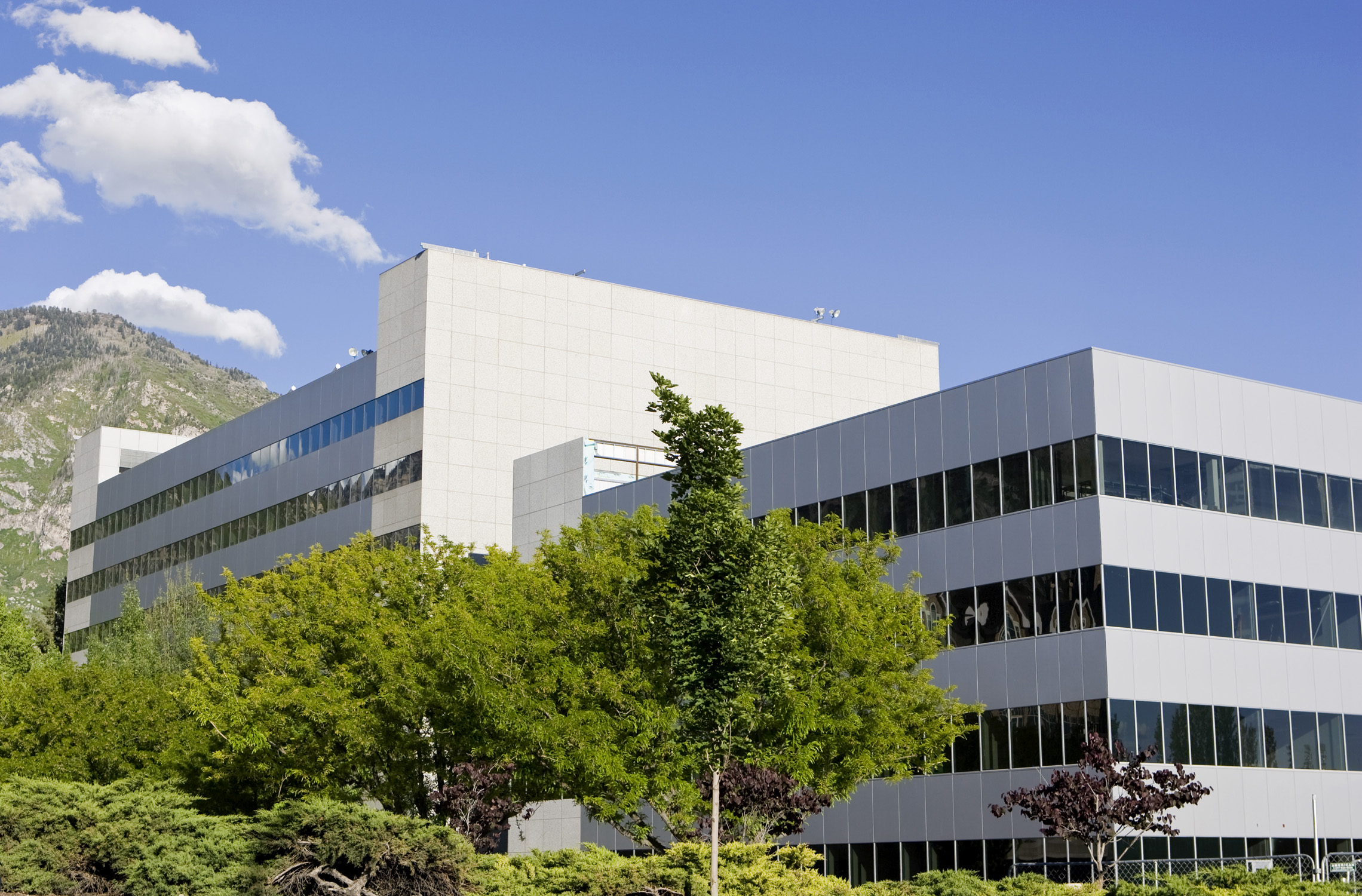
The School of Accountancy was created in 1976 within the Marriott School of Management.

The SOA's roots date back to the beginnings of Brigham Young University. Bookkeeping classes were taught at Brigham Young Academy (which later became BYU) in its Commercial College (the Marriott School of Management's predecessor).

In 1976, under the direction of dean Merrill J. Bateman, the Marriott School of Management created the Institute of Professional Accountancy within its jurisdiction. Then in 1990 faculty from the Information Management Department joined the school to consolidate the faculty and form a nucleus for program development. However, on August 12, 2005 the Marriott School announced the division of the School of Accountancy and Information Systems into two parts: the School of Accountancy and the Information Systems Department.

The SOA started a Ph.D. prep track informally in 1994. The professors noticed several students who had a desire to enter a Ph.D. program but realized that they understood very little about what earning a Ph.D. entailed; moreover, since academia is suffering from a significant shortage of accounting professors and is projected to face even more significant shortages in the future, the program seemed ideally suited for the situation., The program was formalized in 2000, as applicants were required to apply and efforts were made to more formally recruit students. In 2002, seven students finished the program and entered Ph.D. programs. Thereafter, the program has placed between four and nine students each year into Ph.D. programs across the country. The Ph.D. Prep Track has been successful in placing into doctoral programs 100 percent of its graduates who have submitted applications. The school has become the largest single provider of students into Ph.D. programs in the United States.

== Degrees and programs ==
The School of Accountancy offers two degrees. The Bachelor of Science in Accountancy requires that students complete a core curriculum during their junior year that comprises 24 credit hours of accounting classes over the course of the fall and winter semesters. Students work in a team of five or six for the entire year and stay in the classroom for a three-hour block while professors rotate in and out.

The Master of Accountancy (MAcc) graduate degree has two emphases, a tax emphasis or a professional audit emphasis. Within either emphasis, students can apply to enter the Ph.D. Prep Track, which focuses on preparing students to apply for and enter a Ph.D. program upon graduating from BYU.

Many undergraduate students at the SOA opt into a dual-degree BSAcc/MAcc, which takes five years to complete.

== Conferences and endeavors ==
Since 2004, the SOA has hosted an annual Accounting Research Symposium. The purpose of the symposium is “to unite BYU alumni and friends in our efforts to foster relevant and consequential accounting research.” One of the explicit purposes of the symposium is to bring back students who have graduated from the Ph.D. Prep Track to network and receive feedback on research ideas.

Under the direction of Norm Nemrow and with the assistance of BYU’s Center for Instructional Design, the SOA has also developed the "Value-Added Teaching Model", a CD-based program used to teach accounting that employs vector-based technology from Macromedia Flash. The reduction in lectures due to the CD supplement has proven effective in doubling student's interest in accounting as a major, and over 90 percent of students prefer the CD based approach over a traditional textbook/lecture approach.

BYU accounting faculty members and students, in conjunction with a Utah State University faculty member, developed a new set of accounting research rankings. The rankings are based on the authors' research and separately rank accounting institutions and accounting Ph.D. programs. The rankings build on prior research by (1) breaking accounting rankings into separate topical area and methodological rankings, (2) giving institutions research credit only for publications of faculty currently employed at the institution, and (3) providing rankings for three time windows.

== Rankings and awards ==
Source	Degree	Rank	Reference
Public Accounting Report	BSAcc	3	
U.S. News & World Report	BSAcc	3	
Wall Street Journal	BSAcc	1	
Public Accounting Report	MAcc	3	
U.S. News & World Report	MAcc	7	

For 2009, the bachelor's degree in the SOA received two #3 rankings, one by Public Accounting Report and the other by U.S. News & World Report. The same two reporting agencies also ranked the school's MAcc program #3 and #9 in the nation, respectively. In 2023, the undergraduate degree ranked 3rd and the MAcc program ranked 4th in the nation according to U.S. News & World Report.

The SOA is the only accounting program in the country to twice receive the American Accounting Association's Innovation in Accounting Education Award. The first award, received in 1993, was for the development of the Junior Core, and the second (2007) for development of the Ph.D. prep track.

== People ==
=== Faculty ===
- W. Steve Albrecht, president of the American Accounting Association (1997–1998); first president of the Association of Certified Fraud Examiners
- Kevin D. Stocks, president of the Federation of Schools of Accountancy (2000)

=== Alumni ===
The School of Accountancy has been highly successful at placing students upon graduating. In 2007, 97% of MAcc students had a job at the time of graduation and 100% of the MAcc students had a job within three months after graduation. In 2007, 89% of undergraduates had a job at the time of graduation and 97% had a job within three months after graduation. All four of the Big Four accounting firms as well as many national and regional firms recruit graduates. The Ph.D. Prep Track has been successful in placing into doctoral programs 100 percent of its graduates who have submitted applications.

Ph.D. Prep Track alumni are invited back to BYU to participate in the School of Accountancy's annual Accounting Research Symposium.

BYU alumni include many corporate executives, partners in CPA firms, and entrepreneurs.
