= List of Weber State University people =

The following is a partial list of notable Weber State University people. It includes alumni, professors, and others associated with Weber State University.

== Principals and presidents ==
Order	Name	Term
Principals of Weber Stake Academy
1	Louis F. Moench	(1888–1892)
2	Emil B. Isgreen	(1892–1893)
3	George F. Phillips	(1893–1894)
	Louis F. Moench	(1894–1902) — 2nd term
Principals of Weber Academy
4	David O. McKay	(1902–1908)
5	Wilford M. McKendrick	(1908–1910)
6	William W. Henderson	(1910–1914)
7	James L. Barker	(1914–1917)
8	Owen F. Beal	(1917–1918)
Presidents of Weber Normal College
1	Owen F. Beal	(1918-1919)
2	H. Aldous Dixon	(1919–1920)
3	Joel E. Ricks	(1920–1922)
Presidents of Weber College
4	Aaron W. Tracy	(1922–1935)
5	Leland W. Creer	(1935–1937)
	H. Aldous Dixon	(1937–1953) — 2nd term
6	William P. Miller	(1953–1962)
Presidents of Weber State College
	William P. Miller	(1962–1972)
7	Joseph L. Bishop	(1972–1978)
8	Rodney H. Brady	(1978–1985)
9	Fernelius, Elizabeth Anne	(2006-2012 Department of Dental Hygiene Sciences)
Presidents of Weber State University
10	Paul H. Thompson	(1990–2002)
11	F. Ann Millner	(2002–2012)
12	Charles A. Wight	(2013-2018)
acting	Norm Tarbox	(2018–2019)
13	Brad L. Mortensen	(2019–2025)

| 14 | Chris Mallett | (2026-)

== Alumni ==
=== Business ===
- Nolan D. Archibald - Former CEO of Black & Decker
- Bryan Brandenburg - Co-founder of Salt Lake Comic Con, Executive Producer Engineering Animation, Inc., co-founder of Sculptured Software
- Kevin Carmony - CEO of Linspire, Inc. - Outstanding Graduate (School of Business, 1983)
- Dee Hock - Creator of Visa Credit Card
- Nolan Karras - Non-executive member of the board of directors of Scottish Power
- J. Willard Marriott - Founder of Marriott International
- Barry Mower - Founder of Lifetime Products
- Chad Olson - CFO of Linspire, Inc.
- Robert Dotson - Former CEO of T-Mobile USA
- Alan W. Stock - Former CEO of Cinemark Theatres
- Jerry Moyes - Founder of Swift Transportation now part of Knight-Swift (NYSE:KNX) and former owner of the Phoenix Coyotes of the National Hockey League

=== Education ===
- Marilyn Arnold - emeritus professor of English at Brigham Young University
- Fawn M. Brodie - Historian and author
- Eric G. Swedin - author and professor at Weber State University

=== Entertainment ===
- Bill Allred - Radio Personality and host of Radio from Hell
- Paul W. Draper - mentalist and Anthropologist

=== Government ===
- Mark Evans Austad - Former Ambassador to Finland and Ambassador to Norway
- Lynn Jenkins - former Kansas state legislator and Kansas State Treasurer, and current U.S. Congresswoman from Kansas's 2nd congressional district.
- David M. Kennedy - Former United States Secretary of the Treasury
- Jill Parrish - Associate Justice of the Utah Supreme Court
- Richard Richards - Former Chair of the Republican National Committee under President Ronald Reagan.
- Richard H. Stallings - Former member United States House of Representatives
- Olene S. Walker - Utah State Governor/ First female to hold position.
- Greg Bell - Lieutenant Governor of Utah

=== Military ===
- George E. Wahlen - Medal of Honor Recipient George E. Wahlen
- Brian Miles Thacker - Medal of Honor Recipient

=== Religion ===
- Heber C. Jentzsch - President of the Church of Scientology International
- Boyd K. Packer - President of the Quorum of the Twelve Apostles of the Church of Jesus Christ of Latter-day Saints

=== Sports ===
- Robb Akey - college football head coach - Idaho Vandals
- Lance Allred - Professional basketball player and former NBA player, Cleveland Cavaliers
- Harold Arceneaux - Professional basketball player
- Larry Bergh - former ABA basketball player
- Mark Brewer - former NBA player for the Syracuse Nationals
- Jeff Carlson- Former NFL player
- Charles Clinger - second highest High Jump in the world from 2001 to 2003
- Bob Davis - Former NBA basketball player
- J.D. Folsom - Former NFL linebacker, for the Miami Dolphins
- Eddie Gill - Former NBA point guard for the NBA Indiana Pacers
- Halvor Hagen - NFL Offensive lineman, for the Buffalo Bills
- David Hale - Former NFL Offensive lineman, for the Baltimore Ravens
- Rob Hitchcock - Former CFL player, Hamilton Tiger-Cats, Edmonton Eskimos
- Ben Howland - college basketball head coach - UCLA Bruins
- Dick Hunsaker - college basketball head coach - Utah Valley University
- Taron Johnson — NFL Defensive back for the Buffalo Bills
- Damian Lillard - NBA guard for the Portland Trail Blazers and unanimous 2012-13 NBA Rookie of the Year.
- Al Lolotai - NFL Offensive lineman, for the Washington Redskins
- Marcus Mailei - Former NFL Fullback, for the New Orleans Saints
- Jamie Martin - Former NFL quarterback, 1991 Walter Payton Award
- Ken McEachern- Former CFL Defensive back for the Saskatchewan Roughriders and the Toronto Argonauts; All-Star in 1980–81, won the 1983 Grey Cup with the Argonauts, awarded the Tom Pate Memorial Award
- Court McGee - wrestler; professional mixed martial artist, Won The Ultimate Fighter 11, UFC Welterweight
- Pat McQuistan - NFL Offensive lineman, for the Dallas Cowboys
- Paul McQuistan - NFL Offensive lineman, for the Seattle Seahawks
- Ruben Nembhard - Former NBA basketball player
- Paul Pilkington - Former world class marathon runner. Major marathon wins include '90 Houston and '96 Los Angeles
- Darryl Pollard - Former NFL player Cornerback, for the San Francisco 49ers
- Alfred Pupunu - Former NFL football player. Scored touchdown in Super Bowl XXIX for the San Diego Chargers
- Roger Ruzek - NFL placekicker, for the Dallas Cowboys
- Cam Quayle - 1998 NFL draft Mr. Irrelevant.
- Bill Schuffenhauer - 3x Olympian, competed in 2002/2006/2010 Olympics and took silver in the 2002 Winter Olympics in Park City, UT in bobsleigh for Team USA.
- Bo Smith - CFL Cornerback, for the Hamilton Tiger-Cats
- John L. Smith - college football head coach at Arkansas, Michigan State, Louisville, Utah State, & Idaho
- Bob Sneddon - NFL cornerback, for the Washington Redskins
- Willie Sojourner - Former NBA/ABA basketball player
- Dan Sparks - Former NBA/ABA basketball player
- Chris Sulages, college football coach
- Justus Thigpen - Former NBA/ABA basketball player
- John Thompson - Former NFL Tight end, for the Green Bay Packers
- Tim Toone - 2010 Mr. Irrelevant* NFL Wide receiver, member of the Atlanta Falcons
- Dimitri Tsoumpas - CFL Offensive lineman, for the Calgary Stampeders
- Lee White - Former NFL player
- Greg Whisman - Former PGA Tour player, 1991–1993.
- Rashid Shaheed - [NFL] Wide Receiver, New Orleans Saints
