= William Williams Henderson =

William Williams Henderson (May 23, 1879 – October 31, 1944) was an early influential American educator in Utah. He was principal of Weber Academy in Ogden, Utah, from 1909 to 1913, president of Brigham Young College in Logan, Utah, from 1919 to 1926, and head of the zoology and entomology department at Utah State Agricultural College from 1926 to 1944.

Henderson was born in Clarkston, Utah, to James and Mary Watkins Williams Henderson. In 1901 he married Survina Wheeler.

Henderson graduated from Brigham Young College in 1903. He then received a master's degree from Cornell University in 1905 and a PhD in philosophy from the University of California, Berkeley in 1925.

== Sources ==
- Andrew Jenson. LDS Biographical Encyclopedia. Vol. 4, p. 580

Academic offices
Preceded by Wilford M. McKendrick	President of Weber State University; 1910 – 1914	Succeeded by James L. Barker
