= Gene Dalton =

American organizational theorist (1928–1997)

Gene Wray Dalton (July 24, 1928 – January 7, 1997) was a professor of organizational behavior at Harvard Business School and later at Brigham Young University (BYU).

Dalton was born in Pocatello, Idaho to Dell Moroni Dalton and his wife the former Rachel Wray. He was an alumnus of Pocatello High School. Dalton served as a missionary for the Church of Jesus Christ of Latter-day Saints in the Central States Mission. He earned a bachelor's degree in accounting from the University of Utah. He was than an accounting instructor at Idaho State University before joining the Air Force ROTC in 1955 and studying at Brigham Young University. He then went on to receive a Doctorate of Business Administration degree from Harvard Business School.

From 1983-1987 Dalton was the chair of BYU's Department of Organizational Behavior.

The Marriott School of Management has a scholarship named after Dalton.

Among other positions in the LDS Church Dalton served as a stake president.

Dalton was married to the former Bonnie LaRae Berrett. They were the parents of eight daughters.

== Publications ==
- Novations: Strategies for Career Management with Paul H. Thompson, 1986.
- The Distribution of Authority in Formal Organizations with Abraham Zaleznik and Louis B. Barnes.
- Motivation and Control in Organizations with Paul R. Lawrence and Jay Lorsch.

== Sources ==
- Ernest L. Wilkinson, ed., Brigham Young University: The First 100 Years (Provo: BYU Press, 1976) Vol. 4, p. 107.
- article on Paul R. Lawrence
- history of BYU's Department of Organizational Behavior
