= Stephen D. Nadauld =

American academic and LDS leader

Second Quorum of the Seventy
- April 6, 1991 – October 5, 1996
- Called by: Ezra Taft Benson
- End reason: Honorably released

Personal details
- Born: Stephen Douglas Nadauld; May 31, 1942 (age 84); Idaho Falls, Idaho, United States
- Education: BSChem at Brigham Young University; M.B.A at Harvard Business School; Ph.D. in finance at University of California at Berkeley
- Spouse(s): Margaret Dyreng
- Children: 7 sons
- Parents: Sterling Dwaine Nadauld and Lois Madsen Nadauld Corey

Stephen Douglas Nadauld (born May 31, 1942) is an American academic, the former president of Dixie State University and Weber State University (WSU). Nadauld was a general authority of the Church of Jesus Christ of Latter-day Saints (LDS Church) from 1991 to 1996.

Nadauld was born in Idaho Falls, Idaho to Sterling Dwaine Nadauld and Lois Madsen Nadauld Corey. From 1961 to 1964, he was a missionary for the LDS Church in France, where he became a fluent speaker of French.

Nadauld obtained a bachelor's degree in chemistry from Brigham Young University (BYU), an MBA from Harvard Business School, and a Ph.D. in finance from the University of California at Berkeley (UC Berkeley). Nadauld was a faculty member at the University of Utah (1970–72) and UC Berkeley (1973–76). In 1976, he became a faculty member at BYU, where he eventually became the head of the school's MBA program. In 1983, he left BYU for private sector opportunities, including a period of time as the CEO of a dairy cooperative and CFO of Bonneville Pacific Corporation. He was also president of Weber State College (now WSU) in Ogden, Utah, for five years. During his tenure, Nadauld was instrumental in Weber State's preparations to become a university. In 1991, Nadauld was awarded an honorary doctorate degree from WSU.

In 1991, Nadauld became a member of the LDS Church's Second Quorum of the Seventy, a full-time ecclesiastical appointment. For his entire tenure as a general authority, Nadauld was a counselor to Jack H. Goaslind in the general presidency of the church's Young Men organization. He served as a general authority until 1996, when he again returned to BYU as a professor of business management. From 2003 to 2006, Nadauld took a leave of absence from BYU to serve as president of the church's Switzerland Geneva Mission. Following this service, Nadauld returned as a faculty member at BYU.

On March 22, 2010, Nadauld was inaugurated as the 17th president of Dixie State College in St. George, Utah, after serving since March 27, 2008, as its interim president. During his presidency, the institution transitioned from a college to a university, formally being designated as such in February 2013. He retired at the end of the 2013–14 academic year.

Nadauld is the author of two books on spiritual LDS Church-related themes. He is married to Margaret Dyreng, who was the general president of the LDS Church's Young Women organization from 1997 to 2002. They are the parents of seven sons. Nadauld is the nephew of singer Eve Young.

== Publications ==
- Stephen D. Nadauld (2001). Justified by Faith (Salt Lake City, Utah: Deseret Book) ISBN 1-57345-831-7
- —— (1999). Principles of Priesthood Leadership (Salt Lake City, Utah: Bookcraft) ISBN 1-57008-622-2

Academic offices
Preceded by Rodney H. Brady	President of Weber State College; 1985–1990	Succeeded by Paul H. Thompson
Preceded by Lee G. Caldwell	President of Dixie State College of Utah; 2008–2014	Succeeded by Richard B. Williams
