= Lee Tom Perry =

Lee Tom Perry (born April 29, 1951) is a business professor, Latter-day Saint church leader, and hymnwriter.

He is the son of L. Tom Perry, who was a member of the Quorum of the Twelve Apostles of the Church of Jesus Christ of Latter-day Saints (LDS Church) from 1974 until his death in 2015.

As a young man, Perry served an LDS Church mission in the Japan West Mission. He was associate dean of the Marriott School of Management at Brigham Young University (BYU) from 1998 to 2005. From 1991 to 1994, he served as president of the BYU 3rd Stake. From 2005 to 2008, Perry was president of the California Roseville Mission, and from 2010 to 2014 he was a member of the general board of the LDS Church's Sunday School.

Perry wrote the words to "As Now We Take The Sacrament", which is hymn number 169 in the 1985 English LDS Church hymnal.

== Career ==
Perry holds a doctorate in administration sciences from Yale University. He entered Yale in the second year of its graduate program in management. After obtaining a Ph.D. in 1981, Perry took a position as a professor at Purdue University. Perry was the Sorenson Family Professor of Organizational Leadership and Strategy at BYU. Starting in 1995, Perry and Alton Wade co-chaired a newly formed BYU service-learning committee. He was again appointed as an associate dean of the Marriott School in July 2012. On July 1, 2013, Perry was appointed dean of the Marriott School of Management at BYU, succeeding Gary C. Cornia. In August 2017, it was renamed to the Marriott School of Business, with significant renames in departments and realignment of majors. This process also involved rebranding from a short form name of Marriott School to BYU Marriott.

== Personal life ==
Perry and his wife, Carolyn, are the parents of six children. Perry wrote a biography of his father L. Tom Perry: An Uncommon Life, Years of Preparation, 1922-1976. This was part of a planned two part biography, which was released in 2019. He also has written the book Righteous Influence: What Every Leader Should Know About Drawing on the Powers of Heaven.
