= Bishop Joseph =

Bishop Joseph may refer to:

- John Joseph (bishop) (1932–1998), Roman Catholic Bishop of Faisalabad
- Rayappu Joseph (born 1940), former Roman Catholic Bishop of Mannar

== See also ==
- Joseph Bishop (born 1932), academic administrator and author
