= Steve Comisar =

American con man

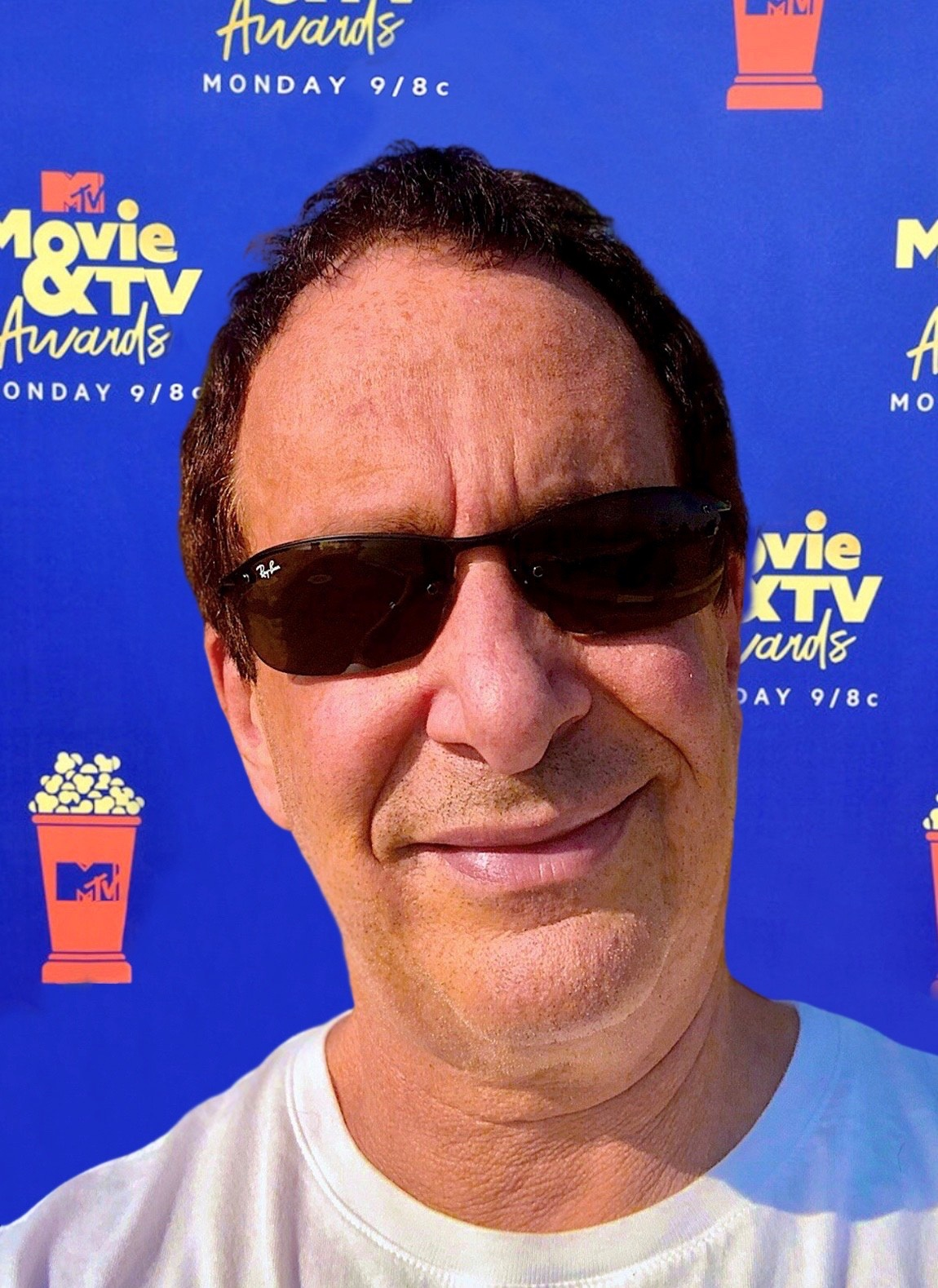
- Comisar in 2020
- Born: Steven Robert Comisar; December 30, 1961 (age 64)
- Other names: Brett Champion
- Occupation: Con man

Steven Robert Comisar (born December 30, 1961) is an American con artist who was arrested multiple times and convicted of a variety of frauds. This includes convictions in 1983, 1990, and 1994 in Los Angeles Federal Court. In 1999, he was arrested for swindling investors in a fake television quiz show project he promoted as involving Joe Namath. For this, he was sentenced to thirty-three months in prison. Earlier in his life, as a young man, Comisar marketed a "solar powered clothes dryer" in national magazines for $49.95. Buyers received a length of clothesline.

After release from prison on April 27, 2018, Comisar claimed to be reformed, used the alias Brett Champion, and promoted himself as a fraud prevention expert and consultant. He used this name on Dateline NBC, and in other television appearances. He also wrote the book America's Guide to Fraud Prevention under this name.

As a result of subsequent convictions, Comisar is now legally prohibited from using this alias, and from referring to himself as a consumer fraud expert. His book is considered a "piece of fraud history" by the Association of Certified Fraud Examiners, and is on display in their fraud museum.
