= John Cederquist =

American artist (born 1946)

- Born: July 7, 1946 (age 80)
- Education: Long Beach State College
- Known for: Sculpture
- Website: http://www.johncederquist.com/

'Little Wave', wood, epoxy resin, aniline dye, metal and oil-based lithography ink work by John Cederquist, 1990-1991, Metropolitan Museum of Art

John Carl Cederquist (born August 7, 1946) is an American sculptor in wood and builder of studio furniture who was born in Altadena, California. He graduated from Long Beach State College with a BA in 1969 and an MA in 1971.

Cederquist is best known for his playful, trompe-l'œil wood assemblages―often in the form of pieces of furniture―that blur the distinctions between reality and illusion. He often employs cartoon-like drawings and skewed perspectives. Since 1976, he has taught at Saddleback College in Mission Viejo, California.
