= N. Eldon Tanner Building =

Marriott School of Business building at Brigham Young University

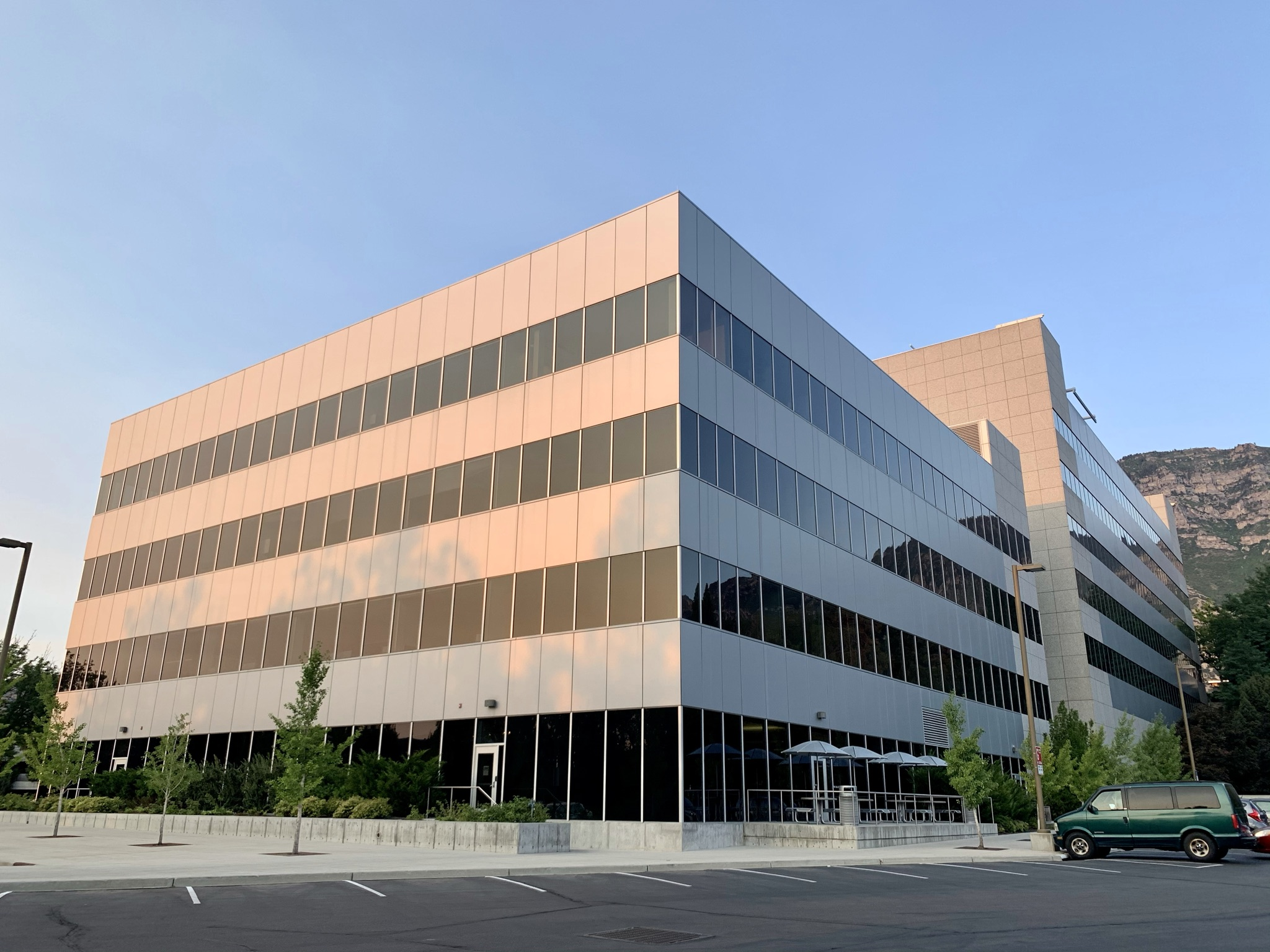
- Interactive map of the N. Eldon Tanner Building area

General information
- Type: Educational
- Location: Brigham Young University; Provo, Utah; United States
- Coordinates: 40°15′1.59″N 111°39′9.33″W
- Construction started: 1980
- Completed: 1983

The N. Eldon Tanner Building, also known as the TNRB, is a building that houses classrooms and administrative offices for the Marriott School of Business on the Brigham Young University (BYU) campus in Provo, Utah, United States.

== Background ==
On March 18, 1980, during a devotional assembly, BYU president Dallin H. Oaks announced a decision by the Board of Trustees to construct a new campus management building that would be named in honor of N. Eldon Tanner, a Canadian politician and counselor to four presidents of the Church of Jesus Christ of Latter-day Saints. Administrators say that the business school's main building was named after Tanner because he was known in Canada as "Mr. Integrity" — a title wished upon every Marriott School graduate.

The Tanner Building was completed in late 1982 and dedicated on April 5, 1983, by Gordon B. Hinckley. Today, the seven-story, 120,000 square feet (11,000 m^{2}) granite building houses Marriott School classes, professors' offices and administration. A 76,000 square feet (7,100 m^{2}) addition, costing $43 million and funded by donations, was dedicated on October 24, 2008, by Thomas S. Monson.

== Public suicide attempt ==
On December 3, 2018, around 9:00 a.m., a student publicly attempted suicide by jumping from the fourth floor of the Tanner Building atrium. The student was critically injured as a result of the fall and died two days later on December 5, 2018. The suicide attempt initiated campus-wide discussions about the availability of mental health resources on BYU campus. In response to the suicide, BYU bolstered mental health resources on campus and installed floor-to-ceiling glass walls along the perimeter of the atrium to prevent similar incidents from occurring.

== See also ==
- List of Brigham Young University buildings
