= Paul H. Thompson =

President of Weber State University
- In office 1990–2002
- Preceded by: Stephen D. Nadauld
- Succeeded by: F. Ann Millner

Personal details
- Born: Warren, Utah
- Spouse: Carolyn
- Children: 6
- Education: DBA (1969)
- Alma mater: University of Utah; Harvard University
- Occupation: Educator, administrator

Paul H. Thompson is an American educator and administrator.

== Biography ==
Thompson was born and raised in Warren, Utah. He received his bachelor's degree from the University of Utah in 1964.

Thompson received a doctorate in business administration from Harvard University in 1969. From 1969 to 1973, he was an assistant professor at the Harvard Business School. He began work at Brigham Young University in 1973, serving there as professor of Organizational Behavior, chairman of the Department of Organizational Behavior, assistant dean of the Graduate School of Management, dean of the Marriott School of Management, and as vice president of Development and University Relations. He served as president of Weber State University from 1990 to 2002.

Following his service at Weber State he was called by the Church of Jesus Christ of Latter-day Saints as president of the Massachusetts Boston Mission.

Thompson co-authored a book on management with Gene Dalton in 1986. They first co-authored an article on management practices in 1970.

Academic offices
Preceded by Office Created (transition from college to university)	President of Weber State University; 1990 – 2002	Succeeded by F. Ann Millner
