= Louis E. Kirstein =

American businessman and philanthropist

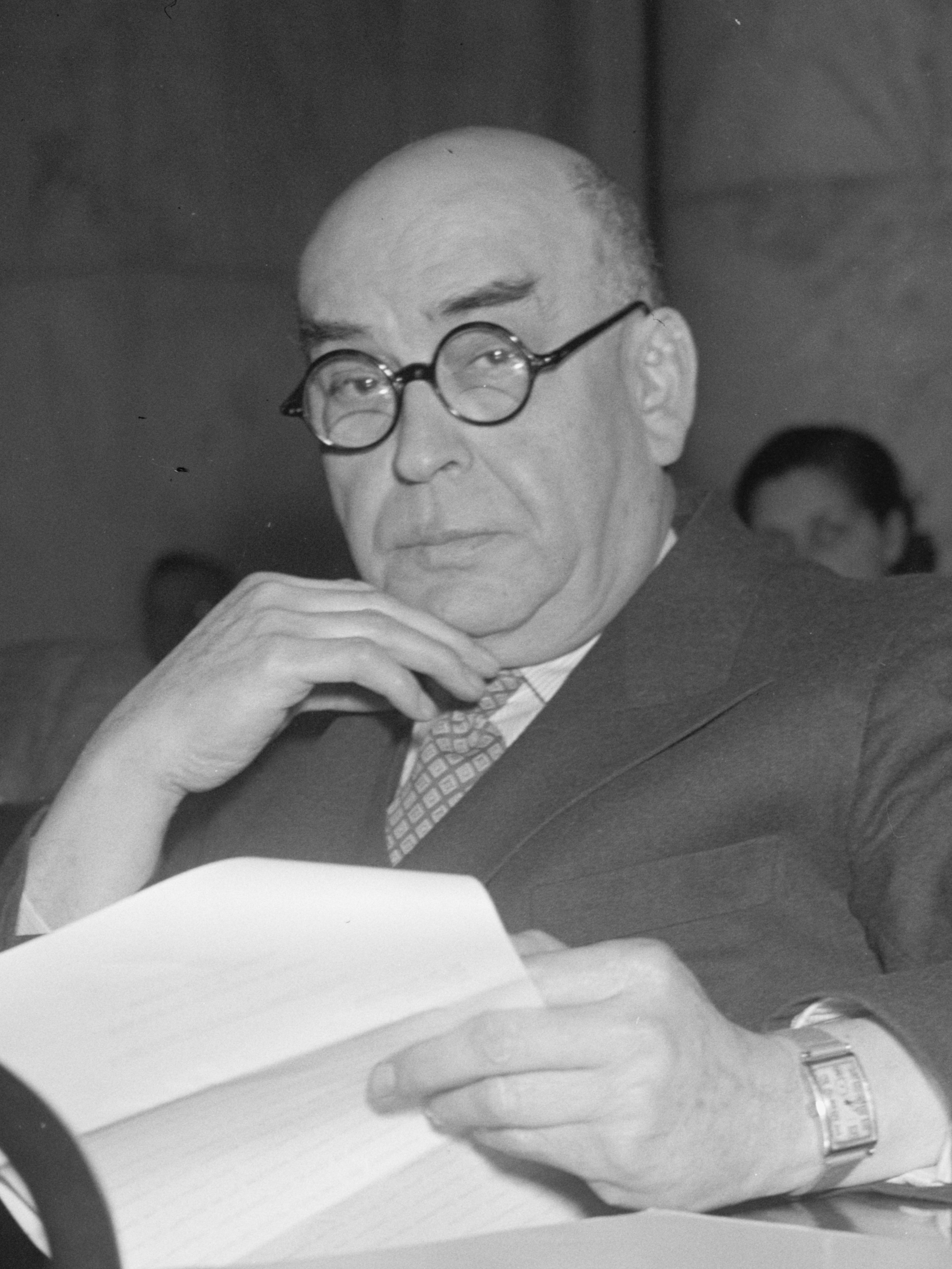
- Kirstein in 1938
- Born: Louis Edward Kirstein; June 9, 1867; Rochester, New York, U.S.
- Died: December 10, 1942 (aged 75); Boston, Massachusetts, U.S.
- Occupation(s): Businessman, philanthropist
- Spouse: Rose Stein
- Children: 3

Louis Edward Kirstein (June 9, 1867 – December 10, 1942) was an American businessman and philanthropist. He was the chairman of Filene's, a Boston-based department store. He was "one of the foremost merchants and commercial leaders in New England," and "one of the outstanding leaders of American Jewry."

== Early life ==
Kirstein was born on June 9, 1867, in Rochester, New York. His father, Edward Kirstein, was an immigrant from Germany who first worked as a peddler and eventually owned an optics store in Rochester. His mother was Jeanette Leiter. His uncle owned a clothing manufacturing company in Rochester, the Stein-Bloch Co. Kirstein left school at 13.

== Career ==
Kirstein began his career by working in the baseball industry. He hired John McGraw to play in Florida for $50 a month. He subsequently purchased the Rochester Ball Club. In 1890, he worked as a peripatetic salesman for his father; four years later, he worked in the same capacity for his uncle.

Kirstein became a major investor and vice president of Filene's, a department store headquartered in Boston, in 1912. He subsequently became its chairman. He also served on the boards of directors of Abraham & Straus, Lazarus, Bloomingdale's, R. H. White, and the Federated Department Stores (now known as Macy's, Inc.). He often negotiated with organized labor and encouraged other businessmen to do the same. He became "one of the foremost merchants and commercial leaders in New England."

Kirstein was the co-founder and chairman of the American Retail Federation. He served on the Massachusetts Industrial Commission, the National Labor Board as well as on the Business Advisory Council of the United States Department of Commerce. He also served on the Industrial Advisory Board of the New Deal's National Recovery Administration. He was a charter member of the Business Historical Society.

== Philanthropy ==
Kirstein was the founder and president of the Associated Jewish Philanthropies of Boston. He was also the chairman of the General Committee of the American Jewish Committee, and the honorary national chairman of the United Jewish Appeal. Additionally, he served as a director of the National Jewish Welfare Board. He was the president of the Graduate School for Jewish Social Work, now known as the Wurzweiler School of Social Work at Yeshiva University. He was also a member of the National Conference of Jews and Christians. Additionally, he served on the visiting committee of the Semitic Museum, and he supported the Beth Israel Hospital. He became known as "one of the outstanding leaders of American Jewry."

Kirstein joined the board of the Boston Public Library in 1919, and he served as its president five times. He was also associated with the Boston Community Fund. He was awarded an honorary master of arts degree from Harvard University in 1933 and an honorary doctorate of commercial science from Boston University in 1938. He became associated with the Harvard Business School, where a professorship (now held by Jay Lorsch) was named in his honor.

== Personal life and death ==
Kirstein married Rose Stein, whose father worked for his uncle's company. They had two sons and a daughter. He died of pneumonia on December 10, 1942, in Boston. His papers are held at the Harvard Business School's Baker Library.

The Kirsteins had a second home in the North Shore. In 1914, Louis Kirstein bought the Peabody estate in Salem to develop the Kernwood Country Club.
