= Paul Lawrence (sociologist) =

Business theorist from Rochelle, Illinois

Paul Roger Lawrence (April 26, 1922 – November 1, 2011) was an American sociologist, Professor of Organizational Behavior at the Harvard Business School, and consultant, known from his work with Jay W. Lorsch on "Differentiation and integration in complex organizations."

== Biography ==
Born in Rochelle, Illinois, Lawrence obtained his A.B. from Albion College in 1943, and after World War II at Harvard Business School his MBA in 1947 and his PhD in 1950.

After graduation Lawrence started his lifelong academic career at Harvard University in 1947 as Instructor. He was appointed assistant professor in 1950, Associate Professor in 1956, and Full Professor in 1960. From 1967 to 1991 he was Wallace Brett Donham Professor of Organizational Behavior. He has been visiting professor at the Massachusetts Institute of Technology in 1973, and at the University of California, Berkeley in 1984. From 1975 to 1993 he has also been Director at Millipore Corporation, and from 1991 to 1995 Director at the Hollingsworth & Vose Paper Company.

Lawrence was elected Fellow of the Academy of Management, and of the International Academy of Management, and member of the American Sociological Association and the Society for the Advancement of Socio-Economics.

== Bibliography ==
=== Books ===
- Ulrich, David N.; Lawrence, Paul R.; Booz, Donald Robert (1950). Management Behavior and Foreman Attitude: A Case Study. Harvard University.
- Ronken, Harriet O.; Lynton, Harriet Ronken; Lawrence, Paul R. (1952). Administering Changes: A Case Study of Human Relations in a Factory. Harvard University, Division of Research, Graduate School of Business Administration. ISBN 978-0-8371-6437-3.
- Lawrence, Paul R. (1958). The Changing of Organizational Behavior Patterns: A Case Study of Decentralization. Harvard University, Graduate School of Business Administration, Division of Research.
- Lawrence, Paul R. (1961). Organizational behavior and administration: cases, concepts, and research findings. Dorsey Press.
- Turner, Arthur Nicholson; Lawrence, Paul R. (1965). Industrial Jobs and the Worker: An Investigation of Response to Task Attributes. Harvard University, Division of Research, Graduate School of Business Administration.
- Lawrence, Paul R.; Lorsch, Jay W. (1969). Developing organizations: diagnosis and action. Addison-Wesley series on organization development. Reading, Mass.: Addison-Wesley. ISBN 978-0-201-04204-7.
- Dalton, Gene W.; Lawrence, Paul, eds. (1971). Motivation and Control in Organizations. R. D. Irwin.
- Lorsch, Jay William; Lawrence, Paul R., eds. (1972). Managing Group and Intergroup Relations. R. D. Irwin.
- Kotter, John P.; Lawrence, Paul R. (1974). Mayors in action: five approaches to urban governance. Wiley series in urban research. New York: Wiley. ISBN 978-0-471-50540-2.
- Davis, Stanley M.; Lawrence, Paul R. (1977). Matrix. Addison-Wesley series on organization development. Reading, Mass: Addison-Wesley Pub. Co. ISBN 978-0-201-01115-9.
- Lawrence, Paul R.; Dyer, Davis (1983). Renewing American industry. New York: Free Press; London: Collier Macmillan Publishers. ISBN 978-0-02-918170-6.
- Lawrence, Paul R.; Lorsch, Jay William (1986). Organization and environment: managing differentiation and integration. Boston: Harvard Business School Press. ISBN 978-0-87584-129-8.
- Lawrence, Paul R.; Vlachoutsicos, Charalambos A., eds. (1990). Behind the factory walls: decision making in Soviet and US enterprises. Boston, Mass: Harvard Business School Press. ISBN 978-0-87584-224-0.
- Etzioni, Amitai; Lawrence, Paul R., eds. (1991). Socio-economics: Toward a New Synthesis. Florence: Taylor and Francis. ISBN 978-1-315-49011-3.
- Abramson, Mark A.; Lawrence, Paul R., eds. (2001). Transforming organizations. The PricewaterhouseCoopers endowment series on the business of government. Lanham, MD: Rowman & Littlefield Publishers. ISBN 978-0-7425-1314-3.
- Lawrence, Paul R.; Nohria, Nitin (2002). Driven: how human nature shapes our choices. Warren Bennis signature series. San Francisco: Jossey-Bass. ISBN 978-0-7879-5785-8.
- Lawrence, Paul R. (2010). Driven to lead: good, bad, and misguided leadership. Warren Bennis signature series. San Francisco: Jossey-Bass. ISBN 978-0-470-62384-8.

=== Selected articles ===
- Lawrence, Paul R., and Jay W. Lorsch. "Differentiation and integration in complex organizations." Administrative science quarterly (1967): 1-47.
- Lawrence, Paul R., and Jay W. Lorsch. "Managing differentiation and integration." Organization and environment (1967).
- Johnston, Russell, and Paul R. Lawrence. "Beyond vertical integration–the rise of the value-adding partnership." Thompson, G.(et al.)(Eds.), Markets, hierarchies and networks, The Coordination of Social Life, Sage, London (1991): 193–202.

== Archives and records ==
- Paul R. Lawrence papers at Baker Library Special Collections, Harvard Business School.
