= Jeffrey B. Welch =

American businessman

Jeffrey B. Welch (born 1954) is Senior Vice President of Krispy Kreme as well as President of the company's international development. He has been an executive at Krispy Kreme since 2004.

Welch is a graduate of the Marriott School of Management, Brigham Young University.
