= W. Steve Albrecht =

American accountant

W. Steve Albrecht is the Andersen Alumni Professor at the Marriott School of Business (MSB) of Brigham Young University (BYU). He is a former president of both the American Accounting Association (AAA) and the Association of Certified Fraud Examiners (ACFE). He was also formerly an associate dean of the MSB. Albrecht served as a mission president for the Church of Jesus Christ of Latter-day Saints in Tokyo, Japan.

Albrecht has a bachelor's degree in accounting from BYU and a Ph.D. in accounting and an M.B.A. from the University of Wisconsin–Madison. He was a professor at the University of Illinois before he joined the BYU faculty in 1977. He was also previously an employee of Deloitte & Touche.

Albrecht is a certified public accountant, a Certified Internal Auditor, and a Certified Fraud Examiner.

From 1990 to 1998, Albrecht was the director of BYU's School of Accounting.

Albrecht was president of the ACFE from 1989 to 1992 and president of the AAA from 1997 to 1998. The American Institute of Certified Public Accountants awarded him the Distinguished Achievement in Accounting Education Award in 2001.

Albrecht has served on the boards of directors of SkyWest Airlines, Cypress Semiconductor, Red Hat, Inc., ICON Health & Fitness and Bonneville International.

Dr. Albrecht is also the author of many books including the best-selling textbook series Fraud Examination (now in its 7th Edition)

Albrecht is married to the former LeAnn Christiansen. They are the parents of six children. He and his wife live in Bicknell, Utah where he serves on the town council.
