= Lewis W. Shurtliff =

American politician (1835–1922)

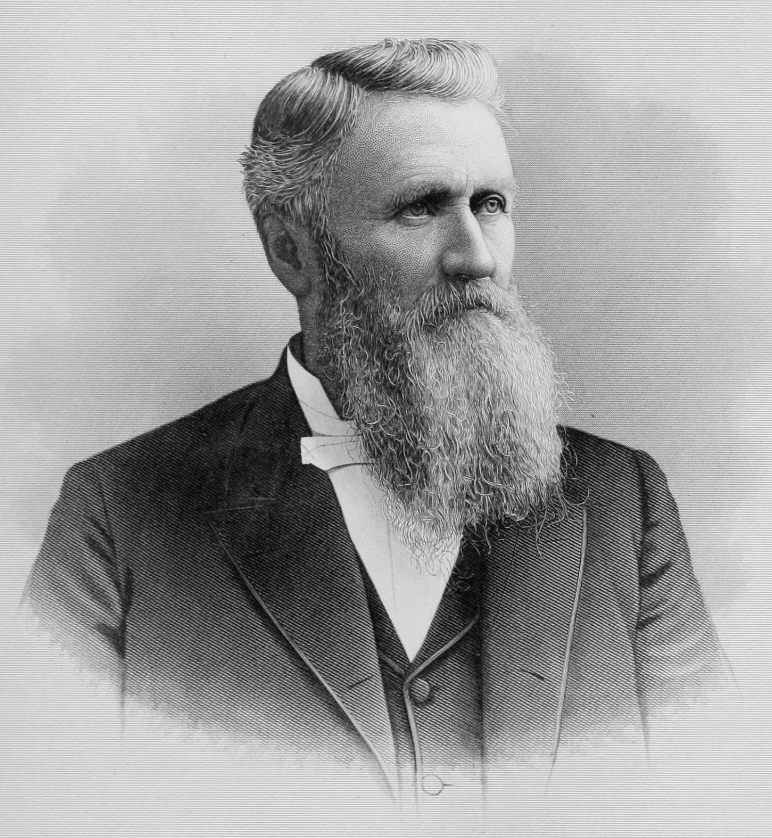

Lewis Warren Shurtliff (July 24, 1835 – May 2, 1922) was a Utah politician and a missionary and leader in the Church of Jesus Christ of Latter-day Saints (LDS Church).

== Biography ==
Shurtliff was born in Sullivan, Ohio. As an infant, his parents joined the Church of Jesus Christ of Latter-day Saints; the family followed Joseph Smith to Kirtland, Ohio; Far West, Missouri; and Nauvoo, Illinois. In 1851, the Shurtliff family travelled to Utah Territory as Mormon pioneers and settled in Weber County.

In 1855 to 1858, Shurtliff was a Mormon missionary to the Native Americans in present-day Salmon River, Idaho. In 1867, he went on a mission to England, Scotland, Wales, Denmark, Norway, Sweden, Germany, France, and Italy.

Shurtliff returned to Utah Territory and became the LDS Church Bishop in Plain City. In 1883, he became the president of the church's Weber Stake, which was based on Ogden. Also in 1883, Shurtliff was invited to join the church's Council of Fifty.

In 1886 and 1888, Shurtliff was elected to the Utah Territorial Council. After Utah gained statehood in 1896, Shurtliff was a State Senator from 1896 to 1899. He was initially elected as a Democrat but later became a Republican. Shurtliff also served as a Weber County Commissioner and as a Weber County probate judge. In 1904 Shurtliff served as the 1st Vice president of the 12th National Irrigation Congress.

In 1896, the Utah settlement of Salt Creek was renamed Warren to honor Shurtliff.

Shurtliff died in Ogden, Utah. One of Shurtliff's daughters, Louie Emily Shurtliff, married Joseph Fielding Smith, who after her death went on to become an apostle and later the President of the LDS Church.
