= Romney Institute of Public Service and Ethics =

Academic unit at Brigham Young University

- Parent institution: Marriott School of Management
- Affiliations: The Church of Jesus Christ of Latter-day Saints; Brigham Young University
- Location: Provo, Utah, USA; 40°15′2″N 111°39′8″W
- Campus: Brigham Young University
- Website: marriottschool.byu.edu/mpa/

The Romney Institute of Public Service and Ethics (Romney Institute) at Brigham Young University is a department within the Marriott School of Management. The school offers a master's degree in public administration through both pre-service and executive programs.

== History ==
The Romney Institute of Public Service and Ethics was named in 1998 for three-term Michigan governor, United States Secretary of Housing and Urban Development, and Presidential Medal of Freedom Recipient George W. Romney.

== Academics ==
=== Rankings and admissions ===
In the 2022 edition of the U.S. News Best Graduate School Rankings, the MPA Program ranked No. 48.

== People ==
=== Alumni ===
- Carl Hernandez III, Professor, J. Reuben Clark Law School
- Marsha Judkins, Utah Congresswoman, 61st District (2018-present); Adjunct Professor, Utah Valley University
- Matt Salmon, U.S. Congressman, Arizona (1995-2001; 2013-2017)
- Paul M. Warner, U.S. Attorney, District of Utah (1998-2006), U.S. Magistrate Judge, District of Utah (2006–present)
