= Ann Millner =

American politician

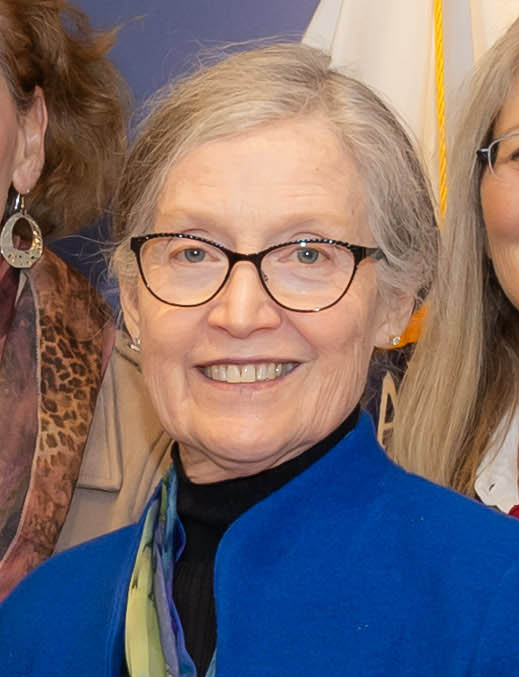
- Ann Millner in 2023

Member of the Utah Senate
- Incumbent
- Assumed office January 1, 2015
- Preceded by: Stuart Reid
- Constituency: 18th district (2015–2023); 5th district (2023–present)

11th President of Weber State University
- In office 2002–2012
- Preceded by: Paul H. Thompson
- Succeeded by: Charles A. Wight

Personal details
- Born: Middlesboro, Kentucky
- Party: Republican
- Education: University of Tennessee (B.S.); Southwest Texas State University (M.S.); Brigham Young University (Ed.D.)

Flora Ann Millner is an American politician, and former university administrator. A Republican, Millner is a member of the Utah State Senate representing the state's 5th District since 2023. She previously represented the 18th District starting in 2015. She was previously the 11th president of Weber State University from 2002 to 2012, having been appointed to that role after 20 years of serving the university as an educator and administrator.

== Biography ==
Millner was born in Middlesboro, Kentucky, to Gordon D. Millner, a tenant farmer, and Sue Burkhart Millner, a medical technologist. She received a B.S. in Education from the University of Tennessee, an M.S. in Allied Health Education and Management from Southwest Texas State University, and an Ed.D. in Educational Administration from Brigham Young University (BYU) in 1986.

Millner then worked in a variety of positions at educational institutions. She was Education Coordinator of the Medical Technology Program at Vanderbilt University, Instructional Developer in Medical Technology at Thomas Jefferson University, a lecturer at the School of Health Professions, Southwest Texas State University, and associate director of Continuing Education at the Edmonda Campus of Gwynedd Mercy College. She began employment at Weber State College in 1982, and held such positions as Director of Outreach Education in the School of Allied Health Sciences, Assistant Vice President for Community Partnerships, Associate Dean of Continuing Education, and in 1993 she became vice president for University Relations.

Millner has been involved in various community and academic organizations. She is the current chair of the Utah Campus Compact and a board member for Intermountain Health Care, the Ogden/Weber Chamber of Commerce, the Weber Economic Development Corporation, and Coalition for Utah's Future. She has been a member of the NCAA I-AA/I-AAA Presidential Advisory Group, the Council of State Representatives for the American Association of State Colleges and Universities, and the Ogden Rotary Club. A Baptist, she is the only Republican in the Utah legislature who is not a member of the Church of Jesus Christ of Latter-day Saints.

== Political career ==
In 2014, Millner ran for the State Senate seat in Utah's 18th district. She defeated Democrat Mat Wenzel, and has been serving as a Senator since 2015. In the Senate, Millner sits on the following committees:

- Business, Economic Development, and Labor Appropriations Subcommittee
- Higher Education Appropriations Subcommittee
- Senate Education Committee
- Senate Economic Development and Workforce Services committee

=== Election results ===
2022 Utah State Senate election District 5
Party	Candidate	Votes	%
Republican	Ann Millner	19,336	64.4
Democratic	Michael Blodgett	10,695	35.6

2018 Utah State Senate election District 18
Party	Candidate	Votes	%
Republican	Ann Millner	20,278	63.6
Democratic	Jason Yu	2,489	29.8
Libertarian	Kevin Bryan	2,095	6.6

2014 Utah State Senate election District 18
Party	Candidate	Votes	%
Republican	Ann Millner	11,603	73.6
Democratic	Mat Wenzel	4,155	26.4

== Legislation ==
=== 2016 sponsored bills ===
Bill Title and Number	Bill Status
S.B. 41 Appointment of County Assessors	Governor Signed 3/25/2016
S.B. 51 Teacher Leader Role	Governor Signed 3/28/2016
S.B. 67 Partnerships for Student Success	Governor Signed 3/28/2016
S.B. 78 State Board of Education Candidate Selection	Governor Signed 3/17/2016
S.B. 101 High Quality School Readiness Program Expansion	Governor Signed 3/28/2016
S.B. 103 Strategic Workforce Investments	Governor Signed 3/28/2016
S.B. 109 School and Institutional Trust Lands Amendments	Governor Signed 3/22/2016
S.B. 149 School Grading Modifications	Governor Signed 3/28/2016
S.B. 166 Utah Science, Technology, and Research Modifications	Governor Signed 3/23/2016
S.B. 191 School Turnaround and Leadership Development Act Amendments	Governor Signed 3/23/2016
S.J.R. 12 Proposal to Amend Utah Constitution -- Changes to School Funds	Senate/To Lieutenant Governor 3/16/2016

=== Notable legislation ===
During Utah's 2016 legislative session, the Senate passed Senate Bill 149, sponsored by Millner, which will allow Utah's grading system to adjust automatically as student proficiency improves.

Academic offices
Preceded by Paul H. Thompson	President of Weber State University; 2002 – 2012	Succeeded by Charles A. Wight
