= Ned C. Hill =

- Born: 1945 (age 80–81)
- Education: B.S. (1969) Chemistry; M.S. (1971) Chemistry; Ph.D. (1976) Finance
- Alma mater: University of Utah; Cornell University
- Occupation: Former Dean of the Marriott School of Business at Brigham Young University

Ned Cromar Hill (born 1945) is the American National Advisory Council professor of business management and was dean of the Marriott School of Business (MSB) at Brigham Young University (BYU) from 1998 to 2008. From 2011 to 2014, he served as president of the Romania Bucharest Mission of the Church of Jesus Christ of Latter-day Saints (LDS Church).

== Career ==
Prior to his appointment as the MSB's dean, he served for two years as an assistant to BYU president Merrill J. Bateman, with responsibility for strategic planning in the areas of facilities and space management, distance learning, information systems, and assessment. Before joining the administration, Hill chaired the MSB's Department of Business Management. He joined the MSB faculty as the Joel C. Peterson Professor of Business Administration in 1987 and received the school's Outstanding Faculty Award in 1992.

During 1976 to 1977, Hill was an assistant professor at Cornell University. From 1977 to 1987 he was a finance professor on the faculty of Indiana University. MBA students at both BYU and Indiana University elected him their outstanding teacher several times.

Hill is a widely published author and frequent speaker on the subjects of treasury management, electronic commerce, and personal finance. He was founder and senior editor of EDI FORUM: The Journal of Electronic Commerce and has written four books and more than 70 professional articles. For several years he served on the Information Technology Commission for the state of Utah, and he has been a regional director of the Financial Management Association.

Hill holds a PhD in finance from the Samuel Curtis Johnson Graduate School of Management at Cornell University, a master's degree in chemistry from Cornell, and a bachelor's degree in chemistry from the University of Utah.

On January 25, 2011, the MSB announced the creation of a new chaired professorship, the Ned Cromar Hill Professorship of Finance. The professorship was established and funded by Hill's longtime friends, Brent and Bonnie Jean Beesley.

== Criticism surrounding Mitt Romney's presidential bid ==
On October 9, 2006, Hill and MSB associate dean, W. Steve Albrecht, sent an e-mail to 50 BYU Management Society members and 100 members of the school's National Advisory Council asking them to support Mitt Romney's potential bid for the presidency. Hill and Albrecht signed the message with their official BYU titles, sent the e-mail from a BYU e-mail address, and began the message "Dear Marriott School Friend." Both the LDS Church and BYU, as tax-exempt, nonprofit organizations, are prohibited by federal law from advocating on behalf of a particular candidate or political party. Albrecht said that he should not have sent it in his capacity as a BYU dean: "It wasn't something BYU did, it wasn't something I probably should have done, and it was bad judgment."

== Personal life ==
As a young man, Hill served as an LDS Church missionary in Germany. During his time at Indiana University, Hill served as president of the church's Bloomington Indiana Stake. He and his wife, Claralyn, are the parents of five children. Hill's wife unsuccessfully ran for the Utah State House of Representatives as a moderate Democrat in 2008.
