= Rodney H. Brady =

American businessman (1933–2017)

Rodney Howard Brady (January 31, 1933 – January 9, 2017) was an American corporate businessman. He received a doctoral degree in Business Administration from the Harvard Business School (HBS). Beyond his work in the business world, Brady was the president of Weber State College. He was an assistant secretary in the United States Department of Health, Education, and Welfare (HEW) and was a member of a presidential committee. Brady was a member of the Church of Jesus Christ of Latter-day Saints (LDS Church). He had an enduring involvement in the Scouting movement.

== Personal life ==
On January 31, 1933, Brady was born in Sandy, Utah, the second of four children. While serving in the air force, Brady married a fellow graduate and school teacher and they had three sons.

In his youth, Brady reached the rank of Eagle Scout. He went on to serve in regional and national Scouting leadership roles for over forty years. He received the Silver Beaver, Silver Antelope, and Silver Buffalo awards.

Brady retired in March 2009. He was inducted into the Hall of Fame of Utah Broadcasters, University of Utah College of Science, and University of Utah David Eccles School of Business.

Brady died on January 9, 2017, at the age of 83. He was a diarist. His memoirs, speeches and papers are preserved by the LDS Church and local libraries.

== Education ==
In 1951, Brady graduated as valedictorian from Jordan High School in Sandy. Brady attended the University of Utah, and received a bachelor's degree with honours in Accounting. In 1957, he received a Master of Business Administration (MBA). Brady then completed a doctoral degree in Business Administration at HBS.

From 1978 to 1985, Brady was the president of Weber State College in Ogden, Utah. He has received honorary degrees from the University of Utah, Weber State University, and Snow College.

== LDS Church service ==
Brady was an active member of the LDS Church. He served as a missionary in the British Mission from 1953 to 1955. Brady was also bishop of the Westwood Ward (in Los Angeles, California), and as president of the Los Angeles California Stake.

== Career ==
=== U.S. Air Force ===
Brady served in the U.S. Air Force from 1959-1962, where he received the rank of lieutenant in 1960.

=== Corporate ===
Brady was employed by companies such as Management Systems Corporation in Cambridge, Massachusetts; Hughes Tool Company, an aerospace company in Los Angeles, California from 1966-1970; Bergen Brunswig Corporation, a pharmaceutical company in Los Angeles; Bonneville International, a national broadcasting corporation in Salt Lake City, Utah from 1985-1996; and, was President and Chief Executive Office at Deseret Management Corporation in Salt Lake City from 1996-2009.

=== Government ===
From 1970 to 1972 Brady was the assistant secretary at HEW. He was a member of the President's Sub-Cabinet Executive Officer's Group, in Washington, D.C.

Academic offices
Preceded by Joseph L. Bishop	President of Weber State College; 1978 – 1985	Succeeded by Stephen D. Nadauld
