= Saddleback College =

Community college in Mission Viejo, California, US

- Former name: Saddleback Junior College
- Motto: Welcome to Opportunity.
- Type: Public community college
- Established: 1968; 58 years ago
- Parent institution: SOCCCD
- President: Lonita Cordova
- Students: 25,879
- Location: Mission Viejo, California, United States; 33°33′09″N 117°40′00″W
- Campus: Suburban 200 acres (81 ha)
- Colors: Cardinal and Gold
- Nickname: Bobcats
- Website: www.saddleback.edu

Saddleback College is a public community college in Mission Viejo, California. It is part of the California Community College system and awards over 300 associate degrees, academic certificates, and occupational skills awards in 190 programs. Established in 1968, Saddleback is the oldest and southernmost institution governed by the South Orange County Community College District. Saddleback College is named for the saddle between the twin peaks of Santiago Peak and Modjeska Peak in the Cleveland National Forest. Dr. Lonita Cordova is the 12th president of Saddleback College. Her tenure began on July 1, 2026.

== Academics ==
Saddleback College is the largest member of the South Orange County Community College District. The college awards associate degrees (A.A., A.S) and academic certificates in over 100 areas of study. Not-for-credit Community Education classes are also available through Saddleback College.

Saddleback College provides a Veterans Education Transition Services (VETS) Center. The program is devoted to helping veterans transition from combat to the classroom. VETS supports transitioning combat veterans through an extensive network of care givers in the civilian community, government, and non-profit organizations.

=== Accreditation ===
Saddleback College is accredited by the Accrediting Commission for Community and Junior Colleges. The associate degree nursing program is accredited by the National League for Nursing Accrediting Commission and the paramedic program is accredited by the Commission for Accreditation of Emergency Medical Services Programs.

== Campus and surroundings ==
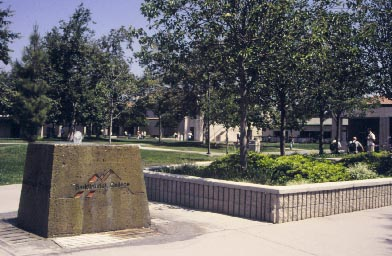
Saddleback College Campus

Saddleback College is located in Mission Viejo, Orange County, California.

A notable site on the campus is the Saddleback College Veterans Memorial, which was officially completed in 2010. A dedication ceremony was held on April 29, 2010, and was attended by representatives for Gov. Arnold Schwarzenegger, lawmakers, active and former members of the armed services, college students and staff. This memorial stands as a symbol of sacrifice, freedom and honor on the Saddleback Campus.

An on-campus bus terminal/transfer point for the Orange County Transportation Authority 85, 91, and MV Shuttle 182 is located on the north end of campus.

== Student life ==
The campus is populated with many student clubs and organizations. The Associated Student Government (ASG) plans, organizes, promotes, sponsors and finances a comprehensive program of activities and services for all Saddleback College students. ASG is made up of three branches which are Inter-Club Council, the Associated Student Senate, Events Cabinet. The Inter-Club Council manages various college clubs that have included the Model United Nations, the Chicano Latino Studies Student Association, College Democrats, College Republicans, Class Action, Students for a Free Tibet, Wilderness Adventure Club, and the Anime Club.

=== Athletics ===
Saddleback College is home to 19 intercollegiate athletic teams.

- Men's teams
  - Baseball
  - Basketball
  - Cross country
  - Football
  - Golf
  - Swimming and diving
  - Tennis
  - Track and field
  - Water polo
- Women's teams
  - Basketball
  - Beach volleyball
  - Cheerleading
  - Cross country
  - Golf
  - Soccer
  - Softball
  - Swimming and diving
  - Tennis
  - Track and field
  - Volleyball
  - Water polo

Saddlebacks teams were known as the "Gauchos" until 2021, when the college changed its athletic fight name to "Bobcats".

== Media ==
- The Lariat: Since opening in 1968, Saddleback College has had a student-run newspaper, the Lariat. It is distributed most Wednesdays of the regular school year. It is printed at the Anaheim, California, facility of the Orange County Register, where 5,000 copies are made. During the fall 2005 semester, the Lariat chose to change its masthead to include Saddleback's sister college in Irvine, Irvine Valley College, to appeal to a broader reader base and increase circulation. The change was met with opposition from members of Saddleback's administration as well as from the Associated Student Government since Irvine Valley College did not contribute funds to the Lariat. Irvine Valley College now gives an allotted sum and the masthead continues to include both colleges. The Lariat was a National Newspaper Pacemaker winner in 1994 and a finalist in 1993, 1997, 2005, and 2006.
- KSBR Saddleback Radio: KSBR is a commercial-free jazz radio station broadcast throughout the LA area on the HD2 secondary channel of 88.5fm. This is done via a partnership with KCSN whose audio appears on 88.5's primary channel. KSBR's format is contemporary jazz but it also has weekend specialty shows featuring other musical styles like reggae, folk, ragtime, rock, Latin jazz, blues, and hip-hop.

In addition to training Saddleback College's Communication Arts students, KSBR has received the Associated Press "Instant News" citation, AP's Certificate of Excellence for overall coverage, and is the only California station to be a four-time winner of the American Heart Association's C. Everett Koop, M.D. award.

- Saddleback College Television: Cox Communications Cable Television - Saddleback College - Channel 39 - Mission Viejo

Saddleback College Cable Television serves cable subscribers with educational and school based programming from all of Saddleback's public and private educational institutions.

== Notable people ==
=== Alumni ===
- Heather C. Allen, research chemist
- Colt Brennan, professional football player
- Mike Bullock, writer
- Anthony Carter, professional basketball player
- Richard Crawford, professional football player
- Deborah Driggs, Playboy Playmate of the Month for March 1990, once married to gymnast Mitch Gaylord
- Barbara Edwards, Playboy Playmate of the Month for September 1983 and Playboy Playmate of the Year for 1984
- Kevin Fagan, creator of Drabble comic strip
- Cade Gaspar, professional baseball player
- Mark Grace, professional baseball player
- Brandon Hammond, actor
- Jackson Hinkle, commentator
- Yolanda Hughes-Heying, professional bodybuilder
- Bill Kenney, professional football player and politician
- Kyle Long, professional football player
- Kevin Magee (1959–2003), professional basketball player
- Ben Maller, sports radio personality and Internet sports columnist
- Stephone Paige, professional football player
- Chris Parker, professional football player
- Kasey Peters, professional football player
- Mike Piel, professional football player
- Nick Punto, professional baseball player
- Chris Sulages, professional football coach
- T. J. Shorts, professional basketball player
- Bob Thornton, professional basketball player and coach
- Ashley Wagner (born 1991), figure skater
- Menelik Watson, professional football player
- Tim Wallach, professional baseball player
- Victor Webster, Canadian actor
- Gregory Widen, screenwriter and director

=== Faculty ===
- Jonelle Allen, actress, singer, dancer, and film director
- Amy Sterling Casil (born 1962), science fiction writer
- John Cederquist (born 1946), sculptor
- Simon Arkell (born 1966), Olympic pole vaulter, entrepreneur
- Helen Feyler-Switz (1925–2006), artist, sculptor
- Maria Mayenzet, actress, film producer, and film director
