= Frankensteins of Fraud =

- Author: Joseph T. Wells
- Language: English
- Publisher: Obsidian Publishing
- Publication date: 2000
- Media type: Print
- Pages: 386
- ISBN: 1-889277-25-8

Frankensteins of Fraud is a book written by Joseph T. Wells, founder of the Association of Certified Fraud Examiners. Subtitled The 20th Century's Top Ten White-Collar Criminals, the book profiles ten famous criminal frauds. From Charles Ponzi, the father of the Ponzi scheme, to Crazy Eddie, this books talks about the crimes committed by these fraudsters and the consequences of those crimes. After publishing the book, Wells donated the materials that he'd collected during his research to establish the Fraud Museum in Austin, Texas.

== Synopsis ==
Frankensteins of Fraud covers the following criminals and their activities:

- Charles Ponzi, father of the Ponzi scheme who arrived in America with as little as $2.50 in his pocket and soon grew to earn millions by conning thousands of working people.
- Cassie Chadwick, who claimed to be the daughter of Andrew Carnegie who was supposed to inherit $400 million had her opportunities created for her by tons of banks agreeing to loan her big money for interest rates going off the roofs.
- Ivar Kreuger made billions until he was destroyed by the stock market crash of 1929.
- Phillip Musica, aka F. Donald Coster, M.D., Ph.D also the CEO of McKesson and Robbins Pharmaceuticals swindled millions of dollars from his own company.
- Robert Vesco, whose handling of mutual funds led to the SEC making him a fugitive and sending him on a 30 year crime spree until he was caught.
- Stanley Goldblum, most famous for his 2 billion dollar Equity Funding Insurance Scam.
- John Bennett who used charitable organizations to come up with his very own Ponzi scheme along with "Crazy Eddie", Mark Whitacre and Michael Milken.
