= Kevin D. Stocks =

Kevin D. Stocks is an accounting professor in the Marriott School of Management at Brigham Young University. He currently holds the KPMG Professorship and recently stepped down as the director of the School of Accountancy, a position he held for the last nine years. This year he is involved as professor in residence with KPMG.

Stocks did his undergraduate and master's work at BYU. He earned his PhD at Oklahoma State University. He was on the accounting faculty at Oklahoma State before returning to BYU in 1983. Stocks teaches in the cost/managerial accounting area. He has taught classes at all levels and in both the accounting and MBA programs.

He has published in Issues In Accounting Education, Journal of Accounting Education, Advances in Accounting Education, Journal of Accountancy, Internal Auditor, Health Care Financial Management, and Journal of Information Systems and has been an author on two books. Stocks has conducted funded research for the AICPA, AAA, IMA and is currently involved in an IAAER/ACCA research grant studying international ethics education.

Stocks has held numerous administrative positions within BYU and in professional organizations. He has served as president of the Federation of Schools of Accountancy and as president of the Teaching and Curriculum Section and of the Accounting Programs Leadership Group of the American Accounting Association (AAA). He served as vice-president education of the AAA and on numerous AICPA committees, including the Pre-Certification Education Executive Committee and the Management Advisory Services Committee. He recently completed a three-year assignment as the president-elect, president and past president of the American Accounting Association.

== Sources ==
- Beta Alpha Psi Biography
