= Chris Sulages =

American football player and coach (born 1973)

Biographical details
- Born: January 25, 1973 (age 53); Mission Viejo, California, U.S.

Playing career
- 1992–1993: Saddleback
- 1994–1995: Weber State
- Position: Offensive lineman

Coaching career (HC unless noted)
- 1995: Weber State (assistant)
- 1996: San Diego assistant)
- 1997–1999: Occidental (assistant)
- 2000-2001: Prague Panthers
- 2001–2002: Cal State Northridge (OL/TE)
- 2003–2004: Lewis & Clark (OL)
- 2005: Lewis & Clark (OC)
- 2006–2015: Lewis & Clark

Head coaching record
- Overall: 19–62 (college)

Accomplishments and honors

Awards
- D3football.com West Region Coach of the Year (2011)

Chris Sulages (born January 25, 1973) is an American football coach and former player. He was the head football coach at Lewis & Clark College from 2006 until 2015. Sulages revived the Pioneers football program from consecutive winless seasons in 2006 and 2007 to a 7–2 record and second place in the Northwest Conference in 2011, which earned him the distinction of D3football.com's West Region Coach of the Year.

== Coaching career ==
From 2001 to 2002, Sulages coached offensive line and tight ends at Division I-AA Cal State Northridge. In 2001, the Matadors sported the #2 total offense in the nation. Sulages was a CSU-N recruiting coordinator, fitness instructor, and NCAA eligibility liaison.

Sulages is a former head coach for the Prague Panthers in the Czech Republic. While coaching in Prague, his teams were the #1 rushing offense, #1 total offense and total defense in the Czech League. The Panthers made two Euro Bowl playoff appearances and earned one national title.

Sulages' NCAA Division III experience includes a three-year stint as an assistant offensive coach at Occidental College where he coordinated the Tiger run game and pass protection schemes for the #1 rushing offense in the Southern California Intercollegiate Athletic Conference. He has also worked with the offensive line, tight ends, and special teams at the University of San Diego and Weber State University.

A graduate of Weber State, Sulages played two seasons on the Wildcats offensive line where he received All-Big Sky Conference honors. He earned a degree in English with a minor in physical education and coaching. He played two years of junior college football at Saddleback College, where he was all-conference and helped lead the Gauchos to a junior college national championship in 1992. He earned a degree in liberal studies at Saddleback.

== Head coaching record ==
=== College ===
Year	Team	Overall	Conference	Standing	Bowl/playoffs	D3football.com^{#}
Lewis & Clark Pioneers (Northwest Conference) (2006–2014)
2006	Lewis & Clark	0–9	0–6	7th		
2007	Lewis & Clark	0–9	0–6	7th		
2008	Lewis & Clark	1–8	0–6	7th		
2009	Lewis & Clark	2–7	1–5	6th		
2010	Lewis & Clark	4–5	2–4	5th		
2011	Lewis & Clark	7–2	4–2	2nd		10 (West Region)
2012	Lewis & Clark	4–5	1–5	6th		
2013	Lewis & Clark	1–8	1–5	6th		
2014	Lewis & Clark	0–9	0–7	7th		
Lewis & Clark:		19–62	9–48			
Total:		19–62				
