= K. Fred Skousen =

American educator and administrator

- Education: DBA (1969)
- Alma mater: BYU, University of Illinois
- Occupations: Educator, administrator
- Spouse: Julie
- Children: 6

K. Fred Skousen is an American educator and administrator. Skousen retired in 2008 as the Advancement Vice President at Brigham Young University. Previously, he was Dean of the Marriott School of Management and Director of the School of Accountancy at Brigham Young University. Skousen has been a consultant to the Financial Executive Research Foundation, the Comptroller General of the United States, the Federal Trade Commission and several large companies. Skousen served as a faculty member at the University of Minnesota, the University of California, Berkeley, and the University of Missouri, as well as a faculty resident on the staff of the U.S. Securities and Exchange Commission (SEC). He served as Director of Research and a member of the executive committee of the American Accounting Association, is a former member of the American Institute of CPAs and is a former president of the Utah Association of CPAs.

Skousen earned a B.A. from Brigham Young University and an M.A. and Ph.D. from the University of Illinois.
