= Joseph Bishop =

College administrator

Joseph L. Bishop
- Born: Joseph Layton Bishop Jr. August 23, 1932 (age 94); Delta, Utah
- Education: Brigham Young University; Claremont Graduate School (PhD, 1958)
- Occupation: University administrator
- Years active: 1960–
- Spouse: Carolyn Callister Bishop (1934–2004, m. 1956)

President of Weber State College
- In office 1972–1978

Joseph Layton Bishop Jr. (born 1932) is a retired administrator of colleges and other post-secondary educational institutions and a Latter-day Saint devotional and motivational author. His books include The Making of a Missionary and Peace be Unto Thy Soul.

== Early life and education ==
Bishop was born August 23, 1932, in Delta, Utah. He graduated from Delta High School in 1950 and served as a missionary for the Church of Jesus Christ of Latter-day Saints (LDS Church) in Argentina. Bishop and Carolyn Callister married on June 28, 1956 and are the parents of five sons. Bishop earned a B.A. in Spanish in 1955 and an M.A. in Spanish in 1958, both from Brigham Young University (BYU). In 1958, Bishop earned a Ph.D. in university administration from Claremont Graduate School. In 1980 or 1981, Bishop was awarded an honorary doctorate of humanities from Weber State College (WSC), upon his retirement there.

== Career ==
From 1960 to 1961, Bishop was chairman of the Spanish department at Imperial Valley College. In 1961, he became president of the Haitian-American Institute, before becoming academic dean at Mt. San Jacinto College (1962–1966). Bishop later moved on to Prairie State College, where he served as vice president (1966–1968). From 1968–1972, Bishop was executive director of GT-70, an educational consortia made up of thirty U.S. colleges. In May 1972, Bishop was appointed president of WSC in Utah.

Under Bishop's leadership, the Dee Events Center was inaugurated. Some on the WSC staff felt he was condescending in his attitude towards staff.

The LDS Church assigned Bishop to serve as president of the Argentina Buenos Aires North Mission from 1978 to 1981. Bishop later served as president of the LDS Church's main site for training its missionaries, the Missionary Training Center (MTC) in Provo, Utah, from 1983 to 1986. After 1986, Bishop was executive director of the BYU–Public School Partnership, where he coordinated the interface between five school districts and BYU's college of education. After his retirement, Bishop and his wife, Carolyn, served as the LDS Church's area welfare agents for Central America, headquartered in Guatemala, 1994–1996.

== Works authored ==
Bishop has written articles for various academic publications while an educator. He also has authored "The Making of a Missionary" (1982) and other works for a Mormon audience.

== Defendant in lawsuit alleging sexual abuse ==
McKenna Denson, a woman alleged to have been sexually assaulted by Bishop in 1984, recorded an interview with him at a hotel conference room in Chandler, Arizona in December 2017, which was leaked to the public in March 2018. In the recording, Denson questions Bishop about their interactions in 1984 while he served as the president of the Provo MTC. In the recording, Bishop describes himself as a predator, a hypocrite, and a sex addict. After Denson spoke with BYU police in January 2018, the police interviewed Bishop. According to the BYU police department report, Bishop said he did not assault Denson; he asked Denson to show him her breasts during an encounter with her in his private preparation room, which she did. Local county prosecutor's office said it likely would have filed charges against Bishop based on Denson's allegations, however, the statute of limitations for rape in Utah in the 1980s was four years. In April 2018, Denson filed suit against Bishop and the LDS Church in federal court in Salt Lake City for redress concerning her mental, physical, and economic hardships as caused by the alleged sexual assault and battery, negligent and intentional infliction of emotional distress, fraud, fraudulent nondisclosure, and fraudulent concealment. On 10 December 2020, a federal judge terminated the case with prejudice.

Academic offices
| Preceded by William P. Miller | President of Weber State College; 1972–1978 | Succeeded by Rodney H. Brady |
