= William G. Dyer =

American economist

- Born: October 4, 1925; Portland, Oregon, United States
- Died: 1997 (aged 71–72); Provo, Utah, United States
- Education: Brigham Young University (B.A., M.A.); University of Wisconsin (Ph.D.)
- Occupation: Former Dean of the Marriott School of Management at Brigham Young University
- Spouse: Bonnie
- Parent(s): George William Dyer and Ada Gibb

William Gibb Dyer (aka Bill Dyer) was an American educator who served as the fourth Dean of the Marriott School of Management at Brigham Young University (BYU). He received a B.A. from BYU in 1950, followed by a M.A. from the same institution two years later. In 1955 he earned a Ph.D. in Social psychology from the University of Wisconsin.

Dyer's academic and professional careers focused on the topics of organizational change and team dynamics. While a professor, Dyer concurrently worked as a consultant. Dyer co-founded Dyer & Associates with sons W. Gibb Dyer Jr. and Jeff H. Dyer (who are also BYU professors). As part of this venture, Dyer consulted for companies including Exxon, General Foods, AT&T, and Honeywell. Bill was also a founding partner of Business for Social Responsibility, Inc. Author of Team Building, Dyer also co-developed of the world's first 360-degree feedback instrument to evaluate managerial style and effectiveness. Bill taught at BYU in the Marriott School of Management for 30 years and helped organize the school's Department of Organizational Behavior, serving as its first chair. He served as Dean of the Marriott School from 1979 to 1984, during which time the school's Tanner Building was constructed.

Dyer had five children (Gibb, Mike, Lisa, Jeff, and David) and was an active member of the Church of Jesus Christ of Latter-day Saints—having served as a stake president, bishop, and full-time missionary. In Fall 2003, BYU memorialized Dyer by creating the William G. Dyer Institute for Leading Organizational Change within the Marriott School of Management.
