= Weldon J. Taylor =

American University dean

Weldon Johnson Taylor
- Born: 1908
- Died: August 21, 2000; Provo, Utah, United States
- Education: B.S. (1934); M.S. (1937); Ph.D. (1952) Marketing
- Alma mater: Brigham Young University; Harvard University; New York University
- Occupation: Former Dean of the Marriott School of Management at Brigham Young University

Weldon Johnson Taylor was an American educator who served as the first Dean of the Marriott School of Management at Brigham Young University (BYU). He received a B.S. from BYU in 1934, a M.S. from Harvard University in 1937, and a Ph.D. in Marketing from New York University in 1952.

Taylor served as a statistician for the Federal Power Commission in Washington, D.C. Taylor took a year’s sabbatical leave in 1963 to join the Ford Foundation to work with the National Institute of Management Development in Cairo, Egypt. He also co-authored the widely used textbook Marketing: An Analytical Approach (1981). Taylor served as the first dean of the Marriott School of Management from 1957 to 1974, helping to create the school's Department of Organizational behavior while there.

== Works ==
- Taylor, Weldon J. (1991). Pragmatics of values: History of the first twenty years of the National Advisory Council in partnership with the J. Willard and Alice S. Marriott School of Management : 1966-1985. Brigham Young University. ISBN 0-8425-2302-2.
