= Marriott School of Business =

Business school of Brigham Young University

- Type: Private business school
- Established: 1891
- Parent institution: Brigham Young University
- Religious affiliation: The Church of Jesus Christ of Latter-day Saints
- Endowment: $404.7 million
- Dean: Brigitte C. Madrian
- Faculty: 137 full-time
- Undergraduates: 2,100
- Postgraduates: 1,200
- Location: Provo, Utah, United States; 40°15′2″N 111°39′8″W
- Website: marriottschool.byu.edu

The Marriott School of Business is the business school of Brigham Young University (BYU), a private university owned by the Church of Jesus Christ of Latter-day Saints (LDS Church) and located in Provo, Utah, United States. It was founded in 1891 and renamed in 1988 after J. Willard Marriott, founder of Marriott International, and his wife Alice following their $15 million endowment gift to the school.

The school is housed in the N. Eldon Tanner Building and supports 137 full-time faculty and approximately 200 adjunct, part-time or visiting faculty, full-time staff and students who teach. It has approximately 2,100 undergraduate and 1,200 graduate students, and approximately 62 percent of its student body are bilingual. As of 2019, its alumni base numbers 55,000.

== Description ==
Going by several different names since its inception in 1891, the business school at BYU had been known as the Marriott School of Management since 1988, when Marriott International founders J. Willard and Alice Marriott made a $15 million (equivalent to $40.83 million in 2025) donation to the school. In 2017, the name was changed to the Marriott School of Business. The Marriott School is housed in the N. Eldon Tanner Building and offers five undergraduate and six graduate degrees.

Ethical decision-making is strongly emphasized at the school: undergraduate students are required to complete 14 hours of religion coursework for graduation, all Marriott School students must take at least one course in management ethics, and both students and faculty must commit to abide by the university's honor code. The school also exhibits a unique culture because the majority of its student and faculty are members of the LDS Church.

Many Marriott School students obtain a level of foreign language proficiency while serving as LDS Church missionaries. (Sixty-five percent of the student body is bilingual.) Consequently, the Marriott School sponsors high-proficiency business language courses in 11 languages. The school claims over 55,000 alumni and is accredited by the Association to Advance Collegiate Schools of Business.

== History ==
In 1891, Brigham Young Academy, the predecessor to BYU, formed the Commercial College, which offered coursework in business education. A decade later, the college began offering its first four-year degree program. After Brigham Young Academy was separated into Brigham Young High School and Brigham Young University in 1903, the college was renamed the College of Commerce and Business Administration as part of the university. The next decade was tough for the college, as "BYU struggled through the World War I, a flu epidemic [that] closed the school during the fall term of 1918, and school indebtedness that resulted in the 1918 LDS purchase of both BYU's assets and debts." Starting in 1921, the college was housed in the Maeser Building, where it would remain for 13 years.

The Wall Street Crash of 1929 significantly depleted LDS Church funds, which caused the church to consider closing BYU. However, "the transference of a number of church junior colleges allowed BYU to remain in operation." By 1935, the church regained its financial footing and provided more aid to BYU, and the school grew slowly over the next ten years. The business college subsequently began offering master's degrees in 1939; however, the programs were hit hard beginning in 1941 when its enrollment (particularly that of men) dropped due to U.S. involvement in World War II. But later that decade, U.S. military veterans returned to school, and in 1945 enrollment doubled. William F. Edwards oversaw the college's growth over the next several years until 1957, when the school was re-branded as the College of Business and Weldon J. Taylor was appointed as its first dean. A year later the business school held its first management conference, and in 1960 the school was moved to the newly completed Jesse Knight Building.

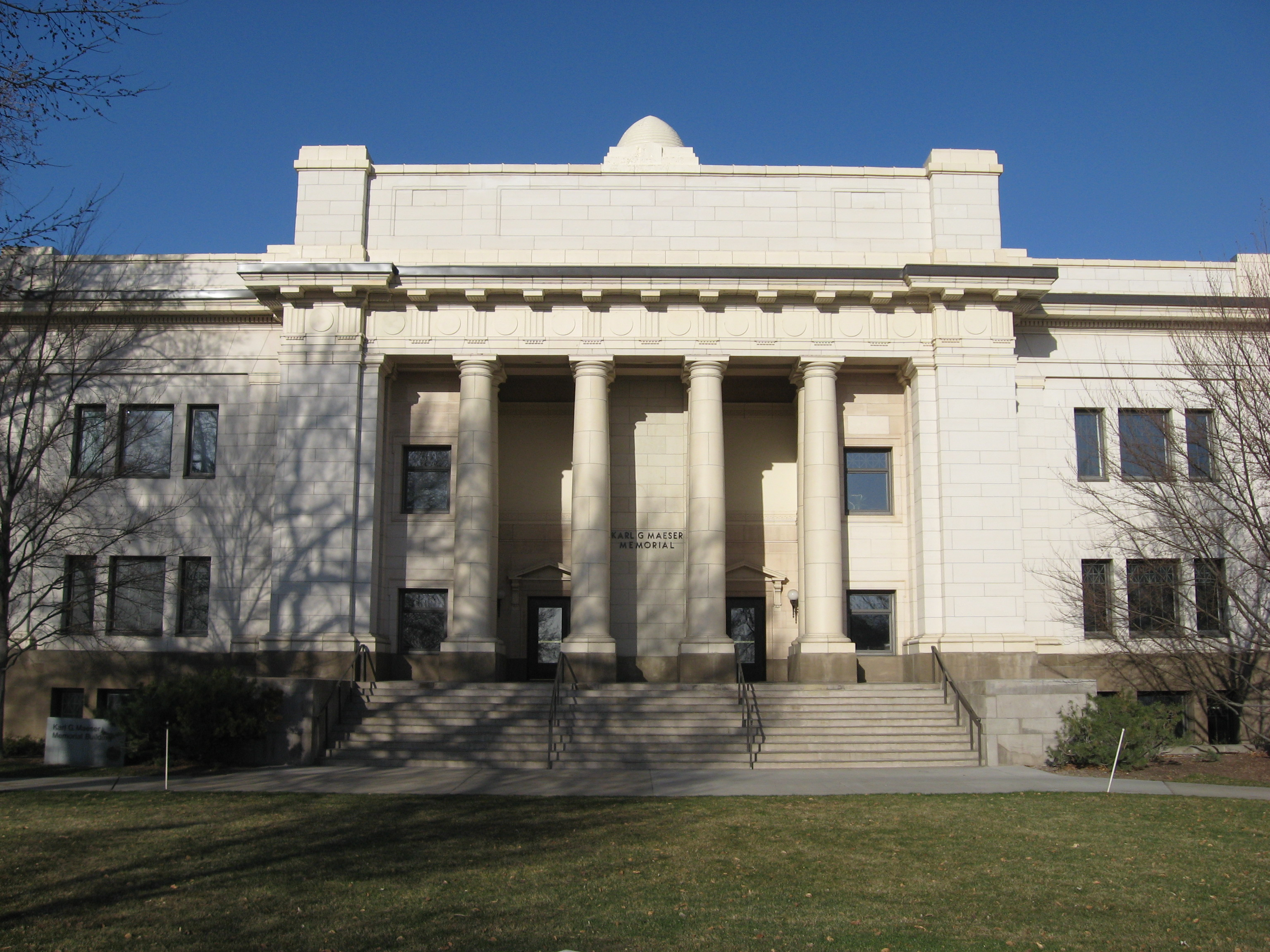
The Maeser Building housed the business school from 1921 to 1960.

A Master of Business Administration (MBA) program was added in 1961, and the school formed its National Advisory Council in 1966. In 1973, the school bestowed its first International Executive of the Year Award on AT&T president Robert D. Lilley. Bruce B. Orton served as interim dean of the school for a year until 1975, when Merrill J. Bateman was recruited from a management position at candy-maker Mars, Inc. to become the dean. That same year, the school was separated into the School of Management for undergraduate studies and the Graduate School of Management, which grouped together the MBA, MPA, MOB, and MAcc programs. A year later, the business school created a School of Accountancy within its jurisdiction and printed its first issue of Exchange magazine (now Marriott Alumni Magazine). In 1977, the BYU Management Society was organized.

In 1979, William G. Dyer became dean of the school. Dyer oversaw the construction of the N. Eldon Tanner Building, which was dedicated in 1982. In 1983, an Executive MBA program was added, and in 1984 Paul H. Thompson was appointed dean of the school. Two years later, the International Student Sponsor Program was started, which continues to provide financial assistance to married Latter-day Saint international students to this day. In 1988, the name of the school was changed to Marriott School of Management in honor of its benefactors—Marriott International founders J. Willard and Alice Marriott—following their $15 million donation to the school. That same year, the Army and Air Force ROTC programs became a part of the Marriott School.

In 1989, K. Fred Skousen became dean of the school. In that year, the school's endowment exceeded $10 million, and the school was awarded a Center for International Business Education and Research (CIBER) grant by the U.S. Department of Education. In 1993, the Organizational Leadership and Strategy Department was created, and a year later the school instituted a limited-enrollment policy. Also in 1994, the school began offering a minor in management. By 1998, the school's endowment had reached $40 million and the Institute of Public Management was renamed in honor of George W. Romney, who during his lifetime served as chairman of American Motors Corporation, Governor of Michigan, and U.S. Secretary of Housing and Urban Development. That same year, Ned C. Hill was named dean of the Marriott School.

The Melvin J. Ballard Center for Social Impact was formed in 2003, and the Information Systems Department was created in 2005. That same year the CESR also participated in the production of the microcredit documentary Small Fortunes, which aired nationwide on October 27, 2005, on PBS. In 2006, the school's worldwide initiatives were organized under the Kay and Yvonne Whitmore Global Management Center, named for former Kodak CEO Kay Whitmore and his wife.

In 2006, members of the school's faculty were involved in controversy surrounding the U.S. Republican Party presidential primaries. On October 9, Dean Hill and Associate Dean W. Steve Albrecht sent an e-mail to 50 BYU Management Society members and 100 members of the school's National Advisory Council asking them to support Mitt Romney's bid for the U.S. presidency. Hill and Albrecht signed the message with their official BYU titles, sent the e-mail from a BYU e-mail address, and began the message "Dear Marriott School Friend." Both the LDS Church and BYU, as tax-exempt, nonprofit organizations, are prohibited by federal law from endorsing a particular candidate or political party. Albrecht said that he should not have sent it in his capacity as a BYU dean: "It wasn't something BYU did, it wasn't something I probably should have done, and it was bad judgment."

By 2007, the school's endowment reached $130 million, and in 2008, the Tanner Building Addition was dedicated. In 2013, the endowment reached $182.1 million. Also during this year, the Finance Department was formed in an effort to strengthen curriculum and placement; the Center for Entrepreneurship and Technology was created in honor of former Dell CEO Kevin Rollins and his wife, Debra; and administrators announced the addition of a Recreation Management and Youth Leadership (RMYL) Department to the school. The latter department was formerly under BYU's College of Health and Human Performance and comprises the academic disciplines of leisure services management, therapeutic recreation, Scouting administration, non-profit management, and youth leadership. In 2017, the Recreation Management program was converted to the Experience Design & Management program, and the Therapeutic Recreation emphasis was retired.

In August 2017, BYU announced the name would be changed from the Marriott School of Management to the Marriott School of Business.

In May 2018, Brigitte C. Madrian, a behavioral economist from the faculty at the Harvard Kennedy School, was named the ninth dean of the Marriott School of Business and is the first female to serve as dean.

== Campus ==
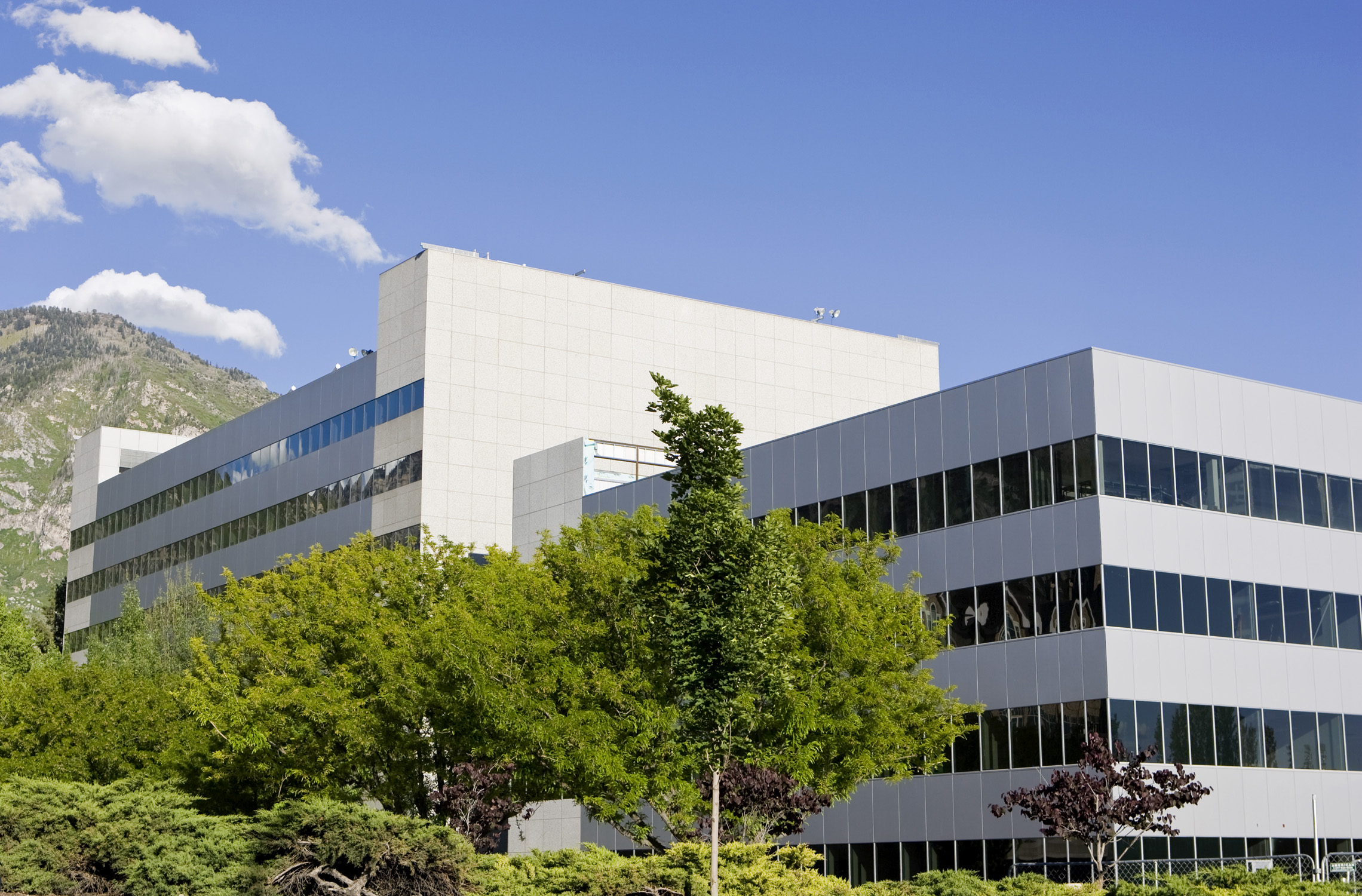
The N. Eldon Tanner Building was expanded 53 percent in 2008 to accommodate the Marriott School's growth.

The Marriott School is located on the campus of BYU, which is situated in the urban, Wasatch Front area of Provo, Utah. The school is principally housed inside the N. Eldon Tanner Building. At the building's construction announcement in 1980, BYU president Dallin H. Oaks said that the Board of Trustees named it in honor of N. Eldon Tanner (a Canadian politician and counselor to four LDS Church presidents) because he was known in Canada as "Mr. Integrity"—a title wished upon every Marriott School graduate. At the groundbreaking for the building on November 8, 1980, "explosives that were used to remove the soil showered unsuspecting spectators with dust and pebbles." The Tanner Building was completed in late 1982 and dedicated on April 5, 1983, by Gordon B. Hinckley. Today, the seven-story, 120,000 square feet (11,000 m^{2}) granite building houses Marriott School classrooms as well as professor and administration offices. A 76,000 square feet (7,100 m^{2}) addition, costing $43 million and funded by donations, was dedicated on October 24, 2008, by alumnus Thomas S. Monson. The addition increased the building's capacity by 53 percent and provides 10 tiered classrooms, one network teaching room, one large assembly room, and 39 study rooms.

The Tanner Building is located directly west of central campus. To its immediate north is the Gordon B. Hinckley Alumni and Visitors Center and on-campus housing Helaman Halls. Its western and southern sides are covered by athletic facilities. Close by is also the newly renovated Jesse Knight Building, where some business school classes are held. Additionally, a parking garage is located adjacent to the Tanner Building.

== Academics ==
=== Organization and research ===
Marriott School subsidiaries
(Department/school)

Accountancy, School of
Aerospace Studies (Air Force ROTC)
Business Management
Finance
Global Supply Chain
Information Systems
Marketing
Military Science (Army ROTC)
Organizational Leadership and Strategy
Romney Institute of Public Service and Ethics
Experience Design and Management

As part of the larger institution of BYU, the Marriott School is ultimately administered by BYU's president and board of trustees. Under them, the school is directly managed by a dean (currently Brigitte C. Madrian), who is advised by three associate deans and the school's advisory council. The school has nine academic departments, each overseen by a department chair. The Marriott School student body has its own student council, which serves an umbrella organization for Marriott School clubs. The school houses student chapters for national associations including the Society for Human Resource Management, the Collegiate Entrepreneurs' Organization, Rotaract, and Net Impact. There is also a chapter of the honorary association Beta Alpha Psi.

Faculty are grouped in one or more of seven "academic areas": accounting, business management (including management communication, business law, and international business), finance, information systems, organizational leadership and strategy, public management, and experience design and management. The school is also home to four research centers that organize research in different fields of business administration and establish liaisons between the Marriott School and the corporate world. Both undergraduate and graduate students may be invited to work as teaching and research assistants, and some MAcc students teach accounting classes during the spring or summer terms, as well as at the BYU's Salt Lake Center. However, research productivity is hampered by the fact that the Marriott School has no doctoral programs, and therefore, no doctoral students focused on research. The Marriott School faculty was ranked #64 nationally and #71 globally in 2008 for its research productivity in the UTD Top 100 Business School Research Ranking.

The Marriott School oversees two perennial publications: Economic Self-Reliance (a semi-annual, practitioner-focused publication that highlights research and best practices) and Marriott Alumni Magazine (a tri-annual publication that showcases innovative business research and ideas as well as news from the school and alumni). Marriott School students and faculty are serviced by the Business and Economics Library within the Harold B. Lee Library, which houses an accounting lab and computer facilities in the financial field. The MSM is accredited by the Association to Advance Collegiate Schools of Business.

=== Curriculum and degrees offered ===
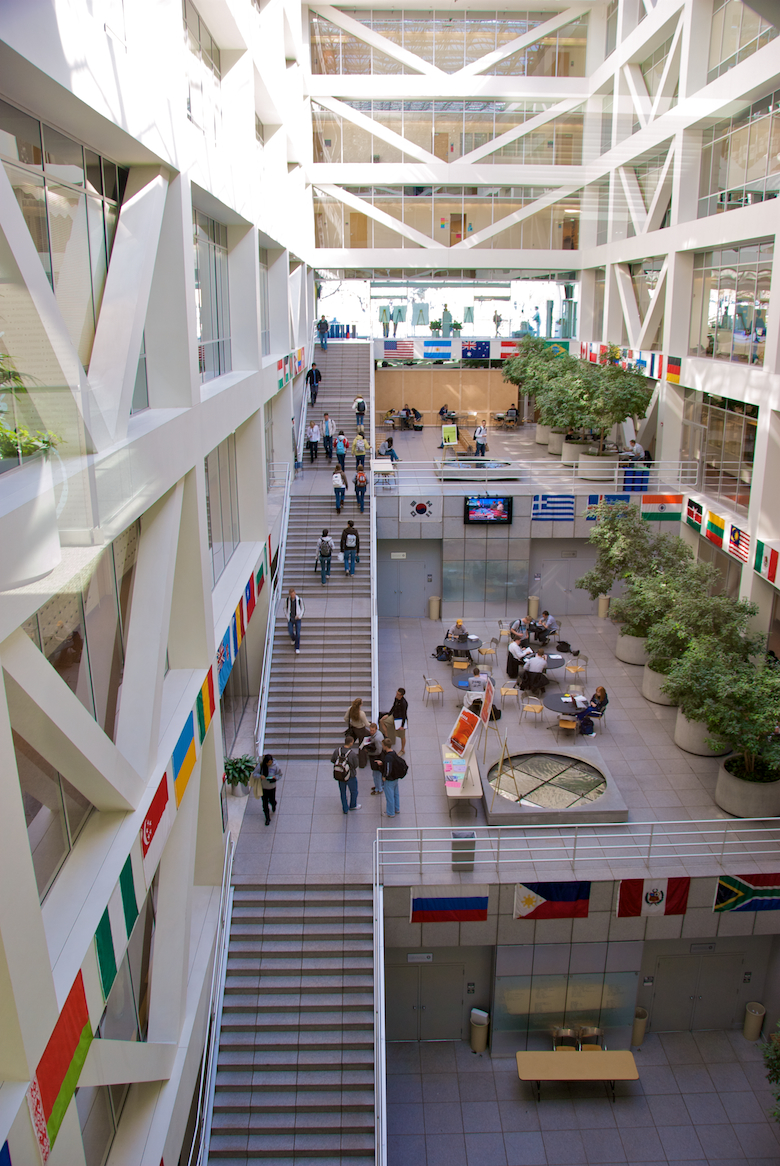
The atrium of the Tanner Building's east wing

The Marriott School offers ten Bachelor of Science degree programs: Accounting, Finance, Information Systems, Global Supply Chain Management, Marketing, Human Resource Management, Strategic Management, Entrepreneurial Management, Experience Design and Management, and Business Management. Seven minors are also offered: Business, Entrepreneurship, Global Business and Literacy, Healthcare Leadership, Information Systems, Global and Community Impact, and Strategy.

The school offers six graduate degrees: the MAcc, MBA, EMBA, EMPA, MISM, and MPA. MBA students choose a major (Finance, Marketing, Supply Chain Management, OBHR, or Product Development) and a minor (Entrepreneurship, International Business, Strategy) if desired. MAcc students choose either audit, tax, or PhD Prep.

Matriculation into the Marriott School as an undergraduate requires an application independent from normal acceptance to BYU. Once in the program, students go through a one-semester "core" where students in the block are in the same classes together as teams. All undergraduates must also complete a one-semester mentoring program where each student selects a Marriott School alumnus to converse with over the course of the semester. The Marriott School's class schedules mirror those of the university: two 16-week semesters (fall and winter) and two terms over the summer break (spring and summer). Students must carry 12 credit hours in order to be considered a full-time student, and 18 credit hours is the maximum unless permission is granted to take more.

About 70% of student tuition is funded by LDS Church tithing funds, making tuition less expensive for church members than at similar private universities. Students not members of the church pay double the church member tuition rate. For the 2014–2015 school year, Marriott School tuition for full-time LDS undergraduates is $2,500 per semester; for Marriott School graduate students, it is $5,810 per semester. All Marriott School students may apply for several school-specific and university-wide financial aid opportunities. Some are program-specific, others are need-based. The Hawes Scholars program is the highest scholarship distinction given to MBA students at the school. The program awards $10,000 to second-year students who are nominated by students or faculty, and who are then selected based on academic performance, leadership maturity, and a commitment to high ethical standards.

All Marriott School students may also earn the Global Management Certificate. To earn the certificate, students are required to take a business language course, pertinent international business classes, and participate in an international field study or study abroad program. Undergraduate students may also qualify for graduation honors. University Honors is the highest distinction BYU awards its graduates. Overseen by Honors Program, the distinction requires students to complete an honors curriculum requirement, a Great Works requirement, an Advanced Languages requirement, a service requirement, an honors thesis requirement, a graduation portfolio that summarizes the student's honors experiences—all while maintaining at least a 3.5 GPA. The Marriott School designates a faculty member as its honors coordinator, who aids students in finding faculty with whom to begin honors thesis research. The university also awards Latin scholastic distinctions: summa cum laude, top 1 percent; magna cum laude, top 5 percent; and cum laude, top 10 percent.

=== Rankings, awards, and admissions ===
Many of the Marriott School's degree programs have received high rankings from independent sources. In 2014, the Marriott School's undergraduate programs were ranked #13 by BusinessWeek. The Marriott School's MBA program received rankings from several sources for 2016–2017: #23 ranking by BusinessWeek, #17 by Forbes, and #27 by U.S. News & World Report. Among regional schools the program was ranked #1 by The Wall Street Journal's most recent ranking (2007); and among business schools worldwide the MBA program was ranked #93 for 2014 by Financial Times. The undergrad program was also ranked #2 for return on investment (BusinessWeek, 2013) and #2 for its emphasis on ethics (The Wall Street Journal, 2007).

Business school rankings

United States
- Bloomberg MBA: 35
- USNWR MBA: 27

Global
- Financial Times MBA: 92

The Marriott School's accounting program is the only program in the country to receive the American Accounting Association's Innovation in Accounting Education Award twice. The first award, received in 1993, was for the development of an integrated approach to teaching accounting. The second award, received in 2007, was for the development of a PhD Prep Track to prepare MAcc students to enroll in a PhD program after graduation. For 2013, the bachelor's degree in the School of Accountancy received two #3 rankings, one by Public Accounting Report and the other by U.S. News & World Report. The same two reporting agencies also ranked the school's MAcc program #2 and #7 in the nation, respectively.

The Information Systems department was ranked #26 in the nation in 2003 for research, and its MISM program was ranked "among the top ten" by TechRepublic in 2008.

The Marriott School is one of the few colleges at BYU that requires application from undergraduate students post-matriculation to the university itself. In addition to essays and pre-baccalaureate academics, students are evaluated on performance in 13 credit hours of "pre-management" coursework at BYU. For 2008, the MSM admitted 69 percent of undergraduate applicants, comprising a class of 1,783 students.

Applicants to the MBA program are evaluated based on commitment to the mission of BYU and the LDS Church, undergraduate academic performance, Graduate Management Admission Test (GMAT) standardized test scores, essays, work experience, recommendations, written applications, and interviews, if applicable. For 2009, the MBA program admitted 51 percent of applicants or 478 students. The class averaged 672 on the GMAT, 3.54 GPA, and 45 months of work experience post-baccalaureate.

== People ==
=== Students ===
The Marriott School student body comprises approximately 1,900 undergraduate and 1,100 graduate students. Nearly 75 percent of the students are bilingual and about 30 percent speak a third language, most having lived abroad while serving a mission for the LDS Church. Approximately 16 percent of students are international students, 66 percent are married, and whites (non-Hispanic) comprise 91 percent of the student body as of 2009. Eighty-seven percent of domestic students hail from the West. The mean and median ages of undergraduate students is 23, 21 percent of whom are female. Female MBA students only account for 13 percent of the graduating class.

The Marriott School embodies a distinct culture due to its affiliation with the LDS Church. "Membership in The Church of Jesus Christ of Latter-day Saints is not required for admittance into the [school], but an understanding of and a commitment to support the Church's mission is necessary." All students must adhere to the university's honor code, which prescribes standards of morality, dress and grooming, academic honesty, and drug and alcohol non-consumption. Undergraduate students must also take 14 credit hours of religion courses in order to fulfill the university's religious education requirement for graduation.

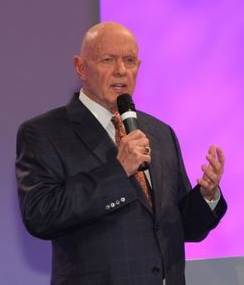
Author and professional speaker Stephen R. Covey, former Marriott School professor

Students find diversion in clubs sponsored by the MSM and in university-wide intramural sports. Students interested in careers in academia can participate in the Marriott School of Management Pre-doctoral Student Organization. Students also compete in academic competitions at various campuses and venues. A BYU student team placed #1 at the University of Arizona's annual ethics competition (Duel in the Desert) in 2006 and 2007, and a team of undergraduate accounting students placed #1 in the 2007 Deloitte Tax Case Competition—marking BYU's seventh consecutive first- or second-place finish in this division. The BYU chapter of the Collegiate Entrepreneurs Organization also received three first-place national chapter awards at the organization's national conference in Chicago, including "Best in Teaching Entrepreneurship" and "Best Chapter Marketing." Additionally, a BYU student team was #3 at the 2007 International Venture Capital Investment Competition finals, finishing behind MIT and the University of Virginia.

=== Faculty ===
The Marriott School has 130 full-time faculty with more than 90 percent holding PhDs. Faculty have included former Academy of Management president David Whetten, WordPerfect co-founder Alan Ashton, FranklinCovey co-founder Stephen Covey, University of Oxford professor Teppo Felin, and Steve Albrecht, former President of the Association of Certified Fraud Examiners and of the American Accounting Association.

Several Marriott School faculty have been awarded for their efforts in teaching and research, as well as in the community. Kevin Stocks was awarded the 2007 Joseph A. Silvoso Faculty Award of Merit by the Federation of Schools of Accountancy for displaying excellence in accounting education, and Warner Woodworth received the 2007 Faculty Pioneer Award in External Impact from The Aspen Institute's Center for Business Education in recognition for the integration of social issues in research and teaching. Gary Cornia also received the 2006 Stephen D. Gold Award from the Association for Public Policy Analysis and Management, while Chyleen Arbon was appointed to the Utah Advisory Committee to the U.S. Commission on Civil Rights.

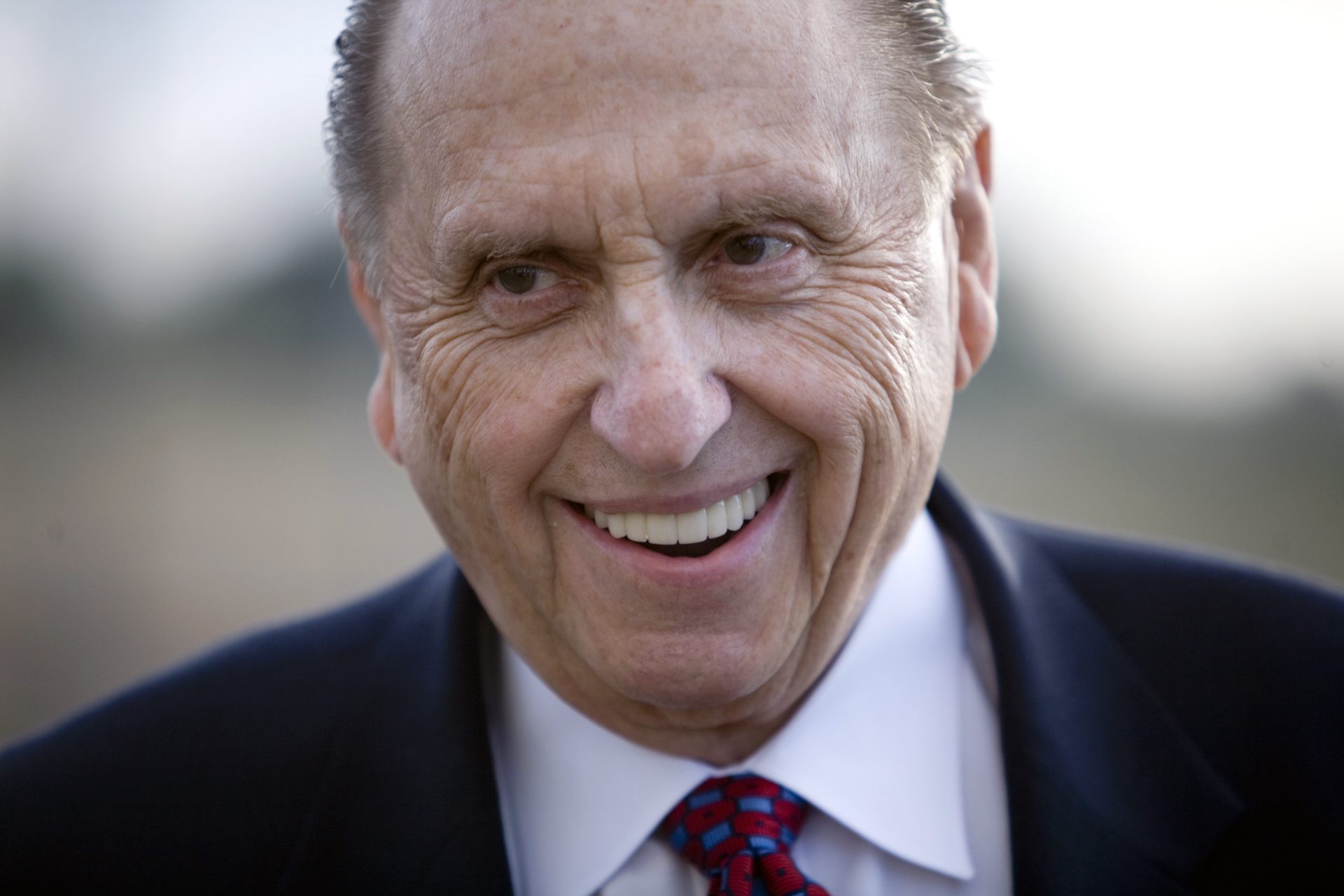
Thomas S. Monson '74, President of the Church of Jesus Christ of Latter-day Saints

=== Alumni ===
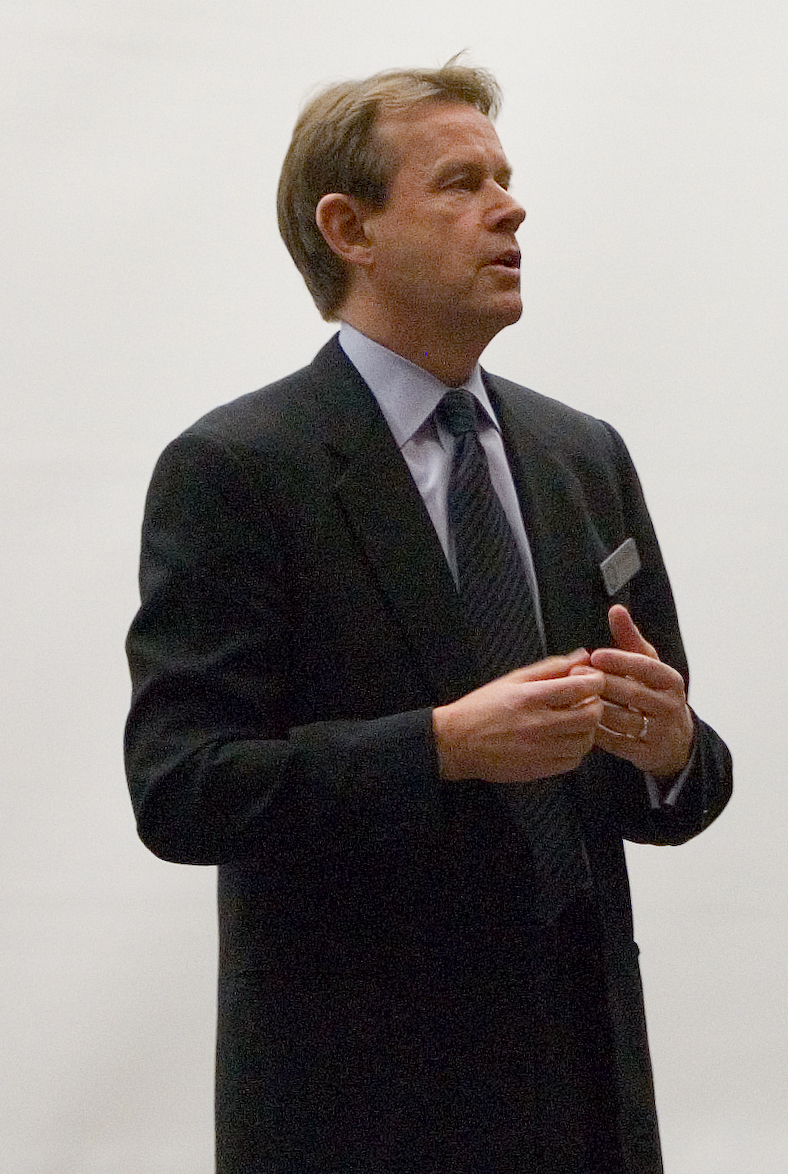
Kevin Rollins '84, former CEO of Dell

Numbering 55,000, graduates from the Marriott School have been deemed "first among recruiters" by BusinessWeek in 2008. Top recruiters include Ernst & Young, PricewaterhouseCoopers, Deloitte & Touche, KPMG, HP, Intel, Cisco, and Goldman Sachs. For 2024, MBA graduates averaged $120,881 in post-graduation salary, MPA graduates $66,506, MAcc graduates $79,596, MISM graduates $84,403, and management undergraduates $72,794.

There is also a strong contingency of Marriott School alumni who pursue a career in academia, with BYU being ranked #8 nationally for the number of students who go on to earn PhDs. This is due in part to the MAcc PhD Prep Track and the BYU Honors Program.

Alumni of the Marriott School of Management who are prominent in business include Citigroup CFO Gary Crittenden 1976, former Dell CEO Kevin Rollins 1984, former Intermountain Health Care CEO Bill Nelson '67, and Krispy Kreme president Jeffrey B. Welch '84. In education, Alison Davis-Blake '82 is president of Bentley University, John Grout '84 is Dean of the Campbell School of Business at Berry College. Alumni in other fields include Thomas S. Monson '74, former president of The Church of Jesus Christ of Latter-day Saints and chairman of the BYU Board of Trustees, violinist Lindsey Stirling '15, and three-time NFL Super Bowl champion Bart Oates '82.

Many alumni also choose to participate in the BYU Management Society, which was founded in 1977 by Dean Merrill J. Bateman. The organization is an alumni association "with inclusivity", inviting non-alumni to join as well. The fourfold mission of the society is networking, career development, supporting BYU and the Marriott School, and community service. The Society membership is now at 6,000 members in 40 U.S. cities and 10 countries.

== See also ==
- List of United States business school rankings
- List of business schools in the United States
- List of deans of the Marriott School of Management
