= Kevin Rollins =

Former President & CEO of Dell Inc.

Kevin B. Rollins
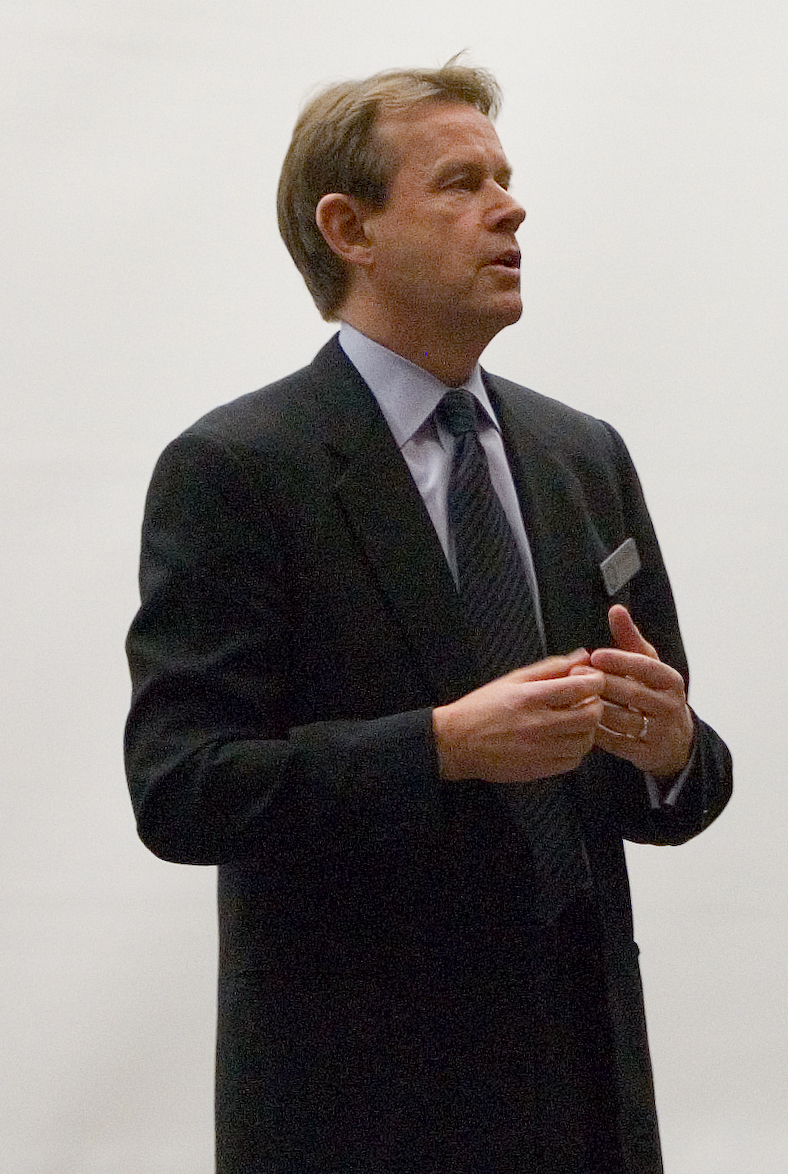
- Born: November 15, 1952 (age 74); Provo, Utah, United States
- Education: B.S. Humanities (1983); B.S. Civil Engineering (1983); MBA (1984)
- Alma mater: Brigham Young University
- Occupations: Senior Advisor, TPG Capital
- Known for: Former President & CEO of Dell Computers
- Spouse: Debra
- Children: 4

Kevin Barney Rollins (born November 15, 1952) is an American businessman and philanthropist. The former president and CEO of Dell Inc., in 2006 Rollins was named by London's CBR as the 9th Most Influential person in the Enterprise IT sector.

== Biography ==
Rollins was born and raised in Utah and met his wife, Debra, while attending Brigham Young University (BYU). While at BYU, Rollins earned a bachelor's degree in humanities and civil engineering in 1983 and an MBA a year later. Before joining Dell in April 1996, Rollins was vice president and partner of Bain & Company where he specialized in strategies and management for high technology and consumer product clients. He helped develop strategies that propelled Dell into a commanding position in the direct selling of computer systems in the United States.

Rollins became the chairman of the American Enterprise Institute's Board of Trustees on January 1, 2009.

== Dell Computer ==
Rollins worked at Dell for over a decade in various positions, including Senior VP of Corporate Strategy (1996), president of Dell Americas (1996–2001) overseeing operations in the United States, Canada, Mexico, and Latin America, COO (2001–2004), president (2001–2007), and CEO (2004–2007). During the last four quarters of his leadership, the company employed approximately 50,000 workers worldwide and reported revenues of $45.4 billion.

While at Dell, Rollins oversaw company plans to spend more on staff training and customer services, and sales increased $14.2 billion—up 6% year on year with a net income of $762 million. He also announced that Dell would add support for AMD chips. The company has only used Intel microprocessors previously. In 2006, Forbes magazine listed Rollins as the 18th highest compensated CEO in the world at $39.31 million for achieving a 9% decline in stock performance during his tenure with a stock performance that was 81 percent that of the S&P 500. He also oversaw one of the largest layoffs that Dell had until then (2006–2007) of 8000 people worldwide. There was resentment at his below-par decisions and execution, which could have contributed to his removal from Dell. Rollins was fired from Dell in January, 2007.

Upon leaving Dell in 2007, Rollins was paid $48.5 million in cash related to expired stock options. On July 22, 2010 Rollins was among current and former Dell executives charged by the SEC in a fraudulent accounting case. The case was settled with Rollins reportedly paying $4 million.

== Philanthropic efforts ==
Rollins is a member of the BYU's President's Leadership Council and the Marriott School National Advisory Council, where he founded and continues to fund the Rollins Center for Entrepreneurship and Technology. He also serves at the request of the president of the United States on the Advisory Committee for Trade Policy and Negotiation and is a member of the Computer Systems Policy Project and the U.S. Business Council. Rollins is also active in the American Enterprise Institute and the Juvenile Diabetes Research Foundation.

His philanthropy has also extended to financially support various political campaigns, including most recently Mitt Romney's bid for the Republican nomination for the U.S. Presidency.

== Appointments and awards ==
- Utah Information Technology Hall of Fame (Inducted in 2004)
- BYU President's Leadership Council Executive Committee Member
- BYU eBusiness Center Advisory Board Executive Committee Member
- BYU Marriott School National Advisory Council, Public Relations Committee Member
- Austin Symphony Orchestra Board of Directors (Member At-large)
- KRLU Public Television Board of Directors
- U.S. Presidential Advisory Committee for Trade Policy and Negotiation Member
- 2006 BYU Marriott School of Management Convocation speaker

== Personal life ==
Rollins and his wife have four children and nine grandchildren.
