= Brigitte C. Madrian =

Behavioral economist

- Citizenship: American
- Education: Brigham Young University, Massachusetts Institute of Technology
- Occupations: Professor; Administrator
- Spouse: David Madrian
- Children: 2

Brigitte C. Madrian is a behavioral economist and is the ninth dean of the Marriott School of Business at Brigham Young University (BYU). She is the first woman to serve as dean and has a joint appointment in the Department of Finance and the George W. Romney Institute of Public Service and Ethics.

== Career ==
Before coming to BYU, Madrian was the Aetna professor of Public Policy and Corporate Management in the John F. Kennedy School of Government at Harvard University from 2006 to 2018. She was also a faculty member at the University of Pennsylvania Wharton School from 2003 to 2006, the University of Chicago Graduate School of Business from 1995 to 2003, and the Harvard University Economics Department from 1993 to 1995. She is also a research associate at the National Bureau of Economic Research and served as co-director of the NBER Household Finance working group.

Madrian's research focuses on behavioral economics and household finance, with a particular focus on household saving and investment behavior. She also uses the lens of behavioral economics to understand health behaviors and improve health outcomes.

Madrian received a PhD in economics from the Massachusetts Institute of Technology and studied economics as an undergraduate at BYU. She is a recipient of the Retirement Income Industry Association Achievement in Applied Retirement Research Award (2015) and a three-time recipient of the TIAA Paul A. Samuelson Award for Scholarly Research on Lifelong Financial Security (2002, 2011 and 2017).

== Personal life ==
Madrian is married to David Madrian. They have two daughters and live in Highland, Utah. She is a member of the Church of Jesus Christ of Latter-day Saints.
