= Warren, Utah =

Unincorporated community in the state of Utah, United States

Warren
- Township
- Location within Utah Location within the United States
- Coordinates: 41°17′01″N 112°07′20″W
- Country: United States
- State: Utah
- County: Weber
- Settled: 1870
- Named for: Lewis Warren Shurtliff
- Elevation: 4,219 ft (1,286 m)
- ZIP code: 84404
- Area codes: 385, 801
- GNIS feature ID: 1447187

Warren is a township and unincorporated community in Weber County, Utah, United States. Originally settled in 1870 under the name of Salt Creek, it was renamed in 1896 in honor of Lewis Warren Shurtliff, the local stake president of the Church of Jesus Christ of Latter-day Saints.

Historical population
Census	Pop.	Note	%±
1900	276		—
1910	433		56.9%
1920	233		−46.2%
1930	293		25.8%
1940	451		53.9%
1950	303		−32.8%
Source: U.S. Census Bureau
