= Jay Lorsch =

American business theorist (1932–2025)

Jay William Lorsch (October 8, 1932 – August 5, 2025) was an American organizational theorist and the Louis Kirstein Professor of Human Relations at the Harvard Business School, known for his contribution of contingency theory to the field of organizational behavior.

== Life and career ==
Born in St. Joseph, Missouri, Lorsch grew up in Kansas City, Missouri, where he graduated from the Pembroke Country-Day School in 1950. He received his Bachelor of Arts from Antioch College in 1955, his Doctor of Business Administration from the Harvard Business School in 1964, and started his academic career at the Harvard Business School in 1965.

Together with Paul Lawrence, Lorsch was awarded the Academy of Management's "Best Management Book of the Year Award" in 1969 for their book "Organization and Environment". This book "added contingency theory to the vocabulary of students of organizational behavior."

He and his wife resided in Cambridge, Massachusetts. Lorsch died on August 5, 2025, at the age of 92.

== Publications ==
Lorsch published a dozen books, including:

- Organization and Environment (with Paul R. Lawrence) (1967)
- Understanding Management (1978)
- Organizational Behavior (1987)
- Pawns or Potentates: The Reality of America's Corporate Boards (1989)
- Aligning the Stars: How to Succeed When Professionals Drive Results (with Thomas J. Tierney) (2002)
- Back to the Drawing Board: Designing Boards for a Complex World (with Colin B. Carter) (2003)
- Restoring Trust in American Business (Leslie Cohen Berlowitz and Andy Zelleke eds.) (Cambridge: MIT Press, 2005)
