= James L. Barker =

American historian and missionary

James Louis Barker (27 July 1880 – 29 May 1958) was an American historian and a missionary for the Church of Jesus Christ of Latter-day Saints.

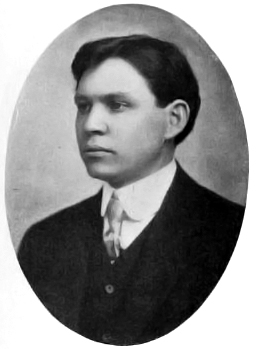
James L. Barker 1911

He was also an educator.

== Early life ==
Barker's mother, the former Margaret Stalle, was a native of Italy, who was a Waldensian before she joined The Church of Jesus Christ of Latter-day Saints. Barker received his early education in the Weber County (Utah) School District and the University of Utah (B.A., 1901). Barker then served as a missionary for The Church of Jesus Christ of Latter-day Saints in the Swiss–Austrian Mission of the LDS Church. After his return from this mission in 1904, he began an extensive study of foreign languages in Europe. He studied at the Sorbonne and the Catholic Institute in Paris. He also studied at the University of Marburg and at universities in Geneva and Neuchâtel. In 1907, Barker along with Joseph Evans prepared the second edition of the French language Book of Mormon by dividing the text of the first edition (1852) into chapters and verses and adding cross references to reflect the format of the English version of the Book of Mormon.

== Career ==
In 1906, Barker married Kate Montgomery. After his return to the United States, he was hired as Principal of Weber Academy (now Weber State University) and later as Chair of Brigham Young University's fledgling language department. In 1919, he was appointed head of the University of Utah's Modern Language Department, a position he held for almost three decades. He is the author of the book Apostasy from the Divine Church which is a scholarly account of what he viewed as the decline and fall of the Christian Church not too many years after the times of the early Apostles. His book cites extensively from early historical sources, not all of which are documented because of his death before the publication of the book. The point of view is that of the LDS Church, but it is not an official church publication. The book was published by Barker's wife in 1959, then went out-of-print for a number of years, was re-published in 1985, and is again out-of-print.

== LDS Church service ==
In 1944, Barker was serving as the president of the Argentine Mission of the LDS Church. In this year he organized the first branch of the church in Uruguay. He continued to serve as president of the Argentine mission until 1944.

From 1947 to 1950 Barker served as the president of the French Mission of the LDS Church. The mission included all of France as well as French-speaking Switzerland and the Walloon region of Belgium.

Barker also sent missionaries into Italy to try to contact church members there. In a talk in one of the 1951 General Conferences of the LDS Church Barker expressed a desire for missionaries of the LDS Church to soon share the gospel in Spain, Italy, Greece and other countries of the Mediterranean. After this David O. McKay gave Barker the assignment to work to reestablish the LDS Church in Italy. This effort was delayed by the death of Barker in a car accident in 1958.

In September 1947, Barker and his wife accompanied Archibald F. Bennett and James M. Black on their three-week trip to the Piedmont Region of northern Italy in which they microfilmed records for the Genealogical Society of Utah.
