= Public Accounting Report =

Public Accounting Report is a monthly eight-page newsletter that covers competitive intelligence and the business side of the public accounting profession.

== History and profile ==
The publication was founded in 1978. The magazine is based in Chicago, Illinois. It was sold in 2002 by Strafford Publications to Wolters Kluwer, where it is managed under the company's CCH brand. Paper and digital versions are available.

Among its proprietary features are the PAR Top 100, an annual ranking of the 100 largest accounting firms in the United States; and the PAR Professors Survey, an annual ranking of the best accounting programs in the United States based on the opinions of accounting professors at American universities.
