= Wilford M. McKendrick =

Wilford McGavin McKendrick (June 12, 1870 – May 11, 1936) served as principal of Weber Stake Academy, the predecessor of Weber State University from 1908 to 1910.

McKendrick was raised in Tooelle, Utah. He had received both high school and college education at Brigham Young Academy and had been a member of that school's faculty. Among other positions McKendrick served as the librarian at Brigham Young Academy. McKendrick had been a faculty member at Weber Academy before he became the principal, filling the vacancy left by David O. McKay when he resigned to serve as a member of the Quorum of the Twelve Apostles of the Church of Jesus Christ of Latter-day Saints (LDS Church).

McKendrick was a Latter-day Saint. In the LDS Church he was a counselor in the Ogden Stake presidency.
