= Gary C. Cornia =

American professor (born 1948)

- Born: 1948 (age 77–78)
- Education: B.S. (1972) Economics; M.S. (1974) Economics; Ph.D. (1979) Public finance
- Alma mater: Weber State University; Utah State University; Ohio State University
- Occupation: Dean of the Marriott School of Management at Brigham Young University

Gary C. Cornia is an American professor who was the eighth Dean of the Marriott School of Management at Brigham Young University. He received a B.S. in Economics in 1972 from Weber State University, and a M.S. in Economics two years later from the Jon M. Huntsman School of Business at Utah State University. He subsequently earned a Ph.D. in Public finance from the Ohio State University in 1979. Cornia served as dean from 2008 to 2013.
