= Association of Certified Fraud Examiners =

Professional organization

- Abbreviation: ACFE
- Formation: 1988
- Legal status: Professional organization
- Headquarters: Austin, Texas
- Coordinates: 30°16′19.7904″N 97°45′0.5256″W
- Region served: Worldwide (180 countries)
- Members: More than 92,000
- Chairman: Joseph T. Wells
- President: John D. Gill
- Main organ: Board of Regents
- Website: www.acfe.com

The Association of Certified Fraud Examiners (ACFE) is a professional organization of fraud examiners. Its activities include producing fraud information, training and tools. Based in Austin, Texas, the ACFE was founded in 1988 by Joseph T. Wells. The ACFE grants the professional designation of Certified Fraud Examiner (abbreviated CFE).

== Founder ==
Joseph T. Wells founded the ACFE and is its chairman. After graduating from the University of Oklahoma, he worked for ten years with the Federal Bureau of Investigation, during which time he investigated the former Attorney General John N. Mitchell's involvement in Watergate.

In addition to his duties as chairman, Wells writes, researches and lectures to business and professional groups on white-collar crime issues. He has written books and articles on fraud prevention and detection. His writings appear in professional journals.

== Fraud museum ==
The ACFE runs a fraud museum containing exhibits linked to famous frauds, which is open to the public. America's Guide to Fraud Prevention, written by the convicted felon and confidence trickster Steve Comisar, is on display in the ACFE fraud museum. The book is considered a piece of fraud history.

== Reports and statistics ==
According to a 2014 report, companies lose 5% annually due to fraud, and most often this happens in the accounting department. In a 2018 report, the Association of Certified Fraud Examiners stated that up to 28% of small businesses have been involved in some form of fraud, with the figure ranging from 22% to 26% for larger companies. As a result of research conducted by the ACFE in 2022, it was found that professional fraud leads to losses in excess of $3.6 billion annually, especially as a result of misappropriation of assets.

== See also ==
- Frankensteins of Fraud, published by the ACFE
- Fraud Advisory Panel charity, corporate member organisations
