= Public relations of the Church of Jesus Christ of Latter-day Saints =

Although the media has always been important in the church's growth, public relations of the Church of Jesus Christ of Latter-day Saints (LDS Church) has become increasingly important since the church's growth internationally after World War II. By the 1960s and 1970s, the LDS Church was no longer primarily an Intermountain West–based church, or even a United States–based church. The church's organized public relations efforts have deep roots. The Bureau of Information, the predecessor of the Temple Square Visitors Centers was started on Temple Square in Salt Lake City with Le Roi Snow, a son of Lorenzo Snow, as the first director.

== History of church public relations ==
The origins of the use of the media to spread the message of the church can be traced to the formation of the Radio, Publicity and Missionary Literature Committee in 1935. This organization was headed by Stephen L Richards, of the Quorum of the Twelve, with Gordon B. Hinckley serving as the executive secretary and initially as the only employee. During the 1930s, the Committee developed film strips for use by church missionaries.

In 1957, the church split the Radio, Publicity and Missionary Literature Committee into the Church Information Service with the goal of communicating the church's message to the media and an internal communications department. The Church Information Service worked with the goal of being ready to respond to media inquiries and generate positive media coverage. The organization kept a file to provide photos to the media for church events, such as temple dedications. It also would work to get stories covering Family Home Evening, the church welfare plan, and the church's youth activities in various publications.

In 1972, the Church Information Service was renamed the Department of Public Communications. In 1973, it was renamed again to the Public Communications Department. That same year church president Lee gave the first TV interview done by a church president. It was also placed directly under the supervision of the First Presidency, unlike most church departments that were directed through the Quorum of the Twelve. At this point, Wendell J. Ashton was the director. Shortly after this, supervision of LDS Visitors Centers and production of ads produced by the church was added to the department's responsibilities. To assist with these aspects, Heber Wolsey, Brigham Young University's public relations director, was recruited. The department then came out with the Homefront ads with their tag line, "Family: isn't it about time?".

== Disseminating church principles ==
The first church-wide standardized plan for teaching church principles to potential proselytes was created in 1953 and named "A Systematic Program for Teaching the Gospel". It was built on the foundation of LeGrand Richards's A Marvelous Work and a Wonder and Richard L. Anderson's organized set of discussions for the church. In 1961, this system was enhanced, expanded, and renamed "A Uniform System for Teaching Investigators." This new system, in the form of a hypothetical dialogue with a fictional character named "Mr. Brown," included intricate details for what to say in almost every situation. These routinized missionary discussions would be further refined in 1973 and 1986, and then de-emphasized in 2003.

In 1973, the church recast its missionary discussions, making them more family-friendly and focused on building on common Christian ideals. The new discussions, named "A Uniform System for Teaching Families", de-emphasized the Great Apostasy, which previously held a prominent position just after the story of the First Vision. When the discussions were revised in the early 1980s, the new discussions dealt with the apostasy less conspicuously, and in later discussions, rather than in the first discussion. The discussions also became more family-friendly, including a flip chart with pictures, in part to encourage the participation of children.

In 1982, the church renamed its edition of the Book of Mormon to "The Book of Mormon: Another Testament of Jesus Christ".

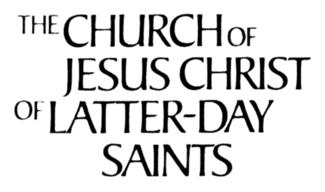
Pre-1995 church logo

In 1995, the church announced a new logo design that emphasized the words "Jesus Christ" in large capital letters, and de-emphasized the words "The Church of" and "of Latter-day Saints". Subsequently, and along the same vein, in 2001, the church issued a press release encouraging reporters to use the full name of the church at the beginning of news articles, with following references to the "Church of Jesus Christ". The release discouraged the use of the term "Mormon Church". Church leaders at the same time acknowledged that the connection of the term "Mormon" with the church was not going away.

In 1999, the church launched a second website, FamilySearch.org, which focused on its genealogy work.

== Key Cities Plan ==
By the early years of the 21st century, the LDS Church had developed a "Key Cities Plan" to focus various efforts of outreach. One part of this program was the use of genealogy work to reach ethnic groups that had not been traditionally attracted to the church. Various outreaches to African Americans were conducted, especially with the compilation of the Freedmen's Bank Records and presentations given by Darius Gray.

Other outreach efforts included those to the Haitian community in Miami, Florida, with specifically targeted activities and efforts connected with the dedication of a chapel in the Haitian area.

== The church and the media ==
In addition to its varied websites and other official channels, the church has produced a series of films, and PSAs.

=== Select films ===
- Short films: Man's Search for Happiness (1964), Mr. Krueger's Christmas (1980), How Rare a Possession (1987), Together Forever (1987)
- Feature-length films: Legacy: A Mormon Journey (1990), The Mountain of the Lord (1993), The Testaments of One Fold and One Shepherd (2000), Joseph Smith: The Prophet of the Restoration (2005)

== See also ==
- Latter Day Saints in popular culture
- Tabernacle Choir at Temple Square
- Name of the Church of Jesus Christ of Latter-day Saints
- Michael Otterson
- Richard E. Turley, Jr.
