= Merrill Jenson =

American composer and arranger (born 1947)

- Born: January 20, 1947 (age 79); Richfield, Utah
- Origin: Provo, Utah
- Occupation: Film score composer
- Years active: 1976-present

Merrill Boyd Jenson (born January 20, 1947) is an American composer and arranger who has composed film scores for over thirty films including Emma Smith: My Story, Joseph Smith: Prophet of the Restoration, The Testaments of One Fold and One Shepherd, Legacy, Harry's War, and Windwalker. Many of the films Jenson composed music for were directed by Academy Award-winning director Kieth Merrill. Jenson has also composed several concert productions including a symphony that premiered at Carnegie Hall. Additionally, he has composed music for many television commercials including the acclaimed Homefront ads, music for three outdoor pageants, and several albums. Jenson lives in Provo, Utah with his wife Betsy Lee Jenson.

== Early life ==
Jenson was born in Richfield, Utah on January 20, 1947. He was introduced to music at an early age with his mother teaching him how to conduct music in front of a mirror while listening to recordings of the Mormon Tabernacle Choir. She also taught him to play the piano while his father taught him the trumpet. He attended Brigham Young University where he directed the BYU Cougar Marching Band and graduated with a degree in Music Composition. Soon after graduating, Jenson took on odd jobs at the film studios in Los Angeles in order to be near the industry. While there he was able to meet and associate with some of the great film composers of the day.

== Career ==
Jenson eventually landed a few tiny composing projects at the LDS Motion Picture Studios. His big break came when he met director Kieth Merrill. Merrill hired Jenson to compose the score to the sequel of his Academy Award-winning documentary The Great American Cowboy. Jenson’s score to The Great American Indian was recorded with him conducting the London Philharmonic Orchestra. This was the first of many collaborations between Jenson and Merrill including Windwalker Harry's War, and Take Down.

Jenson worked for many years with Bonneville Communications writing music for films and commercials for the Church of Jesus Christ of Latter-day Saints including The Phone Call (1977). During this time Jenson composed music for the award-winning Homefront commercials and films such as How Rare a Possession: The Book of Mormon. Later he also wrote the music for the three films that have played in the Legacy Theater in the Joseph Smith Memorial Building on Temple Square in Salt Lake City, Utah: Legacy, The Testaments of One Fold and One Shepherd, and Joseph Smith: Prophet of the Restoration.

Jenson collaborated with award-winning composer Sam Cardon to compose the music for three PBS documentaries by producer and director Lee Groberg: Trail of Hope: The Story of the Mormon Trail, American Prophet: The Story of Joseph Smith, and Sacred Stone: Temple on the Mississippi. A career highlight for him was composing the score for the critically acclaimed film Emma Smith: My Story which played in many theaters across the country.

Jenson has taught music composition at Brigham Young University since 2008, and at Snow College since 2012.

== Film and soundtrack scores ==
- The First Vision (1976)
- John Baker's Last Race (1976)
- The Great American Indian (1976)
- The Mailbox (1977)
- The Phone Call (1977)
- The Great Brain (1978)
- Three Warriors (1978)
- Where Jesus Walked (1978)
- Uncle Ben (1978)
- The Emmett Smith Story (1979)
- Blind Love (1979)
- The Trophy Case (1979)
- Take Down (1979)
- Windwalker (1980)
- In One Blinding Moment (1980)
- Oakland Temple Pageant (1980)
- Harry's War (1981)
- The Red Fury (1984)
- One Fold, One Shepherd - musical (1984)
- Washington DC Visitor Center - film (1984)
- Grand Circle - Zion Canyon Visitor Center (1985)
- Mormon Battalion Visitors Center - film(1986)
- How Rare a Possession: The Book of Mormon (1987)
- Alamo: The Price of Freedom (1988)
- On Our Own (1988)
- Nora's Christmas Gift (1989)
- Remembering Nauvoo - Nauvoo Visitors Center (1989)
- Carthage Jail Visitors Center - film (1989)
- Legacy (1990)
- Polynesian Odyssey (1991)
- The Seventh Brother (1991/1994)
- Froboland - water screen projection (1995)
- Second Chance (1996)
- Trail of Hope: The Story of the Mormon Trail (1997) with Sam Cardon
- The Witness (1997)
- Alyson's Closet (1998)
- The Book of Mormon Video Soundtrack (1999)
- The New Testament Video Soundtrack (1999)
- The Testaments of One Fold and One Shepherd (2000)
- American Prophet: The Story of Joseph Smith (2000) with Sam Cardon
- Bug Off! (2001)
- Water with Food Coloring (2001)
- Horse Crazy (2001)
- Out of Step (2002)
- Sacred Stone: Temple on the Mississippi (2002) with Sam Cardon
- Almost Perfect - musical (2002)
- Manti Miracle Pageant (2002)
- Hill Cumorah Visitors Center - film (2003)
- Kirtland, Ohio Visitors Center - film (2003)
- Joseph Smith: Prophet of the Restoration (2005)
- Praise to the Man (2005)
- Profile of a Prophet - musical (2005)
- Mesa Temple Pageant (2005)
- Martin Harris Pageant (2007)
- Emma Smith: My Story (2008)
- Friends for Life (2008)
- Demographic Winter (2008) with Arlen Card
- Demographic Bomb (2009)
- Horse Crazy 2:The Legend of Grizzly Mountain (2010)
- The Lost Civilizations of North America (2010)
- The Boathouse Detectives (2010)
- Masque (2012)
- Washington DC Temple Visitors Center - film (2013)
- Mexico Temple Visitors Center - film (2014)
- The Infinite Gift (2015)

== Concert productions ==
- The Clancy Brothers (1992). Irish folk music for the Utah Symphony.
- The Garden (1995). Allegorical oratorio co-written with Michael McLean and Bryce Neubert.
- Pioneer Portrait (1998). Suite for concert band.
- Come Unto Christ (1999). Oratorio commissioned by Brigham Young University-Idaho.
- This is Christmas (2000). Mormon Tabernacle Choir Christmas concert with Roma Downey and Gladys Knight.
- Viking Saga (2003). Symphony that premiered at Carnegie Hall.
- Legacy Suite for Orchestra (2004). Performed in Park City, Utah.
- String Quintet in F Major (2004). For the Brigham Young University-Idaho Faculty String Quintet.
- How Glorious the Voice of God (2005). Song cycle for the Brigham Young University Opera Department.
- Music & the Spoken Word (2006). With Sissel and the Mormon Tabernacle Choir commemorating the centennial of Norwegian independence.
- Concert of Orchestral Works (2010). Conducting the Murray, Utah Symphony.
- O Little Town of Bethlehem (2010). Performed in the Libby Gardner Concert Hall at the University of Utah.
- Gloria by John Rutter (2012). Orchestrated for British Brass Band
- Chanson De Nuit (2013). Orchestrated for Orchestral Winds.
- A Canyon People's Portrait (2014). Overture composed and premiered in Kanab, UT.
- Spirit of Yosemite (2015). Premiered by the Utah Premier Brass.

== Discography ==
- Beyond (1992) with the London Philharmonic Orchestra
- Encore (1992)
- In A Land Called Israel (1993) with The Mormon Tabernacle Choir
- Noel (1993) with The Mormon Tabernacle Choir
- This Is Christmas (1994) with The Mormon Tabernacle Choir
- The Nativity Story (1994) with The Mormon Tabernacle Choir
- The Garden (1995) with Michael McLean and Bryce Neubert
- Pioneer Portrait (1996)with the National Philharmonic Orchestra
- Merry Christmas (1997)
- High on a Mountaintop: Hymns of the Restoration (2004) with the Prague Symphony Orchestra
