= Alan Cherry =

American actor (1946–2024)

Alan Gerald Cherry (February 14, 1946 – July 4, 2024) was one of the few African American converts to the Church of Jesus Christ of Latter-day Saints (LDS Church) prior to the 1978 revelation allowing Black Mormon men to become priests. From 1985-1989, he was director of Brigham Young University's African-American Oral History Project, and recorded interviews with over 200 African-Americans converts to Mormonism across the United States.

== Biography ==
Born and raised in New York City, Cherry as a teenager was in the 1963 March on Washington for Jobs and Freedom during which Martin Luther King Jr. gave his "I Have a Dream" speech. In 1966, he enlisted with the US Air Force, and was posted to Abilene, Texas. While there, he met a Mormon serviceman, and joined the LDS Church in 1968. In the early 1970s Cherry played and provided comedy routines in the Mormon rock bands Sons of Mosiah, which had Orrin Hatch as their manager, and The Free Agency. Cherry studied at Brigham Young University (BYU), graduating with a BA in sociology and an MA in organizational behavior, and was an original member of the Young Ambassadors, a touring performing group. In June 1978 he received the priesthood, shortly after LDS Church President Spencer W. Kimball received divine revelation allowing black Mormon men to become priests. In 1979, Cherry sought and was called on a Mormon mission to Oakland, California. He later served in high local church callings, and was often invited to speak about his experience as a pre-1978 convert.

In 1985, Cherry was appointed project director of BYU's LDS African-American Oral History Project, and over the next few years, interviewed over 200 African-Americans in Utah and across the United States. Doing this, Cherry met Janice Barkum, whom he married in the Salt Lake Temple in 1987, and with whom he has had three children. He spoke about his findings in 1988 at a symposium on the tenth anniversary of the revelation of the priesthood, and at other presentations in subsequent years. The interviews were edited into a video entitled Black Legacy: The history of Blacks in Utah. Cherry co-authored an entry on "Blacks" in the 1992 Encyclopedia of Mormonism.

Cherry appeared in Mormon Kieth Merrill's 1981 film Harry's War as an IRS agent. He was also cast as a freed slave in the Mormon inspirational film Joseph Smith: Prophet of the Restoration.

Cherry died on July 4, 2024, at the age of 78.

== Bibliography ==
- 1970 - It's You and Me, Lord! My Experience as a Black Mormon (Trilogy Arts)
- 1992 - with Jessie Embry: "Blacks", in Encyclopedia of Mormonism, 4 vols., Daniel H. Ludlow et al., eds., (New York: Macmillan), Volume 1, page 125.

== Discography ==
- 1970: The Sons Of Mosiah : Live In Washington D.C. (Y' Man's Music)
