= Reed Smoot (cinematographer) =

American cinematographer

- Born: United States
- Occupation: Cinematographer

Reed P. Smoot A.S.C. is a United States cinematographer associated with many successful IMAX documentaries and theme park rides. He also did the cinematography for The Great American Cowboy, which won the 1973 Academy Award for best documentary feature.

Smoot is a Latter-day Saint. He received a BA in Advertising from BYU in 1969, and is married to his wife Julia.

== Cinematography ==
- Are You Listening? (1971)
- The Great American Cowboy (1973)
- The Lost Manuscript (1974)
- Cipher in the Snow (1974)
- The First Vision (1976)
- John Baker's Last Race (1976)
- The Phone Call (1977)
- The Mailbox (1977)
- The Gift (1977)
- Where Jesus Walked (1978)
- Uncle Ben (1978)
- The Great Brain (1978)
- The Emmett Smith Story (1979)
- Take Down (1979)
- The Trophy Case (1979)
- In One Blinding Moment (1980)
- Windwalker (1981)
- Harry's War (1981)
- The Avenging (1982)
- Mountain Charlie (1982)
- Ballet Robotique (1982)
- The Last Leaf (1983)
- When Your Lover Leaves (1983)
- Grand Canyon: The Hidden Secrets (1984)
- Rainbow War (1985)
- Lots of Luck (1985)
- Door to Door (1985)
- The Long Hot Summer (1985)
- Spirit Lodge (1986)
- Louis L'Amour's Down the Long Hills (1986)
- The Wraith (1986)
- Russkies (1987)
- The Pump (1988)
- Alamo: The Price of Freedom (1988)
- Gleaming the Cube (1989)
- Legacy: A Mormon Journey (1990)
- Back to Neverland (1990)
- Don't Tell Her It's Me (1990)
- Lucy & Desi: Before the Laughter (1991)
- To Be an Astronaut (1992)
- Homeward Bound: The Incredible Journey (1993)
- The Mountain of the Lord (1993)
- Rubdown (1993)
- Yellowstone (1994)
- The Women of Spring Break (1995)
- Zion Canyon: Treasure of the Gods (1996)
- Imagine Indiana (1996)
- Special Effects: Anything Can Happen (1996)
- Not in This Town (1997)
- Divided by Hate (1997)
- Dinosaur (1998)
- No Laughing Matter (1998)
- Mysteries of Egypt (1998)
- Olympic Glory (1999)
- Galapagos: The Enchanted Voyage (1999)
- Out of Annie's Past (2000)
- Cirque du Soleil: Journey of Man (2000)
- Shackleton's Antarctic Adventure (2001)
- All Access: Front Row. Backstage. Live! (2001)
- China: The Panda Adventure (2001)
- The Human Body (2001)
- Ultimate X: The Movie (2002)
- Jane Goodall's Wild Chimpanzees (2002)
- The Young Black Stallion (2003)
- Mystery of the Nile (2005)
- Mystic India (2005)
- Lincoln's Eyes (2005)
- The Work and the Glory: American Zion (2005)
- Journey Across India (2007)
- Mummies: Secrets of the Pharaohs (2007)
- Mysteries of the Great Lakes (2008)
- Hannah Montana & Miley Cyrus: Best of Both Worlds Concert (2008)
- Wild Ocean (2008)
- Jonas Brothers: The 3D Concert Experience (2009)
- Justin Bieber: Never Say Never (2011)
- Titans of the Ice Age (2013)
- Superpower Dogs (2019)
- Dinosaurs of Antarctica (2020)
