= Arlen Card =

American composer and arranger

- Born: 11 April 1961; Redwood City, California
- Occupation: Composer/Arranger
- Years active: 1984-present

Arlen Card (born 11 April 1961) is an American composer and arranger. He is a Latter-day Saint and is the younger brother of Orson Scott Card. He was, among other interests, actively involved in both basketball and the saxophone during his youth. After serving two years as a missionary for the LDS Church in Chile, he studied music and law at Brigham Young University. He currently teaches several audio and corporate classes in the Digital Media department at Utah Valley University. He and his wife, Jennifer, have six children.

== Selected filmography ==
- Wind Dancer (1993)
- The Mountain of the Lord (1993)
- Heaven Sent (1994)
- Reach for the Stars (1995)
- The Trek West (1996)
- The Handcart Pioneers (1997)
- Joseph Smith: The Prophet of the Restoration (2005) with Merrill Jenson
- Tears of a King (2007)
- $1.11 (2008)
- Once Upon a Summer (2009)
