= Sam Cardon =

American musician

- Genres: Classical, Jazz, Soundtrack
- Occupation: Composer
- Instrument: Piano
- Years active: 30
- Website: http://samcardon.mysyte.us

Sam Cardon is an American musician and composer known for his work in film music for fictional movies and documentaries.

== Biography ==
Cardon grew up in Farmington, New Mexico, and received a bachelor's degree from Brigham Young University in 1993. He received the Distinguished Honored Alumnus award from Brigham Young University in 2006. He also received the Governor's Mansion Artist Award from Governor and First Lady Michael and Jacalyn Leavitt from the State of Utah in 2003.

He serves on the Board of Trustees of Snow College, on the Community Relations Board of Utah Valley University and on the College of Fine Arts and Communications Board of Brigham Young University.

== Credits ==
Cardon's credits include many full-length features, including Titans Of The Ice Age, Mummies, Mystic India, Texas, The Big Picture, Forces Of Nature, Lewis and Clark, The Legendary Journeys, Shackleton's Antarctic Adventure, Mysteries of Egypt, Olympic Glory, Whales, Building the Dream at Hearst Castle in San Simeon, California; Treasure of the Gods at Zion National Park, Utah and The Secret of San Francisco at Pier 39.

In addition, he has written or co-written the themes for National Geographic Explorer, ABC Sunday Night at the Movies, Good Morning America, and provided three hours of original music for the 1988 Winter Olympic Games in Calgary, and music for the 2002 Winter Olympic game Closing Ceremonies at Salt Lake City. He has also written music for over 40 independent films: My Girlfriend's Boyfriend, Highway To Dhampus, The Velveteen Rabbit, Little Secrets, Beau Jest, The Work And The Glory, American Zion, A House Divided, Return To Secret Garden, The Assignment, Davie And Golimyr, The Wild Stallion. His documentary music includes Fires Of Faith, American Prophet, The Trail Of Hope, America's First Freedom and Meet The Mormons. Video game credits include World of Warcraft, Overwatch, Jet Moto and Twisted Metal.

== Discography ==
- Impulse (1989) (#2 in Radio And Records Magazine for national airplay)
- Serious Leisure (1991) (#2 in "Radio and Records Magazine" and #17 on Billboard's Contemporary Jazz Chart)
- Innovators (1993) with Kurt Bestor - WordPerfect Demo CD ("Missing The Snake Priest" & "La Capitana")
- Innovators (1995) with Kurt Bestor
- Coming Full Circle (1995) with Kurt Bestor
- The New Testament Video Soundtrack (1999) with Kurt Bestor
- Old Testament Video Songs (1999)
- The Book of Mormon Video Soundtrack (1999) with Kurt Bestor
- Doctrine and Covenants and Church History Video Soundtrack (1999) with Kurt Bestor
- Digability (2000)
- Earth Cinema (2000)
- Innovators II: Keepers of the Flame (2001) with Kurt Bestor
- Innovators – Live Concert
- Faithful
- Redemption Road

Producer:

- Kalai "Acoustacism"
- Kalai "Rebel Hands" (co-producer)

Producer and Arranger:

- Jenny Oaks Baker, Then Sings My Soul Billboard #1 on the Traditional Classical Chart
- Josh Wright, Josh Wright Billboard #1 on the Traditional Classical Chart

== Film scores ==
- On Our Own (1988)
- Nora's Christmas Gift (1989)
- Rigoletto (1993) with Kurt Bestor & Michael McLean
- The Seventh Brother (1994) with Kurt Bestor and Merrill Jenson
- Friendship's Field (1995)
- Hearst Castle: Building the Dream (1996) IMAX
- Zion Canyon Treasure of the Gods (1996) IMAX
- Trail of Hope (1997) with Merrill Jenson
- Whales (1997) IMAX
- Mysteries of Egypt (1998) IMAX
- Olympic Glory (1999) IMAX
- Return To Secret Garden (2000)
- Brigham City (2001)
- American Prophet: The Story of Joseph Smith (2000) with Merrill Jenson, Gregory Peck
- Shackleton's Antarctic Adventure (2001) IMAX
- Little Secrets (2001)
- Lewis & Clark Great Journey West (2002) IMAX
- The Work and The Glory (2002)
- Jumping For Joy (2002)
- Someone Was Watching (2002)
- Sacred Stone: Temple On The Mississippi (2002) with Merrill Jenson
- Texas, The Big Picture (2003) IMAX
- Innovators (2003)
- The Work And The Glory (2004)
- Forces Of Nature (2004) IMAX
- The Work and the Glory II: American Zion (2005)
- Small Fortunes (2005)
- By the Hand of Mormon: Selections From the Original Musical Production with David Piller
- Mystic India (2005) IMAX
- The Work and the Glory III: A House Divided (2006)
- Fire On Ice: The Saints Of Ireland (2006)
- The Dance (2006)
- Mummies: Secrets of the Pharaohs (2007) IMAX
- Heber Holiday (2007)
- Passage To Zarahemla (2007)
- Reserved To Fight (2008)
- Beau Jest (2008)
- Davie And Goimyr (2008) stop-motion animation
- The Velveteen Rabbit (2009) animated feature
- The Wild Stallion (2008)
- The Assignment (2010)
- Slow Moe (2010)
- My Boyfriend's Girlfriend (2010)
- The Writer's Block (2010) TV series
- Justin Time (2010) TV series pilot
- The Messiah (2010) TV series documentary
- The Legato Line (airing in 2010)
- American Ride (2011) TV series
- The Soul of Kalaupapa (2011)
- Fires of Faith (2012) documentary
- World of Warcraft: Mists of Pandaria (2012) Global Music Award Winner
- Titans Of The Ice Age (2013) IMAX
- Highway to Dhampus (2013)
- Kama' Aina (2013)
- Granite Flats TV series (2013)
- Man in the Moon (2013) Glenn Beck and The American Dream Labs
- Meet the Mormons (2014)
