= The Mormons (miniseries) =

- Written by: Jane Barnes; Helen Whitney
- Directed by: Helen Whitney
- Country of origin: United States
- Original language: English

Production
- Producer: Helen Whitney
- Editor: Ted Winterburn

Original release
- Network: PBS
- Release: April 30 – May 1, 2007

The Mormons is a four-hour PBS documentary about the Church of Jesus Christ of Latter-day Saints (LDS Church). The production originally aired in two-hour segments on April 30 and May 1, 2007. It was produced by Helen Whitney, and was the first joint production of Frontline and American Experience.

== Content ==
The first segment is about the history of The Church of Jesus Christ of Latter-day Saints. It recounts the life of Joseph Smith, along with his First Vision and the subsequent visit of the Angel Moroni who gave him the golden plates, from which the Book of Mormon is said to be translated. The topic of anti-Mormonism is also discussed, followed by an episode about Mormonism and polygamy and the Mountain Meadows massacre.

The second segment is about the contemporary LDS Church. It profiles Mormon missionaries, followed by the September Six and a discussion of homosexuality and The Church of Jesus Christ of Latter-day Saints. The final parts cover Mormonism and women and the personal growth experienced by returned missionaries.

== Reviews ==
The New York Times said about the documentary: "Yet the portrait of the modern-day church, which the program says has 12 million members worldwide, is compelling nonetheless." On the other hand, The Boston Globe criticised the documentary: "The Mormons brims with informed talking heads – church historians, journalists, church elders, and a constellation of happy Mormons. It would have helped to identify Mormon from non-Mormon but never mind. Mitt Romney appears briefly in a film clip but is never heard from; according to PBS, he declined to participate." Reuters however said: "If there is a weak point to this hugely informative and watchable series, it may be the amount of time allocated in the second night to the practice of Mormon missions and the church's heavy-handed approach to critics. Regardless, this is a brilliant work on a engaging topic." The Nation was also disappointed by this documentary.

== See also ==
- Latter Day Saints in popular culture
- Mormons
- Public relations of The Church of Jesus Christ of Latter-day Saints
