= The Great American Cowboy =

- Theatrical release poster
- Directed by: Kieth Merrill
- Written by: Douglas Kent Hall
- Produced by: Kieth Merrill
- Starring: Larry Mahan; Phil Lyne
- Narrated by: Joel McCrea
- Cinematography: Reed Smoot
- Edited by: Kieth Merrill
- Music by: Harold Farberman
- Distributed by: American National Enterprises; Walt Disney Productions(video release)
- Release date: 1974
- Running time: 89 minutes
- Country: United States
- Language: English
- Budget: $300,000

The Great American Cowboy is a 1974 documentary film about the sport of rodeo. The film, which was directed by Kieth Merrill, is notable for its use of experimental editing and camera techniques. The film focuses on the 1973 battle for the Rodeo Cowboys Association (RCA) all-around world championship race between seasoned veteran rodeo star Larry Mahan and more recent champion Phil Lyne. Voiceover narration is provided by Hollywood actor Joel McCrea. The film won the 1974 Academy Award for Best Documentary Feature.

== See also ==
- List of American films of 1974
- Amazon, the 1997 short film that earned Merrill his second Oscar nomination
