= Emma Smith: My Story =

- Directed by: T. C. Christensen; Gary Cook
- Written by: Gary Cook
- Produced by: Ron Munns; Gary Cook
- Starring: Katherine Nelson; Nathan Mitchell; Patricia Place; Kalvin Stringer
- Cinematography: T. C. Christensen
- Edited by: Wynn Hougaard
- Music by: Merrill Jenson
- Release date: April 11, 2008
- Running time: 97 minutes
- Language: English
- Box office: $881,787

Emma Smith: My Story is a 2008 film that focuses on the life of Emma Smith, wife of Joseph Smith, restorer of the Latter Day Saint movement. It was produced by the Joseph Smith and Emma Hale Smith Historical Society.

== Production ==
The film portrays the life of Emma Smith. It begins in 1879 and is narrated by an older, widowed Emma. The story unfolds as she explains the early events of her life to her adopted daughter, Julia Murdock Smith. Much of the footage comes from unused shots taken during the production of Joseph Smith: The Prophet of the Restoration, which was produced by the Church of Jesus Christ of Latter-day Saints, and the lead actors are in both films.

The film's producers stated the intended audience was primarily the descendants of the Smiths. After its initial debut in Utah, the film also premiered in select places where many of Emma's descendants live, including Independence, Missouri, some cities in Montana, and even Sydney, Australia.
