= Statue of Thomas L. Kane =

Statue in Salt Lake City, Utah, U.S.

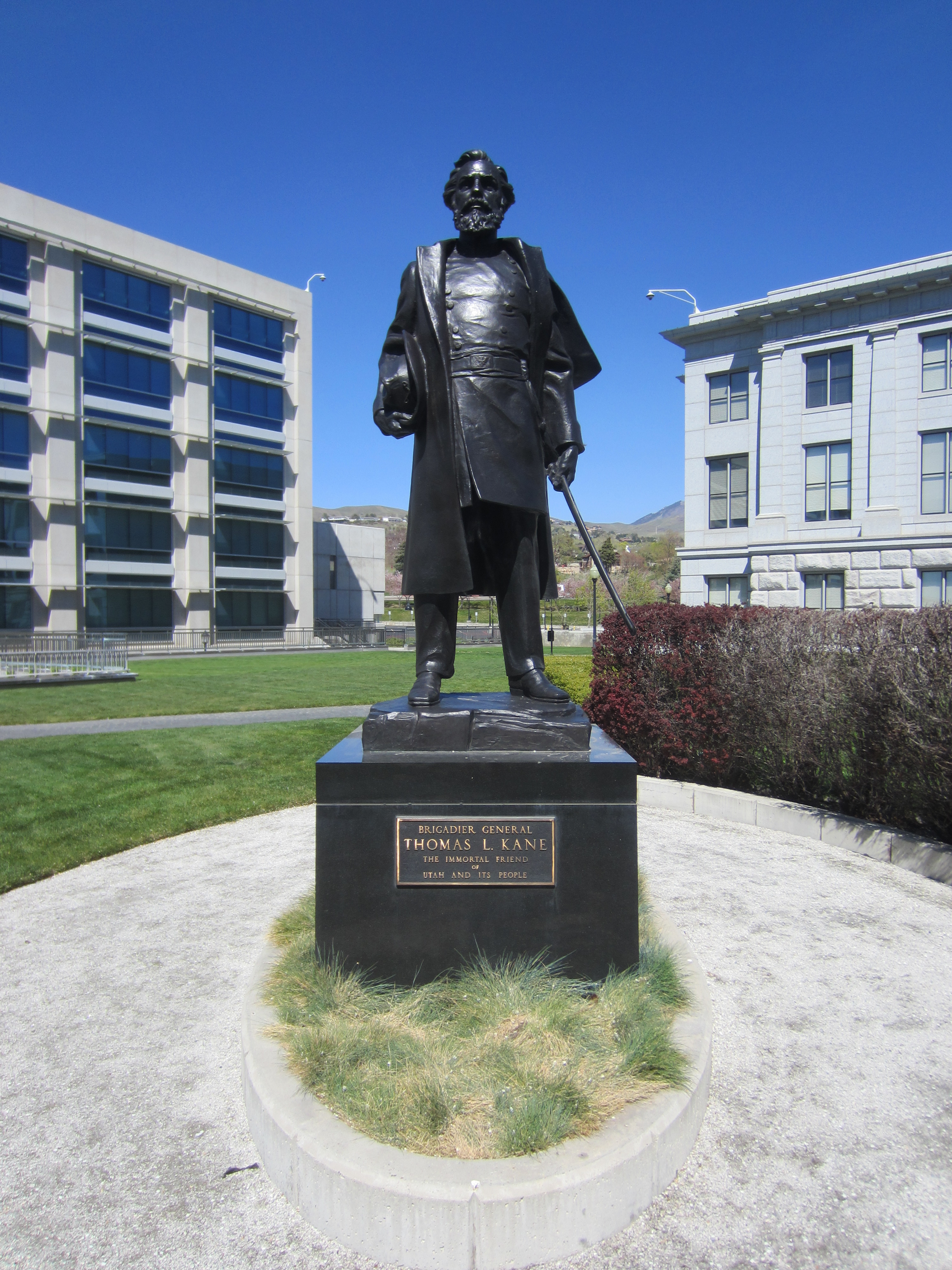
- The statue in 2021
- Artist: Ortho R. Fairbanks
- Subject: Thomas L. Kane
- Location: Utah State Capitol; Salt Lake City; 40°46′41.7″N 111°53′16.6″W

A statue of Thomas L. Kane by Ortho R. Fairbanks is installed outside the Utah State Capitol in Salt Lake City, in the U.S. state of Utah.
