= Gail Tremblay =

American artist and writer from Washington, U.S. (1945–2023)

- Born: December 15, 1945; Buffalo, New York, United States
- Died: May 3, 2023 (aged 77); Olympia, Washington, United States
- Citizenship: American
- Education: BA University of New Hampshire, MFA University of Oregon
- Known for: Installation art, basket weaving, poetry

Gail Tremblay (December 15, 1945 – May 3, 2023) was an American writer and artist from Washington State. She is known for weaving baskets from film footage that depicts Native American people, such as Western movies and anthropological documentaries. She received a Washington State Governor's Arts and Heritage Award in 2001.

== Background ==
Tremblay was born on December 15, 1945, in Buffalo, New York. She claimed her father was of Mi'kmaq and Onondaga ancestry, and that her great-grandfather once lived in Kahnawake near Montreal. She never offered any documentation of this and the U.S. Department of the Interior’s Indian Arts and Crafts Board determined that she was not Indigenous after a thorough investigation of her claims. Her father was Roland G. Tremblay (1917–2013), who was born in Somersworth, New Hampshire, to Peter Tremblay and Bernadette Demers Tremblay.

Gail Tremblay received her BA in theater in 1967 from the University of New Hampshire and an MFA in English (Creative Writing) from the University of Oregon, Eugene in 1969.

== Writing and education career ==
Tremblay was a faculty member at The Evergreen State College in Olympia, Washington and taught courses in English, art history, and Native American studies. She began her faculty appointment at Evergreen in 1980 and taught her last class in 2018 in the newly finished fiber studio at the Longhouse. She was recognized by the Poetry Foundation. Tremblay also wrote exhibition catalog essays about other artists, including, "Speaking in a Language of Vital Signs," for the 2008 exhibition catalogue, Joe Feddersen: Vital Signs at the Hallie Ford Museum of Art at Willamette University.

== Visual art ==
An Iroquois Dreams That the Tribes of the Middle East Will Take the Message of Deganawida to Heart and Make Peace (2009), Smithsonian American Art Museum

Tremblay described her work as combining historical Native American techniques and materials with mainstream artistic expression. Her poetry and art were inspired by the cultures of Indigenous peoples of the Northeastern Woodlands.

Tremblay says she learned basketry from her aunts, but "update[d] them for a contemporary audience" through the use of modern materials such as film stock and film leader. Tremblay's art draws from Native American history, Indigenous cosmologies, along with literature, Western movies, and other pop culture references. She created a basket using red and white film leader entitled, And Then There's the Business of Fancydancing, inspired by Sherman Alexie's film, The Business of Fancydancing (2002), in which the main character, a Spokane man, is lovers with a white man. Tremblay describes the work, saying, "I chose to use Porcupine Stitch because there are so many difficult and prickly relationships between characters in this film.” The film influence on her baskets also includes When will the Red Leader Overshadow Images of the 19th Century Noble Savage in Hollywood Films that Some Think are Sympathetic to American Indians (2018), a basket woven using 35mm movie film from the movie Windwalker (1981), which was acquired by the Smithsonian American Art Museum in 2021.

Artweek reviewer Marcia Morse writes, “And Then There is The Hollywood Indian Princess (2002). Using the Northeastern Woodlands fancy-stick basket weaving, Tremblay wove with, not brown ash and sweetgrass used by Northeastern tribes, but recycled 16 mm leader and film on sexually transmitted diseases, elegantly subverting multiple stereotypes.”

== Exhibitions ==
Tremblay'sy solo exhibitions and group shows include Gail Tremblay: Fiber, Metal, Wood (1988), Museum of the Plains Indian, Browning, Montana; The Empty Fish Trap Installation (2004), Evergreen State College Gallery, Olympia, Washington; Gail Tremblay: Twenty Years of Making (2002), Daybreak Star Cultural Center, Seattle; Reframing Images, Conceptualizing Indigenous Art (2013), Froelick Gallery, Portland, Oregon;and Art of Gail Tremblay (2017), Eastern Washington University Downtown Gallery, Cheney, Washington.

== Works in public collections ==
- Basket (c. 1990), Portland Art Museum, Oregon
- Strawberry and Chocolate (2000), National Museum of the American Indian, Smithsonian Institution, Washington, D.C.
- In the World of White Line Fever... (2001), Hallie Ford Museum of Art, Salem, Oregon
- And Then There is the Hollywood Indian Princess (2002), Hallie Ford Museum of Art, Salem, Oregon
- Waiting for the Return: 5 Fish Traps (2002-2003), Marian Gould Gallagher Law Library, University of Washington School of Law, Seattle (Washington State Arts Commission)
- A Note to Lewis and Clark's Ghosts (2004), Hallie Ford Museum of Art, Salem, Oregon; and National Museum of the American Indian, Smithsonian Institution, Washington, D.C.
- The Ghost of Salmon (2004), from Canopy End Structures (with Rick Bartow, Ken Mackintosh, and Lillian Pitt), Rosa Parks Station, TriMet, Portland, Oregon
- Hunting for the Red Queen on the Big Night Out (2008), Evergreen State College, Olympia, Washington (Washington State Arts Commission)
- An Iroquois Dreams That the Tribes of the Middle East Will Take the Message of Deganawida to Heart and Make Peace (2009), Whatcom Museum, Bellingham, Washington
- And Then There's the Business of Fancy Dancing... (2011), Arkansas Museum of Fine Arts, Little Rock
- In Great Expectations, There is no Red Leader (2011), Portland Art Museum, Oregon
- It Was Never About Playing Cowboys and Indians (2012), Denver Art Museum
- When Ice Stretched on for Miles (2017), Brooklyn Museum, New York
- When will the Red Leader Overshadow Images of the 19th Century Noble Savage in Hollywood Films that Some Think are Sympathetic to American Indians (2018), Smithsonian American Art Museum, Smithsonian Institution, Washington, D.C.
- When There Is No Category for a Film in a Native American Language on Oscar Night, Clearly It Is in a League of Its Own (2021), Metropolitan Museum of Art, New York

== Publications ==
- Night Gives Women the Word (Omaha Printing Company, 1979)
- Close to Home (University of Nebraska, 1981)
- Indian Singing in 20th Century America (CALYX Books, 1990)
- Farther From and Too Close to Home (CreateSpace Independent Publishing, 2013)
