= Windwalker (film) =

1981 American Western film

- Theatrical release poster
- Directed by: Kieth Merrill
- Written by: Ray Goldrup
- Produced by: Arthur R. Dubs; Thomas E. Ballard
- Starring: Trevor Howard; Nick Ramus; James Remar
- Cinematography: Reed Smoot
- Music by: Merrill Jenson
- Distributed by: Pacific International Enterprises
- Release date: January 1981 (limited)
- Running time: 108 min.
- Country: United States
- Languages: Cheyenne, Crow, English
- Budget: $3 million
- Box office: $6.4 million

Windwalker is a 1981 Western film directed by Kieth Merrill and written by Ray Goldrup, based on a novel by Blaine M. Yorgason. It stars Trevor Howard and Nick Ramus. The film is set in the pre-colonial Intermountain West, and focuses on the life of a Cheyenne man, who comes back to life to protect his family from Crow warriors and be reunited with his long-lost son. It was filmed in various natural outdoor locations in Utah. Unusually for westerns, all of the characters are Native Americans. Merrill cast Trevor Howard, an English actor, for the role of the aged Windwalker, a decision that stood out in a cast of mostly Native American actors, with authenticity as a main production value.

While Merrill initially thought the film would be his greatest film thus far in his career, he was disappointed with the final decisions his producer made about scoring the film. Merrill gave his director's cut to the American Indian Film Festival, where it premiered in November 1980. Reviews from the time of its release praised its treatment of Native American themes, with at least one negative review that complained about the artificiality of its melodrama. Windwalker was not considered for a foreign language film Oscar because it wasn't possible for a foreign country to nominate it.

Gail Tremblay has used physical film from Windwalker in her artwork, which comments on the unsatisfactory representation of Native Americans in the film.

== Plot ==
Windwalker is an aged Cheyenne warrior. As a young husband and father, he had watched helplessly as his wife, Tashina, was killed and one of their twin sons kidnapped during a raid by rival Crow warriors. After many years of searching unsuccessfully for this son, Windwalker dies during the winter of 1797 in what will become the state of Utah.

After Windwalker's funeral, his remaining son, Smiling Wolf, leads his family south to rejoin the rest of the tribe; on the way they are attacked by a band of Crow warriors and after fighting them off, Smiling Wolf is badly injured and the family is forced to hide.

The Great Spirit reawakens Windwalker, and after battling the forces of nature and his own physical frailty, he rejoins his family. Using Cheyenne medicine to heal Smiling Wolf's wounds, Windwalker leads the family to a sacred Cheyenne hiding cave. From there, he and Smiling Wolf's two young sons prepare booby traps for the Crow raiding party, all of which work perfectly, leaving only the raiding party leader and one other warrior.

The Crow warrior is captured and taken to the cave, where he is revealed to be Windwalker's long-lost son. With his family safe and his son restored to him, Windwalker confronts his old enemy and offers him peace, but the Crow refuses, forcing a final battle. The restored son fights the Crow leader in his father's place and is victorious. Windwalker is now free to proceed to the afterlife, where he is reunited with Tashina.

== Main cast ==
- Trevor Howard as Windwalker
- Nick Ramus as Smiling Wolf/Crow Brother/Narrator
- James Remar as Windwalker as a young man
- Serene Hedin as Tashina
- Dusty McCrea as Dancing Moon
- Silvana Gallardo as Little Feather
- Emerson John as Spotted Deer
- Bart the Bear as The Bear (film debut)

== Production and release ==
Windwalker was a co-production between Pacific International Enterprises and Santa Fe International. It was shot in various outdoor locations in Utah including the Wasatch and the Mirror Lake area in the Uinta Mountains. It was also filmed in the Arches part of the Four Corners area. In an interview after the film's production, Kieth Merrill, who directed the film, said that originally Pacific International agreed not to distribute the film in Utah until the production costs had been paid. In December 1980, Merrill stated that he and other production members were still owed money. A novel by Blaine Yorgason provided the basis for the screenplay by Ray Goldrup. While the Screen Actor's Guild was striking during production, Windwalker received an exception because it was almost complete.

Production was impacted by the eruption of Mount St. Helens. Kieth Merrill later stated that ash was not present in their filming locations, and that production was not impacted at all.

Merrill said that authenticity was important to the production of the film, and stated that "all props and costumes have been carefully researched and recreated." The film's dialogue is spoken in the Cheyenne and Crow languages, with English subtitles. Chief Dan George was favored to play Windwalker, but became ill. Merrill cast Trevor Howard, an English actor, for the role. James Remar played the main character as a young man. Thus, while Native American languages were used to impart authenticity, both young and old Windwalker were played by white actors.

== Reception ==
Windwalker's world premiere occurred at the American Indian Film Festival, which was sponsored by the American Indian Film Institute, dedicated to "recognize and exhibit cinematic art in its application to the historical and contemporary portrayals of American Indians". Merrill initially stated that Windwalker would be "the best picture I have directed." Doug Johnson, his production manager, agreed. However, after the film's release, Merrill said that his producer failed to give him the total creative control they had agreed on, and added "jazzy TV-adventure music" and "an embarrassing number of tom-toms" to the film's score in scenes where he wanted silence or other effects. He stated that he gave the organizers of the American Indian Film Festival "his version" to show at the festival.

Reviews from the time of its release praised its treatment of Native American themes, with at least one negative review that complained about the artificiality of its melodrama. Janet Maslin's review at the New York Times called the film "a feather in [the production] company's hat" that "takes care not to present its Indian characters in the ways Hollywood traditionally has" with a "mostly" Native American cast. A 1980 review by Rick Brough from Park City, Utah gave the film three stars out of five. He complained that the melodrama of the lost twin was predictable, and that the tone of the titular character was inconsistent. Famous movie critics Siskel and Ebert both recommended the film on their show Sneak Previews. Siskel said the film was "a chance to examine the Indian concepts of life and death and their notion of spiritual communication between human beings". Ebert enjoyed how the absence of a white European character forced viewers to identify with the Native American characters. Writing in The Hollywood Reporter in 1981, Robert Osborne wrote that viewers should "enjoy its unusual treatment of Indians (as humans, encountering everyday trials, with nary a white man in sight)". "Mac" at Variety in 1980 wrote that the natural cinematography by Reed Smoot "captures the glories of landscape and weather without indulging in [...] sentimental visual cliches". He also wrote that since all of the characters in the film are Native American, it gave them "a dignity they have been denied previously, even in the most sympathetic westerns". Michael Hilger contradicted the review in a book about Native American portrayals in film in 2016, stating that the Crow tribe had not been portrayed positively. He noted that the way the film is cut increases sympathy for the "good" Cheyenne family. The Cheyenne family is shown from a high angle to accentuate their vulnerability, while their attackers from the Crow Tribe are shown from low-angle close-ups to accentuate their aggression. While the film has only Native American characters, it still portrays them in stereotyped ways, either as a Noble Red Man or a Savage. A 1985 filmography of minority and third world women summarized Windwalker as "an unusual, positive film about Native Americans" but acknowledged that its portrayal of women was limited by Tashina's early death.

There has been some commentary over the casting of Howard, a white man, as the lead. In a newspaper article from Park City's The Newspaper, Merrill said that they didn't want to use Dan George because "the character had to have so much emotion in the face, we needed someone with great stature. There just aren't that many Indian actors of that type around." In a 2005 book on Native Americans and Hollywood movies, Angela Aleiss said the casting decision was because "Hollywood was reluctant to gamble with Native American talent." Osborne's 1981 review supports Aleiss's idea, stating that casting Howard "simulat[ed] commercial acceptance for the film outside the usual Dobs' market." Variety's review wrote that while the casting "may be partially justifiable for commercial reasons, this single lapse in authenticity is a painful one, since the filmmakers went so far in the right direction." In a 2020 book on Native American images in Hollywood film, Frank Berumen assessed Howard's acting: "[he] is not completely convincing as the aged Windwalker." While Windwalker used Native American actors and languages, the casting of Trevor Howard, a British actor, as the main character with makeup to make him look more like a Native American "complicated their messages of cultural respect" according to film professors Harry Benshoff and Sean Griffin.

== Awards ==
Windwalker was not considered for the foreign language Oscars after its release. Since Windwalker included non-English languages, it could be considered a foreign language film, according to the Academy of Motion Picture Arts and Sciences. However, to be eligible for an Oscar, the film had to be nominated by the foreign country where that language originated. No such country existed for Windwalker's nomination. As reported in Provo's Daily Herald, some Native Americans felt upset that Native American languages would be considered foreign. Dusty Ironwing McCrae, who acted in the film, protested that Windwalker was not receiving the recognition it deserved from the film industry.

== In fine art ==
Artist Gail Tremblay used physical film from Windwalker to weave at least three pieces: When will the Red Leader Overshadow Images of the 19th Century Noble Savage in Hollywood Films that Some Think are Sympathetic to American Indians (2018), How Old Stereotypes Never Die (2021) When There Is No Category for a Film in a Native American Language on Oscar Night, Clearly It Is in a League of Its Own (2021). Tremblay saw the film as exemplary of the way Hollywood portrays Native American tribes in a stereotypical way.

== See also ==
- Hollywood Indian
- Portrayals of Native Americans in film

== Works cited ==
- Hilger, Michael (2016). Native Americans in the movies: portrayals from silent films to the present. Lanham Boulder New York London: Rowman & Littlefield. p. 10. ISBN 9781442240018.
- Roger Ebert and Gene Siskel (1981). Sneak Previews with Roger Ebert and Gene Siskel (TV show). WTTW Chicago.
