= The Church of Jesus Christ of Latter-day Saints in Italy =

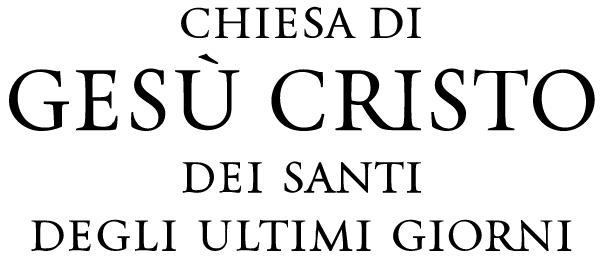
- (Logo in Italian)

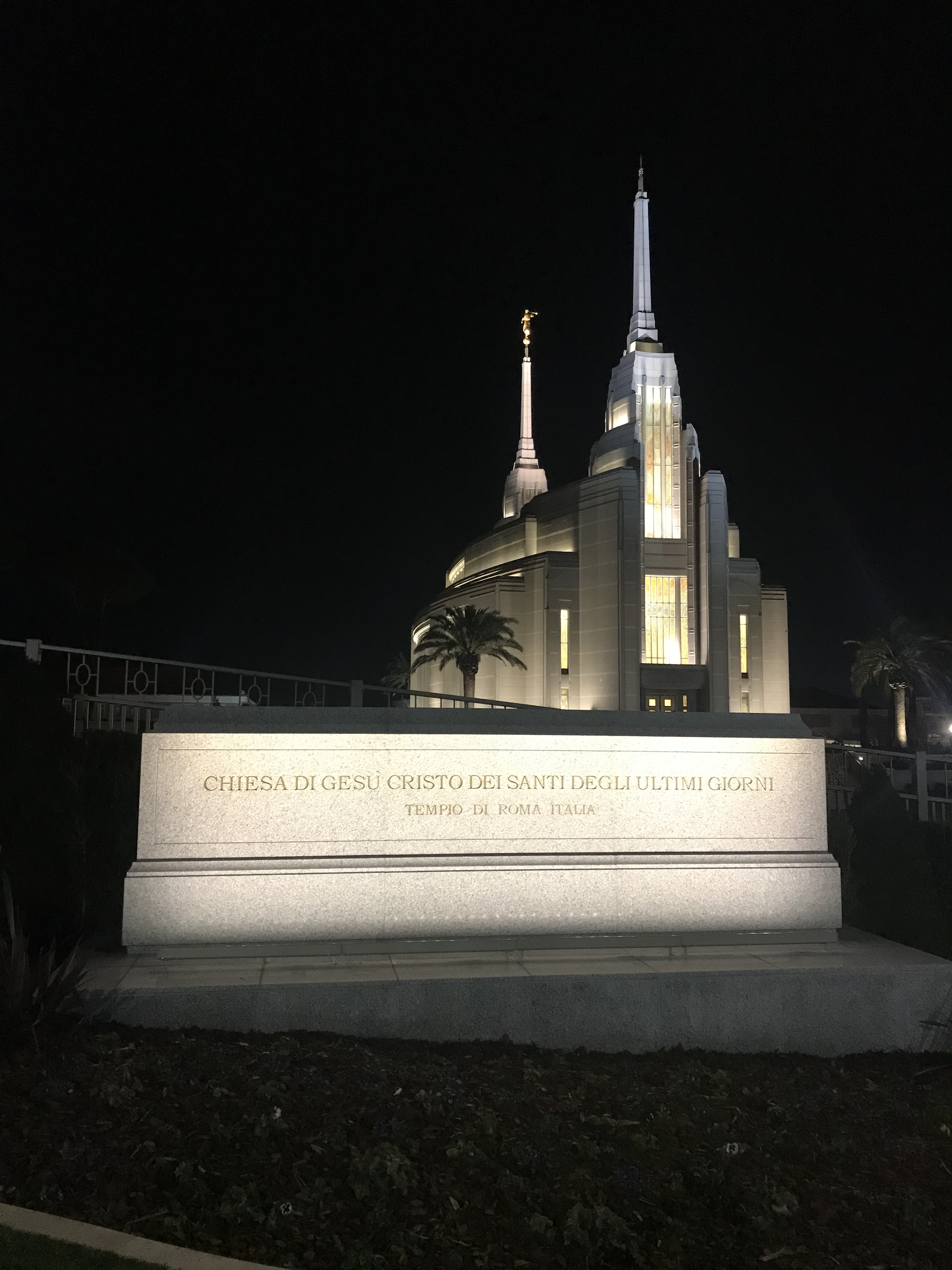
- The Rome Italy Temple
- Area: Europe Central
- Members: 30,105 (2025)
- Stakes: 10
- Wards: 62
- Branches: 29
- Total Congregations: 91
- Missions: 2
- Temples: 1 operating; 1 announced; 2 total
- FamilySearch Centers: 60

The Church of Jesus Christ of Latter-day Saints (LDS Church) has had a presence in Italy since 1850.

== History ==
Membership in Italy
Year	Membership
1967	66
1973	2,307
1979	8,614
1989*	14,000
1999	18,599
2009	22,866
2019	27,486
2025	30,105
*Membership was published as an estimate.

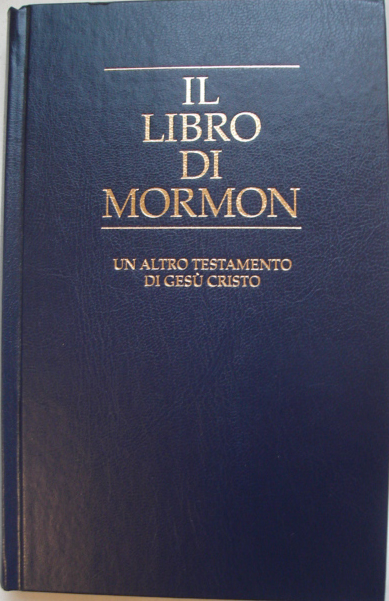
The Italian version of the Book of Mormon, first published in 1852.

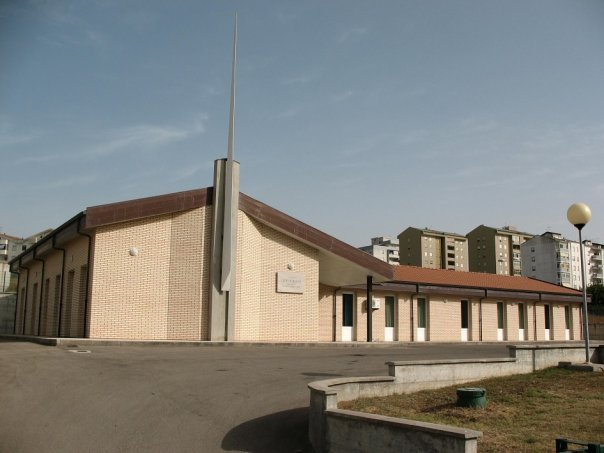
LDS Meetinghouse in Sassari, Italy

=== 19th century ===
During the October 1849 general conference, Brigham Young called Lorenzo Snow and Joseph Toronto to open missionary work in Italy. While en route to Italy, Snow called T. B. H. Stenhouse and Jabez Woodard to serve in the new mission. They arrived in Genoa on 25 June 1850, and Snow offered a prayer dedicating Italy to the preaching of the gospel and organized the Italian Mission on 19 September on a mountain peak near the city of Torre Pellice. On 27 October, Snow baptized the first convert. The first Italian-language edition of the Book of Mormon was published in London in 1852.

In 1853 a group of approximately 70 Waldensians, including men, women, and children left their homes in the Piedmont Valleys and migrated to Salt Lake City, Utah Territory, after being converted by Lorenzo Snow. These Waldensians maintained their cultural heritage, while passing on their mixture of Mormon and Waldensian faiths to their descendants. Their descendants still consider themselves both Mormon and Waldensian, and have met occasionally over the many decades to celebrate both heritages.

The mission closed in 1867, after everyone baptized had either migrated to Utah Territory or left the church.

=== 20th century ===
Unsuccessful attempts were made to resume proselytizing, but legal permission was not granted to do so. Members of the church finally returned to Italy during World War II as foreign servicemen: nearly 2,000 LDS military personnel were in the region during the mid-1940s, and there remains a LDS military presence in Italy ever since.

Vincenzo Di Francesca was one of the first converts in Italy in the 20th century, and his story was documented in the 1987 LDS Church film How Rare a Possession.

In 1964 a new Italian-language translation of the Book of Mormon was published, and Ezra Taft Benson successfully negotiated with Italian government officials to allow missionary work to begin again. In early 1965, elders from the Swiss Mission were assigned to cities in Italy, and on August 2, 1966, Benson reestablished the Italian Mission, with headquarters in Florence. By 1971 there was a second mission opened in Italy, and in 1977 there were four missions: Rome, Catania, Milan, and Padova. That same year Spencer W. Kimball visited Italy, the first church president to do so. After many years of effort, formal legal status in Italy was granted to the church in 1993.

== 21st century ==
In 2008, the church announced the planned construction of the Rome Italy Temple, the first temple in Italy.

In 2016, Massimo De Feo became the first Italian national to be appointed a general authority of the church.

== Stakes ==
As of August 2026, the following stakes had congregations in Italy:

Stake	Organized	Mission	Temple
Alessandria Italy Stake	10 Jun 2007	Italy Milan	Rome Italy
Florence Italy Stake	7 Mar 1971	Italy Milan	Rome Italy
Milan Italy East Stake	16 Sep 2012	Italy Milan	Bern Switzerland
Milan Italy West Stake	7 Jun 1981	Italy Milan	Bern Switzerland
Palermo Italy Stake	19 Mar 1978	Italy Rome	Rome Italy
Puglia Italy Stake	9 Mar 1997	Italy Rome	Rome Italy
Rome Italy East Stake	22 May 2005	Italy Rome	Rome Italy
Rome Italy West Stake	15 Sep 2013	Italy Rome	Rome Italy
Venice Italy Stake	15 Sep 1985	Italy Milan	Rome Italy
Verona Italy Stake	2 Mar 2008	Italy Milan	Rome Italy

== Missions ==
In 1850, the Italian Mission, which mostly focused on the Waldensians in Northern Italy was opened. It was closed in 1854 and any missionary efforts in the country was conducted through the Swiss mission. In 1966, the Italian Mission was organized from a division of the Swiss mission. It was renamed Italy Mission in 1970 and on July 6, 1971 was divided into the Italy North and South Missions. These missions were renamed Italy Milan and Italy Rome missions when the LDS Church changed its naming convention for missions.

=== Malta ===
The Church of Jesus Christ of Latter-day Saints in Malta
- Area: Europe Central
- Members: 320 (2025)
- Branches: 1
- FamilySearch Centers: 1

Some church presence including a branch occurred during the 1850's. However no known church presence occurred after the 1850s until the 1960's when LDS Church members came with the British military. Informal member groups lasted until at least 1972.

The government of Malta granted permission for the Church to have missionaries in the country in January 1980. A branch was organized December 1988. Due to anti-American demonstrations, missionaries left the country in early 1991 and returned in June 1993. The branch was discontinued for a few months in 1991. Malta is currently part of Italy Rome Mission and the Mosta Branch meets at a meetinghouse at the corner of Constitution St and Kurat Schembri in Mosta. A Family History Center is located in the meetinghouse.

== Temples ==
Temples in Italy

The Rome Italy Temple serves most stakes in Italy. Prior to its completion, Bern Switzerland was the nearest temple. A temple to be built in Milan was announced at the October General Conference 2024.

162. Rome Italy Temple; Official website; News & images	
Location: Announced: Groundbreaking: Dedicated: Size:	Rome, Italy; 4 October 2008 by Thomas S. Monson; 23 October 2010 by Thomas S. Monson; 10 March 2019 by Russell M. Nelson; 41,010 sq ft (3,810 m^{2}) on a 14.5-acre (5.9 ha) site
359. Milan Italy Temple (Announced); Official website; News & images	
Location: Announced:	Milan, Italy; 6 October 2024 by Russell M. Nelson

== See also ==
- Religion in Italy
