= Harry's War (1981 film) =

US comedy-drama film

Harry's War (1981)
- Directed by: Kieth Merrill
- Written by: Kieth Merrill
- Produced by: David B. Johnston
- Starring: Edward Herrmann; Geraldine Page; Karen Grassle; David Ogden Stiers; Elisha Cook
- Cinematography: Reed Smoot
- Edited by: Bert Lovitt
- Music by: Merrill Jenson
- Distributed by: American Film Consortium; Taft International Pictures
- Release date: March 1981
- Running time: 98 minutes
- Country: United States
- Language: English

Harry's War is a 1981 American comedy-drama film from American Film Consortium and Taft International Pictures, starring Edward Herrmann, Geraldine Page, Karen Grassle, David Ogden Stiers, Elisha Cook, Salome Jens and Noble Willingham. It was written and directed by Kieth Merrill.

== Plot ==
After his aunt dies of a heart attack while fighting the US Internal Revenue Service (IRS), mild-mannered accountant Harry Johnson decides to take up the cause in what may seem to be an unconventional manner: He declares war on the IRS. After the funeral of Harry's aunt, Harry uses a half-track to sabotage a television interview of his IRS nemesis. Several violent outcomes occur with some anti-government (or, at least, anti-IRS) rhetoric.

== Cast ==
- Edward Herrmann - Harry Johnson
- Geraldine Page - "Aunt" Beverly Payne
- Karen Grassle - Kathy Johnson
- David Ogden Stiers - Ernie Scelera, IRS district director
- Salome Jens - Wilda Crawley, IRS agent
- Elisha Cook, Jr. (as Elisha Cook) - Sergeant Billy Floyd
- James Ray - Croft, IRS commissioner
- Douglas Dirkson - Francis Kane (alias Draper), IRS agent
- Jim McKrell - Roger Scofield, Newsman
- Noble Willingham - Major F. Andrews, United States Army
- Alan Cherry - Chester Clim, IRS agent #1
- Bruce Robinson - IRS agent #2

== Production ==
Parts of the film were shot in St. George, Utah.

== Theatrical run ==
This film saw a limited two-week release in theaters in March 1981.

== Television ==
SelecTV, ONTV and other premium cable movie channels ran the film, premiering on HBO, September 9, 1982, 18 months after its theatrical release, it aired 29 times in the '80s, last appearing, October 24, 1983, but it has never had a network television premiere or any other broadcast in the US since. In the UK, it was shown on Talking Pictures TV in 2021.

== Home media ==
Image Home Video released a VHS version of the film on April 1, 1988 and using the same video transfer also did a DVD release on August 1, 2005.

== Legacy ==
In a mid-1980s interview with David Ogden Stiers, who played the IRS director in the film, was asked what his favorite role had been and the interviewer was expecting him to say something about his character in M*A*S*H, but instead he paused for a second and said "There was this movie about the IRS and I was the biggest [bleep] in the office...."
