= Helen Whitney =

American producer, director and screenwriter

- Education: Sarah Lawrence College
- Occupations: Documentary Filmmaker, Producer and writer
- Website: https://www.helenwhitney.com

Helen Whitney is an American producer, director and writer of documentaries and feature films that have aired on PBS, HBO, ABC and NBC.

Whitney's subjects have included youth gangs, the 1996 American presidential candidates, a Trappist monastery in Massachusetts, the McCarthy Era in the United States, Pope John Paul II, and the late photographer Richard Avedon.

Faith and Doubt at Ground Zero was a PBS two-hour television special on the 9/11 attacks, which explored the spiritual aftershocks of this event. Whitney's film, The Mormons, was a four-hour PBS series and the first collaboration between the PBS programs American Experience and Frontline.

Whitney's film Forgiveness: A Time to Love & A Time to Hate examines the power, limitations—and in rare cases—the dangers of forgiveness through stories ranging from personal betrayal to international truth and reconciliation commissions. This three-hour series aired on PBS in April 2011.

Whitney's 1982 ABC News Closeup documentary about the McCarthy Era, American Inquisition, provoked a libel suit brought by journalist Victor Lasky. Whitney and ABC News were defended by First Amendment lawyer Floyd Abrams. The court ruled in favor of Whitney and ABC News. Abrams remarked, "we won and the broadcast was totally vindicated."

In her feature film work, Whitney has directed actors such as Lindsay Crouse, Austin Pendleton, Blair Brown, Brenda Fricker, and David Strathairn.

Her films have received an Oscar nomination, the Alfred I. duPont–Columbia University Award, an Emmy Award and the George Foster Peabody Award.

== Education ==
Whitney grew up in New York City, where she attended the Chapin School. She received a BA in English literature from Sarah Lawrence College in 1965 and a master's degree in Victorian literature from the University of Chicago in 1967.

== Documentary films (producer, director, writer) ==
Title	Airing Network	Duration	Year released
First Edition	PBS	30 minutes	1975
Youth Terror: The View From Behind The Gun	ABC	60 minutes	1978
The Monastery	ABC	90 minutes	1980
Homosexuals	ABC	60 minutes	1982
American Inquisition	ABC	60 minutes	1983
They Have Souls Too	ABC	60 minutes	1992
Society Class In Great Britain	Turner Network	60 minutes	1992
Richard Avedon: Darkness and Light	PBS: American Masters	90 minutes	1994
The Choice '96	PBS: Frontline	2 hours	1996
John Paul II: The Millennial Pope	PBS Frontline	3 hours	1998
Faith and Doubt At Ground Zero	PBS: Frontline	2 hours	2002
The Mormons	PBS: Frontline and American Experience	4 hours	2007
Forgiveness: A Time To Love And A Time To Hate	PBS	3 hours	2011

== Dramatic feature films (director) ==
Beginning in 1982, following her acceptance by the Sundance Institute, Whitney wrote and directed several dramatic features for television.

Title	Airing Network	Year released
A Town's Revenge	ABC	1997
In The Gloaming	Trinity Playhouse	1997
Every Day Heroes		1990
Lethal Innocence	American Playhouse	1991
First Love. Fatal Love	HBO	1991

== Scripts (writer and co-writer) ==
Title	Role	Airing Station/Location
The Siege	Co-writer	Commissioned by Trinity Playhouse
Change of Heart	Co-writer	Commissioned by American Playhouse
Kale Messenger	Co-writer	Commissioned by Warner Brothers
K.589	Co-writer	Selected by The Sundance Film Festival
Prejudice: Take One	Writer	Commissioned by Highgate Productions
Willa Cather: The Road Home	Co-writer	PBS American Masters
The Rise and Fall of Mark Twain	Co-writer	PBS American Masters
Deliverance	Co-writer	Commissioned for PBS for the 50th anniversary of WW2
Black, White and Blue	Co-writer	HBO
The Song of the Lark	Co-writer	Lifetime Television

== Book ==
In 2011, following the release of her two-part PBS documentary Forgiveness: A Time To Love & A Time To Hate, Whitney wrote a companion book to the film with the same title and a foreword by the Dalai Lama.

== Abbreviated list of awards and nominations ==
Year	Body of Work	Award Received
1977	First Edition	Academy Award Nomination: Best Documentary Short
1978	Youth Terror: The View From Behind The Gun	The San Francisco International Film Festival Award
1978	First Edition	The Robert Flaherty Film Seminar Award
1985	American Inquisition	The Edward R. Murrow Award
1988	They Have Souls Too	The Humanitas Prize
1990	A Town's Revenge	The Humanitas Prize
1995	Richard Avedon: Darkness and Light	The Directors Guild of America: Outstanding Directorial Achievement in Documentary Film
1995	Richard Avedon: Darkness and Light	The Hamptons International Film Festival Award for most popular film
1996	The Choice '96	The Alfred I. duPont-Columbia University Award
1996	The Choice '96	George Foster Peabody Award
1996	The Choice '96	Emmy Award for Outstanding Analysis of a Single Current Story
1996	The Choice '96	The Writers Guild of America Award for Outstanding Script for Television Documentary
2002	Faith and Doubt At Ground Zero	The Alfred I. duPont-Columbia University Award
2002	Faith and Doubt At Ground Zero	The Christopher Award
1999	John Paul II: The Millennial Pope	The Writers Guild of America Award for Outstanding Script for Television Documentary

== Film and lecture presentations ==
Whitney has delivered keynote addresses and lectures at Yale University, the University of California Berkeley, Pomona College, the Harvard Divinity School, the Iliff School of Theology in Denver, Bellarmine University, the John Jay College of Criminal Justice, Syracuse University, the Louisville Presbyterian Theological Seminary and Roanoke College. In 2012, she presented the William Belden Noble Lectures at Harvard University.

She has also spoken at the Corcoran Gallery of Art, the Minneapolis Institute of Art, the Scottsdale Museum of Contemporary Art, the Cathedral of the Assumption in Louisville, KY, and the National Cathedral in Washington, D.C,

== Endowed Lectures ==
- William Belden Noble Lectures at Memorial Church, Harvard University, 2012
- Flagler College Convocation Address for the class of 2012, St. Augustine, Florida
- The Luce Lecture at Boston University, 2007
- The Smith-Pettit Lecture on Mormonism, Salt Lake City, Utah, 2007

== Artist In Residence ==
- Dixie State University
- Brigham Young University
- University of Utah
- Utah Valley University
- Utah State University
- The Studios of Key West
- Stanford University

== Teaching ==
As a 2009 Woodrow Wilson scholar, Whitney has taught at Flagler College, Roanoke College and St. Mary's College.

== Associations ==
- Film Forum, board member and chairman of the board, 1986–1991
- New York Women in Film and Television, board member
- City Church of New York, founding member
