= Niagara: Miracles, Myths and Magic =

- Directed by: Kieth Merrill
- Written by: Ben Burtt; Kieth Merrill
- Produced by: Nicholas J. Gray; Richard W. James
- Starring: Philippe Petit (among others)
- Cinematography: David Douglas
- Edited by: Ben Burtt
- Music by: Bill Conti
- Distributed by: Destination Cinema
- Release date: 1986
- Running time: 41 minutes
- Country: United States

Niagara: Miracles, Myths and Magic (known as Niagara: Legends of Adventure for digital projections) is a 1986 IMAX film directed and produced by Kieth Merrill.

== Overview ==
The film, currently shown every 45 minutes every day on the American and Canadian sides of the Niagara Falls border, shows the history of the Niagara Falls since the earliest legends. The film also shows the creation and history of the Maid of the Mist boats.

In Canada, the movie currently plays at the Greg Frewin Theatrical Centre. It originally played at the IMAX Niagara Falls theatre from 1987 to 2020, which featured 70mm film projection on a 82 ft (25 m) wide screen. The theatre exclusively played Niagara: Miracles, Myths and Magic to the general public, although on June 5, 1998, it hosted a gala screening of Titanic with director James Cameron. On October 27, 2020, the theatre closed to the public, and it was demolished in May 2022. On August 24, 2022, the movie was rebranded as Niagara: Legends of Adventure and was relocated to the Greg Frewin Theatrical Centre. This venue uses digital 4K projection on a 44.72 ft (13.63 m) wide screen, resulting in a smaller picture compared to the original IMAX venue.

In the United States, the movie plays at the Thunder Theater Cafe using digital projection.

== Cast ==
Part of the film's focus is people who braved the falls, such as a tight-rope walker, a barrel rider, and those unfortunate enough to accidentally plunge over the Falls. Actors portraying Annie Edson Taylor, Roger Woodward and Charles Blondin (played by Philippe Petit) appear in the film.
