= I'm a Mormon =

2010 educational outreach campaign by the LDS Church

I'm a Mormon was an educational, advertising and outreach campaign by the Church of Jesus Christ of Latter-day Saints from 2010 to 2018 that aimed to address stereotypes and misconceptions, attempting to educate non-members about the church, by featuring short profiles from church members (also known by the nickname Mormons).

== Campaign ==
Short video clips began airing on American television in January 2011, expanding by October to a television, bus and billboard campaign in 12 US cities and Brisbane, Australia. The executive director of the campaign was Stephen B. Allen. In 2013, the campaign was extended to Ireland and the UK with ads on double-decker buses and the internet, said to be in response to the opening of The Book of Mormon musical in London. In Melbourne during the 2017 run, the church advertised at Southern Cross railway station and elsewhere in the city, as well as on television.

The campaign emphasized facts about LDS Church membership through cultural and racial diversity of individuals profiled, representing (in 2011) more than a million claimed church members in Mexico and Brazil each, and nearly as many in Asia. The campaign included cooperation from lay members who were encouraged to create a profile on the church website to tell about their faith and answer common questions. The campaign has been subject of scholarly articles concerning its relationship with Mormonism and women.

The campaign did not air in Iowa, South Carolina or Florida during the 2011 Republican presidential primary season to avoid causing controversy around Latter-day Saint candidates Mitt Romney and Jon Huntsman.

In October 2018, church president Russell M. Nelson said that the use of nicknames such as Mormon was "a major victory for Satan." As a result, the campaign was discontinued and the mormon.org website was shut down, removing the user generated content and stories.

== Notable participants ==
The following people have appeared as spokespeople in the campaign.

- Alex Boye, musician
- Elaine Bradley, musician
- Rose Datoc Dall, Filipina-American painter
- Ron Dittemore, former NASA flight director; president of ATK Launch Systems
- Brandon Flowers, musician
- Larry Gelwix, rugby coach
- William Hopoate, athlete
- Jane Clayson Johnson, television anchor
- Gladys Knight, singer and actress
- Chad Lewis, athlete
- Mia Love, former member of U.S. Congress
- Rob Morris, athlete
- Lacey Nymeyer, athlete
- Alan Osmond, musician
- Gabe Reid, athlete
- Jon Schmidt, musician
- Mitch Smith, athlete
- Jason Smyth, athlete
- Lindsey Stirling, musician
- Bruce Summerhays, pro golfer
- Patrice Tipoki, musician and actor
- Paora Winitana, athlete
- Jason F. Wright, author and commentator
- Norman Tolk, physicist
