= Berlin (musical) =

Musical written by Erik Orton

Berlin is a musical written by Erik Orton while he was a student at Brigham Young University (BYU) and debuted at the Franklin S. Harris Fine Arts Center in 1999. Orton also composed the music for Berlin.

It later played at Theatre 315 in New York City. In that production the lead female role was played by Nicole Riding.

In 2008 BYU made Berlin into a movie and showed it on BYU-TV. In 2009 it was shown at the LDS Film Festival in Orem, Utah.

== Sources ==
- Meridian Magazine article on Berlin
- Mormon Times Jan 22, 2010
- http://www.mormontimes.com/arts_entertainment/movies/?id=12906
