= Vincenzo Di Francesca =

Vincenzo Di Francesca (23 September 1888 – 18 November 1966) was a member of the Church of Jesus Christ of Latter-day Saints (LDS Church) from 1951 until his death. However, he is most known for his long struggle to become a member of the LDS Church that is documented in the short film How Rare a Possession.

== Discovery of religious book ==
Di Francesca was raised in Italy, where he studied religion. He went to New York City in 1905, where he became a Methodist and graduated from Knox College of New York in November 1909. He then became a pastor.

In February 1910, Di Francesca went to visit a sick pastor in New York City. On his way toward the sick pastor's home as he was walking down Broadstreet, a strong wind moved the pages of an open book lying on a barrel which grabbed his attention. He picked up the book and noticed that it did not have a cover or title page. The first several pages were damaged. He quickly scanned through the book and noticed unknown names to him such as Alma, Mosiah, Mormon, Moroni, and Lamanites. The only name he recognized in the book was Isaiah. He felt that it was a religious text.

After his meeting with the sick pastor, he went to a local drugstore and bought denatured alcohol and cotton balls to clean the damaged pages of the book. He then spent the rest of the day ensconced in his apartment, reading the book. He later described his experience:

For several hours I read the remainder of the pages, which gave me light and knowledge and left me charmed to think of the source from which this fresh revelation had come. I read and reread, twice and twice again, and I found it fit to say that the book was a fifth gospel of the Redeemer.

At the end of the day, I locked the door of my room, knelt with the book in my hands, and read chapter ten of the book of Moroni. I prayed to God, the Eternal Father, in the name of his son, Jesus Christ, to tell me if the book were of God, if it were good and true, and if I should mix its words with the words of the four gospels in my preaching.

I felt my body become cold as the wind from the sea. Then my heart began to palpitate, and a feeling of gladness, as of finding something precious and extraordinary, bore consolation to my soul and left me with a joy that human language cannot find words to describe. I had received the assurance that God had answered my prayer and that the book was of greatest benefit to me and to all who would listen to its words.

== Censure and excommunication ==
Di Francesca began to preach the teachings from the book during his sermons; he drew crowds to his sermons preaching new doctrine found in the book. Observing his new popularity, other ministers began to investigate his teachings. On 24 December 1910, the committee of censure held a disciplinary hearing against Di Francesca. They told him to burn the book he had found. He responded with the following words: “I will not burn the book because of the fear of God. I have asked him if it were true, and my prayer was answered affirmatively and absolutely, which I feel again in my soul as I defend his cause now.”

Di Francesca was brought again to the committee of censure in 1914, and was again directed to burn the book. He again responded: “I can not deny the words of the book nor burn it, since in so doing I would offend God. I looked forward with joy to the time when the church to which the book belonged would be made known to me and I could become part of it.” After saying these words, the council stripped him of his position as pastor of the church.

== Discovery of the LDS Church ==
During the First World War, Di Francesca served in the Italian Army. In May 1930, Di Francesca was looking in a French dictionary for some information, and came across the entry “Mormon.” He read the entry which told him that the LDS Church had been established in 1830 and that this church operated a university in Provo, Utah (Brigham Young University (BYU)). He wrote to BYU's president asking for information about the book and its missing pages. He received an answer two weeks later telling him that his letter had been forwarded to church president Heber J. Grant.

On 16 June 1930, Grant answered his letter and sent a copy of the Book of Mormon in Italian. He told Di Francesca that he would send his inquiry to John A. Widtsoe, the president of the church's European Mission. A few days later, Widtsoe wrote to Di Francesca sending him a pamphlet that contained the story of Joseph Smith, the gold plates, and the coming forth of the Book of Mormon. In this way, Di Francesca finally learned of the origins of the book he found on that barrel of ashes so many years ago.

== Attempts to be baptized ==
On 5 June 1932, Widtsoe came to Naples to baptize Di Francesca, but a revolution between the fascists and anti-fascists had broken out in Sicily, and the police at Palermo refused to let Di Francesca leave the island. The following year, Widtsoe asked Di Francesca to translate portions of Joseph Smith's autobiography into Italian and to have 1,000 copies published. Di Francesca took his translation to a printer, Joseph Gussio, who took the material to a Catholic bishop. The bishop ordered the printer to destroy the material. Di Francesca brought suit against the printer, but only received from the court an order for the printer to return the original booklet.

When Widtsoe was released as president of the mission in 1934, Di Francesca began a correspondence with his successor, Joseph F. Merrill. Merrill arranged to send Di Francesca the monthly church magazine Millennial Star, which he received until 1940 when World War II interrupted the subscription.

In January 1937 Merrill's successor, Richard R. Lyman, wrote that he and president of the church's British Mission, Hugh B. Brown, would be in Rome on a certain day. They said that Di Francesca could meet them there and be baptized. However, the letter was delayed because of war conditions, and Di Francesca did not receive it in time.

From 1940 until 1949, Di Francesca was cut off from all news of the church, but he remained a faithful follower and preached the gospel as he understood it.

== Baptism and church membership ==
On 13 February 1949, Di Francesca sent a letter to Widtsoe at church headquarters in Salt Lake City, Utah. Widtsoe answered his letter on 3 October 1950, explaining that he had been in Norway. Di Francesca expressed a desire to be baptized. Widtsoe asked Samuel E. Bringhurst, president of the church's Swiss–Austrian Mission, to go to Sicily to baptize Di Francesca.

On 18 January 1951, Bringhurst arrived on the island to baptize Di Francesca at Termini Imerese; the first LDS baptism performed in Sicily. When Di Francesca came up out of the water, he said, “I have prayed daily for many years for this moment. My dear Brother and Sister Bringhurst—you can hardly imagine how sweet those words brother and sister are to me. I say them with a feeling of affection and appreciation that I have never before experienced, for I know that you have led me through the door that will eventually bring me back to my Heavenly Father, if I am faithful.”

As the LDS Church expanded in Europe, a temple was built and dedicated in Zollikofen, Switzerland in September 1955. Less than a year after its dedication, Di Francesca traveled there and received his temple endowment (28 April 1956). After his experience in that temple he said, “At last, to be in the presence of my Heavenly Father! I felt that God’s promise had been fully fulfilled—the day had come indeed when the book would be no more unknown to me and I would be able to enjoy the effects of my faith.”

In 1965, Ortho R. Fairbanks was in Italy doing a study of sculpture and was able to obtain a copy of Di Francesca's story which he then gave to the Improvement Era, which was the first to print it. It was later adapted into the film How Rare a Possession by the LDS Church.

== Personal ==
Vincenzo Di Francesca was married in September 1932, to a woman who was not familiar with the LDS Church and his experience to that point with its doctrine. After she learned of his devotion to a church of which he was not yet a member and that was not known in Italy, she left him, saying that he was insane and possessed of a devil—not an uncommon experience for persons who zealously favored another faith instead of the one favored by the national majority at that time. There were no children from the marriage.

Di Francesca died at Gesta Gratten (Palermo), Italy. in November 1966.

== See also ==
- The Church of Jesus Christ of Latter-day Saints in Italy
