= Superpower Dogs =

American TV documentary

- Directed by: Daniel Ferguson
- Written by: Daniel Ferguson
- Produced by: Taran Davies; George Duffield; Dominic Cunningham-Reid; Daniel Ferguson
- Narrated by: Chris Evans
- Cinematography: Reed Smoot
- Edited by: Elric Robichon
- Music by: Michel Cusson
- Production company: IMAX Entertainment
- Distributed by: Mars Petcare
- Release date: March 15, 2019
- Running time: 47 minutes
- Country: United States
- Language: English

Superpower Dogs is a 2019 American documentary film directed by Daniel Ferguson and produced by IMAX Entertainment. The film was narrated by Chris Evans and was theatrically released on March 15, 2019.

== Cast ==
=== Dogs ===
- A Florida-based Dutch Shepherd named Halo.
- A British Columbia-based Border Collie Search and rescue dog named Henry (voiced by Chris Evans) and the film's narrator.
- A Golden Retriever named Ricochet.
- An Italy-based Newfoundland named Reef.
- Two Kenyan bloodhounds named Tipper and Tony, respectively.

=== Humans ===
The professional handlers are:

- Fire Captain Kristian 'Cat' Labrada for Halo.
- Ian Bunbury for Henry.
- Judy for Ricochet.
- Commandante Ferruccio Pilenga for Reef.
- For Tipper and Tony, their handlers are from the Kenya Wildlife Service.

== Reception ==
Courtney Howard of Variety wrote, "This film ought to inspire more than just dog lovers, as the pups are adorable and the lessons about courage, commitment and compassion are exemplary. Not all heroes wear capes — some of them wear collars". Michael Ordona of the Los Angeles Times wrote, "Kids will be “Awww”-ing at the dogs’ shows of affection toward their humans".
