= On Our Own (film) =

1988 US road drama television film by Lyman Dayton

- Genre: Drama; Family
- Written by: Lyman Dayton; Eric Hendershot
- Directed by: Lyman Dayton
- Starring: Leigh Lombardi; Sam Hennings
- Music by: Merrill Jenson; Sam Cardon; Alan Osmond (songs)
- Country of origin: United States
- Original language: English

Production
- Executive producer: Bruce R. Brittain
- Producer: Lyman Dayton
- Production locations: St. George, Utah; Veyo, Utah; Los Angeles
- Cinematography: T.C. Christensen
- Editor: Stephen L. Johnson
- Running time: 84 min.
- Production companies: Commonwealth Cinema; Dayton Film Corp.

Original release
- Release: 1988

On Our Own is a 1988 made-for-television road drama film, directed and produced by Lyman Dayton, and co-written by Dayton and Eric Hendershot.

== Synopsis ==
After the death of their mother, siblings Mitch, Kate, Travis, and Lori Robbins go to the Los Angeles Courthouse with their neighbor, Mrs. Forsythe. She tells the judge they have no family and that she is unable to take them in. Kate tells the Judge and a social worker that they have an Uncle Jack, but they don't believe Kate and the Judge decides to put them in a foster home until they get adopted. In the foster home, they are told Lori is going to be adopted. Refusing to be split up, they make a plan to run away. They escape to their old home where Mitch collects all the money he can find—9 dollars—and his Uncle Jack's address, knowing Jack will know where their father is. They also manage to get their dog back. They then get into their mother's old Volkswagen Beetle and drive away, with neighbors spotting them.

The police are on their trail. They stop at a gas station but with only $1.25 left, they drive away without paying. Mitch later falls asleep at the wheel and gets the children stranded in the desert. Peggy Williams happens to drive past and notice them, they lie in order to get a ride with her. When she stops at a gas station to call the police after she suspects they're lying, Mitch takes the wheel of Peggy's car and drives away.

They successfully manage to escape but they badly damage Peggy's car radiator. The four of them are hungry and stop at a store where Travis wins money on a slot machine with a quarter he picked up from the shop floor. While the children celebrate about the huge amount of money, two gangsters threaten them and claim the money is theirs, since the quarter was theirs. While they are fighting, Peggy—who managed to get a lift—saves them by using a toy gun to bluff the gangsters into leaving.

The children tell her the truth, and as they drive on together, they form a close bond, especially Peggy and little Lori. Peggy's car finally breaks down. They get a lift with a truck driver who drops them off at their uncle's home.

Peggy discovers Uncle Jack is not their real uncle, but rather a wealthy friend of their father's. He welcomes them in and introduces himself, his gold-digging girlfriend Teresa and her son Rhett, who starts a fight with Mitch. Rhett subsequently goes and tattles on them to his mother, placing all the blame on them. Peggy takes the children to a motel for the night. Afterward, Jack reveals to Peggy that the children's father is in prison and Mitch overhears them and sheds tears. The next day, they stop at a café, when suddenly the police arrive. While the police confront Peggy, Mitch, Kate, Lori and Travis escape on a bus, which Mitch drives.

With Peggy and the police in pursuit, a plane suddenly appears and lands in front of the bus, forcing them to stop. The pilot is Jack, who asks if he can become the children's guardian. After the hearing takes place, he is allowed to do so.

== Cast ==
- Scott Warner as Mitch Robbins
- Amy Allred as Kate Robbins
- Tom Dayton as Travis Robbins
- Stephanie Kramer as Lori Robbins
- Leigh Lombardi as Peggy Williams
- Sam Hennings as Uncle Jack
- Jean Roylace as Mrs. Forsythe
- T.C. Christensen as Mr. Forsythe
- Mike Wuergler as Mr. Arnold
- Donré Sampson as L.A. Detective
- Liz Hansen as Nurse Buckman
- Don Dunkenson as Judge
- David Lister as Night Guard
- Leslie Craig as Teresa Waddell
- Jake Marshall as Rhett Waddell
- Tristen Smith as Punk 1
- Kevin Shamo as Punk 2

== Production ==
Parts of the film were shot in St. George, Utah. The Osmond Boys (the sons of Alan Osmond, now performing as The Osmonds Second Generation), performed the main theme, also called "On Our Own", and other incidental songs and music.

The film's video rights were picked up in 1989 by Feature Films for Families, a video distribution company closely associated with certain members of the Church of Jesus Christ of Latter-day Saints (LDS Church). The video release was heavily re-edited, and an additional framing device was filmed by the distributor in which Peggy's mother, over the phone, recounts the events of the film and provides commentary which often contradicts the film itself. Editing movies for content is a common practice in Utah. Though executive producer Bruce R. Brittain was a devout member of the LDS Church, his cavalier personality gave the film an action movie like edginess. Director Lyman Dayton removed his name from the Feature Films for Families version, credited instead as "F.T. Pavlov".

In March 2018, Questar Entertainment released the original version of the movie on DVD for the first time. In spite of having none of the scenes with the elderly woman providing moral commentary on the phone, the Questar version is actually two minutes longer than the Feature Films for Families version because it restores all the scenes that Feature Films for Families had cut.
