= Phil Lyne =

American rodeo cowboy (1947–2026)

Phil Lyne (January 18, 1947 – August 14, 2026) was an American professional rodeo cowboy who competed in the Rodeo Cowboys Association (RCA)/Professional Rodeo Cowboys Association (PRCA). (Note: The Rodeo Cowboys Association changed its name to the Professional Rodeo Cowboys Association in 1975.) He was the RCA Rookie of the Year in 1969. Two seasons later at the National Finals Rodeo (NFR), in 1971, he won the all-around cowboy world championship and the tie-down roping world championship. At the NFR in 1972, he repeated as the all-around world champion cowboy and added a second tie-down roping world championship. Lyne won his first and only steer roping world championship at the National Finals Steer Roping (NFSR) in 1990.

== Early life and career ==
Lyne was born in San Antonio, Texas, on January 18, 1947. As a boy on his family's ranch, he practiced rodeo skills: his father taught him roping, while friends taught him bull riding. Lyne entered his first rodeo when he was four years old, and won numerous prizes in youth competitions. In high school, he finished in first place in the 1965 Texas Youth Rodeo Association finals, and was second in the National High School Rodeo all-around standings, winning the national high school title in the tie-down roping event. Lyne attended Southwest Texas Junior College, using scholarships he earned in rodeo events to pay his tuition. At the 1967 National Intercollegiate Rodeo Association's (NIRA) College National Finals Rodeo (CNFR), he finished in second place in the ribbon roping event. The following year, he was named the individual all-around champion and won the national championship in tie-down roping. In 1969, when he was a student at Sam Houston State University, Lyne again won the NIRA all-around and tie-down roping titles. He turned professional before he could earn enough credits to graduate from Sam Houston State. After joining the RCA in 1969, Lyne was named the circuit's Rookie of the Year, with season earnings of $12,500. In his second season on the RCA, 1970, Lyne ended the year in third place in the all-around cowboy standings.

In 1971, Lyne earned prize money in every discipline. Larry Mahan, the five-time defending all-around world champion cowboy, suffered a broken leg during the bareback bronc riding event at the September Ellensburg Rodeo, eliminating him from title contention. Lyne maintained a busy schedule; by November, prior to the final event of the season, the NFR, he took part in 112 rodeos, in some weeks entering 3–4 competitions. Going into the NFR, he held a $2,177 lead in season earnings over the second-place cowboy, Bob Berger. Despite competing in one fewer NFR event than Berger, Lyne retained his advantage (aided by Berger suffering multiple injuries from being thrown off of bulls). Lyne set an NFR record by roping a calf in 8.5 seconds. He earned the all-around cowboy world championship for 1971, as well as the tie-down roping world championship. Lyne said in a Sports Illustrated article that he planned to "stick with this a couple, three years and then go back to ranching."

Lyne again contended for the all-around cowboy world championship at the NFR in 1972; his primary competitor was Mahan. The pair's efforts to win the title were documented in the film The Great American Cowboy, which won the Academy Award for Best Documentary Feature. In 1972, Lyne entered 126 rodeos; The New York Times estimated that "he [had] flown commercially almost as much as Henry Kissinger has. By the NFR, Lyne had wrapped up his second consecutive all-around cowboy and tie-down roping world championships. He won $60,852 in total prize money, setting an RCA single-season record. He was the all-around average earnings leader at the NFR, and led in average earnings in tie-down roping and bull riding. As of 2019, he was one of three cowboys (along with Ace Berry and Don McLaughlin) to win multiple event average titles at an NFR. The bull riding average championship at the NFR helped Lyne finish second in season earnings for that event. After Lyne rode nine of his ten bulls in the finals, he won the title of reserve bull riding champion. One of the bulls Lyne rode at the NFR that year was a two-time hall of fame bull known only by his brand, V-61. Lyne drew the bull in the sixth round and successfully rode him, earning 70 points. Lyne was one of only four bull riders to score a qualified ride off the bull. V-61 was only ridden for the requisite eight-seconds five times in 930 attempts.

After the 1972 season, Lyne retired from rodeo competition, as he decided to raise his daughters on his family's Texas ranch. The ProRodeo Hall of Fame inducted Lyne in 1979, as part of its inaugural class of honorees. That year, Lyne came out of retirement and competed part-time. In 1983 and 1986, Lyne won the steer roping average earnings title at the National Finals Steer Roping (NFSR). He is the first cowboy to finish first in NFR average earnings in three events during his career. Trevor Brazile joined him in 2012. Despite not competing full-time in rodeos, Lyne won the 1990 PRCA steer roping championship.

He considered tie-down roping to be his strongest event, with bull riding his personal favorite. He also participated in saddle bronc riding and steer wrestling during his pro rodeo career, but tried to avoid competing in bareback bronc riding, since he believed that it would hurt his arm and hinder him in tie-down roping. Lyne did not own any horses that he rode in tie-down roping; he used more than 90 different horses in the discipline during one season. Mahan said of Lyne, "he fools you because, without any showmanship, he just plain gets the job done."

== Personal life and death ==
Lyne was married to his wife, Sarah. They lived in Cotulla, Texas, and had two daughters, Amanda and Samantha. Samantha, a former Women's Professional Rodeo Association (WPRA) barrel racer who qualified for the 2014 NFR, is married to two-time Professional Bull Riders (PBR) world champion J.B. Mauney.

Lyne died on August 14, 2026, in Cotulla, Texas, at the age of 79.

== Honors ==
- 1970, 1971, 1972, 1976 Linderman Award
- 1971 Rodeo Hall of Fame of the National Cowboy and Western Heritage Museum
- 1979 ProRodeo Hall of Fame
- 2000 Texas Cowboy Hall of Fame
- 2004 Texas Rodeo Hall of Fame
- 2006 Texas Rodeo Cowboy Hall of Fame
- 2007 Pendleton Round-Up and Happy Canyon Hall of Fame
- 2007 PBR Ring of Honor
- 2011 Texas Trail of Fame
- 2019 PBR Ty Murray Top Hand Award
- 2021 Bull Riding Hall of Fame

== Bibliography ==
- Wrangler NFR Records, History (PDF). Professional Rodeo Cowboys Association. 2019.
- Mahoney, Sylvia Gann (2004). College Rodeo: From Show to Sport. Texas A&M University Press. ISBN 978-1-58544-331-4.
