= The Mailbox (film) =

- Directed by: David K. Jacobs
- Screenplay by: David K. Jacobs
- Story by: Florence Doyle Putt
- Produced by: David K. Jacobs
- Starring: Lethe Tatge; Rachel Jacobs; Rebecca Glade
- Cinematography: Reed Smoot
- Edited by: James W. Dearden
- Music by: Merrill Jenson
- Production company: BYU Motion Picture Studios
- Distributed by: The Church of Jesus Christ of Latter-day Saints
- Release date: 1977
- Running time: 24 minutes
- Country: United States
- Language: English

The Mailbox is a 1977 American 24-minute short film produced by BYU Motion Picture Studios. The film is available through the Brigham Young University Office of Creative Works on a compilation DVD with other LDS films.

== Plot ==
Lethe, a grandmother, goes to the mailbox every day as she hopes her children have sent her a letter. She asks her children to write instead of having short phone calls, but they never send any. One of Lethe's daughters finally sends he a letter, but only to tell her they are putting her in a retirement home. After Lethe gets her letter, she goes to open it but collapses. Before she dies she asks her neighbor to tell her children that she was so happy to finally get a letter.

== Cast ==
- Lethe Tatge as Lethe Anderson
- Rachel Jacobs as Rachel Johnson
- Rebecca Glade as Sharon Johnson
- Alan Nash as Mike the Mailman
- Martha Henstrom as Myra (voice)
- Winkie Horman as Susan (voice)

== Reception ==
Considered as among the best known films produced at BYU, and "It is clear that the tragedy is not in the death, but in the emptiness of the mailbox."

== See also ==
- Chris Conkling
