= Rose Datoc Dall =

Filipina-American painter

- Born: Washington, D.C., United States
- Known for: Painting, Religious art
- Awards: Purchase Award, International Art Competition, Church History Museum
- Website: www.rosedatocdall.com

Rose Datoc Dall (born 1968) is a Filipina-American painter and is known for her contemporary figurative paintings and her religious works.

Dall was born in Washington, D.C., and is a member of the Church of Jesus Christ of Latter-day Saints (LDS Church), joining at age 19. She received a BFA in Art History and Fine Art Studio from Virginia Commonwealth University School of the Arts in 1990. She was the subject of the LDS Church's "I'm a Mormon" ad campaign including a YouTube profile that garnered more than 150,000 views.

== Career ==
Dall held a number of positions in her early career including as Gallery Director for the Alliance for the Varied Arts in Logan, Utah. As her career grew she began to garner commissions, gallery representation, and museum exhibitions. She is known for her religious art that includes depictions of Jesus Christ and early LDS Church historical figures such as Joseph Smith. She is also known for her unique contemporary style and use of bold colors.

Dall is a three-time Purchase Award Winner of the International Art Competition for the LDS Church's Church History Museum (2009, 2015, 2019). Some of her works are part of the permanent collection at the Church History Museum in Salt Lake City, Utah and Southern Virginia University. In 2021, Dall was highlighted by Independent Catholic News on the topic of fasting for her work Fasting in the Wilderness.

== Personal life ==
She married Timothy Dall in the Washington D.C. Temple in 1989 and they have four children. Dall lives in Lehi, Utah.

== Publications ==
- Expressions of Jesus: Cultural Representations of the Savior of the World. Shadow Mountain Publishing. 2025. ISBN 978-1639934584.
