= Take Down (1979 film) =

1979 film by Kieth Merrill

- Directed by: Kieth Merrill
- Written by: Eric Hendershot; Kieth Merrill
- Produced by: Kieth Merrill; David B. Johnston
- Starring: Edward Herrmann; Lorenzo Lamas; Maureen McCormick; Kathleen Lloyd; Maxx Payne; Stephen Furst
- Cinematography: Reed Smoot
- Edited by: Peter Teschner
- Music by: Merrill Jenson
- Production company: American Film Consortium
- Distributed by: Buena Vista Distribution
- Release date: January 1979
- Running time: 107 minutes
- Country: United States
- Language: English
- Budget: $2.5 million
- Box office: $2 million

Take Down is a 1979 American comedy-drama sports film directed by Kieth Merrill and released by Buena Vista Distribution Company. The plot concerns an unqualified teacher who finds himself saddled with coaching duties after a small group of high school seniors form a wrestling team in a last-ditch effort to end a nine-year losing streak against a rival school.

== Plot ==
Ed Branish, a snooty English teacher who finds his situation at Mingo Junction High School far beneath him and barely tolerable, flaunts his air of superiority over all, including his supportive wife, by frequently spouting platitudes from literary masters to validate his often contemptuous viewpoint. Even his wife is starting to show signs of getting fed up with his narcissism.

His habit of having as little to do with his school as possible finally gets the better of him when his light schedule makes him the only staff member available to supervise the newly formed wrestling team. Cornered, he lashes out at the first student to cross his path, Nick Kilvitus, a reserved 185 lbs. senior who's embarrassed by his near-poverty social status and who's also missed a lot of classes lately. No one realizes Nick's been filling in for his alcoholic father at a steel mill hauling I-beams when his dad's too drunk or hung over to show up, which is all too often. Nick is kept busy at night fishing his embittered father out of bars and carried home across town, since they don't have a working car.

Nick hopes he can make up the missed school work in Ed's class to graduate in Spring but instead gets a tongue-lashing on how he should be held back as an example of the consequences of laziness and irresponsibility. In turn, Nick calls Ed an "egotistical snob", telling him that he is more interested in proving how book smart he is instead of teaching and that he is clueless when it comes to the real world and its everyday problems. Fortunately, because of the wrestling team, both will cross paths again and discover they each have much more to them than what they previously knew.

== Cast ==
- Edward Herrmann as Ed Branish
- Kathleen Lloyd as Jill Branish
- Lorenzo Lamas as Nick Kilvitus
- Maureen McCormick as Brooke Cooper
- Maxx Payne as Ted Yacabobich
- Stephen Furst as Randy Jensen
- Toney Smith as Chauncey Washington
- Salvador Feliciano as Tom Palumbo
- Boyd Silversmith as Jack Gross
- Nicolas Beauvy as Jimmy Kier
- Kevin Hooks as Jasper MacGrudder
- Scott Burgi as Robert Stankovich
- Lynn Baird as "Doc" Talada
- Ron Bartholomew as Warren Overpeck
- Vincent Roberts as Bobby Cooper
- David M. Thorne as Hood #2
- Ray Perry as The Masked Wrestler

== Production ==
Take Down was filmed primarily at the old American Fork High School in Utah, prior to the school's demolition and rebuilding. Scenes at other schools include a wrestling match shot at Murray High School in Murray, Utah. It was also filmed in Orem, Utah.

The movie was the first film produced by the American Film Consortium and had a budget of $2 million. Buena Vista Distribution Company acquired it for distribution, their first non-Disney release since Don't Look Now... We're Being Shot At! in 1969. This was the first film with a PG rating released by Disney, five years before they launched Touchstone Pictures to expand into the "adult" market.

== Release ==
Take Down was initially released January 1979 in the Salt Lake City area by American Film. Disney then bought the film rights and released it March 2, 1979 in Northern and Southern California, the Carolinas and the Midwest and grossed $2 million, which was not in line with Disney's expectations. Taft International Pictures later acquired the film.

=== Home media ===
The film was released on VHS by Unicorn Video in the 1980s.
