= Ortho R. Fairbanks =

American sculptor (1925–2015)

Ortho Rollin Fairbanks (April 25, 1925 – June 2, 2015) was one of many members of the Fairbanks family who have been prominent artists.

Fairbanks was the grandson of painter John B Fairbanks, the nephew of sculptor Avard Tennyson Fairbanks, and the nephew of sculptor-painter John Leo Fairbanks. He was born in Salt Lake City and received a Bachelor of Fine Arts from the University of Utah (U of U) in 1952, while taking classes from his Uncle Avard. He received a Master of Fine Arts in 1953 also from the U of U. He married Myrna on February 18, 1949, right before he left on a mission for the Church of Jesus Christ of Latter-day Saints (LDS Church) to New Zealand. From 1960 to 1968, Fairbanks was a professor at the Church College of Hawaii. He contributed carvings to some of the works by Avard Fairbanks. He also taught at the Northland Pioneer College.

In 1965, Fairbanks was in Italy doing a study of sculpture and was able to obtain a copy of Vincenzo Di Francesca's unique conversion story to the LDS Church. He then gave the story to the Improvement Era, which was the first to print it. It was later adapted by the LDS Church into the film How Rare a Possession.

Fairbanks sculpted a monument to John Morgan and his commercial college, one of the first business schools in Utah. He has also made a sculpture to remember young children who die.

The statue of Karl G. Maeser on the Brigham Young University (BYU) campus is by Fairbanks. His busts of Brigham Young, David O. McKay, and Ezra Taft Benson are on display in the LDS Church's Conference Center. He has also made sculptures of Hyrum Smith, Orson Pratt, and Philo T. Farnsworth.

Fairbanks sculpted a bust of Joseph Smith, founder of the Latter Day Saint movement, when he was studying in Italy. He had access to Smith's death mask for facial details. A copy is owned by the Church History Museum in Salt Lake City, Utah, with another copy on display in BYU's Harold B. Lee Library.
