= Erik Orton =

American dramatist

- Born: Erik Orton; 1978 (age 47–48); California U.S.A.
- Occupations: Composer; Lyricist; Playwright; Theatrical producer

Erik Orton (born in 1974 in California) is a New York-based writer and theatre producer. His father was an Air Force officer and his mother a Finnish immigrant. He was raised primarily in West Germany and the suburbs of Washington D.C. He graduated from Brigham Young University in 1998 with a degree in Media Music. He and his wife, Emily Orton, have five children together.

Orton's original musical, Berlin, was performed Off-Off-Broadway in 2003. In 2005, he produced the Off-Broadway musical, The Ark (written by BYU professor Kevin Kelly and LDS composer Michael McLean). He is currently producing Children of Eden for Broadway (Music & Lyrics by Stephen Schwartz, Book by John Caird). Orton also penned The Drummings (in collaboration with Joshua Williams) based on the life and times of Irish statesman Daniel O'Connell.

Orton has worked for a variety of Broadway general management and production offices including Wasser Associates, Richards/Climan Inc. and The Wolf Trap Center for the Performing Arts. Broadway shows and tours he has helped manage include Wicked, The Phantom of the Opera, Les Misérables, and Miss Saigon, among others.

Orton has been featured on the cover of Crain's Business New York as well as The New York Times and theatre industry news hub Playbill.com.

In 2007, Orton's Berlin was performed at the Longwharf Theatre in New Haven and then again in 2008 at Brigham Young University's mainstage season. He is represented by Susan Gurman of the Gurman Agency.

Berlin was made into a film by BYU and shown on BYU-TV in 2008. In 2009 Berlin was shown at the LDS Film Festival in Orem, Utah. Berlin won an Emmy Award in 2009.

Orton is a Latter-day Saint. He co-wrote the book for Savior of the World, one of a total of 7 artistic creators. He was the artistic director of Standard to the Nations the LDS Cultural production staged before the dedication of the Manhattan Temple.

Orton co-wrote a book with his wife Emily called Seven at Sea. The book details the year he and his family of 5 children spent living on a sailboat.
