= Mystic India =

- Mystic India poster
- Directed by: Keith Melton
- Written by: Mose Richards
- Produced by: BAPS Charities
- Starring: Latesh Patel; Rupak Mehta
- Narrated by: Peter O'Toole
- Cinematography: Reed Smoot
- Edited by: AKS Media Network
- Music by: Sam Cardon, Pandit Ronu Majumdar
- Distributed by: Giant Screen Films
- Release date: 2004
- Running time: 40 min.
- Country: India
- Languages: Hindi; English

Mystic India is a 2004 large format film (commonly known as the IMAX format) about India's culture, people, and traditions. It is told through the 12,000 km barefoot journey throughout 18th century India undertaken by the Hindu adolescent ascetic Nilkanth, later known in life as Swaminarayan by his followers. The film was directed by Keith Melton and financed and produced by BAPS Charities. The film is available in Hindi, English, French, and Spanish.

== Cast ==
- Latesh Patel as young Nilkanth. At His youngest, this is when He sets out on His journey, and during his early experiences during the journey.
- Rupak Mehta as older Nilkanth. Portrayed to represent Him as he gets older during his 7-year journey, as it comes to an end.
- Peter O'Toole as the narrator for the English version of the film, describing and elaborating with each scene that passes.
- Total Cast: Mystic India incorporated 45,000 cast members. The scene of arti being performed at the Akshardham alone had 9,000 cast members in it, while the scene of the Rath Yatra had 8,000 cast members.

== Plot ==
=== Nilkanth’s Journey ===
Nilkanth walked 12,000 kilometers around the Indian subcontinent over a span of 7 years. His journey took him through the "dense jungles, fertile plains, majestic mountains, mighty rivers, and peaceful coastlines" of India. This journey included the exploration of "India’s silent spirituality" and its appropriation as a "mystic land of meditation, contemplation and enlightenment."

=== Leaving Home ===
On 29 June 1792 at the age of 11, Nilkanth left home "to begin his life work of establishing ekantik dharma." Nilkanth took very few possessions with him on his journey. Known articles include a loin cloth, "a rosary, a kerchief, a piece of cloth for filtering water and a small manuscript."

=== In the Himalayas ===
Nilkanth first travelled to the Himalayan Mountains and reached Badrinath during October 1792. Soon thereafter, he reached Nepal and performed austerities by standing on one leg in meditation for four months.

=== At Jagannath Puri ===
"Leaving the Himalayas, Nilkanth went through Bengal to Jagannathpuri in the east." It is here that Nilkanth took part in the Rath Yatra, a festival dedicated to the pulling of Lord Jagannath’s murti on a royal chariot.

=== In South India ===
From Jagannath Puri, Nilkanth traveled to South India. "He visited the sacred places associated with the life of Ramanuja, including his birthplace at Sriperumbudur and the famous pilgrimage temple at Srirangam. Nilkanth’s journey through Kanchipuram, Kumbakonam, Madurai, and Rameshwaram took him to the southern tip of India."

=== In Gujarat ===
On 21 July 1799, Nilkanth’s journey finally ended in the town of Loj, Gujarat. In Loj at the age of 18, Nilkanth met Muktanand Swami, a senior leader of a group of ascetics who followed the Vaishnava teachings of their guru Ramanand Swami.

== Soundtrack ==
The music for the film was a joint effort between Sam Cardon, Ronu Majumdar, and BAPS musicians. Due to this diverse talent pool, the music for Mystic India covers a wide spectrum, ranging from western symphony to Indian traditional music.

== Production ==
The film was shot during two different time periods, March to May 2003 and January to February 2004. The shooting was done at over 100 different locations, some as high as 13,000 feet. The most cinematically appealing scene is during the Rath Yatra festival in Jagannathpuri. The shot included chariots over five stories tall and over 8,000 participants.

== Reception ==
=== Critical reception ===
According to movie review website Rotten Tomatoes, Mystic India received an overall critic approval rating of 86%. Top critic Roger Moore of the Orlando Sentinel said that the film "utterly fills the screen with wondrous images of a place that few will ever have the chance to explore". Top critic Philip Wuntch of the Dallas Morning News said "the film celebrates India’s diversity and makes a strong and moving plea for unity among the peoples of the world".

=== Awards ===
Mystic India received the Audience’s Choice Award at the 10th International Large Format Film Festival at La Geode in Paris, France. The festival lasted from 12 to 31 January in 2005. Mystic India was one of nine large format films selected to be screened at the festival. Mystic India was also accredited with the honor of "Most Popular Film" at the San Jose IMAX Film Festival.
