= Amazon (1997 film) =

1997 film

- Film poster
- Directed by: Kieth Merrill
- Written by: Kieth Merrill; Loren McIntyre
- Produced by: Kieth Merrill; Isaac Palmer; Jonathan Stern
- Narrated by: Linda Hunt
- Cinematography: Mike Hoover
- Edited by: Stephen L. Johnson
- Music by: Alan Williams
- Distributed by: MacGillivray Freeman Films
- Release date: 1997
- Running time: 38 minutes
- Country: United States
- Language: English

Amazon is a 1997 American short documentary film directed by Kieth Merrill. It was nominated for an Academy Award for Best Documentary Short.

== Summary ==
The film features ethnobiologist Mark Plotkin, who discusses the role of rainforest conservation and the benefits of investigating it further in the interest of medical and scientific knowledge.
