= The Mountain of the Lord =

- Directed by: Peter N. Johnson
- Produced by: Nicholas J. Gasdik
- Starring: Cory Dangerfield; Scot Silver; John Phillip Law; Michael Audley
- Cinematography: Reed Smoot
- Edited by: Peter G. Czerny
- Music by: Arlen Card
- Distributed by: The Church of Jesus Christ of Latter-day Saints
- Release date: 1993
- Running time: 72 minutes
- Country: United States
- Language: English
- Budget: $3,000,000

The Mountain of the Lord is a 72-minute film produced by the Church of Jesus Christ of Latter-day Saints. It depicts the story of the building of the Salt Lake Temple in a fictional encounter between a reporter and Wilford Woodruff and was produced for the centennial of its dedication. The film shows the struggles of early Mormons to build the temple—which took 40 years to complete—in the Salt Lake Valley, where church members arrived in 1847.

The film was shown in connection with the April 1993 General Conference.

== Production ==
Parts of the film were shot in Provo, Utah.
