= Stephen B. Allen =

American filmmaker

Stephen Brown Allen
- Born: January 12, 1950 (age 76); Salt Lake City, Utah, U.S.
- Education: Brigham Young University
- Occupations: Managing Director, Missionary Department, The Church of Jesus Christ of Latter-day Saints
- Known for: His work developing new methods of missionary work using technology, traditional and new media, improved teaching methodologies and other creative means.
- Spouse: Nancy Billings
- Children: 6

Stephen Brown Allen (born January 12, 1950) is a maker of Latter-day Saint religious and proselytizing films.

Allen was born in Salt Lake City, Utah, to Arthur Tranter and Virginia Brown Allen. His mother died from complications related to childbirth and his father subsequently married June Fowler Allen. His father was involved in the Church of Jesus Christ of Latter-day Saints (LDS Church) building program. On assignments, his family moved to various parts of the world. Allen spent four years of his childhood in Australia and New Zealand. At the age of twelve his family moved to Montevideo, Uruguay, where he later graduated from high school.

Allen served as a missionary in the church's Guatemala–El Salvador Mission from 1969 to 1971. He then attended Brigham Young University where he graduated with a major in Communications—Television Production and a minor in Advertising and Public Relations.

He married Nancy Billings on January 28, 1972, in the Salt Lake Temple. They have six children—four boys and two girls. The Allens now have 25 grandchildren.

Allen served as president of the church's Arizona Tempe Mission from 1993 to 1995. He has served as a bishop twice, counselor in a stake presidency, and stake president.

Prior to his call as a mission president, Allen was the director of Media and Public Programs in the church's Missionary Department. He was responsible for the production and distribution of radio, television, and print media directed to nonmembers as well as the church's pageants, visitors' centers, and historic sites. Earlier in his career, Allen was the executive producer of the LDS Church's Homefront radio and television commercials and many other church films, including Mr. Krueger's Christmas (1980) and The Last Leaf (1983).

Following his service as a mission president in Arizona, Allen served as managing director of the church's Missionary Department for 18 years until he retired in February 2017. Concurrent with his service in the church's Missionary Department, Allen served from 2011 to 2016 as an area seventy in the Fifth Quorum of Seventy, assigned to the Utah Salt Lake City Area. From 2018 to 2020, Allen served as director of the Laie Hawaii Temple Visitors' Center.

== Key projects ==
=== Ad campaigns ===
- Emmy Award-Winning Homefront PSAs, I'm a Mormon

=== Films ===
- Mr. Krueger's Christmas (1980)
- The Last Leaf (1983)
- Man's Search for Happiness (1987 Remake)
- The Nativity: Luke II (1986)
- Together Forever (1987)
