= Kieth Merrill =

American filmmaker (born 1940)

Kieth W. Merrill
- Born: May 22, 1940 (age 86); Farmington, Utah, U.S.
- Education: Bachelor of Arts
- Alma mater: Brigham Young University
- Occupation: Filmmaker
- Writing career
- Years active: 1973–present
- Genres: Christianity; documentaries; fantasy; general fiction; historical fiction
- Notable works: The Great American Cowboy (1973); The Wild West (1993); Amazon (1997); Various films for the Church of Jesus Christ of Latter-day Saints
- Notable awards: Academy Award for Best Documentary Feature Film (1973)

Kieth W. Merrill (born May 22, 1940) is an American filmmaker who has worked as a writer, director, and producer in the film industry since 1967. He is a member of the Academy of Motion Picture Arts and Sciences and the Directors Guild of America, and received an Academy Award for The Great American Cowboy (1973) and a nomination for Amazon (1997). He is also known for directing The Testaments of One Fold and One Shepherd, Legacy and Windwalker.

He published a novel, The Evolution of Thomas Hall, through Shadow Mountain in 2011. His first fantasy novel, The Immortal Crown, was published by Shadow Mountain in 2016.

== Biography ==
The son of artist/landscape architect David Merrill and playwright/actress Leola Green Merrill, Kieth Merrill was born and raised in Farmington, Utah, a small, pioneer-founded town 20 miles north of Salt Lake City.

As an active member of the Church of Jesus Christ of Latter-day Saints, he served as a missionary for the church in Denmark for two-and-a-half years.

Merrill graduated in 1967 with a bachelor's degree from Brigham Young University (BYU). He is married to Dagny Johnson, and they are the parents of eight children. They reside in Northern California. Merrill was commissioned by the LDS Church's First Presidency to produce the films Legacy and The Testaments for the state-of-the-art 70 mm Legacy Theater at Temple Square in Salt Lake City.

Merrill has been a member of the Board of Trustees of Southern Virginia University and president of the BYU Alumni Association. He received the Franklin S. Harris Fine Arts Award from BYU when he delivered the commencement address to the BYU College of Fine Arts and Communications in 2007.

In 2021, his refusal to watch Never Rarely Sometimes Always for Academy Awards consideration as a voting member garnered some attention.

== Filmography ==
Merrill has done work in various formats, including IMAX and 70mm. He has created feature films, documentaries, television commercials, and miniseries.

- The Great American Cowboy (1973 Documentary Academy Award Winner)
- A Matter of Winning (1973)
- Great American Indian (1976)
- Three Warriors (1977)
- Take Down (1979)
- Kenny Rogers and the American Cowboy (1979)
- Windwalker (1980)
- Mr. Krueger's Christmas (1980)
- Wheels of Fire (1981)
- Harry's War (1981)
- Rivals (1981)
- The Cherokee Trail (1981)
- Grand Canyon: The Hidden Secrets (1984, IMAX)
- Niagara: Miracles, Myths and Magic (1986, IMAX)
- Alamo: The Price of Freedom (1988)
- Legacy (1990)
- Polynesian Odyssey (1991, IMAX)
- On The Way Home (1992)
- The Wild West (1993, TV miniseries, Emmy nomination)
- Yellowstone (1994, IMAX)
- Passion for Life (1995, IMAX)
- Ozarks: Legacy and Legends (1995, IMAX)
- San Francisco: The Movie (1995, IMAX)
- Zion Canyon: Treasure of the Gods (1996, IMAX)
- Amazon (1997, IMAX, nominated for Academy Award)
- The Witness (1997, IMAX)
- Olympic Glory (1999, IMAX)
- The Testaments (2000)
- The 12 Dogs of Christmas (2005)
- The 12 Dogs of Christmas – Great Puppy Rescue (2012)

== Bibliography ==
- The Evolution of Thomas Hall (May 2011, ISBN 9781606418369, Shadow Mountain)
- Saga of Kings series
  - The Immortal Crown (May 2016, ISBN 978-1-62972-025-8, Shadow Mountain)
