= Mr. Krueger's Christmas =

- Written by: E.F. Wallengren
- Story by: Michael H. McLean; Allan Henderson; J. Scott Iverson
- Directed by: Kieth Merrill
- Starring: James Stewart
- Narrated by: Gordon Jump
- Music by: William J. Evans
- Country of origin: United States
- Original language: English

Production
- Executive producers: John G. Kinnear; Stephen B. Allen
- Producer: Michael H. McLean
- Cinematography: Jeremy Lepard
- Editor: Stephen Johnson
- Running time: 26 minutes
- Production company: Bonneville Productions

Original release
- Network: NBC
- Release: December 21, 1980

Mr. Krueger's Christmas is a 1980 American Christmas short television film produced by the Church of Jesus Christ of Latter-day Saints, starring James Stewart, directed by Kieth Merrill, with story by Michael H. McLean, and featuring the Tabernacle Choir at Temple Square. It was first broadcast on NBC on December 21, 1980.

== Synopsis ==
Willy Krueger is a widowed apartment janitor who lives in a basement flat with his cat George. On a cold Christmas Eve, he daydreams to escape his lonely life: he muses about being a man of culture and means, an ice dance at Temple Square, a sleigh ride, as well as the conductor of the Tabernacle Choir at Temple Square, and also imagines himself in the stable with Mary, Joseph and the infant Jesus.

== Cast ==
- James Stewart as Willy Krueger
- Beverly Rowland as Lead Caroller
- Kamee Aliessa as Clarissa
- Tamara Fowler as Clarissa's mother
- Tyson Lewis as Baby Jesus
- Gordon Jump as Narrator

== Production ==
Parts of the special were shot in Salt Lake City, Utah.

== See also ==
- List of Christmas films
