= Legacy: A Mormon Journey =

- DVD Cover
- Directed by: Kieth Merrill
- Written by: Kieth Merrill
- Produced by: Scott Swofford
- Starring: Kathleen Beller; Marcus Gilbert
- Cinematography: Reed Smoot
- Edited by: Kathleen Korth
- Music by: Merrill Jenson
- Distributed by: The Church of Jesus Christ of Latter-day Saints
- Release date: July 3, 1993 (Salt Lake City)
- Running time: 53 min
- Country: United States
- Language: English

Legacy: A Mormon Journey is a 53-minute film produced by the Church of Jesus Christ of Latter-day Saints. Legacy depicts the life of two recent converts from the 1830s to the 1890s. The characters are fictional, though the events they experience are historical.

The film was initially produced to be shown in the Legacy Theatre of the Joseph Smith Memorial Building (JSMB), following the building's complete remodel. After the building's reopening, Legacy premiered on July 3, 1993. In addition to screenings in the JSMB adjacent to Temple Square in Salt Lake City, Utah, it was shown at the visitors' centers at the church's Washington, D.C., and Mesa Arizona temples. It was replaced in March 2000 by The Testaments of One Fold and One Shepherd.

== Production ==
Parts of the film were shot in Salt Lake City as well as New York, Wyoming, and Nauvoo, Illinois. A popular but unconfirmed rumor states that the scene 41 minutes in when Eliza's wagon slips in the mud was not staged. The rain was unexpected and the crew continued filming as the wagon actually slipped off the road. Marcus Gilbert as David Walker pulled Kathleen Beller as Eliza Williams to safety. Additionally, the actor playing Eliza's father broke his leg trying to control the horses. He can be seen limping throughout the remainder of the film.

== Cast ==
- Kathleen Beller as Eliza Williams
- Benton Jennings as Governor Boggs
- Steve Abolt as Missouri Militia Officer
- Marcus Gilbert as David Walker
- J.T. Gorham as Young Rider
- Brian Lives as Missionary
- Will Schmitz Jr. as Wilford Woodruff
