= Michael McLean (songwriter) =

- Born: Michael H. McLean; 1952 (age 73–74); United States
- Genres: Mormon pop, religious
- Occupations: Songwriter, author, playwright, filmmaker
- Years active: 1980–present
- Label: Shadow Mountain
- Spouse: Lynne McLean
- Website: michaelmcleanmusic.com

Michael H. McLean (born 1952) is an American songwriter, playwright, author, and filmmaker based in Heber City, Utah.

== Early life ==
McLean attended high school in the Chicago area, where he served as student body president and performed in the school's production of The Music Man. He is a member of the Church of Jesus Christ of Latter-day Saints (LDS Church) and was the only Latter-day Saint in his graduating class.

McLean served an LDS mission in South Africa. After returning from his mission he formed a band. They went around at the bottom of the club circuit, but never made a break. While a student at Brigham Young University (BYU) he took a music theory class in which he received a C and was told that he did not have what it would take to make it in music professionally.

After this McLean went to the University of Utah. He took a weekly composition class with Merrill Bradshaw. He made some professional progress writing music for local commercials in Salt Lake City.

McLean finally quit college after his wife, Lynne, was in an auto accident. His first significant professional break through came from writing commercials for the LDS Church's "Homefront" campaign. He took a job as producer for the Mormon Tabernacle Choir in 1976. McLean would work with the Choir until 1993.

In late 2021 McLean was diagnosed with stage-five renal failure after a dangerous bout of COVID-19. His life was saved by a kidney donor from Heber Valley Utah.

== Career ==
As a composer, McLean has produced more than 20 albums of original music, selling over one million copies since his 1983 debut. Focused mainly on a Latter-day Saint audience, McLean has also produced albums with a broader appeal, such as The Forgotten Carols. McLean's most recent musical releases have been through Shadow Mountain Records, with The Forgotten Carols on a separate Deseret Book label.

In 1986, McLean began work on a musical called The Ark, in collaboration with BYU professor Kevin Kelly, which originally debuted at the Plum Alley Theatre. In 2000, the musical participated in the Festivals of New Musicals in New York City. The play was later produced off-Broadway in New York City by Erik Orton, with the first performance in November 2005.

In the early 1980s, McLean convinced James Stewart to work with him at a reduced rate in a made-for-TV film entitled Mr. Krueger's Christmas.

== Discography ==
- You're Not Alone (1983)
- Stay With Me (1984)
- Celebrating the Light (1985)
- A New Kind of Love Song (1988)
- One Heart in the Right Place (1990)
- The Forgotten Carols (original, 1991)
- You've Always Been There For Me (1992)
- Distant Serenade (1993)
- The Collection, Volume 1 (1994)
- Soundtracks (1994)
- The Garden (1995)
- Our Unspoken Song (1995)
- Celebrating the Light Soundtrack (1995)
- The Collection, Vol. 2 (1997)
- Father and Son (1997)
- The Ark (1998)
- Safe Harbors (1999)
- Michael Sings McLean (2000)
- Connie Lou's Christmas (2000)
- Arise and Shine Forth (2000)
- The Forgotten Carols: Anniversary Edition (10th, 2001)
- Something's Changed (2002)
- The Best Two Years (2004)
- As I Am (2005)
- The Other Side of Down (2008)
- Hope Hiding (2008)
- It's Not Love 'Til It's Been Through a Storm (2008)
- See Us Shine (2008)
- Tender Mercies (2008)
- The Forgotten Carols: Anniversary Cast Recording (20th, 2011)
- Threads (2013)
- Encountering Jesus (2015)

== Memoir ==
- Hold On, The Light Will Come: And Other Lessons My Songs Have Taught Me (2003)
