= How Rare a Possession =

- Directed by: Russell D. Holt
- Written by: Russell D. Holt
- Produced by: Peter N. Johnson
- Starring: Mark Deakins; Bruce Newbold; Marvin Payne; Scott Silkinson; Joe De Santis
- Music by: Merrill Jenson
- Distributed by: The Church of Jesus Christ of Latter-day Saints
- Release date: 1987
- Running time: 64 minutes
- Country: United States
- Language: English

How Rare a Possession is a 64-minute film produced by the Church of Jesus Christ of Latter-day Saints (LDS Church). It depicts the conversion stories of Parley P. Pratt, a church leader in the 19th century, and Vincenzo di Francesca, an Italian pastor in the 20th century, who both join the church after studying the Book of Mormon. It also shows several key scenes from the Book of Mormon.

In October 2017, it was reported that the LDS Church had acquired the handwritten testimony of Di Francesca, penned in 1966.

== See also ==
- The Church of Jesus Christ of Latter-day Saints in Italy
