= Joseph Smith Memorial Building =

Building in Salt Lake City, Utah, U.S.

- Hotel Utah
- U.S. National Register of Historic Places
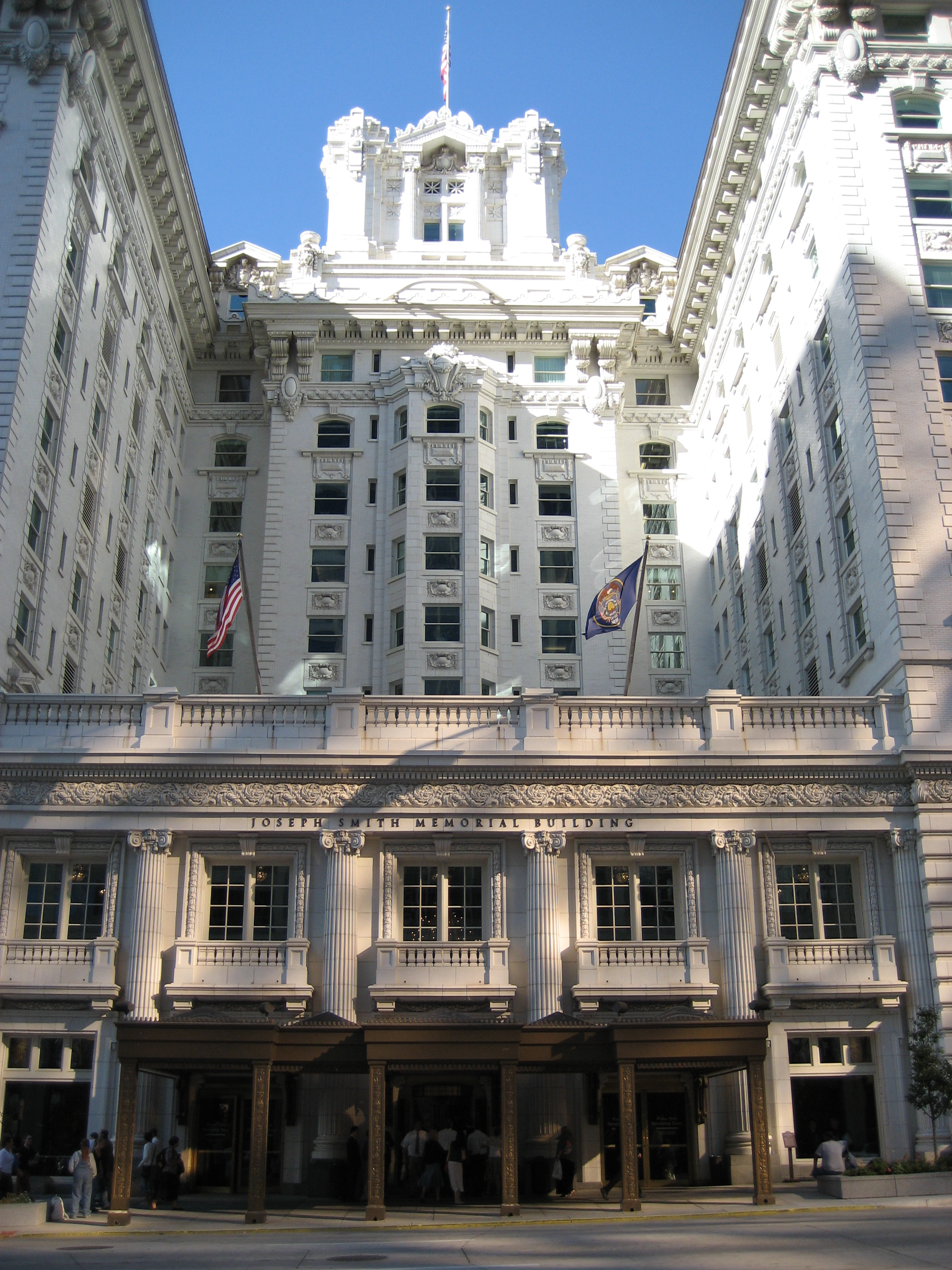
- View from the South.

- Location within Utah Location within the United States
- Location: South Temple and Main Streets, Salt Lake City, Utah, U.S.
- Coordinates: 40°46′11″N 111°53′26″W
- Area: 1 acre (0.40 ha)
- Built: 1909–1911 (major remodeling and adaptive-reuse project completed in 1993)
- Architect: Parkinson & Bergstrom
- Architectural style: Classical Revival, Modern Italian Renaissance
- NRHP reference No.: 78002673
- Added to NRHP: January 3, 1978 (48 years ago)

The Joseph Smith Memorial Building (JSMB), originally called the Hotel Utah, is a social center located on the corner of Main Street and South Temple in Salt Lake City. It is named in honor of Joseph Smith, founder of the Latter Day Saint movement.

It previously housed several restaurants and also functioned as a venue for events, although it was closed in 2023 for extensive renovations, expected to be completed in 2025. Several levels of the building have also been administrative offices for departments of the Church of Jesus Christ of Latter-day Saints (LDS Church), such as FamilySearch.

On January 3, 1978, it was added to the National Register of Historic Places as the Hotel Utah.

== History ==
=== Hotel ===
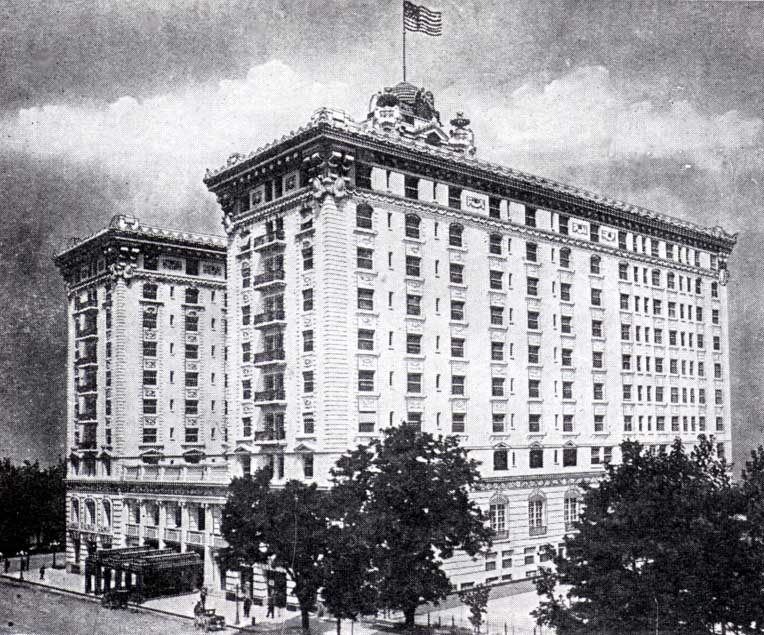
Hotel Utah, 1925.

The corner of Main Street and South Temple has long been important in Utah history. Prior to construction of the Hotel Utah from 1909 to 1911, the general tithing office of the LDS Church, a bishop's storehouse, and the Deseret News printing plant all were located on the site.

Work on the Second Renaissance Revival style hotel, designed by the Los Angeles architectural firm of Parkinson and Bergstrom, began in June 1909. Two years later, on June 9, 1911, the Hotel Utah opened for business. While the LDS Church was the primary stockholder, many community and business leaders, both church members and those who were not, purchased stock in the effort to provide the city with a first-class hotel.

"The largest and finest bar in the West [was built] in the basement of the Hotel" to pay off a $2 million construction loan. The financing was secured by the LDS Church's presiding bishop, Charles W. Nibley, from New York financier Charles Baruch.

Lobby circa 1920s

Originally, the hotel allowed black employees, but no black guests. This policy extended to famous black entertainers, including Lillian Evanti, Harry Belafonte, Marian Anderson, and Ella Fitzgerald were all denied hotel rooms. Anderson was eventually allowed to stay at the Hotel, on condition that she did not use the elevator and eat her meals in her hotel room.

In 1947, the first non-white professional basketball player, Wataru Misaka, signed his first National Basketball Association contract at this hotel. At the time of his signing, according to Misaka, nonwhites were not allowed to stay in this hotel.

The ten-story building has a concrete and steel structure and is covered with white glazed terra cotta and brick. Various additions and remodelings have occurred throughout the years, including a substantial expansion to the north and modifications to the roof-top dining facilities.

It was featured in the 1973 comedy-drama film Harry in Your Pocket, starring James Coburn.

=== Office building and reception center ===
The building ceased operations as a hotel in August 1987. A major remodeling and adaptive-reuse project to accommodate both community and church functions was completed in 1993. Church leader Gordon B. Hinckley chose the name when he observed that there were many monuments to pioneer leader and Utah founder Brigham Young, but none to Joseph Smith.

The building was decorated with the words "SALT LAKE 2002" during the Winter Olympics.

2011 marked the celebration of 100 years since initial construction was completed on the Hotel Utah.

The church's top leadership, known as general authorities, hold a weekly meeting in the nearby Salt Lake Temple. During the 2020s, when the temple was closed due to a large-scale renovation project, the eighth floor of the Joseph Smith Memorial Building underwent an estimated $2,000,000 remodel, after which it was dedicated as a sacred meeting space for leadership while the temple remained under renovation.

== Features ==
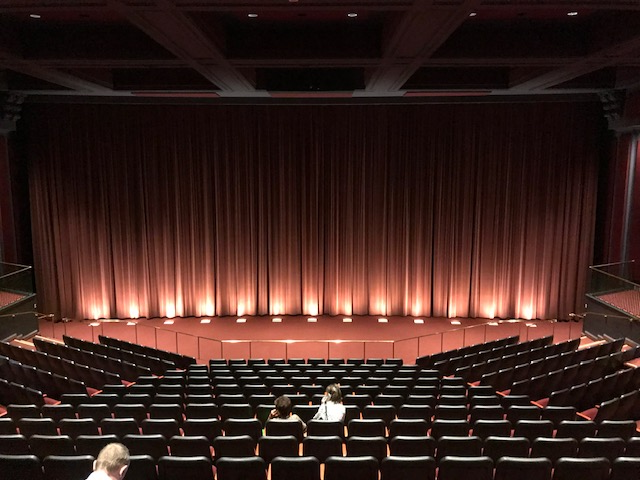
Legacy Theater in the Joseph Smith Memorial Building

The Testaments of One Fold and One Shepherd is a 67-minute film shot in 65 mm and produced by the LDS Church. It depicts the life of Jesus in Jerusalem correlated to the events described in the Book of Mormon from approximately the same time period. The film's climax occurs after Christ's resurrection, when Jesus appears in the Americas. The movie was originally shown in the Legacy Theater on a 62x31 foot screen. It replaced Legacy: A Mormon Journey as the flagship JSMB feature in March 2000. The Testaments of One Fold and One Shepherd was later replaced in the theater by Joseph Smith: The Prophet of the Restoration, a film commemorating the 200th anniversary of Smith's birth.

== Use post-hotel ==
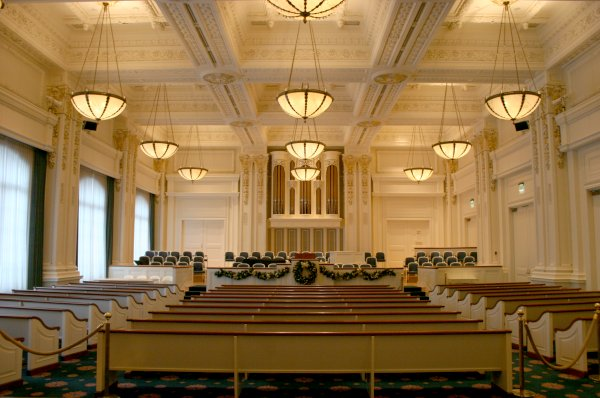
The chapel in the Joseph Smith Memorial Building.

The building hosts:

- A large, historical, ornately decorated multi-story lobby, featuring a large white statue of Joseph Smith, and an enormous crystal chandelier. Live classical music is often performed here as background.
- A FamilySearch center, where the public can use the provided computers and materials to do family history research and genealogy.
- The Legacy Theater, where the public can view regularly scheduled free showings of various church-produced movies. The theater originally showed Legacy: A Mormon Journey and subsequently has also shown The Testaments of One Fold and One Shepherd, Joseph Smith: Prophet of the Restoration, and Meet the Mormons.
- Two restaurants, The Garden Restaurant on the ground floor and The Roof Restaurant on the top (tenth) floor.
- There is a chapel used for the Sunday services of local wards. The chapel contains a Casavant Frères pipe organ with 2,484 pipes in 45 ranks across two manuals. The organ is characterized by a French accent.
- A pair of peregrine falcons returns yearly to nest in a nest box at the top of the building, which has two webcams installed in it, viewable to the public.

Preceded by Boston Building	Tallest building in Salt Lake City; 1911–1912; 56 m	Succeeded by Walker Center
