= Joseph Smith: The Prophet of the Restoration =

- Directed by: T. C. Christensen; Gary Cook
- Written by: Gary Cook
- Produced by: Ron Munns
- Starring: Nathan Mitchell; Dustin Harding; Tayva Patch; Rick Macy
- Cinematography: T. C. Christensen
- Edited by: Wynn Hougaard
- Music by: Merrill Jenson
- Distributed by: The Church of Jesus Christ of Latter-day Saints
- Release date: December 2005
- Running time: 60 minutes
- Language: English

Joseph Smith: The Prophet of the Restoration is a 2005 American biographical historical drama film that focuses on some of the events during the life of Joseph Smith, founder of the Latter Day Saint movement, which was both filmed and distributed by the Church of Jesus Christ of Latter-day Saints (LDS Church). The film was shown in the Legacy Theater of the Joseph Smith Memorial Building from its opening on December 17, 2005 until early 2015, and opened in several LDS Church visitors' centers on December 24, 2005.

The film used the digital intermediate process. In March 2011, the LDS Church released a revised cut of the film, which is available to watch in select visitors' centers and online. Additionally, the church has released the film in several languages including ASL, Spanish, French, German, and Japanese. The film is available for free on YouTube, on the church's official channel.

== Plot ==
In a prologue, Mary, a recent Mormon convert, has traveled over 4,000 miles to Nauvoo, Illinois, with her father to meet Joseph Smith. Her father asks if she intends to find out whether Smith is a prophet of God. Mary responds that she already knows he is, and that her father can know too by reading what he wrote. Mary's father begins to read an issue of Times and Seasons and the Book of Mormon.

In 1813, young Joseph Smith suffers a severe injury and subsequent infection to his left leg. He undergoes an experimental operation to remove the infected parts of the bone, thus avoiding the need for amputation.

In the spring of 1820, Smith receives his First Vision of God and Jesus Christ, in which he is told not to join any existing churches, as he will be called to start his own. Three years later, the angel Moroni tells him where to find the golden plates which will form the holy scriptures of this new church. Shortly thereafter, Joseph's eldest brother, Alvin, dies.

Smith meets and marries Emma Hale, against the objections of her parents. A few years later, Smith retrieves and translates the golden plates. During one session of translation, Smith and his scribe, Oliver Cowdery, pray to learn more about a particular doctrine. They receive a visitation from John the Baptist, who confers upon them the authority to baptize. Next is a visitation of Peter, James and John, who confer upon them the authority to organize the Church of Christ, which they do in April 1830. The nascent church suffers persecution and harassment, forcing a move to Kirtland, Ohio in 1836. While in Kirtland, Smith reveals that God wants them to build a temple. After it is finished and a meeting has been held, Smith and Cowdery see another vision where God accepts the temple. Other personages then appear and confer additional priesthood keys or authorities on them. Smith calls several men to travel and preach the gospel to the British Isles for the first time. During this time, Mary meets the missionaries and joins the church.

Despite the success of the finished temple and visions, Smith and many others are forced to move several more times to escape persecution, eventually ending up in Nauvoo, Illinois, where they build another temple. Joseph Smith and his brother, Hyrum, discover their old enemies are trying to get them to Carthage, Illinois to kill them. Joseph decides to confront them directly, telling Hyrum that if they go, they will not come back. Smith transfers his authority to the church's apostles, including Brigham Young.

On June 24, 1844, Smith, Hyrum, and two other men, John Taylor and Willard Richards, mount their horses and ride through the streets on the way out of town. Meanwhile, Mary and her father, who have just arrived in Nauvoo, attempt to follow the riders so that they can meet Smith, but give up when the riders pass out of town.

The Smith brothers report to the jail in Carthage, as requested, when men with guns later force their way into the jail and kill them. The film ends with Smith's words from the Doctrine and Covenants: "Shall we not go on in so great a cause?"

== Release ==
The Deseret News reported in 2005 that production on the film "was rushed" in order to meet the church's 2005 bicentennial of Smith's birthday.

The film has been shown at a number of the church's visitors' center locations, including at the Mesa Arizona, Laie Hawaii, Idaho Falls Idaho, Los Angeles California, Hamilton New Zealand, Oakland California, St. George Utah, Washington D.C., and London England temples, along with the historic Kirtland, Historic Nauvoo, Hill Cumorah, and Independence Missouri centers. It has also been shown at the Cove Fort, Liberty Jail and San Diego Mormon Battalion historic sites, along with the Joseph Smith Birthplace Memorial, and the Mormon Trail Center at Historic Winter Quarters.

=== DVD ===
The original film was released on DVD through the church's Distribution Services on October 1, 2010, as part of the DVD set "Doctrine and Covenants and Church History Visual Resource DVDs".

=== 2011 revision ===
In March 2011, the church released a new version of the film. The revised cut is expected to help those unfamiliar with Smith's story understand it better than the original did. The revisions to the film included a new narration given by Smith's mother, Lucy Mack Smith, while 40 percent of the film is new content, and it is also five minutes shorter than the original. Because of the level of new content added, some new filming was required. The revised film is available online, on the church's YouTube channel—Mormon Messages—and is available for download on their radio service website, the Mormon Channel. The revised film was shown in the Legacy Theater. and at select church visitors' centers through early 2015. There are no plans to release the revised edition on DVD since it is available to download.
