= List of Brigham Young University alumni =

Notable BYU graduates
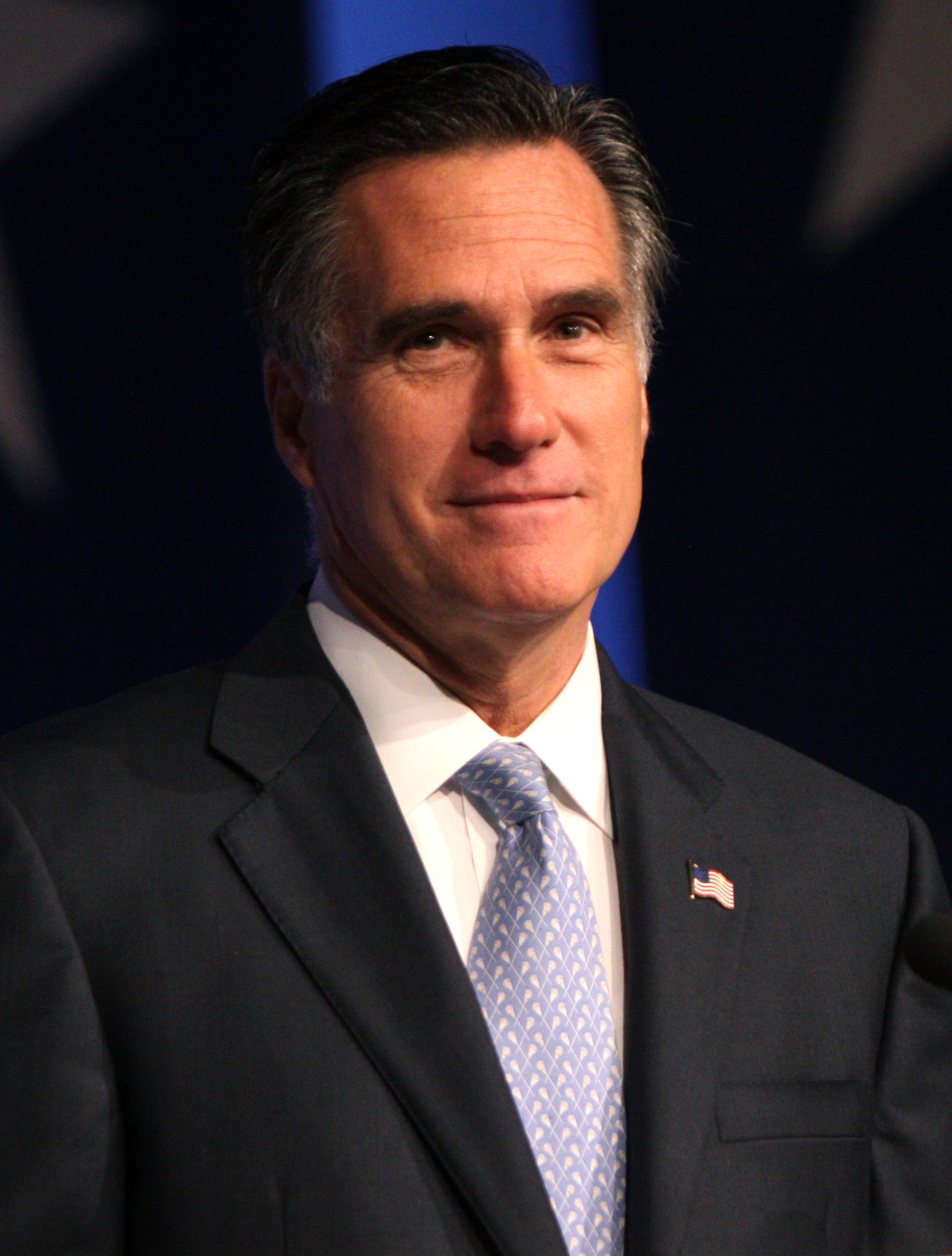
Mitt Romney '71, U.S. senator (Utah), governor of Massachusetts

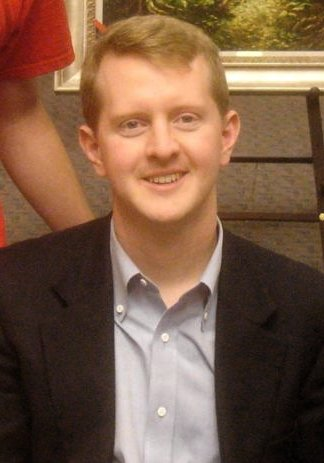
Ken Jennings '00, all-time winningest game show contestant

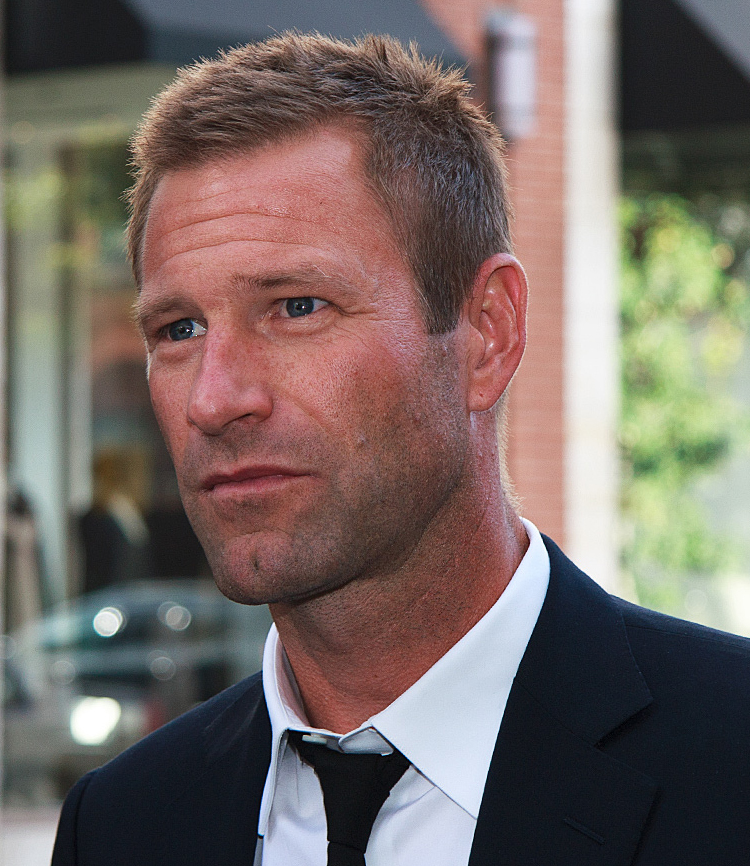
Aaron Eckhart '94, actor

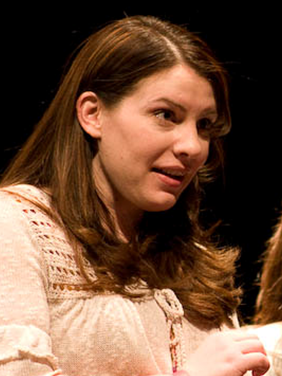
Stephenie Meyer '95, author of the Twilight series

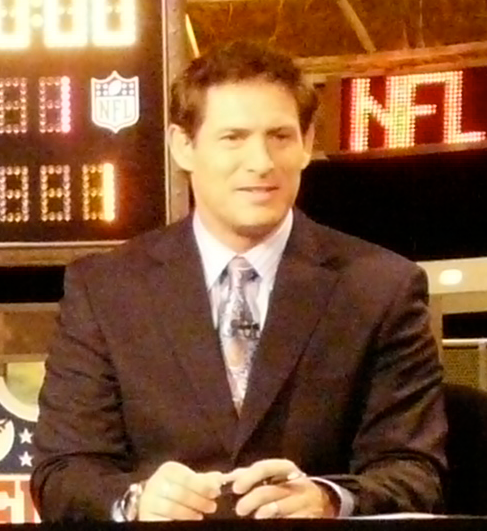
Steve Young '84 & '94, Pro Football Hall of Fame quarterback

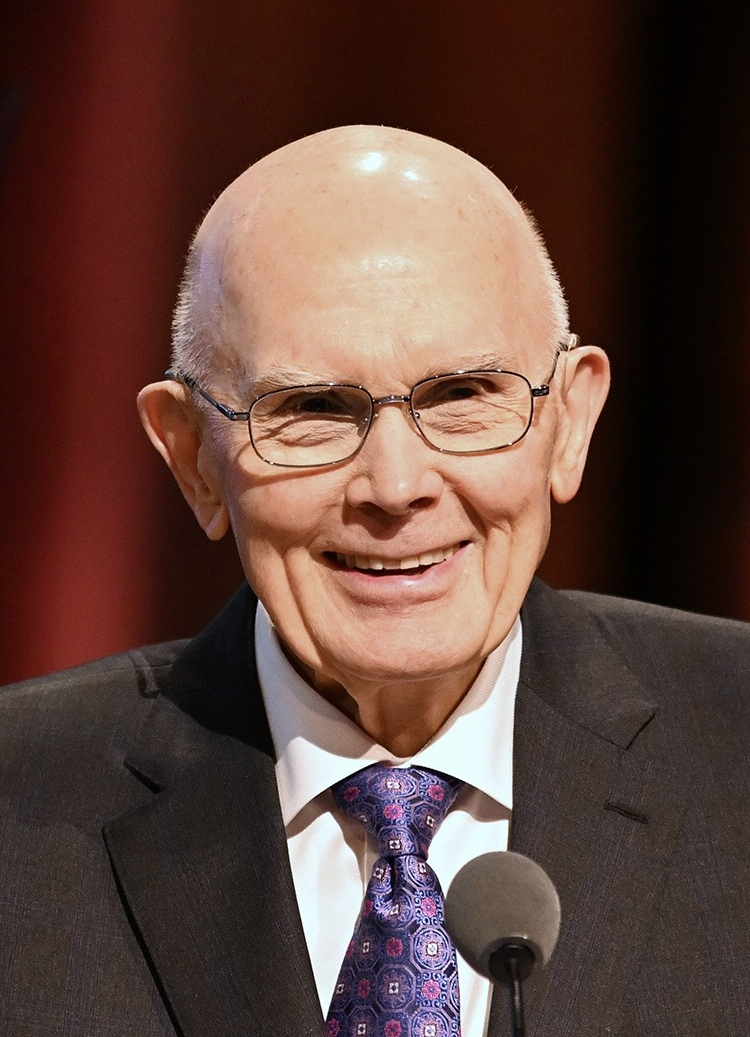
Dallin H. Oaks '54, president of the Church of Jesus Christ of Latter-day Saints

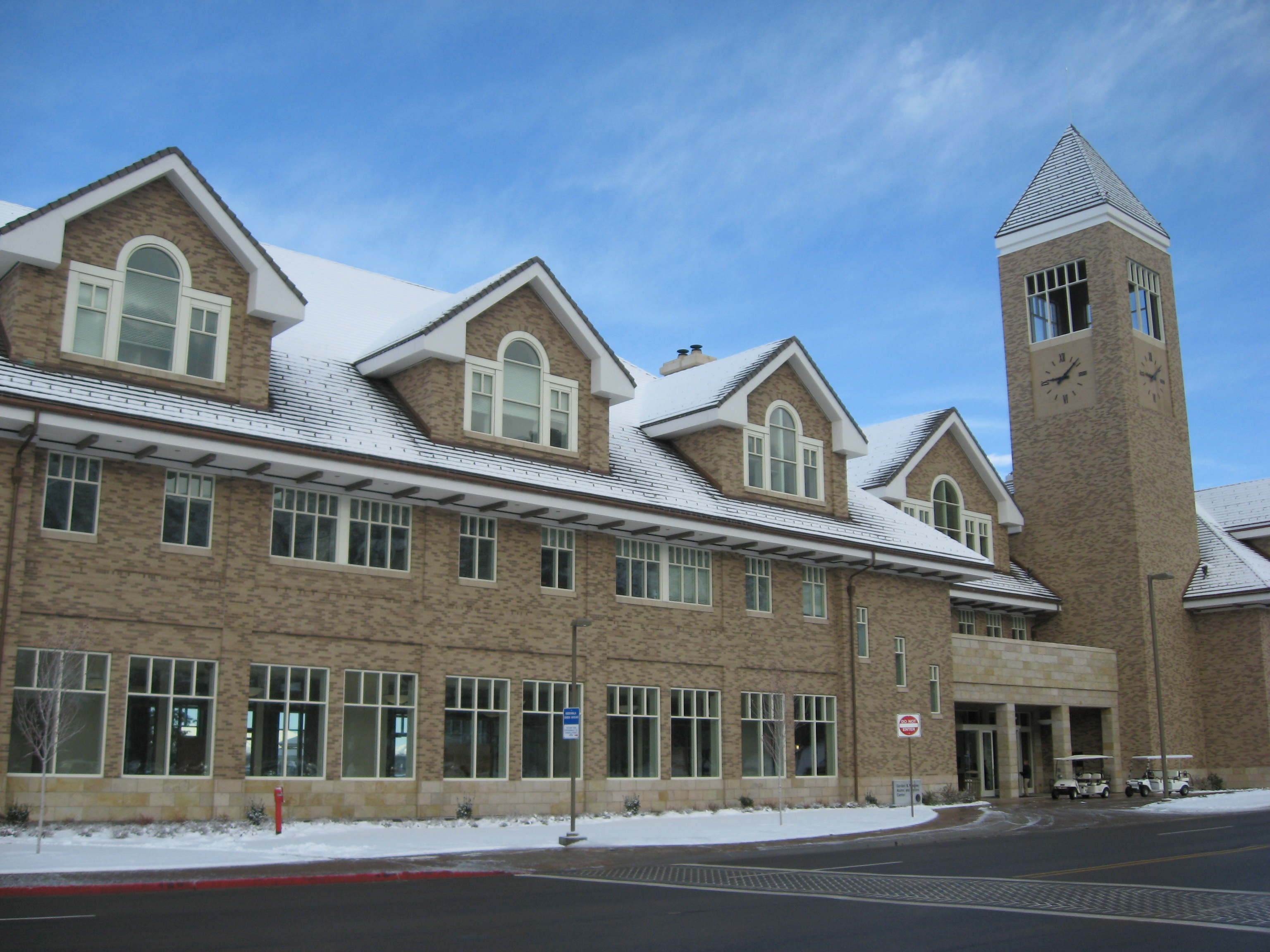
The Gordon B. Hinckley Alumni and Visitors Center, built in 2007

This list of Brigham Young University alumni includes notable graduates, non-graduate former students, and current students of Brigham Young University (BYU), a private, coeducational research university owned by the Church of Jesus Christ of Latter-day Saints (LDS Church) located in Provo, Utah, United States. It is the oldest existing institution within the LDS Church's Educational System, is America's largest religious university, and has the second-largest private university enrollment in the United States. Approximately 98% of the 34,000 students at BYU are members of the LDS Church; two-thirds of its American students come from outside the state of Utah. In addition to its undergraduate program, BYU offers graduate degrees in 47 departments and includes two professional schools: the Marriott School of Business and the J. Reuben Clark Law School. As of 2023, BYU has 455,907 living alumni.

Over 26 BYU graduates have served in the U.S. Senate and U.S. House of Representatives, such as former Dean of the U.S. Senate Reed Smoot (class of 1879). Cabinet members of American presidents include former United States Secretary of Agriculture to President Dwight D. Eisenhower, Ezra Taft Benson '26 and Rex E. Lee '60, who was U.S. Solicitor General under President Ronald Reagan. Mitt Romney, former Governor of Massachusetts and 2008 presidential candidate and 2012 Republican presidential nominee, was valedictorian of his class in 1971.

BYU alumni in academia include former dean of the Harvard Business School Kim B. Clark, a vice president of Yale, Scott Strobel '87, and Michael K. Young '73, president of Texas A&M University and former president of the University of Washington. The university also graduated Nobel Prize winner Paul D. Boyer, as well as Philo Farnsworth (inventor of the electronic television) and Harvey Fletcher (inventor of the hearing aid). Seven of BYU's twelve presidents were alumni of the university. Alumni of BYU who have served as business leaders include Citigroup CFO Gary Crittenden '76, former Dell CEO Kevin Rollins '84, Deseret Book CEO Sheri L. Dew, and Matthew K. McCauley, CEO of children's clothing company Gymboree.

In literature and journalism, BYU has produced several best-selling authors, including Orson Scott Card '75, Brandon Sanderson '00 & '05, and Stephenie Meyer '95. Other media personalities include ESPN sportscaster and former Miss America Sharlene Wells Hawkes '88 and former co-host of CBS's The Early Show Jane Clayson Johnson '90. In entertainment and television, BYU is represented by Jon Heder '02 (best known for his role as Napoleon Dynamite), Golden Globe-nominated Aaron Eckhart '94, and Jeopardy! all-time champion Ken Jennings '00. In the music industry BYU is represented by former American Idol contestant Carmen Rasmusen and The Tabernacle Choir at Temple Square director Mack Wilberg.

BYU has also produced several leaders of religion. Alumni have comprised several LDS Church general authorities, including three church presidents (Dallin H. Oaks '54, Thomas S. Monson '74, and Ezra Taft Benson '26), six apostles (Clark G. Gilbert '94, Neil L. Andersen '75, D. Todd Christofferson '69, David A. Bednar '76, Jeffrey R. Holland '65 & '66, and Reed Smoot 1879), and two general presidents of the Relief Society (Julie B. Beck '73 and Belle Spafford '20).

A number of BYU alumni have found success in professional sports, representing the university in 7 MLB World Series, 5 NBA Finals, and 25 NFL Super Bowls. In baseball, BYU alumni include All-Stars Rick Aguilera '83, Wally Joyner '84, and Jack Morris '76. Professional basketball players include three-time NBA Finals champion Danny Ainge '81 and three-time Olympic medalist Krešimir Ćosić '73. BYU also claims notable professional football players including Super Bowl MVP Steve Young '84 & '94, Heisman Trophy winner Ty Detmer '90, and two-time Super Bowl winner Jim McMahon. In golf, BYU alumni include two major championship winners: Johnny Miller ('69) at the 1973 U.S. Open and 1976 British Open and Mike Weir ('92) at the 2003 Masters.

== Academia and research ==
=== University administration ===
Name	Class year(s)	Degree(s)	Notability	Reference
Stan L. Albrecht	1966	B.S.	15th president of Utah State University	
David A. Bednar	1976	M.O.B. (Marriott)	14th president of BYU-Idaho	
Michael T. Benson	1990	B.A.	3rd president of Coastal Carolina University; 12th president of Eastern Kentucky University; 15th president of Southern Utah University; 14th president of Snow College	
J. Elliot Cameron	1949; 1949	B.S. M.S.	9th president of Snow College; 6th president of BYU-Hawaii	
Stanford Cazier	—	(transferred to Utah before graduating)	14th president of California State University, Chico; 12th president of Utah State University	
Kim B. Clark	—	(transferred to Harvard University before graduating)	17th commissioner of Church Education; 15th president of BYU-Idaho; Dean of Harvard Business School	
Alison Davis-Blake	1979; 1982	B.S. M.O.B. (Marriott)	8th president of Bentley University; dean of the Ross School of Business at the University of Michigan	
John Maximillian Dunn	1972	Ed.D.	8th president of Western Michigan University	
William G. Dyer	1950; 1952	B.A. M.A.	4th dean of the BYU Marriott School of Business	
Henry J. Eyring	1985; 1989; 1989	B.S. M.B.A. (Marriott); J.D. (Clark)	17th president of BYU-Idaho; director of the BYU MBA program	
John R. Grout	1984	B.S. (Marriott)	Dean of the Berry College Campbell School of Business	
Bruce C. Hafen	1964	B.A.	11th president of BYU-Idaho; 3rd dean of the J. Reuben Clark Law School	
Franklin S. Harris	1907		5th president of BYU	
Jeffrey R. Holland	1965; 1966	B.A. M.A	9th president of BYU	
Matthew S. Holland	1991	B.A.	6th president of Utah Valley University	
John S. K. Kauwe III	1999; 2003	B.S. M.S.	11th president of Brigham Young University–Hawaii	
Vern O. Knudsen	1915	B.A.	Chancellor of the University of California at Los Angeles	
Rex E. Lee	1960; 1996	B.A. Hon. D.L.	10th president of BYU; 1st dean of J. Reuben Clark Law School	
John W. Limbong	1978	M.S.	President of the University of International Golden Indonesia	
Brigitte C. Madrian	1989; 1989	B.A. M.A.	10th dean of the BYU Marriott School of Business	
F. Ann Millner	1986	Ed.D.	11th president of Weber State University	
Stephen D. Nadauld	1968	B.S.	17th president of Dixie State College; 9th president of Weber State University; director of BYU MBA program	
Dallin H. Oaks	1954	B.A.	8th president of BYU; interim dean of University of Chicago Law School	
V. Lane Rawlins	1963	B.S.	President of University of North Texas; 9th president of the Washington State University	
Wilson W. Sorenson	1940; 1973	B.A. M.Ed.	2nd president of Utah Technical College (now Utah Valley University)	
Scott Strobel	1987	B.A.	Provost of Yale University (2020–present)	
Weldon J. Taylor	1934	B.S.	1st dean of the BYU Marriott School of Business	
Astrid S. Tuminez	1986	B.A.	7th president of Utah Valley University	
Dale A. Whitman	1963	B.S.	Former dean of the University of Missouri School of Law; former president of the Association of American Law Schools	
O. Meredith Wilson	1934	B.A.	9th president of the University of Oregon (1954–1960); president of the University of Minnesota (1960–1967)	
Kevin J Worthen	1979; 1982	B.A. J.D. (Clark)	13th president of BYU; 5th dean of the J. Reuben Clark Law School	
Michael K. Young	1973	B.A.	25th president of Texas A&M University; 33rd president of the University of Washington; 17th president of the University of Utah; dean of The George Washington University Law School	

=== Professors and researchers ===
Name	Class year(s)	Degree(s)	Notability	Reference
Randy L. Bott	1988	Ed.D.	Professor of religion, 2008 Ratemyprofessors.com Best Professor	
Paul D. Boyer	1939	B.S.	Co-winner of 1997 Nobel Prize in Chemistry for his research on the enzymatic mechanism underlying the synthesis of adenosine triphosphate (ATP)	
Stephen Cameron	1986	B.A.	Studies on GED; Columbia University professor and financial analyst	
Clayton M. Christensen	1975	B.A.	Coined the term "disruptive technology"; Harvard Business School professor	
J. Scott Dutcher	2002	B.S. (Marriott)	Winner of 2006 Burton Award for Legal Achievement	
Kathleen Flake	1974	B.A.	Richard Lyman Bushman Professor of Mormon Studies at the University of Virginia (2013–2024); former associate professor of American Religious History at the Vanderbilt University	
Philo Farnsworth	1923; 1968	B.S. Hon. D.Sc.	Co-inventor of the electronic television	
Harvey Fletcher	1907	B.S.	Physicist credited with invention of the hearing aid; founding dean of the BYU College of Engineering	
Terryl Givens	1981	B.A.	Senior research fellow at Brigham Young University; professor emeritus of Literature and Religion at the University of Richmond	
Chauncy Harris	1933	B.A. (valedictorian)	Pioneer of modern geography and expert on Soviet and American urban geography; BYU's first Rhodes Scholar	
Kate Holbrook		B.A.	Managing Historian at the Church of Jesus Chirst of Latter-day Saints	
David F. Holland	1998	B.A.	Professor at Harvard Divinity School; director of graduate studies in religion at Harvard University	
Howard Judd	1959	B.S.	Medical researcher in field of women's health	
Patrick Q. Mason	1999	B.A.	Professor of Religious Studies and History at Utah State University; former professor of religion at Claremont Graduate University	
Tracianne Neilsen	1992	B.S.	Professor of physics at Brigham Young University	
Rulon D. Pope	1971	B.S.	Warren and Wilson Dusenberry Professor at Brigham Young University, specializing in agricultural economics	
Nathan Oman	1999	B.A.	Rita Anne Rollins Professor of Law at William & Mary Law School	
W. Paul Reeve	1992; 1994	B.A. M.A.	Professor of History at the University of Utah	
Charles Reigeluth	1977	Ph.D.	Instructional design theory researcher and developer	
Donald W. Roberts	1957	B.A.	Biological pest control research professor	
Tara Westover	2008	B.A.	Historian and author	
Nathan Whetten	1926; 1928	B.A. M.A.	Sociologist; dean of the Graduate School at the University of Connecticut	
David A. Wiley	2000	Ph.D.	Coined the term "open content"	
Angus M. Woodbury	1927	B.S.	Utah ecologist, first naturalist at Zion National Park	

== Arts ==
Name	Class	Degree	Notability	Reference
Earl W. Bascom	1940	B.A.	Cowboy artist and sculptor called "cowboy of cowboy artists"	
Don Bluth	1954	B.A.	Director, producer, and animator of films	
Blair Buswell	1984	B.A.	Sports sculptor	
James C. Christensen	1967; 1968	B.A. M.A.	Fantasy painter	
Brian Lee Durfee		B.F.A	Wildlife, landscape, and fantasy artist, fantasy and horror author	
Dan Lemmon	1997	B.F.A	Academy Award-winning visual effects artist of films such as Lord of the Rings (2001, 2002, 2003) and The Jungle Book (2016)	
Jon McNaughton		B.A.	Painter	
Kathleen Peterson		B.A.	Painter	
Reed P. Smoot	1969	B.A. M.A.	Master cinematographer	
Eugene Tapahe	1992; 2024	B.F.A. M.F.A.	Photographer	
Rita Wright	1976; 1997	B.A. M.A.	Art historian, museum director of the Springville Museum of Art	

== Business and finance ==
Name	Class year(s)	Degree(s)	Notability	Reference
Bill Aho	1983	MBA (Marriott)	Former CEO of ClearPlay Inc.	
Fraser Bullock	1978; 1980	B.S. (Marriott); MBA (Marriott)	Managing director, Sorenson Capital; former CEO of Salt Lake Olympic Committee	
M. Anthony Burns	1963	B.S.	Former president and CEO of Ryder Systems	
Dave Checketts	1983	MBA (Marriott)	Former president of Madison Square Garden; former general manager of the Utah Jazz; owner of the Major League Soccer franchise Real Salt Lake; owner of the National Hockey League franchise St. Louis Blues	
Jonathan C. Coon	1994	B.A.	CEO and co-founder of 1-800 Contacts	
Stephen Covey	1994	DRE	Author of New York Times bestseller The Seven Habits of Highly Effective People, listed in Time magazine's Top 25 most influential Americans	
Gary Crittenden	1967	B.S. (Marriott)	CFO of Citigroup Inc.	
Richard Culatta	2003 2006	B.A. M.S.	CEO of the International Society for Technology in Education	
Sheri L. Dew	1967	B.A.	CEO of Deseret Book, author	
Jeff Green	2001	B.A.	Co-founder, chairman, and CEO of buy-side digital advertising platform the Trade Desk	
Nathan Gwilliam	2014	MBA	Founder and CEO of Adoption.com	
Josh James	—	(never graduated)	Founder and CEO of Domo; co-founder and former CEO of Omniture	
Bryan Johnson	2005	B.A.	Founder and CEO of Kernel and OS Fund; founder, chairman and CEO of Braintree	
Rex Maughan	—	(transferred to ASU before graduating)	Founder, president and CEO of Forever Living Products	
Darl McBride	1984	B.S.	CEO of The SCO Group	
Brady Nelson	2002	B.S. (Marriott)	Majority owner of Spokane Shock	
Kevin Rollins	1983; 1984	B.A. MBA (Marriott)	Former president and CEO of Dell Computers	
Mitt Romney	1971	B.A. (valedictorian)	Founder of Bain Capital; former CEO of Bain & Company, former U.S. senator and CEO of the Salt Lake Organizing Committee for the Olympic and Paralympic Winter Games of 2002	
Blake Roney	1983	B.S.	Founder and former chairman of Nu Skin Enterprises	
Aaron Skonnard	1996	B.S.	Co-founder and former CEO of Pluralsight	
Ryan Smith	2016	B.S. (Marriott)	Owner of the Utah Jazz and Utah Mammoth, co-founder of Qualtrics	
Cydni Tetro	1998	MBA (Marriott)	CEO of Brandless, co-founder of Women Tech Council	

== Entertainment ==
Name	Class year(s)	Degree(s)	Notability	Reference
Britani Bateman		BFA	Actress, singer and cast member on The Real Housewives of Salt Lake City	
Don Collier		B.A.	Western film and television actor	
Jeremy Coon	2002	B.A.	Producer of the film Napoleon Dynamite	
C. Jay Cox	1986	B.A.	Director and screenwriter	
Brian Crane	1973	B.A.	Creator of Pickles comic strip	
Mitch Davis	1982	B.A.	Film director and producer	
Curt Doussett		B.A.	Actor, host on Discovery Channel's Hazard Pay, owner of ComedySportz Utah	
Richard Dutcher	1988	B.A.	Film director, producer and actor; "father of Mormon cinema"	
Aaron Eckhart	1994	B.A.	Golden Globe-nominated film actor best known for his roles in Thank You For Smoking (2006), Erin Brockovich (2000), Paycheck (2003), and The Dark Knight (2008)	
Mireille Enos	1997	B.A.	Tony Award-nominated film and television actor	
Steven Fales	1994	B.A.	Playwright and actor	
Heather Gay	1995	B.A.	Television personality and author, known for The Real Housewives of Salt Lake City	
Ryan Hamilton	2000	B.A.	Stand-up comedian	
Jon Heder	2004	BFA	Actor in Napoleon Dynamite (2004), Just Like Heaven (2005), The Benchwarmers (2006), School for Scoundrels (2006), Blades of Glory (2007)	
Brett Helquist	1993	BFA	Illustrator best known for his work on A Series of Unfortunate Events	
Jared and Jerusha Hess	2002	B.A.	Directors and screenwriters of Napoleon Dynamite (2004) and Nacho Libre (2006)	
Ken Jennings	2000	B.A. B.S.	Jeopardy! all-time champion and subsequent co-host	
Neil LaBute	1995	B.A.	Film director, screenwriter, playwright	
Kieth Merrill	1967	B.A.	Academy Award-winning film director	
Aaron Ruell	2001	B.A.	Actor, filmmaker	
Tim Skousen	2001	B.A.	Filmmaker, The Sasquatch Gang (2006)	
Daryn Tufts	1998	B.A.	Director and screenwriter	
Johnny Whitaker	1986	B.A.	Actor best known for role in Family Affair	

== Government and politics ==
=== Members of the United States Cabinet ===
Name	Class year(s)	Degree(s)	Notability	Reference
Ezra Taft Benson	1926	B.S.	U.S. secretary of agriculture for Dwight D. Eisenhower (1953–1961)	
Jamieson Greer	2004	B.A.	20th U.S. trade representative (2025–)	

=== United States governors ===
Name	Class year(s)	Degree(s)	Notability	Reference
Norman H. Bangerter	1955	B.A.	13th governor of Utah (1985–1993)	
Henry H. Blood	—	(never graduated)	7th governor of Utah (1933–1941)	
Gary Herbert	—	(never graduated)	17th governor of Utah (2009–2021)	
Culbert Olson	1895	B.A.	29th governor of California (1939–1943)	
Mitt Romney	1971	B.A.	70th governor of Massachusetts (2003–2007), 2012 Republican presidential nominee	
Olene S. Walker	1953	B.S.	15th governor of Utah (2003–2005)	

=== Members of the United States Congress ===
Note: "D" indicates a Democrat while "R" indicates a Republican.

==== Senators ====
Name	Class year(s)	Degree(s)	Notability	Reference
John Curtis	1985	B.S.	Senator (R) from Utah (2025–present)	
Mike Crapo	1973	B.A.	Senator (R) from Idaho (1999–present)	
Jeff Flake	1986; 1987	B.A. M.A.	Former senator (R) from Arizona (2013–2019); ambassador of the United States to Turkey (2022–2024)	
Orrin Hatch	1958	B.A.	Former senator (R) from Utah (1977–2019); president pro tempore (2015–2019)	
William H. King	1887	B.S.	Former senator (D) from Utah (1917–1941); president pro tempore (1940–1941)	
Mike Lee	1994; 1997	B.S. J.D. (Clark)	Senator (R) from Utah (2011–present)	
Bert H. Miller	1901		Former senator (D) from Idaho (1949)	
Mitt Romney	1971	B.A.	Former senator (R) from Utah (2019–2025), 70th governor of Massachusetts, 2012 Republican presidential nominee	
Kyrsten Sinema	1995	B.A.	Former senator (D, later I) from Arizona (2019–2025)	
Gordon H. Smith	1976	B.A.	Former senator (R) from Oregon (1997–2009), CEO of National Association of Broadcasters	
Reed Smoot	1879	High school diploma	Former senator (R) from Utah (1903–1933)	
George Sutherland	1881		Former senator (R) from Utah (1905–1917)	
Arthur Vivian Watkins	—	(never graduated)	Former senator (R) from Utah (1947–1959)	

==== Representatives ====
Name	Class year(s)	Degree(s)	Notability	Reference
Andy Biggs	1982	B.A.	Representative (R) from Arizona's 5th congressional district (2017–present)	
Chris Cannon	1974; 1980	B.A. J.D. (Clark)	Representative (R) from Utah's 3rd congressional district (1997–2009)	
Jason Chaffetz	1989	B.A.	Representative (R) from Utah's 3rd congressional district (2009–2017)	
Don B. Colton	1896	B.A.	Representative (R) from Utah's 1st congressional district (1921–1933)	
John Curtis		B.S.	Representative (R) from Utah's 3rd congressional district (2017–2025)	
Henry Aldous Dixon	1914		Representative (R) from Utah's 1st congressional district (1955–1961)	
Eni Fa'aua'a Hunkin Faleomavaega, Jr.	1966	B.A.	Delegate to Congress (D) from American Samoa (1989–2015)	
Jeff Flake	1986; 1987	B.A. M.A.	Representative (R) from Arizona's 6th congressional district (2003–2013); from Arizona's 1st congressional district (2001–2003)	
Mike Kennedy	1994; 2007	B.S. J.D. (Clark)	Representative (R) from Utah's 3rd congressional district (2025–present)	
Enid Greene Mickelsen	1983	J.D. (Clark)	Representative (R) from Utah's 2nd congressional district (1995–1997)	
Ralph R. Harding	1956		Representative (D) from Idaho's 2nd congressional district (1961–1965)	
William H. King	1887	B.S.	Representative (D) from Utah's 1st congressional district (1897–1899; 1900–1901)	
Raúl Labrador	1992	B.A.	Representative (R) from Idaho's 1st congressional district (2011–2019)	
Celeste Maloy	2015	J.D. (Clark)	Representative (R) from Utah's 2nd congressional district (2023–present)	
Buck McKeon	1985	B.A.	Representative (R) from California's 25th congressional district (1993–2015)	
Bill Orton	1973; 1979	B.A. J.D. (Clark)	Representative (D) from Utah's 3rd congressional district (1991–1997)	
Ron Packard	1975	B.S.	Representative (R) from California's 43rd and 48th congressional districts (1983–2001)	
J. W. Robinson	1909	B.S.	Representative (D) from Utah's 2nd congressional district (1933–1947)	
Matt Salmon	1986	MPA (Marriott)	Representative (R) from Arizona's 1st congressional district (2013–2017)	
Karen Shepherd	1963	M.A.	Representative (D) from Utah's 2nd congressional district (1993–1995)	
Kyrsten Sinema	1995	B.A.	Representative (D) from Arizona's 9th congressional district (2013–2019)	
George Sutherland	1881	B.A.	Representative (R) from Utah's 1st congressional district (1901–1903)	

=== United States state constitutional officers ===
Name	Class year(s)	Degree(s)	Notability	Reference
Scott Bedke		B.S.	Lieutenant governor of Idaho (2023–present)	
Debbie Critchfield		B.A.	Idaho superintendent of Public Instruction (2023–present)	
Larry EchoHawk	1970	B.S.	Assistant secretary of the Interior for Indian Affairs for Barack Obama (2009–2012); former Idaho attorney general (1991–1995)	
Julie Ellsworth		B.A.	Idaho state treasurer (2019–present)	
Deidre Henderson	2021	B.A.	Lieutenant governor of Utah (2021–present)	
Marilyn Howard		Ed.D.	Former Idaho superintendent of Public Instruction (1999–2007)	
Mark Hutchison	1990	J.D.	Former lieutenant governor of Nevada (2015–2019)	
Raúl Labrador	1992	B.A.	Idaho attorney general (2023–present)	
Marlo Oaks		B.S.	Utah state treasurer (2021–present)	
Lawrence Wasden	1982	B.A.	Former Idaho attorney general (2003–2023)	
J. D. Williams	1967	B.A. MPA (Marriott)	Former Idaho state controller (1989–2002)	

=== Government officials outside the U.S. ===
Name	Class year(s)	Degree(s)	Notability	Reference
Cindy Ady	1979	B.A.	Former member of the Legislative Assembly of Alberta, Canada	
Krešimir Ćosić	1973	B.A.	Former Croatian diplomat to the U.S.	
Jeffrey Max Jones	1982	B.A.	Former Undersecretary of Agriculture, Mexico	
Greg Melchin	1977	B.A.	Former Alberta Minister of Energy; former member of Legislative Assembly of Alberta	
Bhichit Rattakul	1976	Ph.D.	Former governor of Bangkok, Thailand	
Yeah Samake		M.P.P.	Mali ambassador to India, 2013 presidential candidate of Mali, and former mayor of Ouelessebougou	

=== Other U.S. political figures ===
Name	Class year(s)	Degree(s)	Notability	Reference
Joseph A. Cannon	1974; 1977	B.A. J.D. (Clark)	Former chairman of Utah Republican Party and managing editor of Deseret News	
Kathleen Clark	—	(never graduated) (Clark)	Director of the U.S. Bureau of Land Management	
Kristen Cox	1995	B.S.	Appointed by George W. Bush as special assistant to the commissioner of Rehabilitation Services Administration in the U.S. Department of Education	
Earl J. Glade	1912	B.A.	25th mayor of Salt Lake City	
Rex E. Lee	1960; 1996	B.A. Hon. D.L.	Former U.S. Solicitor General	
Roger B. Porter	1970	B.A.	Director of White House Office of Policy Development in the Reagan administration; executive secretary of the President's Economic Policy Board during the Ford administration; Rhodes Scholar; Harvard University professor of business and government	
Clark L. Reber			Member of the Utah House of Representatives	
Rory Reid	1985; 1988	B.A. J.D. (Clark)	Former chairman of the Clark County Commission, Nevada	
Ronna Romney McDaniel		B.A.	Chairwoman of the Republican National Committee	
Kyle Sampson	1993	B.A.	Former chief of staff and counselor to U.S. Attorney General Alberto Gonzales; key player in controversy surrounding dismissal of U.S. attorneys	
Paull Shin	1962	B.A.	Member (D) of the Washington State Senate	
Scott Smith	1980	B.S.	38th mayor of Mesa, Arizona	
Nick Udall	1936		Former mayor of Phoenix, Arizona	
Paul M. Warner	1973; 1976; 1984	B.A. J.D. (Clark); MPA (Marriott)	Chairman of the Attorney General's Advisory Committee of U.S. Attorneys	
Max Williams	1987		Oregon state legislator and Department of Corrections director	
Noall Wootton	1961	B.A.	County attorney who prosecuted Gary Gilmore, the first person executed in the U.S. after the death penalty was reinstated in 1976; portrayed by Charles Cyphers in the film The Executioner's Song	

== Journalism and media ==
Name	Class year(s)	Degree(s)	Notability	Reference
Carlos Amezcua	1975	B.A.	Anchor for Fox affiliate KTTV in Los Angeles, California; former morning anchor for KTLA	
Heather Armstrong	1997	B.A.	Author of popular blog dooce	
Pat Bagley	1978	B.A.	Editorial cartoonist, journalist, and author	
Steve Benson	1978	BFA	Pulitzer Prize-winning editorial cartoonist	
Clayton Brough	1974	B.S. M.S.	Weatherman of ABC 4	
Joe Dana	2003	B.A.	Anchor for NBC affiliate KPNX in Phoenix, Arizona	
Kent Dana	1968	B.A.	Anchor for CBS affiliate KPHO; "Dean" of Valley newscasters in metropolitan Phoenix, Arizona	
Steve Eagar	1987	B.A.	Anchor for Fox affiliate KDFW in Dallas/Fort Worth, Texas	
Amy Freeze	1995	B.A.	Meteorologist for Fox affiliate WFLD in Chicago, Illinois	
Pete Grigsby	1989	B.A.	Meteorologist for ABC affiliate KMBC in Kansas City, Missouri	
Jane Clayson Johnson	1990	B.A.	Former co-host of The Early Show on CBS	
Gifford Nielsen	1983	B.A.	Sports broadcaster for KUHF Houston	
Kelsey Nixon	2007	B.A.	Television chef	
Dick Nourse	1962	B.A.	Former anchor for NBC affiliate KSL-TV in Salt Lake City, Utah	
Art Rascon	1985	B.A.	Anchor for ABC affiliate KTRK in Houston, Texas	
Holly Rowe	—	(transferred to Utah before graduating)	Emmy-nominated sports telecaster, writer and producer for ESPN, KBYU, and FOX13	
Jim Siebert	1992	B.A.	Meteorologist for Fox affiliate KRIV in Houston, Texas	
Vai Sikahema	2002	B.A.	Sports director and anchor for NBC affiliate WCAU in Philadelphia, Pennsylvania	
Ben Swann	1993	B.A.	Investigative journalist and news anchor, Edward R. Murrow Award and Emmy Award winner	

== Law and judiciary ==
=== Justices of the Supreme Court of the United States ===
Name	Class year(s)	Degree(s)	Notability	Reference
George Sutherland	1881	B.A.	Associate justice of the Supreme Court of the United States	

=== U.S. circuit judges ===
Name	Class year(s)	Degree(s)	Notability	Reference
Jay S. Bybee	1977; 1980	B.A. J.D. (Clark)	Senior U.S. circuit judge for the U.S. Court of Appeals for the Ninth Circuit	
Thomas B. Griffith	1978	B.A.	Former U.S. circuit judge for the U.S. Court of Appeals for the District of Columbia Circuit	
Kent A. Jordan	1981	B.A.	U.S. circuit judge for the U.S. Court of Appeals for the Third Circuit	
Monroe G. McKay	1957	B.S.	Former chief U.S. circuit judge for the U.S. Court of Appeals for the Tenth Circuit	
Ryan D. Nelson	1996; 1999	B.A. J.D. (Clark)	U.S. circuit judge for the U.S. Court of Appeals for the Ninth Circuit	
Richard Paez	1969	B.A.	Senior U.S. circuit judge for the U.S. Court of Appeals for the Ninth Circuit	
Randall Ray Rader	1974	B.A.	Former chief U.S. circuit judge for the United States Court of Appeals for the Federal Circuit	
Milan Smith	1966	B.A.	U.S. circuit judge for the U.S. Court of Appeals for the Ninth Circuit	
N. Randy Smith	1974; 1977	B.A. J.D. (Clark)	Senior U.S. circuit judge for the U.S. Court of Appeals for the Ninth Circuit	

=== Justices of state supreme courts ===
Name	Class year(s)	Degree(s)	Notability	Reference
G. Richard Bevan	1984; 1987	B.S. J.D. (Clark)	Chief justice, Idaho Supreme Court	
Matthew B. Durrant	1981	B.A.	Former Justice, Utah Supreme Court	
Charles E. Jones	1959	B.A.	Former chief justice, Arizona Supreme Court	
Jay Jorgensen	1994; 1997	B.A. J.D. (Clark)	Justice, Utah Supreme Court	
Thomas Rex Lee	1988	B.A.	Former Justice, Utah Supreme Court	
Gregory Moeller	1987; 1990	B.S. J.D. (Clark)	Justice, Idaho Supreme Court	
Dallin H. Oaks	1954	B.A.	Former justice, Utah Supreme Court	

=== U.S. district judges ===
Name	Class year(s)	Degree(s)	Notability	Reference
David Barlow	1995	B.A.	U.S. district judge for the U.S. District Court for the District of Utah	
Dee Benson	1973; 1976	B.A. J.D. (Clark)	Judge of the Foreign Intelligence Surveillance Court	
Lloyd D. George	1955	B.S.	Former chief U.S. district judge for the U.S. District Court for the District of Nevada; Lloyd D. George Federal Courthouse namesake	
Roger L. Hunt	1966	B.A.	Former chief U.S. district judge for the U.S. District Court for the District of Nevada	
Robert Clive Jones	1971	B.S.	Former chief U.S. district judge for the U.S. District Court for the District of Nevada	
Dale A. Kimball	1964	B.A.	U.S. district judge for the U.S. District Court for the District of Utah	
Michael W. Mosman	1984	J.D. (Clark)	Chief U.S. district judge for the U.S. District Court for the District of Oregon	
Howard C. Nielson Jr.	1992	B.A.	U.S. district judge for the U.S. District Court for the District of Utah	
David Nuffer	1975; 1978	B.A. J.D. (Clark)	Chief U.S. district judge for the U.S. District Court for the District of Utah	
David Nye	1982; 1986	B.A. J.D. (Clark)	U.S. district judge of the United States District Court for the District of Idaho	
David Sam	1957	B.S.	U.S. district judge for the U.S. District Court for the District of Utah	
G. Murray Snow	1984; 1987	B.A. J.D. (Clark)	U.S. district judge for the U.S. District Court for the District of Arizona	
Clark Waddoups	1970	B.A.	U.S. district judge for the U.S. District Court for the District of Utah	

== Literature, writing, and translation ==
Name	Class year(s)	Degree(s)	Notability	Reference
Elizabeth H. Boyer			Author of Norse mythology-influenced Alfar fantasy novel series	
Juanita Brooks	1925	B.A.	Author of The Mountain Meadows Massacre	
Orson Scott Card	1975	B.A.	Author of Ender's Game, recipient of two Hugo and Nebula Awards	
Ronald G. Carter	1975	B.A.	Author of Prelude to Glory	
James Dashner	1999; 1999	B.A. M.A.	Author of The Maze Runner	
Brian Evenson	1989	B.A.	Author of Father of Lies and recipient of three O. Henry Awards	
Becca Fitzpatrick	2001	B.S.	Author of the Hush, Hush series	
Steven L. Kent	1986; 1990	B.A. M.A.	Writer, known for video game journalism and military science fiction novels	
Brian McClellan	2009	B.A.	Author of The Powder Mage trilogy	
Stephenie Meyer	1995	B.A.	Author of the Twilight series and The Host	
Brandon Mull	2000	B.A.	Author of New York Times best-selling Fablehaven fantasy series	
Joe Navarro	1975	B.S.	Former FBI psychological profiler; author of Dangerous Personality Types and other books on decoding human behavior	
Jay A. Parry	1974	B.A.	Author of LDS non-fiction, best known for compiling Deseret Book's Best-Loved and Everyday series	
Kerry Patterson	1976	M.O.B. (Marriott)	Co-author of New York Times best seller Crucial Conversations	
Carol Lynn Pearson	1968	B.A.	Author of musical My Turn On Earth	
Brandon Sanderson	2000; 2005	B.A. M.A.	Author of The Stormlight Archive, Mistborn series, and the final three books in the late Robert Jordan's The Wheel of Time series, recipient of a Hugo Award and a David Gemmell Legend Award	
Samuel W. Taylor	1930		Author of short stories on which the Disney movies The Absent-Minded Professor, Flubber, and Son of Flubber were based	
Robison Wells	2009	MBA (Marriott)	Author of The Counterfeit, president of the Whitney Awards	
Jack Weyland	1969	Ph.D.	Author of Charly	
Dave Wolverton		B.A.	Author of The Runelords series, English professor of creative writing at Brigham Young University 1999–2002	

== Music ==
Name	Class year(s)	Degree(s)	Notability	Reference
Kurt Bestor	1993	B.A.	Emmy Award-winning and Grammy Award-nominated composer	
Elaine Bradley		B.S.	Drummer for Billboard Music Award winners Neon Trees	
Ariel Bybee	1965	B.S.	Mezzo-soprano at the Metropolitan Opera for 18 seasons	
Sam Cardon	1993	B.A.	Emmy Award-winning composer	
Rob Gardner		B.S.	Composer	
Daniel E. Gawthrop	1988	B.Mus.	Composer	
Gregg Hale	—	(never graduated)	Guitarist for Spiritualized	
Merrill Jenson	1980	B.Mus.	Film composer for multiple IMAX and LDS films, including The Testaments of One Fold and One Shepherd	
Michael McLean	1974	B.Mus.	Composer and producer	
Nathan Pacheco	2005	B.Mus.	Billboard Classical Albums chart-topping singer	
Janice Kapp Perry	1960	B.Mus.	Composer	
Deon Nielsen Price		B.A.	Collaborative pianist, classical composer, educator and writer; wrote the book Accompanying Skills for Pianists (1991)	
Carmen Rasmusen	—	(never graduated)	Country singer and songwriter; former American Idol contestant	
Dan Reynolds	—	(never graduated)	Lead singer for Grammy Award winners Imagine Dragons, recipient of the Songwriters Hall of Fame Hal David Starlight Award	
Lindsey Stirling	2015	B.S. (Marriott)	Billboard Music Award-winning and Emmy Award-nominated violinist	
Dan Truman	1984	B.A.	Keyboards/piano player for Grammy Award winners Diamond Rio	
Mack Wilberg	1979	B.Mus.	Music director, The Tabernacle Choir at Temple Square; composer and arranger	

== Religion ==
Note: All positions listed are within the Church of Jesus Christ of Latter-day Saints unless otherwise noted.

Name	Class year(s)	Degree(s)	Notability	Reference
Neil L. Andersen	1975	B.S.	Member of the Quorum of the Twelve Apostles	
Julie B. Beck	1973	B.S.	Fifteenth General Relief Society president	
David A. Bednar	1976	M.O.B. (Marriott)	Member of the Quorum of the Twelve Apostles	
Ezra Taft Benson	1926	B.S.	Thirteenth president of the Church	
D. Todd Christofferson	1969	B.A.	Member of the Quorum of the Twelve Apostles	
Mary N. Cook	1973; 1985	B.A. Ed.S.	Member of the Young Women General Presidency	
John B. Dickson	1968	B.S. (Marriott)	Member of the Second Quorum of the Seventy	
Emily Belle Freeman	—	(never graduated)	Sixteenth General Young Women president	
Clark G. Gilbert	1994	B.A.	Member of the Quorum of the Twelve Apostles	
Gerrit W. Gong	1977	B.A.	Member of the Quorum of the Twelve Apostles	
Bruce C. Hafen	1964	B.A.	Member of the First Quorum of the Seventy	
Jeffrey R. Holland	1965; 1966	B.A. M.A.	Member of the Quorum of the Twelve Apostles	
Jay E. Jensen	1967; 1974; 1988	B.A. M.A. Ed.D.	Member of the Presidency of the Seventy	
Marlin K. Jensen		B.S.	General authority and Church Historian and Recorder	
Ardeth G. Kapp	1964	M.Ed.	Ninth Young Women General President	
Thomas S. Monson	1974; 1981	MBA (Marriott); Hon. D.L.	Sixteenth president of the Church	
Stephen D. Nadauld	1968	B.S.	Former member of the Second Quorum of the Seventy	
Dallin H. Oaks	1954	B.A.	Eighteenth president of the Church	
Russell T. Osguthorpe	1971; 1973; 1975	B.A. M.A. Ph.D.	Sunday School general president	
Boyd K. Packer	1962	Ed.D.	Former president of the Quorum of the Twelve Apostles	
Reed Smoot	1879	B.A.	Former member of the Quorum of the Twelve Apostles	
Belle Spafford	1920	B.A.	Ninth General Relief Society President	
Bradley R. Wilcox	1985	B.S. M.Ed.	Religious speaker and author	

== Social reforms ==
Name	Class year(s)	Degree(s)	Notability	Reference
Randy Thorsteinson		(never graduated)	Former leader of the Alberta Alliance Party; former leader of Social Credit Party of Alberta	

== Sports ==
=== Baseball ===
Name	Class year(s)	Degree(s)	Notability	Reference
Rick Aguilera	1983	B.A.	Former pitcher for four MLB teams, winner of 1986 and 1991 World Series, three-time All-Star	
Danny Ainge	1981	B.A.	Former second baseman for MLB's Toronto Blue Jays and CEO of Utah Jazz	
Jeremy Guthrie	—	(transferred to Stanford before graduating)	Former pitcher for five MLB teams, participant in 2014 World Series	
Ken Hunt	1983	B.S.	Former pitcher for MLB's Cincinnati Reds, participant in 1961 World Series	
Wally Joyner	1984	B.A.	Former first baseman for five MLB teams, 1986 All-Star, and hitting coach for the Detroit Tigers	
Jack Morris	1976	B.A.	Former pitcher for five MLB teams; winner of the 1984, 1991 (MVP), 1992, and 1993 World Series; five-time All-Star	
Cory Snyder	1986	B.A.	Former outfielder for five MLB teams, 1984 Olympic silver medalist	
Kevin Towers	1982	B.A.	Former general manager of the San Diego Padres and Arizona Diamondbacks	

=== Basketball ===
Name	Class year(s)	Degree(s)	Notability	Reference
Danny Ainge	1981	B.A.	CEO of NBA's Utah Jazz; former general manager of NBA's Boston Celtics; head coach for NBA's Phoenix Suns and shooting guard for four NBA teams; winner of 1984 and 1986 NBA Finals; John R. Wooden Award winner	
Ambrosia Anderson	2006	B.S.	Forward for European Women league's Siemens (Greece); former player for two WNBA teams	
Rafael Araújo	2004	B.S.	Center for Clube de Regatas do Flamengo in Brazil; former player on two NBA teams	
Frank Bartley	—	(never graduated)	Basketball player for Ironi Ness Ziona of the Israeli Basketball Premier League	
Shawn Bradley	1993	B.A.	Former center for three NBA teams; former player on Germany national basketball team	
Elijah Bryant	2018	B.S.	Basketball player in the Israeli Basketball Premier League	
Krešimir Ćosić	1973	B.S.	Former center and head coach in European basketball leagues; three-time Olympic medalist with Yugoslavia (Gold in 1980); named one of the 50 Greatest Euroleague Contributors; inductee to the Naismith Memorial, FIBA, and College Basketball Halls of Fame	
Devin Durrant	1984	B.S.	All-American forward at BYU in 1984, played professionally in the NBA and in Europe	
Jimmer Fredette	2011	B.A.	2011 national men's basketball college player of the year, with the Sacramento Kings, Chicago Bulls, New Orleans Pelicans, New York Knicks, San Antonio Spurs, and Shanghai Sharks; CBA International MVP (2017)	
Bernie Fryer	1972	B.S.	VP and director of officials for the NBA; former NBA referee for 28 seasons; former player for one ABA and two NBA teams	
Travis Hansen	2003	B.S.	Former player for NBA's Atlanta Hawks and in Real Madrid of Europe	
Greg Kite	1983	B.S.	Former center for six NBA teams, winner of 1984 and 1986 NBA Finals, commissioner of the Florida Basketball Association	
Dick Nemelka	1966	B.S.	Former ABA basketball player and All-American	
Fred Roberts	1982	B.S.	Former power forward for six NBA teams	
Michael Smith	1988	B.A.	All-American forward at BYU in 1988, played professionally in the NBA and Europe, television broadcaster for the Los Angeles Clippers	
Erin Thorn	2003	B.S.	Former guard in the WNBA	

=== Football ===
Name	Class year(s)	Degree(s)	Notability	Reference
Ziggy Ansah	2012	B.A.	Former defensive end for the NFL's Detroit Lions	
John Beck	2006	B.A.	Former quarterback for the NFL's Washington Redskins; former quarterback for the BC Lions of the Canadian Football League	
Brian Billick	2006	B.A.	Former head coach for the NFL's Baltimore Ravens, leading team to Super Bowl XXXV win in 2001	
Jason Buck	1986	B.A.	Former defensive lineman for the NFL's Cincinnati Bengals and Washington Redskins, winner of Super Bowl XXVI in 1992, winner of the Outland Trophy in 1986	
Ben Cahoon	1998	B.S.	Former slotback for the CFL's Montreal Alouettes, 2002 and 2003 CFL Most Outstanding Canadian, winner of 91st Grey Cup (2003–MVP), CFL all-time receptions leader	
Todd Christensen	1978	B.S.	Former tight end for the NFL's Oakland Raiders and New York Giants; winner of Super Bowl XV in 1981; former ESPN commentator for 23 years	
Austin Collie	—	(never graduated)	Former wide receiver for the NFL, 2009 AFC Champion	
Gary Crowton	1983	B.A.	Former head coach for BYU and Louisiana Tech University; former offensive coordinator for the University of Oregon, Louisiana State University, and the Chicago Bears	
Ryan Denney	2002	B.S.	Former defensive end for the NFL's Buffalo Bills	
Ty Detmer	1990	B.S.	Former quarterback for six NFL teams, 1990 Heisman Trophy winner	
LaVell Edwards	1978	Ed.D.	Former head coach for BYU, leading university to 1984 NCAA Division I-A national football championship; College Football Hall of Fame inductee	
Alani Fua	2014	B.S.	Linebacker for the NFL's Arizona Cardinals	
Kurt Gouveia	—	(never graduated)	Former linebacker for the NFL's Washington Redskins, winner of Super Bowl XXII and Super Bowl XXVI, linebacker coach for the Sacramento Mountain Lions	
Travis Hall	1995	B.S.	Defensive tackle for the NFL's San Francisco 49ers, winner of Super Bowl XXXIII in 1999, founder of ProSpot Fitness	
Chris Hoke	2001	B.A.	Former defensive tackle and Super Bowl XL winner	
Tom Holmoe	1983; 1995	B.S. M.S.	Former defensive end for the NFL's San Francisco 49ers where he won Super Bowls XIX, XXIII, and XXIX; former head coach for the University of California, Berkeley; athletic director at BYU	
Paul Howard	1972		Former offensive guard for the NFL's Denver Broncos	
Lee Johnson	1985	B.S.	Former punter for six NFL teams, played with Cincinnati Bengals in Super Bowl XXIII	
Doug Jolley	2002	B.A.	Former tight end for the NFL's Oakland Raiders, New York Jets and Tampa Bay Buccaneers	
Bronson Kaufusi	2016	B.A.	Defensive end for the NFL's Baltimore Ravens; Drafted in 2016 NFL draft 70th overall	
Brett Keisel	2001	B.A.	Defensive end for the NFL's Pittsburgh Steelers; Pro Bowl player in 2010, winner of Super Bowls XL and XLIII	
Mike Leach	1983	B.A.	former head coach at Texas Tech, Washington State and Mississippi State (died December 12, 2022)	
Chad Lewis	1997	B.A.	Former tight end, winner of Super Bowl XXXIV in 2000, three-time Pro Bowl selection	
Reno Mahe	2003	B.S.	Former running back for the NFL's Philadelphia Eagles, All-Pro selection in 2005	
Jason Mathews	1993	B.A.	Former offensive tackle for the NFL's Indianapolis Colts and Tennessee Titans	
Jim McMahon	2014	B.A.	Former quarterback for seven NFL teams, winner of Super Bowl's XX (1986) and XXXI (1997), Pro Bowl selection, Davey O'Brien Award winner	
Rob Morris	2000	B.A.	Former linebacker for the NFL's Indianapolis Colts, winner of Super Bowl XLI in 2007	
Bart Oates	1985	B.S. (Marriott)	Former center for the NFL's San Francisco 49ers, New York Giants, and Philadelphia/Baltimore Stars; led team to Super Bowl XXI win in 1986, Super Bowl XXV win in 1990, and Super Bowl XXIX win in 1994	
Orrin Olsen	1976	B.A.	Former center for the NFL's Kansas City Chiefs	
Dennis Patera	1968	B.S.	Former placekicker for the NFL's San Francisco 49ers	
Evan Pilgrim	1994	B.A.	Former offensive guard for the NFL's Chicago Bears, Tennessee Oilers, Atlanta Falcons and Denver Broncos, played in Super Bowl XXXIII in 1999	
Dennis Pitta	2009	B.A.	Starting tight end for the NFL's Baltimore Ravens, Super Bowl XLVII champion	
Andy Reid	1982; 1983	B.S. M.S.	Head coach of the NFL's Kansas City Chiefs; Super Bowl LIV, Super Bowl LVII, and Super Bowl LVIII champion, participant in Super Bowl XXXIX in 2004 with the Philadelphia Eagles, AP Coach of the Year in 2002	
Golden Richards	—	(never graduated)	Former wide receiver for the NFL's Dallas Cowboys, winner of Super Bowl XII in 1978	
Steve Sarkisian	1997	B.A.	Head coach at the University of Texas; former head coach at the University of Southern California and the University of Washington	
Vai Sikahema	2002	B.A.	Former kick returner for three NFL teams, two-time Pro Bowl selection	
Kalani Sitake	2000	B.A.	Head coach at the Brigham Young University	
Daniel Sorensen	—	(never graduated)	Safety for the NFL's Kansas City Chiefs; Super Bowl LIV and Super Bowl LVII champion	
John Tait	1999	B.S.	Former offensive tackle for the NFL's Chicago Bears	
Glen Titensor	1980	B.S.	Former offensive guard for the NFL's Dallas Cowboys	
Uani Unga	—	(never graduated)	Linebacker for the NFL's New York Giants	
Kyle Van Noy	2013	B.A.	Outside linebacker for the NFL's New England Patriots	
Fred Warner	2017	B.S.	Linebacker for the NFL's San Francisco 49ers	
Fred Whittingham	—	(never graduated)	Former defensive coordinator for the Oakland Raiders	
Kyle Whittingham	1984; 1987	B.S. M.A.	Head coach for the University of Michigan	
Jamaal Williams		B.S.	Running back for the NFL's Detroit Lions	
Marc Wilson	1980	B.S.	Quarterback for the NFL's Oakland Raiders, Green Bay Packers and New England Patriots; consensus All-American 1979	
Zach Wilson	—	(never graduated)	Quarterback for the NFL's New York Jets, Denver Broncos, and Miami Dolphins	
Steve Young	1983; 1994	B.A. J.D. (Clark)	Former quarterback for the NFL and USFL; winner of Super Bowls XXIII (1989), XXIV (1990), and XXIX (1995–MVP); seven-time Pro Bowl selection; Davey O'Brien Award winner; Pro and College Football Hall of Fame inductee	

=== Track and field ===
Name	Class year(s)	Degree(s)	Notability	Reference
Ed Eyestone	1985; 1990	B.S. M.S.	Marathon runner for the United States in the 1988 and 1992 Summer Olympics; former head coach for BYU cross-country team	
Frankie Fredericks	1987	B.A.	Namibian sprinter and four-time Olympic silver medalist	
Tiffany Lott-Hogan	1998	B.S.	World record holder in the 55-meter hurdles	
Henry Marsh	1978	B.A.	Long-distance runner for the United States and three-time Olympian	
Leonard Myles-Mills	1999	B.A.	Sprinter for Ghana in the 2004 Summer Olympics	
Doug Padilla	1983	B.S.	Long-distance runner for the United States in the 1984 Summer Olympics	
Adaobi Tabugbo	2021		Competes in competes in hurdling 60-meter and 100-meter events internationally for Nigeria	
Jared Ward	2015	B.S. M.S.	Long-distance runner, multiple-time national champion, and qualifier for 2016 Olympics in the marathon	

=== Soccer ===
Name	Class year(s)	Degree(s)	Notability	Reference
Mikayla Cluff	2021	B.S.	Professional soccer player for Utah Royals, National Women's Soccer League	
Aleisha Cramer	2005	B.S.	Former USWNT player	
Lindsi Lisonbee Cutshall	2012	B.S.	Professional soccer player for Sky Blue FC, National Women's Soccer League	
Nádia Gomes	2017		Former professional soccer player for NWSL Orlando Pride, Portugal women's national football team player	
Ashley Hatch	2016		Professional soccer player for NWSL Washington Spirit, USWNT player	
Katie Larkin	2009	B.S	Former professional soccer player for WPS team the Atlanta Beat	
Shauna Rohbock	1999	B.S.	Bobsled silver medalist at 2006 Winter Olympics, former professional soccer player for WUSA's San Diego Spirit	
Cameron Tucker	2021		Professional soccer player for NWSL Utah Royals	
Michele Vasconcelos	2016		Professional soccer player for NWSL Chicago Red Stars	

=== Other sports ===
Name	Class year(s)	Degree(s)	Notability	Reference
Earl Bascom	1940	B.A.	Professional rodeo cowboy, world record holder, Cowboy Hall of Fame inductee	
Werner Hoeger	1978	Ed.D.	Olympic luge athlete, 2002 Winter Olympics, 2006 Winter Olympics	
Casey Jennings	2000	B.S.	Professional beach volleyball player, four-time AVP champion	
Arielle Martin	2007	B.S.	Professional BMX rider	
Travis Marx	—	(never graduated)	3rd in NJCAA for wrestling; mixed martial artist	
Hugh McCutcheon	1993; 1998; 1999	B.S. M.S. EMBA (Marriott)	Head coach of USA men's volleyball team	
Johnny Miller	1969	B.A.	Former professional golfer; winner of 1973 U.S. Open, 1976 Open Championship	
Ed Parker	1956	B.A.	Founder of American Kenpo karate and 10th degree black belt	
Ken Patera	1987	B.S.	Former professional wrestler and Olympic weightlifter	
Jean Saubert	1967	MRE	U.S. alpine skier, won silver and bronze medals at the 1964 Winter Olympics	
Chael Sonnen	—	(attended)	Professional mixed martial artist competing for Bellator MMA and Ultimate Fighting Championship	
Mike Weir	1992	B.S.	Professional golfer; winner of 2003 Masters Tournament and Lou Marsh Trophy	

== Other ==
Name	Class year(s)	Degree(s)	Notability	Reference
Tim Ballard	1998	B.A.	Anti-human trafficking activist and author and subject of film Sound of Freedom	
Dave Crenshaw	2000	B.S. (Marriott)	Writer and speaker	
Avraham Gileadi	1975; 1977; 1981	B.A. M.A. Ph.D.	Writer on Book of Isaiah; member of the September Six	
Sharlene Wells Hawkes	1988	B.A.	Miss America 1985, ESPN sportscaster	
Soben Huon	2006	B.S.	Miss Utah USA 2006	
Colleen Kay Hutchins	1947	B.A.	Miss America 1952	
Natalie Camille Johnson	2002	B.S. (Marriott)	Miss Utah 2002	
Jaime Augusto Mayol	1975	B.A.	Manhunt International 2006 winner	
Trevor Packer	1998; 2000	B.A. M.A.	Head of the Advanced Placement program at the College Board	
Katie Ann Powell	2022	B.A.	Miss District of Columbia 2024	
Mark Rober	2004	B.S.	YouTube personality, founder of CrunchLabs, and former mechanical engineer for NASA and Apple Inc.	
Elizabeth Smart	2010	B.Mus.	Victim of kidnapping; political activist; NY Times bestselling author	

=== Fictional people ===
Name	Notability	Reference
Mallory Book	Marvel Comics character, head of She-Hulk's law firm	
Jeffrey Cole	Fellowship applicant in the TV series House, played by Edi Gathegi	
Jonathon Jordan	Main character in The Singles Ward, played by Will Swenson	

== See also ==
- List of Brigham Young University faculty

== Notes ==
- Blank cells indicate missing information; em-dashes (—) indicate that the alumnus attended but never graduated from BYU.
