= List of Brigham Young University faculty =

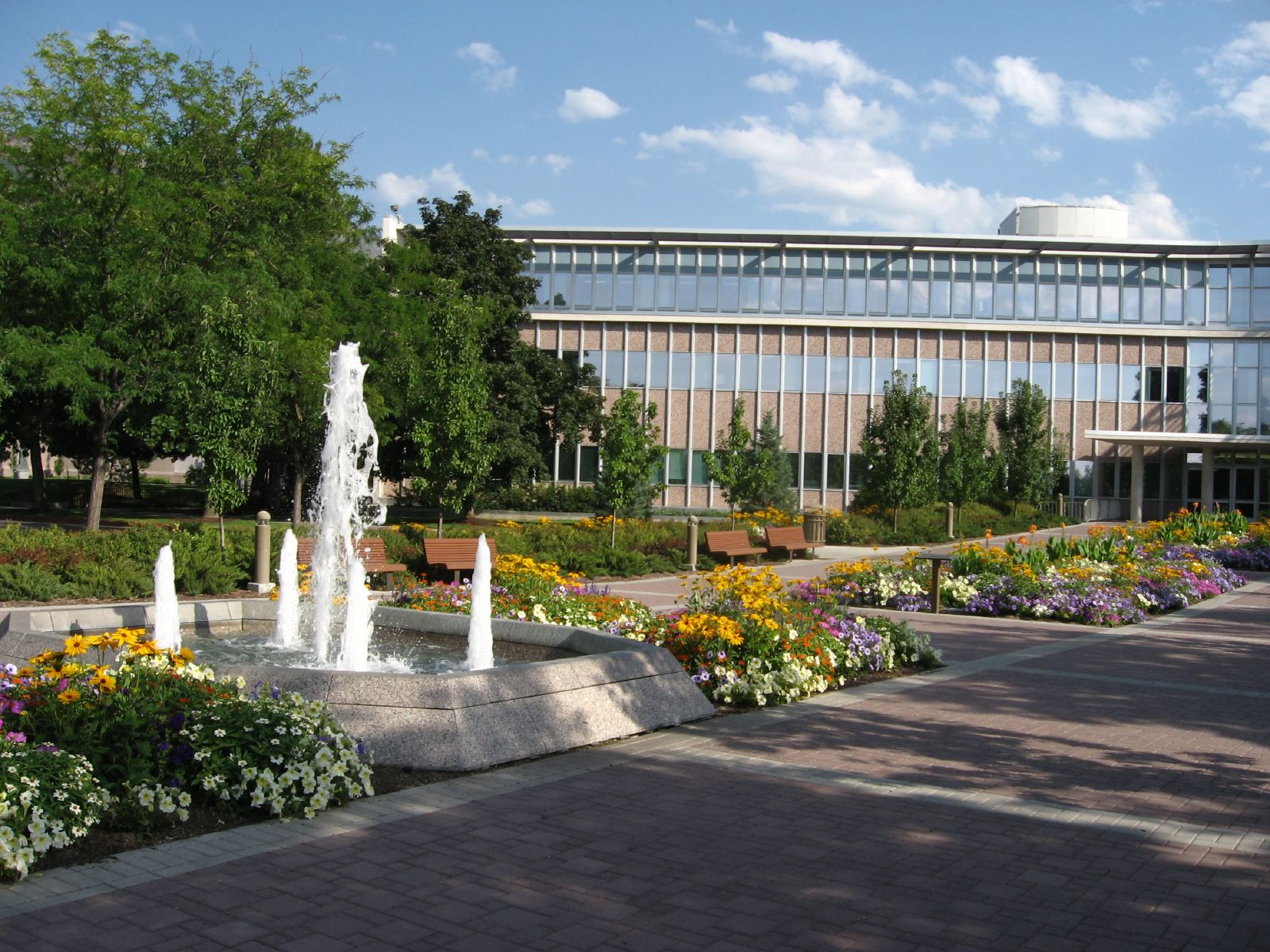
Smoot Administration Building on the BYU campus

This list of Brigham Young University faculty includes notable current and former instructors and administrators of Brigham Young University (BYU), a private, coeducational research university owned by the Church of Jesus Christ of Latter-day Saints and located in Provo, Utah, United States. It includes faculty at its related academic colleges and two schools, including the Marriott School of Management and the J. Reuben Clark Law School. As of the fall of 2007, BYU employed 1,300 instructional faculty, 88% of whom were tenured or on tenure track, and approximately 2,900 administrative and staff personnel. Part-time employees included approximately 900 faculty, administrative and staff personnel and 12,000 students.

== College of Engineering ==
Name	Department	Service	Notability	Alumnus	Reference
Randal Beard	Electrical and Computer Engineering	1996–present	Guidance and control of unmanned aerial vehicles	No	
L. Douglas Smoot	Chemical Engineering	1960–1995	Noted for work fossil fuels and energy; led restoration of Brigham Young Academy building	Yes	

== College of Family, Home and Social Sciences ==
Name	Department	Service	Notability	Alumnus	Reference
Mark Choate	History	2001–present	Bronze Star recipient for his handbook on village stability operations in Afghanistan, 2010–2011	No	
William Hamblin	History				

== College of Fine Arts and Communications ==
Name	Department	Service	Notability	Alumnus	Reference
James C. Christensen	Visual Arts		Fantasy painter	Yes	

== College of Humanities ==
Name	Department	Service	Notability	Alumnus	Reference
James E. Faulconer	Philosophy	1975–present	Philosopher; founding editor of Epoché: A Journal for the History of Philosophy; columnist for Patheos	Yes	
Kimberly Johnson	English		Poet	No	
Brandon Sanderson	English	2005–present	Fantasy author	Yes	
Dave Wolverton	English		Science-fiction author	No	

== College of Life Sciences ==
Name	Department	Service	Notability	Alumnus	Reference
Ralph Vary Chamberlin	Biology	1908–1911	Prolific taxonomist, central to the 1911 modernism controversy	No	
John S. K. Kauwe III	Biology	2008–2020	President of Brigham Young University–Hawaii	Yes	

== College of Physical and Mathematical Sciences ==
Name	Department	Service	Notability	Alumnus	Reference
Alan Ashton	Computer Science	1987	Co-founder of WordPerfect, founder of Thanksgiving Point		

== College of Religious Education ==
Name	Department	Service	Notability	Alumnus	Reference
Randy L. Bott	Religion		Author and highest-rated professor in America in 2008 at Ratemyprofessor.com	Yes	
Hugh B. Brown	Religion		Author and former member of the First Presidency of the Church of Jesus Christ of Latter-day Saints	No	
Truman G. Madsen	Philosophy		Prolific LDS author, former director of BYU Jerusalem Center	No	

== J. Reuben Clark School of Law ==
Name	Department	Service	Notability	Alumnus	Reference
Dee Benson	Law	1996	Federal judge of the Foreign Intelligence Surveillance Court	Yes	
Larry Echo Hawk	Law	1995–present	Former attorney general for Idaho	Yes	
Gordon Gee	Law	1979	President of Ohio State University, former president of Brown University	No	
Bruce C. Hafen	Law	1985–1989	Former president of Ricks College, Emeritus General Authority of The Church of Jesus Christ of Latter-day Saints	No	
David Nuffer	Law	2001–present	Federal judge of the United States District Court for the District of Utah	Yes	
Dale A. Whitman	Law	1973–1978, 1989–1999	Former dean of the University of Missouri School of Law, former president of the Association of American Law Schools	Yes	

== Marriott School of Management ==
Name	Department	Service	Notability	Alumnus	Reference
W. Steve Albrecht	Accounting		Former president of the American Accounting Association, former (and first) president of the Association of Certified Fraud Examiners	Yes	
Stephen Covey	Organizational Leadership & Strategy		Author of New York Times Best Seller The Seven Habits of Highly Effective People; one of Time magazine's Top 25 most influential Americans	Yes	
Stephen D. Nadauld	Management (Finance)	1976–1983	Ninth president of Weber State University, 17th president of Dixie State College, former director of BYU's MBA program	Yes	

== McKay School of Education ==
Name	Department	Service	Notability	Alumnus	Reference
Bonnie Brinton	Communication Disorders	1994–present	Language disorders researcher	No	

== See also ==
- List of presidents of Brigham Young University
- List of Brigham Young University alumni
