= Belbin =

Belbin may refer to:

== People ==
- David Belbin (born 1958), British novelist and academic
- Meredith Belbin (1926–2025), British researcher and academic
- Susan Belbin (born 1948), British television director and producer
- Tanith Belbin (born 1984), Canadian-American ice-dancer
- Tracey Belbin (born 1967), Australian field hockey player

== Other uses ==
- Belbin Team Inventory, a form of psychometric testing
