= Shaper (disambiguation) =

Shaper may refer to:

- Shaper, a metalworking tool
- Wood shaper, a woodworking tool
- Shaper (surfboard), a person who makes surfboards
- Waveshaper, an audio process
- Shaper, one of the roles in the Belbin Team Role Inventories
- A digital circuit or program which performs traffic shaping
