= Sabre Corporate Team Development =

Sabre Corporate Team Development is an Australian team building and corporate development company that was formed in 1988. They provide a variety of business group-dynamic games, events and simulations so that teams can learn through experience how to work together. They began with military themed events and now offer a wide range of themed events including film making, fashion, music, and painting.

Sabre has developed within the Australian meetings and convention industry, and the human resource development field. They list many major multi-national clients with their head office in the Gold Coast, Australia, an office in Sydney Australia and in the United States. In 2006, Sabre was a finalist in the Queensland Tourism Awards (in the Meetings and Tourism category.) In 2008, they formed "Esprit De Corps ‐ Corporate Events" in the US in partnership with Warriors Inc, managed by Captain Dale Dye.

Sabre claim to have pioneered team development approaches blending theoretical underpinnings with themed frameworks that are matched to physical activity components (with Dryll Management Development), and use conventional models such as Belbin, Myers Briggs, DISC when team role profiling. Their article "Why Experiential Learning is so Effective" expands to 12 points research by Luckner and Nadler 1997 (corporate psychologists), and is cited by several websites.

== See also ==
- Team development
- Team work
