= Star Roles Model =

The Star Roles Model is used by organisations to describe the positions managers and mentors adopt when guiding direct-reports and mentees. The concept builds on the Group Roles model developed by Benne & Sheats, taking a short-cut route to describing preferences when guiding others. Similarly, the Roles Model follows the Mintzberg 10 management positions - drawing in the most relevant elements when considering the mentoring relationship in detail.

The model describes six roles, which are split into two areas of focus - Inner and Outer. The roles are neutral in representation - reflecting a preference in relation to giving guidance and support, rather than presenting a pyramidal of approaches that work towards an ideal. In use, the roles are used by individuals to recognise where their preference sits, and what the person / situation requires. In this respect, the model supports the situational leadership theory concept. Practically, managers are encouraged to use the model to critically review what is required through a close mentoring relationship, to spot when the relationship becomes less effective because of over reliance on one role, and which role to use to achieve the most effective approach.

The grouping of the roles is based on the concept of Introversion / Extraversion - acknowledging that some individuals will naturally prefer an inwardly focusing role, over an external bias. The Model makes no concrete link between MBTI profiling and preference on the E-I scale and a preference on the Star Model.

== 'Inner' Roles ==
=== 'Inner' Guidance ===
The inner roles focus on 'closed' management and mentoring, where the mentor is using personal knowledge, insight and input to steer the individual. Whilst not solidly linked to Introversion, the notion of self-interest, focus and bias aptly describes the drivers around guiding through this position. Whilst the dialogue is driven through the inner aspects of the role, the focus from the mentor is not on the 'I' - and can be a third person approach. Positives for this role are found in the depth of individual approach, the supportive and individual nature of the mentoring relationship and the value such an approach draws from the time being given over by the manager. The Inner approach does tend towards an 'opt out' from the mentor, in that they bring little of themselves to the conversation, and can work 'at a distance' to the challenge.

=== The Roles ===
- Greater Expert - bringing in own knowledge and sharing this with the person being guided/mentored - having the comfort and knowledge to advise technically, procedurally and personally - based on experience and sourced knowledge
- Critical Partner - brings personal challenge and structured dialogue to the interaction relies on socratic questioning to help the other person realise the truth of the situation and challenge their thinking with the aim of expanding the dialogue and their sphere of consideration.
- Sympathetic Ear - provides a non-judgmental sounding board for the mentee to discuss issues and challenges - establishes a secure conversational environment and falls into the 'friend/confidant role

== 'Outer' Roles ==
=== 'Outer' Guidance ===
In comparison, the outer roles are driven more by a sense of 'open' input, that seeks to bring in contextual experimentation, relational aspects, and wider links to the outside world. This 'extroverted' approach relies more on the mentor bringing in the 'I' and making value-based judgments on what is and isn't required. Positively, these roles are highly effective at supporting others through cultural and behavioral challenges, and giving a valid platform for personal input and demonstration from the mentor. When adopting these roles, managers have to be observant against a tendency to place too much emphasis on self-opinion rather than fact, and for them to take ownership of the problem/challenge being discussed, rather than coach the person through the issue.

=== The Roles ===
- Background Champion - works within the organisation to secure wider support, input or change to assist the mentee in achieving their aims - lends their name and weight to the issue and is happy to be quoted as support for the work
- Role Model - bases conversations around challenge on their own direct experience and personal approach to problems - gives mentees steer through "I would..." conversations that educate through replication of their own success rather than self exploration and learning
- Cultural Navigator - imparts detailed, personal knowledge of the cultural flows and key figures within the organisation - uses personal experience and opinion of individuals, teams and departments to shape a route through the challenge for the individual

== Application ==
The Star Model supports two aspects of mentor / leadership training:

Awareness of preference - used to explore their likely preference, conversations driven by the Roles can lead to a stronger awareness of how their individual leadership tends to manifest practically. Following on from this recognition, leaders use the model to better plan interventions with individuals, and to ensure the correct approach to Crucial Conversations with the aim of achieving appropriate outcomes, rather than positive conversations.

Situational approach - using the Roles to analyze what a particular support / mentoring situation requires in relation to a successful outcome - challenging a 'matching' of the mentee's requirement against what the mentor truly believes is required. For example, a mentee may be looking for a 'sympathetic ear', to vent their frustration at, whereas the situation requires the mentor to take a 'critical partner' and 'role model' approach to move the situation forward

In making the roles overt and labeling them, both parties are able to work towards positions within the relationship that best support effective outcomes and agree levels of challenge and input that educate, support and demonstrate appropriately.
