= University of International Golden Indonesia =

University in Jakarta, Indonesia

- Universitas IGI
- Seal of IGI
- Type: Private coeducational
- Established: 1983
- President: John W. Limbong
- Faculty: 52
- Students: 2,500
- Location: Jakarta, Indonesia
- Nickname: IGI
- Website: http://www.igi.ac.id/

The University of International Golden Indonesia (IGI) is an institution of higher learning located in Jakarta, Indonesia. Founded in 1983 by John W. Limbong, the university follows the standards prescribed in the Honor Code of the United States's Brigham Young University, although IGI has no official affiliation with the latter school. IGI is run under the auspices of the non-profit organization Golden Nusantara Foundation.

IGI offers seven areas of study, including Economics, Technology, Law, Communications, Linguistics, Medicine, Education, and Psychology.
