= L. Douglas Smoot =

American chemical engineer (1934–2020)

Dr. L. Douglas Smoot
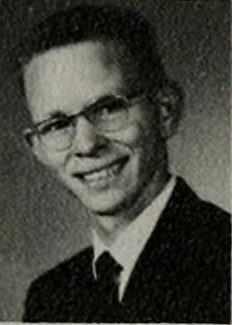
- Smoot in his freshman year at BYU
- Born: Leon Douglas Smoot; July 26, 1934; Provo, Utah, US
- Died: January 13, 2020 (aged 85)
- Education: Brigham Young University, B.S. (1957); University of Washington, M.S. (1958), Ph.D. (1960)
- Spouse: Marian Bird (m. 1953)
- Children: 4
- Scientific career
- Fields: Chemical engineering, aerospace/rocket propulsion, fossil fuels and energy
- Institutions: Brigham Young University

Leon Douglas Smoot (July 26, 1934 – January 13, 2020) was an American chemical engineering professor and researcher. He was most noted for his work in aerospace and rocket propulsion and later his work on fossil fuels and energy. Smoot worked in various capacities at Brigham Young University for over 35 years, and consulted with over sixty companies and agencies for energy and combustion throughout the United States and Europe. He was a member of American Institute of Chemical Engineers, American Society for Engineering Education, The Combustion Institute, and National Fire Protection Association and authored or co-authored over 200 articles and 4 books on the topic on energy and propulsion.

== Personal and family life ==
Leon Douglas Smoot was born on July 26, 1934, to Douglas P. and Jennie (Hallam) Smoot. He was born in Provo, Utah but he and his family moved to Springville, Utah in 1941. He grew up in Springville as the youngest of three children and graduated from Springville High School in 1952. Smoot received a basketball scholarship to Brigham Young University (BYU) and enrolled there in the fall of 1952. Smoot married his high school sweetheart Marian Bird on September 15, 1953. The couple had four children, Analee, LaCinda, Michelle, and Mindy.

Smoot died on January 13, 2020.

== Academic career ==
Smoot was a student at BYU for five years and majored in chemical engineering. Although originally there on a basketball scholarship, Smoot received many academic honors and awards during his time at BYU. Some of these include, a chemistry scholarship from Kennecott Copper Corporation in 1955, becoming president of the Chemical Engineers Society in 1956, and receiving the General Contractors of Utah Scholarship. Smoot was also listed on the honor roll several times in his undergraduate academic career. He graduated with high honors in 1957.

In 1958 Smoot began his schooling at the University of Washington. He received his master's degree in 1958 and a Ph.D. in 1960, both in chemical engineering. Smoot had a research fellowship while at Washington, and worked as a teaching assistant and as a research engineer at Phillips Petroleum Company.

== Teaching career ==
After receiving his Ph.D., Smoot was offered and accepted a position as an assistant professor of chemical engineering at BYU. He remained at BYU for three years, after which he taught at the California Institute of Technology as a visiting assistant professor. While in California, Smoot was also a senior technical specialist for the Lockheed Propulsion Company. and in 1966 was made president of The Scientific Research Society of America (RESA).

Smoot returned to BYU in 1967 and was named chairman of the chemical engineering department in 1970. Smoot's research and work was extensive in his early years of teaching at BYU. He participated in multiple scientific conferences, including a three-nation scientific conference in Washington D.C. in 1968 (of which he was one of only ten delegates from the United States). Smoot served as the chemical engineering department chairman from 1970 to 1977. His time as department chairman is marked by a number of important research projects and accomplishments. The department received numerous grants, including a contract for research in rocket propulsion in 1971 amounting to $71,000. Also in 1971 BYU acquired and assembled a high-speed wind tunnel test facility – a project spearheaded by Smoot and John Simonsen, chairman of the mechanical engineering department. The wind tunnel was acquired from a closed Navy Laboratory and was sold to BYU partially because it was to assist Smoot in his rocket propulsion research being conducted for the Navy.

During the early 1970s, Smoot directed his research focus away from aerospace and rocket propulsion to fossil fuels and energy; one result being that the number of grants and research contracts for coal combustion and air pollution grew tremendously. In 1976 BYU's Chemical Engineering Department ranked fourth in the nation in terms of monetary awards, receiving over $655,000, for research grants. Grants for which Smoot was named the primary researcher included the Electric Power Research Institute Grant in 1974, the Office of Coal Research and Gasification grant (1975), and the United States Bureau of Mines Grant to prevention coal mine fires (1976).

== Civic work and legacy ==
Despite his extensive work both at BYU and the private sector, Smoot was actively involved in his community, especially with environmental matters. In 1970 he was selected to represent the United States Department of Defense at the Technical Tripartite Cooperative Program Conference in London. He was also invited and served as a member of the Plume Emissions Panel for the National Academy of Sciences in the fall of 1972.

Smoot was also very involved at the local level. He served as chairman of the Oak Hills Action Committee from 1972 to 1973, often advised local officials such as the Springville Chamber of Commerce and the city of Provo on issues such as air pollution, and held public seminars and discourses on environmental issues.

In the Provo Community, Smoot was known for his role in the restoration of the Brigham Young Academy building. Beginning in 1995, Smoot led the initial evaluation effort to preserve the building, which had been closed in 1968. Smoot worked with the Provo Library Board and the Provo City Council, encouraging them to consider restoring the building as a library. Over the next year, Smoot and the Brigham Young Academy Foundation (BYAF) raised over $70,000 to begin an evaluation study of the building. Over the next five years, Smoot dedicated over 7,000 hours to the effort to transform the Brigham Young Academy building into the Provo City Library. With other leaders, Smoot promoted and helped pass a citizens bond election to finance the new city library. With his help, the BYAF and the community of Provo raised the remaining $6 million needed to complete the project. Because of his efforts, Smoot was called "the man who saved Academy Square." On October 17, 2008, the Mormon Historic Sites Foundation awarded Smoot the Junius F. Wells award for his leadership in restoring the Brigham Young Academy building.

== Works ==
During his professional career, Smoot authored or co-authored four books, six book chapters, 15 technical reviews, 88 peer-reviewed publications, and 125 conference manuscripts. Most of these publications deal with properties and combustion of fossil fuels:

- Smoot, L.D., editor and co-author, Fundamentals of Coal Combustion, Elsevier, The Netherlands, 1993 (book).
- Smith, K.L., L.D. Smoot, T.H. Fletcher, and R.J. Pugmire, The Structure and Reaction Processes of Coal, Plenum, New York, 1994 (book).
- Smoot, L.D., "The Role of Research In the Fossil Energy Industry," Energy and Fuels, 7:689–703 (1993).
- Smoot, L.D., R.D. Boardman, B.S. Brewster, S.C. Hill, and A. Foli, "Development and Application of an Acid Rain Precursor Model for Practical Furnaces," Energy and Fuels, 7:686–695 (1993).
- Hill, S.C., and L.D. Smoot, "A Comprehensive 3-D Model for Simulation of Combustion Systems," Energy and Fuels, 7:874–883 (1993).
- Hobbs, M.L., P.T. Radulovic, and L.D. Smoot, "Combustion and Gasification of Coals In Fixed Beds," Progress In Energy and Combustion Science, 19:505–586 (1993) (review paper).
- Boardman, R.D., C.N. Eatough, G.J. Germane, and L.D. Smoot, "Comparison of Measurements and Predictions of Flame Structure and Thermal NOx In a Swirling, Natural Gas Diffusion Flame," Combustion Science and Technology, 93:193–210 (1993).
- Blackham, A.U., L.D. Smoot, and P. Yousefi, "Rates of mm-sized Coal Particle Oxidation: 1. Simple Experiments," Fuel, 73:601–612 (1993).
- Brewster, B.S., L.D. Smoot, P.R. Solomon, and J.R. Markham, "Structure of a Near-Laminar Coal-Jet Flame," Energy and Fuels, 7:684–690 (1993).
- Bisio, A., and S.G. Boots, Encyclopedia of Energy Technology and the Environment, (A) L.D. Smoot, Coal Combustion, (B) L.D. Smoot, Coal Gasification, (C) L.D. Smoot and S.K. Kramer, Combustion Modeling, First Edition (Four Volumes), Wiley-Interscience, New York, In press, 1995 (book).
