= My Turn on Earth =

- Music: Lex de Azevedo
- Book: Carol Lynn Pearson
- Setting: Heaven
- Premiere: 1977

My Turn on Earth is a Latter Day Saints musical written by Carol Lynn Pearson with music by Lex de Azevedo. The show premiered in 1977 and became widely popular, ranking with the other popular musical Saturday's Warrior. A storybook adapted from the musical was also released that same year. A VHS version of a recorded stage production was released in 1986 in memory of Fay. The first DVD version (Original Cast Edition) was distributed worldwide through the Deseret Book Company in June 2008.

== Plot ==
My Turn on Earth recounts the Church of Jesus Christ of Latter Day Saints' Plan of Salvation. Barbara and her four friends are living in Heaven (the pre-existence). While there, they re-enact the War in Heaven and the shouts for joy of the spirits that are going to be born. They treat mortality as a treasure hunt with returning again to live with Heavenly Father and Mother as the greatest prize to be won. In the end, Barbara returns to Heaven, having learned the necessary lessons, and won treasure of all, Love.

== Songs ==
- Once Upon A Time
- Heaven
- I Have A Plan
- Shout For Joy
- My Turn on Earth
- Everybody Ought to have a Body
- Choosing
- My Story
- The Golden Rule
- Look for the Little Light
- Opposition
- Homesick (not in 1986 recorded stage production)
- Where on Earth Can I Find Heaven
- It Isn't Good to Be Alone/Eternity Is You
- Angel Lullaby
- What Does it Take to Make a Family
- I'm Not Ready
- Forever
- My Turn on Earth Finale

The rights to these songs, and to the musical as a whole are currently owned by Excel Entertainment Group.
