= Carol Lynn Pearson =

American Mormon writer (1939–2026)

- Born: Carol Lynn Wright; September 27, 1939; Rexburg, Idaho, U.S.
- Died: July 29, 2026 (aged 86); Oakland, California, U.S.
- Education: Brigham Young University (MA, theatre)
- Occupations: Poet, playwright, novelist, social critic
- Spouse: Gerald Neils Pearson (m. 1966; div. 1978)
- Children: 4
- Website: carollynnpearson.com

Carol Lynn Wright Pearson (September 27, 1939 – July 29, 2026) was an American poet, author, screenwriter, and playwright. She frequently addressed the topics of LGBT acceptance and the role of Latter-day Saint women.

== Background ==
A fourth-generation member of the Church of Jesus Christ of Latter-day Saints (LDS Church), Pearson was born in Salt Lake City, Utah to Lelland Rider Wright and Emeline Sirrine Wright. They would settle in Provo, where Pearson attended Brigham Young High School. Her mother died of breast cancer when Carol Lynn was fifteen. Carol Lynn studied music and theater at Brigham Young University (BYU), where she won the award for Best Actress two years in a row.

Pearson married actor, musician, and songwriter Gerald Neils Pearson (1942–1984), who she met in a college production of The Skin of Our Teeth, on September 9, 1966 in Salt Lake City. The two were Latter-day Saints who both descended from several generations of church members. They were married for 12 years and had four children together, settling in Provo, Utah.

While they were engaged, Gerald told Carol Lynn that he had participated in sexual relationships with men, but had left that phase of his life behind. LDS Church authorities also assured the couple that marriage would turn Gerald into a heterosexual. However, he eventually confronted his homosexuality and after a move to California prompted by his desire to explore this side of himself, they separated and were divorced in 1978. He returned to live with her and their children after being diagnosed with AIDS in 1984, and she cared for him until his death. Her book Goodbye, I Love You is about their life together.

Following that, Pearson became an unofficial spokesperson for acceptance of gay people by their Latter-day Saint families, as well as a stronger leadership role for women in the broader LDS Church community. Many of her works addressed these issues, and she would speak on these and related subjects around the country. She shared, "I love the Mormon community ... and I have a unique opportunity to build bridges."

Pearson's daughter, Emily (born 1968), is an actress and writer who is the author of Dancing With Crazy (2011), a memoir of her life and family. Pearson's elder son, John (b. 1969), is a professional caricaturist and one of the original animators of The Simpsons; younger son, Aaron (born 1971), is a rock musician. Her youngest child, Katharine Sirrine "Katy" Pearson Adams (1975–1999), died of a brain tumor at the age of 23.

Pearson died on July 29, 2026, at the age of 86.

== Works ==
Pearson was best known for her memoir Goodbye, I Love You and the Latter-day Saint musical My Turn on Earth. Her play Facing East, about a Latter-day Saint family dealing with the suicide of a gay son, opened Off Broadway on May 29, 2007. She also wrote One On The Seesaw, a lighthearted book about raising a family as a single parent.

Early in her career she published poetry and essays in various venues. Her plays Pegora the Witch and Think Your Way to a Million won statewide contests in Utah; a third, Martyr-in-Waiting, was published by the LDS Church's Mutual Improvement Association. She was employed at this time by BYU's motion-picture department. Her first book was the poetry collection, Beginnings, published in 1969. Her other works include:

- The Search (1970)
- The Order is Love (1971)
- Daughters of Light (1973)
- Cipher in the Snow (screenplay) 1973
- The Growing Season (1976)
- The Flight and the Nest (1977)
- A Widening View (1983)
- Blow Out the Wishbone (1985)
- Goodbye, I Love You: The Story of a Wife, Her Homosexual Husband, and a Love Honored For Time And All Eternity (1987) ISBN 1-55517-984-3
- Lasting Peace (1990)
- Mother Wove the Morning (1992)
- Women I Have Known and Been (1993)
- Picture Windows: A Carol Lynn Pearson Collection (1996)
- Morning Glory Mother (1997)
- The Lesson: A Fable For Our Times (1998)
- What Love Is (1999)
- Fuzzy Red Bathrobe: Questions From the Heart For Mothers and Daughters (2000)
- Girlfriend, You Are the Best! (2001)
- Day-Old Child And Other Celebrations of Motherhood (2001)
- Will You Still Be My Daughter? A Fable For Our Times (2001)
- A Strong Man: A Fable For Our Times (2001)
- The Gift: A Fable For Our Times (2001)
- Consider the Butterfly: Transforming Your Life Through Meaningful Coincidence (2002)
- A Christmas Thief (2003) ISBN 978-1-59955-184-5
- The Modern Magi (2003)
- The Christmas Moment (2005) ISBN 1-55517-869-3
- Beginnings and Beyond (2005) ISBN 1-55517-870-7
- The Model Mormon Mother's Notebook (2005) ISBN 1-55517-858-8
- The Runaway Mother (2006) ISBN 1-55517-927-4
- A Stranger For Christmas (2007) ISBN 978-1-59955-088-6
- In Love Again and Always: Love Poems by Carol Lynn Pearson (2007) ISBN 978-1-59955-042-8
- The Dance (2007) ISBN 978-1-59955-097-8
- Summer of Truth (2007) ISBN 978-1-59955-046-6
- No More Goodbyes: Circling the Wagons Around Our Gay Loved Ones (2007)
- Priceless Moments: Snapshots of Motherhood (2008) ISBN 9781599551425
- The Sweet, Still Waters of Home: Inspiration for Mothers from the twenty-third Psalm (2011) ISBN 978-1-59955-802-8
- The Ghost of Eternal Polygamy: Haunting the Hearts and Heaven of Mormon Women and Men (2016)
- I'll Walk With You (2020) ISBN 978-1423653950
- Finding Mother God: Poems to Heal the World (2020) ISBN 978-1423656685
