= Tracianne Neilsen =

American physicist

Tracianne Beesley "Traci" Neilsen is an American physicist whose research concerns the use of machine learning in acoustics for source localization and source characterization, both in undersea applications and for aircraft. She is a professor at Brigham Young University (BYU) and associate chair of the BYU Department of Physics and Astronomy.

== Education and career ==
Neilsen was a physics major at BYU, graduating in 1992. She went to the University of Texas at Austin for graduate study in physics, and completed a Ph.D. there in 2000. Her dissertation, Normal Mode Extraction and Environmental Inversion from Underwater Acoustic Data, was supervised by Takeshi Udagawa and Evan K. Westwood.

She continued at the University of Texas at Austin for postdoctoral research from 2000 to 2003, and as a part-time research scientist from 2003 to 2007, while taking a part-time adjunct faculty position at BYU from 2004 to 2010. In 2010 she shifted to a regular-rank assistant professorship at BYU; she was promoted to associate professor in 2018 and full professor in 2024.

She has also served the Acoustical Society of America as chair of the Women in Acoustics Committee from 2018 to 2021 and as Chair of the Committee on Outreach and Education beginning in 2024.

== Recognition ==
Neilsen was elected as a Fellow of the Acoustical Society of America in 2022, "for applications of machine learning to inverse problems in ocean acoustics".
