= Meredith Belbin =

English researcher and management consultant (1926–2025)

Raymond Meredith Belbin
- Born: 4 June 1926; Sevenoaks, Kent, England
- Died: 6 March 2025 (aged 98)
- Education: Clare College, Cambridge
- Occupation: Management consultant
- Website: www.belbin.com

Raymond Meredith Belbin (4 June 1926 – 6 March 2025) was a British researcher and management consultant best known for his work on management teams. He was a visiting professor and Honorary Fellow of Henley Management College in Oxfordshire, England.

== Life and work ==
Belbin was born in Sevenoaks, Kent, England on 4 June 1926. At Clare College, Cambridge he started on a degree course in Classics but, after tiring of the subject, switched to a two-year course in Psychology, which he completed in half the time. In 1947, shortly after his marriage to Eunice, he embarked on a doctorate, centred on the Psychology of Ageing in Industry, also at Cambridge. At university he was a rowing partner with David Attenborough.

His first appointment after his doctorate was as a research fellow at Cranfield College (now Cranfield School of Management at Cranfield University). His early research focused mainly on older workers in industry. He returned to Cambridge and joined the Industrial Training Research Unit (ITRU) where his wife, Eunice Belbin OBE (née Fellows, 1915–2006), was director and he subsequently became chairman. Belbin combined this job with acting as OECD consultant running successful demonstration projects in Sweden, Austria, the United Kingdom and the United States.

It was while at ITRU, in the late 1960s, that Belbin was invited to carry out research at what was then called the Administrative Staff College at Henley-on-Thames. Belbin was interested not just in individual behaviour but also in group behaviour. However, he had no particular theories about teams and so recruited three other specialists to help him. These were mathematician and international chess master Bill Hartston, an anthropologist of the peoples of Kenya Jeanne Fisher, and occupational psychologist Roger Mottram. Over the next seven years they conducted three business games a year, with eight teams in each game. Across all of the many meetings they observed, categorised, and recorded all of the contributions of the team members. The research, which took nine years in total, formed the basis of his 1981 classic book, Management Teams: Why They Succeed or Fail. Belbin published a second book, Team Roles at Work, in 1993.

Owing to the successful application of his research in industry, by the late 1980s, Belbin was writing reports on recruitment and selection by hand. In 1987 Belbin, his wife Eunice, and their son Nigel, formed Belbin Associates, to offer Team Role advice globally via a software platform called Interplace. The company transitioned to Belbin Limited (an Employee Ownership Trust) in 2022.

Belbin lived at Barton, Cambridgeshire and was a keen gardener, opening his garden for many years for charity, as part of the National Garden Scheme. He married his second wife, Sheila, in 2008. He died, peacefully at home, on 6 March 2025, at the age of 98.

== Belbin's research ==
Belbin's 1981 book, Management Teams: Why They Succeed or Fail presented conclusions from his work studying how members of teams interacted during business games run at Henley Management College. Amongst his key findings was that the most successful teams were made up of a diverse mix of behaviours. He found that high-performing teams were able to represent each of the nine Belbin team role behaviours at the appropriate time, commensurate with the team's purpose and objectives. Each team member is likely to have strengths in two or three team roles, so that a team need not be as many as nine people, but perhaps should be at least three or four.

Whilst comparisons can be drawn between Belbin's behavioural team roles and personality types, Belbin defines a team role as one of nine clusters of behavioural attributes identified by his research at Henley as being effective in order to facilitate team progress. He claimed that the Belbin Team Inventory does not have psychometric properties. The Belbin Team Inventory is the only sanctioned method for deriving Belbin team roles.

=== Apollo Team Syndrome ===
Contrary to his initial predictions, Belbin discovered that teams made of high-intellect individuals often tended to fail. They were difficult to manage, prone to destructive debate and encountered significant difficulties with decision-making. The researchers called the phenomenon Apollo Team Syndrome after the first of these teams who, despite a promising membership with strong analytical skills and impressive academic credentials, foundered at every turn, resulting in poor team performance.

== Works ==
- Management Teams: Why They Succeed or Fail (3 ed.), Routledge, 2010, ISBN 978-0080-9635-94
- Team Roles at Work (3 ed.), Routledge, 2022, ISBN 978-1003-1631-52 with Victoria Brown

== See also ==
- Team effectiveness
- Team management
