= List of honorary degrees =

This list of honorary degrees lists all honorary degrees, including honorary doctorates.

== Honorary Bachelor's degrees ==
Name	Post-nominal	Reference
Bachelor of the University	B.Univ.	
Honorary Bachelor of Arts	Hon. B.A.	
Honorary Bachelor of Education	Hon. B.Ed.	
Honorary Bachelor of Science	Hon. B.S.	

== Honorary Master's degrees ==
Name	Post-nominal	Reference
Honorary Master of Arts	Hon. M.A.	
Honorary Master of Science	Hon. M.Sc.	
Master of the University	M.Univ.	

== Honorary doctorates ==
Name	Post-nominal	Reference
Doctor Honoris Causa	Dr.h.c.	
Doctor of the University	D.Univ.	
Honorary Doctor of Arts	Hon. D.A.	
Honorary Doctor of Arts and Humane Letters	Hon. D.A.H.	
Honorary Doctor of Business	Hon. D.B.	
Honorary Doctor of Dental Surgery	Hon. D.D.S.	
Honorary Doctor of Divinity	Hon. D.D.	
Honorary Doctor of Fine Arts	Hon. D.F.A.	
Honorary Doctor of Humane Letters	Hon. D.H.L.	
Honorary Doctor of Laws	Hon. LL.D.	
Honorary Doctor of Letters	Hon. Litt.D.	
Honorary Doctor of Liberal Arts	Hon. D.L.A.	
Honorary Doctor of Mathematics	Hon. D.Math.	
Honorary Doctor of Medicine	Hon. M.D.	
Honorary Doctor of Music	Hon. Mus.D.	
Honorary Doctor of Science	Hon. Sc.D.	
Honorary Doctor of Veterinary Medicine	Hon. D.Vet.Med.	
