= Burton Awards for Legal Achievement =

American legal award

Burton Awards
- Awarded for: Outstanding Accomplishments in Law
- Country: United States
- Presented by: Burton Foundation, held in association with the Library of Congress presented by lead sponsor Law360, and co-sponsored by the American Bar Association.
- First award: 1999-present
- Website: http://www.burtonawards.com/

The Burton Awards program is held in association with the Library of Congress, presented by lead sponsor Law360, and co-sponsored by the American Bar Association. The awards are generally selected by professors from Harvard Law School, Yale Law School, Stanford Law School, and Columbia Law School, among others.

== History ==
The Burton Awards were established in 1999 and funded by the Burton Foundation. Each year, a number of Legal Writing Award winners are chosen from partners at the largest law firms in the nation, as well as Law School Award winners. Other Burton Awards are presented annually which include the "Book of the Year Award," and "Outstanding Contributions to Legal Writing Education Award."

The award ceremonies are annually held at the Library of Congress in Washington D.C. Prominent officials who have been guest speakers at the event have included John G. Roberts, Jr., Chief Justice of the United States, Supreme Court Justice Stephen Breyer, Justice Antonin Scalia, Justice Ruth Bader Ginsburg, Justice Sonia Sotomayor and Justice John Paul Stevens (retired). In the past, other dignitaries have participated in the program including Tom Brokaw, Bob Schieffer, Tim Russert, Chris Matthews, George Will and master of ceremonies, Bill Press.

== Awards ==
- Distinguished Writing Awards - Category of Law Firms. Presented to the best law firm authors of articles dealing with legal issues published in the previous year.
- Distinguished Writing Awards - Category of Law Schools . Presented to the best law school authors of articles dealing with legal issues published in the previous year.
- Distinguished Public Service in the Military - Presented to the finest lawyers in the military.
- Outstanding Contributions to Legal Writing Education Award - Presented for outstanding contributions to the education of new lawyers in the field of legal analysis, research and writing, whether through teaching, program design, program support, innovative thinking or writing.
- The Legends in Law Awards - * Category of General Counsel. This selection is made on the following criteria: reputation in both the legal profession and as a proven authority in a specialized area of law; background and experience; complexity and scope of matters handled; global or national importance of issues confronted and proven and exemplary leadership in law.
- Technology Advancement in Law Award - Presented to a leader in technology, whose innovations profoundly benefit the practice of law.
- Law Firm Leadership Award - Presented to one of the finest professionals who have helped their firm to succeed in reputation and business, protected their firms against formidable obstacles, and who is highly ethical and universally respected.
- Book of the Year Award - Presented to the authors of the most outstanding book in the profession of law.
- The Outstanding Journalist in Law - Presented for a lifetime of achievement and accomplishment reporting on legal issues, cases or the profession.
- Artificial Intelligence in Law Award - Presented for innovative use of AI that advances the practice or understanding of law.
