= Soben Huon =

American beauty queen

Soben Huon Puckhaber
- Born: Soben Huon; Texas, U.S.
- Height: 5 ft 7 in (1.70 m)
- Beauty pageant titleholder
- Title: Miss Utah USA 2006
- Hair color: Black
- Eye color: Dark brown
- Major competition: Miss USA 2006

Soben Huon Puckhaber is an American beauty queen from Los Angeles, California, who has competed in the Miss USA pageant.

Huon won the Miss Utah USA 2006 title in late 2005 in her first attempt. She represented Utah in the Miss USA 2006 pageant broadcast live from Baltimore, Maryland, in April 2006. She was also the first woman of Asian descent to win the Miss Utah USA title. Huon is Cambodian American. The pageant was won by Tara Conner of Kentucky. Huon was one of twenty-six Miss USA Delegates who appeared on a Miss USA special of Deal or No Deal in April 2006, prior to the broadcast of the pageant.

A graduate of Brigham Young University, where she earned a B.A. in Political Science, Soben was a John B. Tsu Fellowship recipient of the International Leadership Foundation. While in Utah, she built lasting cultural connections through her participation as a State Titleholder with the Miss Universe Organization. Thereafter, she spent time in Berlin, Germany, working in a family office where she also studied to gain fluency in German.

Soben Huon is a Vice President at J.P. Morgan Securities, a wealth management division of J.P. Morgan. As a member of The Canell Group, she delivers financial planning and investment analysis to small business owners, retirees, corporate executives, athletes and entertainers.

Preceded by Marin Poole	Miss Utah USA; 2006	Succeeded by Heather Anderson
