= Rulon D. Pope =

American economist and anthropologist

Rulon Dean Pope (born c. 1949) is the Warren and Wilson Dusenberry Professor at Brigham Young University, specializing in agricultural economics, econometrics and microeconomic theory. He received his B.S. from Brigham Young University in 1971 and his Ph.D. in economics from Berkeley in 1976. He taught at the University of California, Davis (1976–79) and Texas A&M University (1979–82) prior to moving to BYU. Pope served as Chair of the BYU Economics department 1986-1992 and as Associate Dean of the College of Family, Home, and Social Science 2001–2006.

== Awards and honors ==
Pope became a fellow of the American Agricultural Economics Association in 1996.
