= Ronald G. Carter =

American writer

Ronald G. Carter (1932-2008) was the author of the nine volume historical fiction series Prelude to Glory about the American Revolution. Carter is also the author of several other books including Me and The Geezer, The Beecher Incident, The Youngest Drover, Death of a Stranger, The Trial of Mary Lou, The Royal Macabees, The Blackfoot Moonshine Rebellion of 1892, The Case of the Deadly Counterfeiters, The Case of the Golden Spike Kidnappers, The Clearwater Union War, and Unlikely Heroes.

Carter is a 1957 graduate of Brigham Young University and was a Latter-day Saint. He studied at the University of Utah and George Washington University towards his law degree which he received in 1962. He was research and writing director at the Los Angeles Superior Court system.

He is often credited under the name Ron Carter.

== Sources ==
- Amazon.com listing on Carter's books
- "LDS Readers Take Their Reading Serially", by Richard H. Cracroft in BYU Magazine Winter, 2003
- Michigan City Library listing of Authors and books
- Carter bio from Deseret Book
- Mormon Literature Database entry on Carter
- Historical Novel Society review of Our Sacred Honor
