= Noall Wootton =

American attorney (1940–2006)

Noall Thurber Wootton
- Born: September 8, 1940; American Fork, Utah, U.S.
- Died: April 27, 2006 (aged 65); Salt Lake City, Utah, U.S.
- Resting place: American Fork Cemetery; American Fork, Utah
- Education: Brigham Young University; University of Utah
- Occupation: Utah County District Attorney
- Known for: Prosecuted Gary Gilmore

Noall Thurber Wootton (September 8, 1940 – April 27, 2006) was an American attorney. He was the Utah County District Attorney in Utah, from 1974 to 1986. During his time in that role, he is most famous for being the lead prosecutor of Gary Gilmore, the first person to be executed after the 1976 reinstatement of the death penalty. Wootton earned his bachelor's degree from Brigham Young University in 1961 and a JD from the University of Utah in 1964. Noall Wootton died at the age of 65 on April 27, 2006 due to cancer.

== Portrayal ==
In 1980, Norman Mailer wrote The Executioner's Song about the events of the Gary Gilmore trial. Two years later, in 1982, a television adaption was made. In the film, Wootton was portrayed by Charles Cyphers.
