= John W. Limbong =

Indonesian educator and businessman (born 1957)

John Waller Limbong
- Born: 1944 (age 80–81)
- Education: B.S. M.Sc. (1982); PhD (1982)
- Alma mater: Brigham Young University; University of Utah
- Occupation: President of the University of International Golden Indonesia
- Spouse: Rosemia Simbolon

John Waller. Limbong (born 1944) in Boho North Sumatra is an Indonesian educator and businessman who is the founder and president of the University of International Golden Indonesia. He received a M.A and M.Sc in economics in 1982 from Brigham Young University (BYU) and subsequently earned a PhD from the University of Utah in 1982. Limbong says that while a student at BYU, one night he had a dream where Brigham Young visited him and asked him to establish a university in Limbong's native Jakarta, Indonesia. Limbong vacillated, as he worked for Bank Indonesia for a while, but he later quit that job to pursue this dream.
