= John R. Grout =

American educator (born 1959)

Dr. John R. Grout
- Born: 21 August 1959 (age 67)
- Education: Brigham Young University (B.S.); Pennsylvania State University (Ph.D.)
- Occupations: Professor and department head at Berry College
- Known for: Former dean of the Campbell School of Business; Chair of the Technology, Entrepreneurship, and Data Analytics Department; Developed Berry College’s Creative Technologies program and Berry’s makerspace, HackBerry Lab
- Spouse: Susan
- Children: 4

John R. Grout is an American educator who served as Dean of the Campbell School of Business at Berry College. He received a B.S. from Brigham Young University's Marriott School of Management in 1984, receiving the Operations/Systems Award for being the highest ranked graduating senior in his major. After working a few years for Signetics, Grout returned to school, earning a Ph.D. in management science from Pennsylvania State University in 1990. After graduation, Grout worked at Southern Methodist University from 1990 to 1997, subsequently accepting a position at Berry College.

Some of Grout's most notable research focuses on the Japanese term poka-yoke, or "mistake-proofing". In May 2004, Grout received the Shingo Prize for Manufacturing Excellence in Research in connection with research in this field. Grout and his wife, Susan, have four children.
