= Rita Wright (museum director) =

American museum director and curator

- Born: Rita Riddle
- Education: Brigham Young University, BA, MA; University of Utah, PhD
- Occupations: Museum Director, Art Historian, Curator
- Employer: Springville Museum of Art
- Spouse: Wes Wright
- Children: 5

Rita Wright is an American museum director and art historian. Since 2012, Wright has been the director of the Springville Museum of Art. Before joining the Springville Museum of Art she was Curator of Art and Artifacts at the Church History Museum in Salt Lake City, UT. She sits on the worldwide committee for art selection for the Church of Jesus Christ of Latter-day Saints (LDS Church).

== Early life and career ==
Wright completed bachelor's and master's degrees at Brigham Young University (BYU). She received a Doctor of Philosophy in European History from the University of Utah.

Wright and her husband operated an art and design business in California before moving to Utah to become an instructor at BYU. Wright led the academic department at the Brigham Young University Museum of Art (MOA) while also teaching at the university. She worked for eight years at the MOA, working on major exhibits of the works of Carl Bloch and James Tissot. "Artists through the ages have been able to express their testimony and beliefs through their work," explained Wright at the Bloch exhibit that hosted more than 250,000 visitors.

Wright was the Curator of Art and Artifacts at the Church History Museum until October 1, 2012. She also worked on the museum's exhibition team.

== Springville Museum of Art ==
Wright was named the new director of the Springville Museum of Art on August 16, 2012, replacing longtime director Vern Swanson. She curated a number of exhibitions including Sacred Spaces: Archetypes and Symbols in 2017 and Curiouser & Curiouser: The Artwork of James Christensen, Cassandra Barney, Emily McPhie & Family. Wright led the celebration of the 80th anniversary of the Springville Art Museum and the Spanish Colonial Revival style building. Wright has been called one of the "smartest critics we know" by the Dialogue: A Journal of Mormon Thought.

== Personal life ==
Wright is married to Wes Wright and has five children. In 2020, she discussed the art of dying and her own near death experience on the podcast In Retrospect.
