= Crucial Conversations: Tools for Talking When Stakes Are High =

2002 book by Kerry Patterson, Joseph Grenny, Ron McMillan, and Al Switzler

- First edition
- Author: Kerry Patterson; Joseph Grenny; Ron McMillan; Al Switzler
- Language: English
- Genre: Nonfiction
- Publisher: McGraw-Hill
- Publication date: 2002
- Publication place: United States
- Media type: Hardback & paperback
- Pages: 288 pp. (hardback edition)
- ISBN: 0071771328 (hardback)

Crucial Conversations: Tools for Talking When Stakes Are High is a business self-help book written by the four co-founders of VitalSmarts—Kerry Patterson, Joseph Grenny, Ron McMillan, and Al Switzler. It was first published in 2002 by McGraw-Hill, with a second edition coming out in 2012 and a third in 2022. The book has sold more than two million copies and has been translated into 28 languages.

Crucial Conversations was ranked by Business Insider as one of the most popular business books of 2013.

In conjunction with the book, the authors offer training on how to hold more effective conversations.

Crucial Conversations is part of the Crucial Learning series, which also includes such titles as Crucial Confrontations, Crucial Accountability, and Crucial Influence.
