= Randy L. Bott =

American academic

Randy Bott
- Born: 1945 (age 79–80); Utah, United States
- Education: B.S. Psychology; M.S. Education; Ed.D. Educational leadership
- Alma mater: Utah State University; Brigham Young University
- Occupation: Religion professor at BYU
- Known for: RateMyProfessors.com #1 National Professor (2008)
- Spouse: Vickie Pehrson (m. 1969; died 2023)
- Children: 6

Randy LaMar Bott (born 1945) is a former American professor of religion at Brigham Young University (BYU) in Provo, Utah, United States. He taught classes on missionary preparation and the Doctrine and Covenants, and wrote doctrinal and motivational literature about the Church of Jesus Christ of Latter-day Saints (LDS Church).

== Biography ==
=== Education and personal life ===
After earning a B.S. in psychology from Utah State University, Bott earned his M.S. degree in education from the same university and an Ed.D. from BYU in 1988. Bott also speaks Samoan.

Bott has served in various capacities of the LDS Church, including bishop, high councilor, stake presidency counselor, and as a mission president in Fresno, California. Bott married Vickie Pehrson in September 1969. They had three boys and three girls, and became the grandparents of 14 children.

=== Professional life ===
Bott said in 2008 that he spent four to six hours every day answering phone calls and e-mails from his students, which "enables him to have a more personal touch with the students he teaches". At the beginning of his classes, he invites students to ask questions about missionary life, LDS Church doctrine, and personal comportment. Bott's tests, which he calls "celebrations", are open-note, open-book. In 2008, Bott taught 3,149 students at BYU, or over 10 percent of the university's student body. In 2008 Bott was the highest-rated professor in the United States on the website Ratemyprofessors.com.

In February 2012, Bott drew criticism for a quote in a Washington Post article about the LDS Church's stand on race. The LDS Church consequently issued a press release in response to the article later the same month and also posted a page titled "Race and the Priesthood" on its official website the following year.

It was announced in March 2012 that Bott would be leaving his teaching post at BYU to serve as a senior missionary with his wife, and he retired from BYU in June 2012.

== Works ==
Bott has authored and co-authored books on missionary preparation, LDS Church doctrine, application of doctrine to life, and the writings of Joseph Smith.

Non-fiction – religious and general interest

- Bott, Randy L. (1995). Prepare with Honor. Salt Lake City, Utah: Deseret Book. ISBN 978-0-87579-954-4. OCLC 32921793.
- Bott, Randy L. (1995). Serve with Honor. Salt Lake City, Utah: Deseret Book. ISBN 978-0-87579-955-1. OCLC 32894312.
- Bott, Randy L. (1995). Home with Honor. Salt Lake City, Utah: Deseret Book. ISBN 978-0-87579-956-8. OCLC 32925501.
- Bott, Randy L. (1997). Send forth with Honor. Orem, Utah: Millennial Press. ISBN 978-0-9660231-1-4. OCLC 39207000.
- Bott, Randy L. (1997). Divorceless Marriage. Orem, Utah: Millennial Press. ISBN 978-0-9660231-0-7. OCLC 41553104.
- Bott, Randy L. (2003). Preparation Precedes Power. Orem, Utah: Millennial Press. ISBN 978-1-932597-06-6. OCLC 54996984.
- Bott, Randy L. (2003). Parenting with Eternal Perspective. Orem, Utah: Millennial Press. ISBN 978-1-932597-01-1. OCLC 60354112.
- Bott, Randy L. (2003). Eternal Marriage. Orem, Utah: Millennial Press. ISBN 978-1-932597-03-5. OCLC 60354110.
- Bott, Randy L. (2003). Death: Finding Hope Beyond the Sorrow. Orem, Utah: Millennial Press. ISBN 978-1-932597-04-2. OCLC 60354111.
- Bott, Randy L. (2003). Depression: Finding His Light amid the Storm. Orem, Utah: Millennial Press. ISBN 978-1-932597-02-8. OCLC 60354109.
- Bott, Randy L. (2005). Overcoming Addictive Behavior. Orem, Utah: Millennial Press. ISBN 978-1-932597-28-8. OCLC 62099022.
- Bott, Randy L. (2007). Abuse: Breaking the Cycle. Orem, Utah: Millennial Press. ISBN 978-1-932597-48-6. OCLC 173182318.
- Bott, Randy L. (2007). Broken Covenants. Orem, Utah: Millennial Press. ISBN 978-1-932597-47-9. OCLC 173182629.

Collaborations/inclusions

- Shute, R. Wayne; Nyman, Monte S.; Bott, Randy L. (1999). Ephraim, Chosen of the Lord: what it means to be of the tribe of Ephraim. Salt Lake City, Utah: Millennial Press. ISBN 978-0-9660231-3-8. OCLC 42018902.
- Bott, Randy L. (2005). "The Vision: Doctrine and Covenants 76". In Black, Susan Easton; Skinner, Andrew C. (eds.). Joseph: exploring the life and ministry of the prophet. Salt Lake City, Utah: Deseret Book. ISBN 978-1-59038-471-8. OCLC 59817848.
- Bott, Randy L. (2006). "Understanding mortal trials: enlightenment from the Doctrine and Covenants". In Shute, R. Wayne; Krogh, John E. (eds.). Clay in the master's hands: understanding trials, tragedy and tribulation. Orem, Utah: Millennial Press. ISBN 978-1-932597-33-2. OCLC 159966337.

Academic

- Bott, Randy L. (1988). A comparison of gain scores and retention rates of four selected learning strategies (Ed. D.). Dept. of Educational Leadership, Brigham Young University. OCLC 22015388.
- Marett, Kevin M; Gibbons, W Eugene; Memmott, Rae Jeanne; Bott, Randy L.; Duke, Lee (1998). "The Organizational Role of Clinical Practice Models in Interdisciplinary Collaborative Practice". Clinical Social Work Journal. 26 (2). Springer: 217–225. doi:10.1023/A:1022875119429. OCLC 360558760. S2CID 140353531.

Fiction

- Bott, Randy L.; Bott, Vickie (2006). Tidings of comfort and joy. Orem, Utah: Millennial Press. ISBN 978-1-932597-35-6. OCLC 71747010.
