= Team Role Inventories =

Test to measure preference for nine Team Roles

The Belbin Team Inventory, also called Belbin Self-Perception Inventory (BSPI) or Belbin Team Role Inventory (BTRI), is a behavioural test. It was devised by Raymond Meredith Belbin to measure preference for nine Team Roles; he had identified eight of these whilst studying numerous teams at Henley Management College.

The Inventory assesses how an individual behaves in a team environment. The assessment includes 360-degree feedback from observers as well as the individual's own evaluation of their behaviour, and contrasts how they see their behaviour with how their colleagues do.

Belbin himself asserts that the Team Roles are not equivalent to personality types, and that unlike the Myers-Briggs Type Indicator, which is a psychometric instrument used to sort people into one of 16 personality types, the Belbin Inventory scores people on how strongly they express behavioural traits from nine different Team Roles. A person may and often does exhibit strong tendencies towards multiple roles.

== History ==
Belbin first began studying teams at Henley Management College in the 1960s. Over a period of ten years, he carried out extended observational research to determine which factors influenced team failure or success. A management game was designed to reproduce work life. It contained all the principal variables that typify the problems of decision-making in a business environment. The experiment was designed along scientific lines with careful measurement at each stage.

Those participating were invited to take a battery of psychometric tests and teams were assembled on the basis of test scores. At first, Belbin hypothesised that high-intellect teams would succeed where lower-intellect teams would not. However, the outcome of this research was that certain teams, predicted to be excellent based on intellect, failed to fulfil their potential. In fact, it became apparent by looking at the various combinations that it was not intellect, but balance, which enabled a team to succeed. The most successful companies tended to be those with a mix of different people, i.e. those with a range of different behaviours. In fact, nine separate clusters of behaviour turned out to be distinctive and useful, with the balance required dependent on the purpose and objectives of the team.

== Application and use ==
The Belbin Team Inventory first appeared in Belbin's book Management Teams: Why They Succeed or Fail (1981). The inventory is protected by Belbin's copyright and cannot be reproduced in any form. Additionally, it is not normed, lacks the Specialist role and the benefit of feedback from colleagues, and does not offer Team Role feedback. Much early research is based upon this now obsolete version of the inventory.

In the initial research, eight team-role behavioural styles were identified -- Chairman, Shaper, Plant, Monitor-Evaluator, Company Worker, Resource Investigator, Team Worker, and Completer-Finisher. The current schema has been refined to include a ninth style -- Specialist—and in addition has renamed the Chairman behavioural style Co-ordinator and the Company Worker style Implementer.

Belbin now administers the refined Belbin Team Inventory via e-interplace, a computerised system which scores and norms the data to produce feedback reports for individuals, teams, groups and jobs. Meredith Belbin argues that the optimum size for a team is 4 people. Beyond this number, individuals do not work closely enough together to constitute a team and are defined as a group.

Data from the Belbin Team Inventory can also be amalgamated and interpreted to assess how effectively a team is likely to work together, including selecting the best candidate to fulfil each role, and identifying gaps and overlaps in the Team Role distribution which might affect a team's success. The Belbin Team Inventory can also be used in conjunction with the Belbin Job Requirements Inventory to assess a candidate's behavioural performance in a particular job.

== Belbin Team Roles ==
=== Plant ===
Plants are creative, unorthodox and generators of ideas. If an innovative solution to a problem is needed, a Plant is a good person to ask. A good Plant will be bright and free-thinking. Plants can tend to ignore incidentals. The Plant might be caricatured as the absent-minded professor/inventor, and often has a hard time communicating ideas to others. Multiple Plants in a team can lead to misunderstandings, as many ideas are generated without sufficient discernment or the impetus to follow the ideas through to action. Plants can also create problems with the timing of their ideas. The fact that the team has decided on a valid way forward and is now in the implementation stage will not stop the Plant from coming up with new solutions and disrupting the implementation process.

Belbin observed, "We called these clever people plants, because the chaps at Henley insisted we plant one in each group".

=== Resource Investigator ===
The Resource Investigator gives a team a rush of enthusiasm at the start of the project by vigorously pursuing contacts and opportunities. He or she is focused outside the team, and has a finger firmly on the pulse of the outside world. Whereas a Plant creates new ideas, a Resource Investigator will quite happily appropriate them from other companies or people. A good Resource Investigator is a maker of possibilities and an excellent networker, but has a tendency to lose momentum towards the end of a project and to forget to follow things up.

=== Co-ordinator ===
A Co-ordinator is a likely candidate for the chairperson of a team, since they have a talent for stepping back to see the big picture. Co-ordinators are confident, stable and mature and because they recognise abilities in others, they are very good at delegating tasks to the right person for the job. The Co-ordinator clarifies decisions, helping everyone else focus on their tasks. Co-ordinators are sometimes perceived to be manipulative and will tend to delegate all work, leaving nothing but the delegating for them to do.

=== Shaper ===
The Shaper is a task-focused individual who pursues objectives with vigour and who is driven by tremendous energy and the need to achieve. For the Shaper, winning is the name of the game. The Shaper provides the necessary drive to ensure that the team is kept moving and does not lose focus or momentum. Shapers are people who challenge the team to improve. They are dynamic and usually extraverted people who enjoy stimulating others, questioning norms, and finding the best approaches for solving problems. The Shaper is the one who shakes things up to make sure that all possibilities are considered and that the team does not become complacent. Shapers could risk becoming aggressive and bad-humoured in their attempts to get things done. Shapers often see obstacles as exciting challenges and they tend to have the courage to push on when others feel like quitting.

=== Monitor Evaluator ===
Monitor Evaluators are fair and logical observers and judges of what is going on in the team. Since they are good at detaching themselves from bias, they are often the ones to see all available options with the greatest clarity and impartiality. They take a broad view when problem-solving, and by moving slowly and analytically, will almost always come to the right decision. However, they can become very critical, damping enthusiasm for anything without logical grounds, and they have a hard time inspiring themselves or others to be passionate about their work.

=== Teamworker ===
A Teamworker acts as the "oil" between the cogs that keep the machine that is the team running smoothly. They are good listeners and diplomats, talented at smoothing over conflicts and helping parties understand one another without becoming confrontational. Since the role can be a low-profile one, the beneficial effect of a Teamworker can go unnoticed and unappreciated until they are absent, when the team begins to argue, and small but important things cease to happen. Because of an unwillingness to take sides, a Teamworker may not be able to take decisive action when needed.

=== Implementer ===
The Implementer takes their colleagues' suggestions and ideas and turns them into positive action. They are efficient and self-disciplined, and can always be relied on to deliver on time. They are motivated by their loyalty to the team or company, which means that they will often take on jobs everyone else avoids or dislikes. However, they may be seen as closed-minded and inflexible since they will often have difficulty deviating from their own well-thought-out plans, especially if such a deviation compromises efficiency or threatens well-established practices.

=== Completer Finisher ===
The Completer Finisher is a perfectionist and will often go the extra mile to make sure everything is "just right," and the things he or she delivers can be trusted to have been double-checked and then checked again. The Completer Finisher has a strong inward sense of the need for accuracy, and sets his or her own high standards rather than working on the encouragement of others. They may frustrate their teammates by worrying excessively about minor details and by refusing to delegate tasks that they do not trust anyone else to perform.

=== Specialist ===
Specialists are passionate about learning in their own particular field. As a result, they are likely to be a fountain of knowledge and will enjoy imparting this knowledge to others. They also strive to improve and build upon their expertise. If there is anything they do not know the answer to, they will happily go and find out. Specialists bring a high level of concentration, ability, and skill in their discipline to the team, but can only contribute on that specialism and will tend to be uninterested in anything which lies outside its narrow confines.

The Belbin Team Inventory was revised to include the Specialist role, since the role was not revealed in the original research because no specialized knowledge was required for the simulation exercise.

== Validity and reliability ==
Following the introduction of Belbin's approach to Team Role analysis in 1981, an independent study of the psychometric properties of the instruments was published in 1993 in the Journal of Occupational and Organizational Psychology. Belbin took to task the authors, Furnham, Steele and Pendleton and the Journal provided Furnham space to reply. Belbin argued that the instruments were not intended for scholarly inquiry, but to inform management consulting practices. Additionally, Belbin maintains that the Belbin Team Inventory is not a psychometric instrument and hence applying tests for psychometric properties are irrelevant.

There have been several other scholarly studies of the validity and reliability of Belbin's approach over the nearly 26 years since the Furnham-Belbin exchange, most of which have used the inventory in its original form. Fisher, Hunter & MacRosson (2001, June) argue that Furnham's approach (also discussed in Fisher, Macrosson & Sharp (1996)) has fundamental problems in the definitions of several of the eight roles (see also Broucek & Randall (1996) for a more detailed treatment of this problem). Both the Fisher, et al. (2001) and the earlier Broucek & Randall (1996) find that observational and factor analytical approaches yield five rather than eight role constructs. Fisher, et al. go on to argue that this coherence of the five traits of teams is backed up by earlier research by Barrick & Mount (1991).

The original research into the Belbin Team Roles was conducted with the old, copyrighted, eight-role version that was intended for an individual's own interest rather than for use as a tool. More recent studies using normed data from Belbin's e-interplace system, such as that by Aritzeta, Swailes and Senior (2004) have found higher correlations and reliability, as well as distinct analytical constructs using the online, normed, nine-role tool with observers added to give 360-degree feedback (enhancing construct validity by providing "real-world" data). Swailes and McIntyre-Bhatty also argued (2001 & 2002) that traditional attempts to measure reliability have been misapplied when it comes to the Belbin Team Role Inventory because it is neither ipsative nor non-ipsative, and an equation that took this anomaly into account gave higher estimates of reliability and validity.

== Educational applications ==
The Belbin Team Inventory is used in educational settings, including higher education. Smith, Polglase & Parry (2012) applied the Belbin team role self and observer perceptions to a large cohort (145) of undergraduate students in a module assessed through two separate group projects. Students self-selected groups for the first project; for the second, groups were more 'balanced'. Results showed a slight improvement in group performance compared with that of previous cohorts, with a significant increase in first-class grades. No evidence was found linking group balance to performance; however, students recognized the value of their Belbin report when entering the job market.

== Other team role inventories ==
=== Team Management Profile (TMP) ===
A competitor to the Belbin system, developed independently in Australia by Dr Charles Margerison and Dr Dick McCann, is the Margerison–McCann Team Management Profile, published by Team Management Systems (TMS Global). Visually this appears to be a similar wheel with rather similar roles, whose titles are different. However, where Belbin focuses on role-based behaviour, the Team Management Profile is a psychometric which measures work preferences. In general, most Belbin roles tend to gravitate towards the relevant quadrant of the Team Management Wheel with the exception of the ‘creative’ and the ‘leadership’ roles which fail to transfer or correspond in any simple or direct way. Team Management Systems (TMS Global) states: "Independent British Psychological Society reviews (1995, 2000 and 2003) on the Team Management Profile are available"

=== Star Roles Model ===
The Star Roles Model is used by organisations to describe the positions managers and mentors adopt when guiding direct-reports and mentees. The concept builds on the Group Roles model developed by Benne & Sheats in 1948, taking a short-cut route to describing preferences when guiding others. Similarly, the Roles Model follows the Mintzberg 10 management positions – drawing in the most relevant elements when considering the mentoring relationship in detail.

== See also ==
- Collaboration
- Group behavior
- Organization Science
- Six Thinking Hats
- Theory of multiple intelligences
- Phrenology
