= List of films of the Church of Jesus Christ of Latter-day Saints =

The Church of Jesus Christ of Latter-day Saints (LDS Church) has commissioned or officially produced several non-commercial motion pictures. Such films were originally used in the homes or worship services of church members, or in visitors' centers on Temple Square or near one of the church's temples. Most church films were produced by LDS Motion Picture Studios. Since the opening of the Joseph Smith Memorial Building in downtown Salt Lake City, Utah in 1993, some feature-length films were premiered and exclusively shown in its Legacy Theatre, prior to release for broader use. In the 1970s, the church also commissioned Brigham Young University (BYU) to produce short films for use in the Church Educational System. These films, shown mostly in the seminaries and institutes of religion, teach religious principles, church history, and general kindness. Released on VHS (and increasingly on DVD), they became popular home entertainment. A wide variety of these films are now available through BYU's Creative Works Office.

These films differ from those of Mormon cinema, which are produced without official church involvement.

== Feature films ==
Title	Year of release	Duration	Plot / notability	Reference
Church Welfare in Action	1948	31 min.	This is a documentary on what LDS Church welfare is and how it functions.	
A Teacher is Born	1955		Produced for the Sunday School board of the Church of Jesus Christ of Latter-day Saints. It was designed as a training video for Sunday School teachers by showing the training needed to teach well.The collection has one copy on a film reel.	
How Near to the Angels	1956	42 min.	Dramatizes the problems faced by a young Mormon woman in choosing a husband, with emphasis on temple marriage. Depicts problem of peer pressure and the positive influence of a caring adviser.	
Decision	1957	15 min.	The true story of the decision faced by a young LDS serviceman forced to choose between social acceptance and obedience to the Word of Wisdom.	
Feed My Sheep	1957	30 min.	A Sunday School seeks ways to better influence her students. Her vital interest in the everyday lives of her students brings her good results and great satisfaction.	
As the Twig is Bent	1958	26 min.	A father's use of tobacco contributes to his inactivity in the Church and has an adverse effect on his two young boys. Emphasizes the importance of temple marriage and of a good example. An anti-smoking video about a father trying to quit smoking.	
Hearts of the Children	1959	27 min.	Features President Joseph Fielding Smith and his emphasis on the importance of genealogy and temple work. Historical vignettes dramatize events from the lives of the Prophet Joseph Smith's ancestors in order to create interest in our own ancestors.	
Unto the least of These	1959	32 min.	Belle Spafford, who was general Relief Society president at the time the film was produced, introduces the story of a visiting teacher who is not convinced of the worth of the visiting teaching program. Through subsequent experiences, the visiting teacher learns how her labors can bring joy to herself and to others. Starring Lethe Tatge.	
How Near To The Angels	1959	43 min.	Depicts the positive influence an adviser can have when a young LDS woman must make some difficult decisions about whom she will marry. Places emphasis on temple marriage. Starring Lethe Tatge.	
Til Death Do Us Part	1960	21 min.	A young LDS woman is torn between her desire to marry a nonmember and her loyalty to her parents and to the Church.	
Up In Smoke	1960	22 min.	This facetious look at a tobacco company's attempts to make cigarette smoking enticing both entertains and makes its point. An anti-smoking video about the dangers of cigarette smoking.	
A Time For Sowing	1960	22 min.	The Gray family are Church members with human weaknesses and strengths. The effects of parental behavior and example on the children are clearly dramatized.	
Shannon	1961	33 min.	Depicts the persistent and loving efforts of a Young Women leader to bring a teenage girl back into church activity.	
My Brother's Keeper	1961	33 min.	An ineffective Sunday School teacher causes a young boy to become negative toward the Church. The patient efforts of a bishop eventually bring him back.	
A Chosen People	1961	25 min.	Based on a true story of an Indian chief's dream wherein he was told to search for a people who possessed a book containing a history of his ancestors. Recaps the coming forth of the Book of Mormon and emphasizes the ties between the American Indians and the Book of Mormon.	
The Worth Of Souls	1961	27 min.	Sunday golf seems to lose its importance as Joe hears his young son tearfully express a desire for his parents to be sealed in the temple. Joe's revived interest in his family and in genealogy helps him to become active in the Church.	
The Search for Truth	1962	41 min.	Documentary about the harmony of science and religion, featuring interviews with Wernher von Braun, Harvey Fletcher, and Henry Eyring.	
Summer of Decision	1962	27 min.	A sheltered young LDS man goes away to college and runs into opposition to his faith and beliefs. As he struggles, counsel from an Institute teacher and a nightmare dream about a car crash with his girlfriend, reaffirm his faith and his testimony.	
Follow Me	1962	25 min.	Shows how principles Christ exemplified and taught can help resolve interpersonal feuding problems among adults and children.	
They Came Singing	1962	25 min.	Produced for Church Information Services and narrated by Richard L. Evans. Scenes from the Mormon Tabernacle Choir's 1955 European tour highlight this presentation, which traces the musical heritage of the Church and emphasizes the importance of music in the Church.	
Measure Of A Man	1962	23 min.	A young man must decide whether to follow the crowd and drink beer or to do what he knows is right. Dramatizes problems youth may confront in dealing with peer pressure.	
Worth Waiting For	1962	27 min.	Julie and Joe are determined to marry, in spite of counsel from friends and parents. It is not until Julie sees the unhappy circumstances of a married friend that she and Joe decide that a happy marriage is worth waiting for.	
The Windows of Heaven	1963	50 min.	The story of Lorenzo Snow's revelation on tithing, while the church faces debt and drought.	
A Family's Concern	1963	29 min.	A rancher's search for lost sheep and later for a lost boy is likened to the effort sometimes needed to locate lost genealogical information about ancestors. President David O. Mckay concludes the film by encouraging members in their genealogical responsibilities.	
Of Heaven and Home	1963	31 min.	Film about the importance of Home Teaching in the LDS church and how they help out families.	
Bitter Wind	1963	30 min.	This story of an American Indian boy whose family is destroyed by alcoholism presents a powerful message for all ages and races.	
By Their Fruits	1963	26 min.	Sponsored by the Sunday School. This modern parable depicts three Sunday School teachers of varying degrees of effectiveness and how the diligence or slothfulness of each is reflected in the lives of their students.	
The Morning Breaks	1964	17 min.	A brief introduction to the history of the Church up to the production date of the film. Lowell Thomas narrates the prologue, and Richard L. Evans tells the story of the Church. Music by the Mormon Tabernacle Choir.	
No More a Stranger	1964		The story focuses on the reception of a new family into a ward.	
Man's Search for Happiness	1964	13 min.	Brief overview of the plan of salvation; produced for the 1964 New York World's Fair	
The Long Road Back	1965	25 min.	This dramatization depicts the long and difficult road a young man faces in repenting of unchastity and immoral behavior with his girlfriend.	
How Do I Love Thee?	1965	30 min.	Two young women who are roommates have differing philosophies. One disregards morals in an effort to win the affections of a boyfriend. The other fights to maintain standards. A different situation comes from each decision.	
Love Is For The Byrds	1965	26 min.	Dramatizes how important effective communications in marriage can be and how difficulties may result when both partners cannot agree on their roles in marriage.	
Losers Weepers	1965		The film argues the importance for youth to finish high school.	
And Should We Die	1966	53 min.	The film depicts the persecution of Latter-day Saints in Mexico during the Mexican Revolution and the death of two Church members for not denying their faith.	
Last Day At Carthage	1967	6 min.	Depicts the martyrdom of Joseph and Hyrum Smith at Carthage Jail; a narration with photography of the jail and the surrounding landscape in black and white.	
When Thou Art Converted	1968	29 min.	A hardworking elders quorum president finds that loving all the members of his quorum is not easy when one of those members is a strong business competitor. Emphasizes the importance of finding answers to life's problems in the scriptures. Starring Gordon Jump.	
Worthy To Stand	1968	29 min.	A young lawyer devotes little time to his home teaching and finds his efforts of little value to his families. Discouraged, he asks for a release, because he considers his time to be precious. A letter from a missionary whose parents are separating helps him to see how he has failed. The missionary's prayer for his parents is answered as the home teacher helps them toward reconciliation. Starring Mike Farrell.	
Walk In Their Shoes	1968	24 min.	Stan and his younger sister, Cheryl, resent their parents' interference in what they consider to be their own affairs. When the parents must leave town for a short time to be with grandma in the hospital, Stan is placed in charge. When conflicts arise, Stan acts like a parent, a role he has never before tried to understand.	
The Three Witnesses	1968	30 min.	Film presents the story of story of Oliver Cowdery, Martin Harris and David Whitmer as witnesses of the Book of Mormon, and was released in 1968.	
Marriage- What Kind For You?	1968	25 min.	An engaged couple view four other couples at a New Year's office party. They are able to see different kinds of marriage relationships. Useful for both married and unmarried couples as a basis for discussion on building positive marital relationships. Starring Gordon Jump.	
Tom Trails	1968	3 hours 34 min.	A photographed TV series about Tom Trails and the trials he goes through in High School including speaking in front of class, repenting of his sin with a woman, being falsely accused of attempted murder.	
Are You The One?	1968	24 min.	Although Doug and Marilyn have strong feelings for each other, they discover major differences in attitude that warn them of major conflicts should they decide to marry.	
Never A Bride	1969	22 min.	A self-seeking girl thinks she has found the right man while on vacation at the horse ranch, but she is disappointed to discover that she really has little to offer when he becomes engaged to a more mature girl. She learns that it is more important to be the right person than to find the right person.	
Mirror, Mirror:You and Your Self Image	1969	24 min.	An insecure teenager redirects his life to concentrate on those things he can do well, rather than on those things he cannot do. This presentation is good for bolstering self-image. Filmed at Lagoon theme park and at Provo High School in Provo, Utah.	
Johnny Lingo	1969	24 min.	In Polynesia, Johnny has come to the island to bargain eight cows for Mahana to be his wife. Filmed at Laie, O'ahu, Hawaii.	
For Time Or Eternity?	1969	28 min.	Dramatizes the conflict a young LDS woman faces in trying to decide if she will marry in the temple or outside of the temple. Filmed in California and Las Vegas, Nevada.	
Pioneers in Petticoats	1969	44 min.	Young women form the Young Women's Retrenchment Society as resistance against worldly trends. Starring Gordon Jump.	
That Which Was Lost	1969	29 min.	As Rick becomes associated with wayward hippie friends who smoke and take drugs, the concern of an adviser and an unpleasant experience help him to realize the importance of some of the things he thought he could give up. Shows how love and persistence can bring back the "lost sheep."	
A Day For Justin	1970	28 min.	The story of a boy who discovers for himself that self-sacrifice in the service of others brings blessings. Starring Johnny Whittaker.	
What About Thad?	1970	20 min.	The story of a shy eight-year-old boy growing up without much love or acceptance from his family, teachers, or friends. One day Thad gets bullied by his peers at church, and he throws a rock at the church window breaking it. His two primary teachers try to figure out what went wrong with Thad. Illustrates some of the problems in making the Church program work on his behalf. Featuring Gordon Jump.	
Ice Cream and Elevators	1971	27 min.	A BYU documentary on the lives of students living in the BYU apartment and going to school at BYU in the 1970s.	
Run Dick, Run Jane	1971	24 min.	A BYU documentary about running and exercise. Features George Romney.	
Cipher in the Snow	1973	24 min.	The true story of a boy no one thinks is important. After his sudden death one winter morning, acquaintances begin to reflect on the needs of every individual child.	
The Lost Manuscript	1974	45 min.	The film depicts the translation of the Book of Mormon by Joseph Smith and the loss of the first 116 pages by Martin Harris.	
Elaine Dart, Not Like Other People	1975	14 min.	This documentary shows Elaine Dart's success in dealing with cerebral palsy. Through perseverance and patience, she has learned to coordinate her feet to accomplish even such intricate tasks as threading a needle, stringing beads, and knitting.	
The First Vision	1976	15 min.	A dramatization of Joseph Smith's First Vision as described in Joseph Smith–History and based on Smith's 1838 account of the experience.	
John Baker's Last Race	1976	35 min.	The true story of a champion athlete who is given only six months to live. His last race, with time itself, becomes his greatest as he dedicates his life to the children he teaches, making every child feel important.	
The Phone Call	1977	24 min.	Scott is trying earn enough money for karate gear by working first as a paperboy, then at a Drive-in-Burger called Ripples; he is also trying to gain confidence to call Pam on a date. Starring Marc McClure. Filmed at Ripples in Provo, Utah.	
The Mailbox	1977	24 min.	An elderly widow anxiously awaits mail from her family, but letters do not come. The neighbors make life bearable, but they cannot replace her family. Helps to motivate children and adults alike to maintain communication with their elderly parents and grandparents. Starring Lethe Tatge.	
Making A Better World	1978	28 min.	A young man begins to stray from church activity. His bishop involves him in the bishop's youth committee, where he finds fulfillment in service activities.	
Uncle Ben	1978	27 min.	The true story of an alcoholic who seeks custody of nephews and a niece orphaned by an accident. As he faces the challenge to overcome his alcohol problem and be a good father, he realizes a greater reward than he had imagined.	
Dream Big	1978	10 min.	Documents a true story about Glen Cunningham, who after a serious accident in his youth was told he would never walk again. Through determination and courage, Glen became a famous, record-breaking runner. Emphasizes how important it is to set goals high and work toward them.	
The Guilty	1978	21 min.	This dramatization, produced for LDS audiences, is based on a story (by Elder Marion D. Hanks) that teaches love and concern for others. This takes place inside an LDS chapel during sacrament testimony meeting. Starring Gordon Jump.	
The Trophy Case	1979	26 min.	Randy, a teenager, tries to gain his father's approval by excelling in sports. Randy wants more independence, but his father feels the need to be firm in his guidance as long as he is providing for his son. The ending song, "If I Could Dream," was written and performed by Merrill Jenson.	
The Emmett Smith Story	1979	23 min.	Emmett Smith is a runner and coach at Cortez High School in Phoenix Arizona. When he develops a brain tumor, he gets surgery and is told he may never run again. After that he is determined to regain his balance and focus as he's struggling to run with the students. Meanwhile, another student, Cindy Duncan, is disabled and uses a wheelchair, but is determined to be able to walk on crutches and then walk without them.	
Blind Love	1979	25 min.	A blind man is going to have eye surgery but his wife is worried, thinking she'll look ugly to him. Takes place in the 1940s era. Music is composed by Merrill Jenson.	
Lilies Grow Wild	1979	15 min.	A timeless feature set in the 1950s. Depicts the unusual way in which a rural school teacher's class learns about self-esteem and the importance of every person including a troubled boy named Jeddy.	
Begin with the End in Mind	1979	29 min.	As a result of an argument between a father and his son, the father is motivated to increase his effectiveness as a teacher in the Church. By getting help and by using meetinghouse library materials, he improves both his teaching and his communication with his son.	
Christmas Snows, Christmas Winds	1979	28 min.	One man reminisces of warm Christmas memories from his childhood. But he cannot forget one Christmas experience that still brings him regret as he remembers his unkindness to a German girl at the Christmas concert.	
The Drop Card	1980	15 min.	The story of a first-year college student who needs help and of a teacher who takes time to be her friend. Points out that feelings of inadequacy are extremely common in human experience, and can be overcome.	
In One Blinding Moment	1980	16 min.	Depicts a father's struggle with bitterness toward the teenage driver of a car that killed his young son. One day the father sees a sign made by his son that says "Love One Another." His whole attitude changes, and he seeks to help the boy who killed his son. Music is composed by Merrill Jenson.	
Greater Love	1980	14 min.	A young boy needs a blood transfusion to survive after a car accident. Because he has a rare blood type, only his sister can give the blood immediately. When the boy is out of danger after the transfusion, his sister reveals the depth of her love for him.	
Joseph Smith: The Man	1980	9 min.	The years between our day and the time of the Prophet Joseph Smith are effectively spanned as Lethe Tatge recounts to a group of children what her great-grandfather told her of his first hand experiences with the prophet.	
Mr. Krueger's Christmas	1980	26 min.	A widowed janitor (played by James Stewart) yearns for company on Christmas and daydreams about the spirit of the holiday.	
A Marvelous Work Begins	1982	17 min.	Some of the major events in the coming forth of the Book of Mormon are dramatized, including the loss of the 116 pages of original manuscript.	
Follow Me	1983	25 min.	It depicts a Christian family who learns to love others.	
The Last Leaf	1984	24 min.	O. Henry's story about a dying young girl, and her artist neighbor (played by Art Carney) who yearns to paint his masterpiece.	
The Award	1984	45 min.	Some high school football players plan on giving an award to the ugliest girl in school. But one teenage boy learns about her beauty inside and how she helps kids with disabilities; he later decides to give the best award for making a difference to the kids in need.	
Church In Action 1981-85	1985	40 min.	Documents highlights of Church history from the years 1981 to 1985.	
Before Columbus	1986	14 min.	A documentary approach to how some of the ancient American ruins and artifacts relate to the Book of Mormon.	
Teacher Do You Love Me?	1986	17 min.	A true story about a rebellious boy named Mark who disrupted Primary class. His caring teacher takes time to help him to be a better boy.	
The Power of the Word	1986	30 min.	Part of the "Hold to the Rod" series, volume 7. The power of the Lord's word is compared with other dynamic and subtle powers that are around us every day. The story of Marie and her efforts to use the scriptures to influence an inactive father, a wavering friend, and a Sherem-like antagonist illustrate the power of Scriptures to resist temptation. Filmed at UVSC Orem College (Now UVU) in Orem, Utah. Note: The two World Trade Center towers in New York are featured in this video before they were destroyed on September 11, 2001.	
Lay Hold upon the Word	1986	30 min.	Part of the "Hold to the Rod" series, volume 8. Electrical and spiritual power are compared. Reading for understanding and then applying the scriptures in our own life are essential skills illustrated by this story. Gary's experiences parallel the story of the broken bow in the Book of Mormon.	
A "Mighty Change"	1986	30 min.	Part of the "Hold to the Rod" series, volume 9. Three stories illustrate the role of prayer and scripture study in the process of experiencing a "mighty change" of heart. An analogy is drawn between physical birth and spiritual rebirth.	
All Things Have Their Likeness	1987	15 min.	Part of the "Hold to the Rod" series volume, 10. Two presentations provide visual support for a lesson on interpreting symbolic language in the scriptures. The first presentation, a visual interpretation of the symbols in an ordinance used in Moses' time, emphasizes the elements of blood, ears, hands, and feet. The second presentation focuses on the process of the seed-soil-rain-wheat-flour food chain, which is similar to the revelation-scripture-study-ponder-power-in-your-life chain.	
A Lamp unto My Feet	1987	45 min.	Part of the "Hold to the Rod" series, volume 11. The word of the Lord is light, which has a variable effect upon people according to their individual perception. This presentation is a visual role play of how the scriptures are used (or not used) to provide direction in the lives of Jed Fischer, his sister Brenda, and two of their nonmember friends. This presentation is also the introduction to a series of "look for" comprehension skills. Filmed at Provo High School in Provo, Utah.	
Look to God and Live	1987	30 min.	Part of the "Hold to the Rod" series, volume 12. It focuses on the scriptures as a tool to help those who know about God really come to know him. Kelly Jordan is a young man whose lifestyle is alienating him from his family and from God. With the scriptures as a guide, Kelly's mother and father formulate an unusual plan to help Kelly learn to "look to God and live."	
A Story Of Strength	1987	28 min.	Produced for the sesquicentennial of the Church in the British Isles. Depicts events in the early history of the Church in the British Isles and its strength there today.	
How Rare a Possession	1987	64 min.	The story of Parley P. Pratt's conversion. Also depicts an Italian pastor converted to the Book of Mormon, which he found unidentified with its title torn off. Shows scenes from the Book of Mormon.	
Together Forever	1987	25 min.	A documentary about individuals and families whose lives were improved through the Plan of Salvation.	
What is Real	1989	25 min.	Asks the question about what is exactly real, as a man considers the effect of his life on the future of his family. Is God a critical part of that, or not?	
The Prodigal Son	1990	31 min.	He had made mistakes. Serious mistakes like taking drugs and hanging out with friends who later betrayed him and beat him up. Mistakes that deeply grieved his father and angered his older brother. Then, finally, change occurred after his former friends left him for dead. After months in a rehabilitation center, his return home was a thrill to all. Except his brother. Burdened by Pride and resentment, he disbelieved his prodigal brother's change of heart. The resulting relationship threatened to destroy any hope for peace in the newly reunited family.	
Labor of Love	1990	25 min.	A returning missionary recounts his experiences of sharing the gospel. Portrays what it is like to be a missionary.	
On the Way Home	1992	33 min.	A family grieves after their daughter dies, before learning how they can be reunited through the Plan of Salvation.	
The Lamb of God	1992	27 min.	A depiction of Jesus Christ in the final days in the Passover supper, the suffering in the Garden of Gethsemane, the trail in Jerusalem leading up to his crucifixion on the cross at Calvary, the spirit world and his resurrection from the tomb. Music composed by Kurt Bestor.	
The Maze	1992	10 min.	A teenage competition through a maze is used as an analogy to show how the scriptures help us get through life.	
The Mountain of the Lord	1993	72 min.	Wilford Woodruff recounts the story of the building of the Salt Lake Temple, in a film commemorating the centennial of its dedication.	
Legacy	1993	52 min.	Follows the life and struggles of a small group of early converts to the church, beginning in the eastern United States through their journey and settlement in pioneer Utah.	
The Mediator	1994	11 min.	A portrayal of the analogy Elder Boyd K. Packer used in his April 1977 general conference address. A young man who fails to pay a debt is saved from the grasp of justice through the mediation of a friend.	
Firm In The Faith Of Christ	1994	22 min.	A grandfather tells his grandson a story about Captain Moroni in Ancient America as an example of a true hero. Captain Moroni tells Zerahemnah and his men to repent and depart with a covenant of Peace or be killed. Moroni's faith and loyalty to the Savior provide an example all Saints should follow.	
The Pride Cycle	1994	15 min.	An historical illustration of the great pride of the people of Zarahemla in 1st century BC 20 years before the birth of the Savior. The prophet Nephi condemns the Nephite Judges and calls them fools for corrupting the law. The prophet Nephi foretells the murder of the chief judge as a testimony of the wickedness of the people.	
My Joy Is Full	1994	4 min.	Visuals and music highlight the Savior's visit among the inhabitants of ancient America in the 1st century, providing a unique view of his caring, compassion, and love for his children	
Oh Ye Fair Ones	1994	5 min.	A LDS Church video taking place around the 5th century in Ancient North America in the downfall of the Nephite Nation. As he and his son Moroni behold the hundreds of thousands of Nephites slain in the last great battle with the Lamanites, Mormon laments, "O ye fair ones, how could ye have departed for the ways of the Lord."	
The Touch	1996	10 min.	The "Woman" knew the world had much to offer - except to her. Condemned by the Levitical law that pronounced anyone with an "issue of blood" unclean and untouchable, her life was one of shattered hopes. All she wanted was to be normal, to be loved. But it seemed impossible - everyone around her knew of her twelve-year affliction.	
The Testaments of One Fold and One Shepherd	2000	67 min.	Portrays events that occurred in the Book of Mormon from shortly before Jesus' birth until shortly after His visit to the peoples of the Americas.	
Finding Faith in Christ	2003	30 min.	A depiction of Jesus Christ's life, including the ministry in Jerusalem, his suffering and death on the cross and his resurrection from the tomb.	
Joseph Smith: The Prophet of the Restoration	2005	60 min.	Portrays the life of Joseph Smith, Jr.; released in commemoration of the 200th anniversary of Smith's birth.	
Meet the Mormons	2014	78 min.	Documents the lives of six devout Mormons living across the world. Received a PG MPAA rating, and was distributed by the LDS Church to movie theaters, both firsts for the church.	
The Christ Child: A Nativity Story	2019	18 min.	Released as part of the church's "Light the World" Christmas season initiative, the short film tells the story of the Nativity of Jesus. Unlike many traditional tellings, this film attempted to strip out pageantry and show the event from a more realistic human point of view. It also presented the story with historically accurate details, such as the actors speaking Aramaic, Joseph and Mary staying with Joseph's family in Bethlehem, and the Three Wise Men visiting when Jesus was a toddler.	

== Bible Videos ==
In 2011, the LDS Church began producing a series of live-action adaptations of various stories, titled Bible Videos, which it distributed on its website and YouTube channel.

== Book of Mormon Videos ==
From 2019 through 2024, the church released five seasons of the Book of Mormon Videos, a live-action adaptation of various stories from the Book of Mormon. The series, sometimes called the Book of Mormon Visual Library, was announced in 2016. Its production followed the completion of the Bible Videos series and would follow a similar format. The first two seasons were released in succession beginning in September 2019, followed by season three in March 2020. Season four was released starting in October 2022, while the release of season five was spread throughout 2024. The series was released on the Book of Mormon Videos YouTube Channel, as well as on the church's website and apps, and on DVD.

Filming of the series began in 2017 and was completed by end of 2023, with the COVID-19 pandemic causing a delay in the production of the final two seasons. Filming took place at the LDS Motion Picture Studios in Provo, Utah and at the Jerusalem set on the studio's south campus. Additional filming was done in Hobble Creek Canyon in Utah, along with New York, and the mountains of Kauaʻi, Hawaii.
