= Patricia McGerr =

American novelist

Patricia McGerr (December 26, 1917 – May 11, 1985) was an American crime writer, primarily known for her puzzle mystery novels. She won an Ellery Queen's Mystery Magazine/MWA prize for her 1968 story Match Point in Berlin and was awarded the Grand Prix de Littérature Policière in 1952 for her 1951 novel Follow, As the Night (adapted as the 1954 film Bonnes à tuer, aka One Step to Eternity). Her first novel, Pick Your Victim (1946), was selected as one of the Fifty Classics of Crime Fiction, 1900-1950.

== Life ==
McGerr was born in Falls City, Nebraska and grew up in Lincoln. She attended Immaculata Junior College in Washington D.C. before earning a bachelor's degree at University of Nebraska and a master's degree in journalism at Columbia University.

== Writing career ==
McGerr is principally known for having created a hitherto-unknown twist on the traditional whodunnit. Her best-known novel, Pick Your Victim (1946), tells the story of a small group of American soldiers in an isolated Arctic base who are desperate for reading material and diversion. They find a torn scrap of newspaper which has arrived as the cushioning for a parcel. The torn scrap tells part of the story of a man who has been convicted of a murder, and who is known personally by one of the GIs—the murderer is identified, but the name of the victim has been torn away. The GIs form a betting pool and pump their informant for every bit of information about any potential victim to enable them to better place their bets, and the story told by the informant is the body of the novel. At the end, the name of the victim is revealed.

McGerr's other novels were sometimes ingenious but rarely commercially successful. The Seven Deadly Sisters (1947) attempts a similar inversion of the whodunnit formula, with less success. The reader learns that one of seven sisters has murdered her husband, but which sister is not known until the end. Near the end of her writing career, McGerr created a continuing character, Selena Mead, who became involved in espionage-based plots in and around Washington, D.C.

A television series based on McGerr's Selena Mead short stories was announced by CBS in November 1964. Polly Bergen was signed to play the title character. A fifteen minute presentation film was produced but the series never materialized.

The 1954 French film One Step to Eternity was based on one of her novels. Her short story "Johnny Lingo and the Eight Cow Wife," which appeared in The Australian Women's Weekly in March 1966 has been the base for two other movies : In 1969 Johnny Lingo made by BYU Film Studio and then in 2003 The Legend of Johnny Lingo.

== Works ==
=== Crime Novels ===
- Pick Your Victim (1946)
- The Seven Deadly Sisters (1947)
- Catch Me if You Can (1948)
- Save the Witness (1949)
- Follow as the Night (1950) (aka Your Loving Victim)
- Death in a Million Living Rooms (1951) (aka Die Laughing)
- Fatal in My Fashion (1954)
- Is There a Traitor in the House? (1964) - featuring Selena Mead
- Murder Is Absurd (1967)
- Stranger with My Face (1968)
- For Richer, For Poorer, Till Death (1969)
- Daughter of Darkness (1974)
- Dangerous Landing (1975)

=== Other Novels ===
- Martha, Martha (1960)
- My Brothers, Remember Monica (1964)

=== Short Story Collection ===
- Legacy of Danger (1970) - featuring Selena Mead
