= Man's Search for Happiness =

- Directed by: Judge Whitaker
- Written by: Richard L. Evans; Claire Whitaker; Scott Whitaker
- Produced by: Judge Whitaker
- Starring: Bryce Chamberlain; Richard L. Evans; Francis L. Urry
- Cinematography: Robert Stum
- Edited by: Frank S. Wise
- Music by: Leigh Harline
- Distributed by: The Church of Jesus Christ of Latter-day Saints
- Release date: 1964
- Running time: 13 minutes
- Country: United States
- Language: English

Man's Search for Happiness is a 13-minute film produced by the Church of Jesus Christ of Latter-day Saints (LDS Church). It explains the role of the plan of salvation in Mormon theology, with questions like "Who am I?", "Where did I come from?", and "Where am I going?" being explored from a Mormon perspective.

This film was produced by the BYU Motion Picture Studio for the Mormon Pavilion at the 1964 World's Fair in New York City, and was viewed by over five million people, many of whom were not LDS. It was later remade in Japanese for Expo '70 in Japan. In 1986, the visuals and background music were updated, while retaining the original narration by Richard L. Evans, who served as a member of the church's Quorum of the Twelve Apostles.
