= Wallengren =

Wallengren is a surname. Notable people with the surname include:

- Axel Wallengren (1865–1896), Swedish author, poet, and journalist
- Hans Daniel Johan Wallengren (1823–1894), Swedish clergyman and entomologist
- Orma W. Wallengren, American screenwriter
