= Orma W. Wallengren =

Screenwriter

Orma W. Wallengren, also known as Claire Whitaker and Claire Whitaker Peterson, was the author of the screenplay of Latter-day Saint films Johnny Lingo and Man's Search for Happiness. Under the name of Clair Whitaker she was a writer for several TV shows including The Waltons and Falcon Crest.

Wallengren was the niece of Scott Whitaker and Wetzel Whitaker, the heads of the BYU Motion Picture Studio from about 1950 to 1980.

She was the mother of Ernie Wallengren, Mark Wallengren, and the mother-in-law of John Garbett.
