= Lorenzo Snow =

American LDS Church leader (1814–1901)

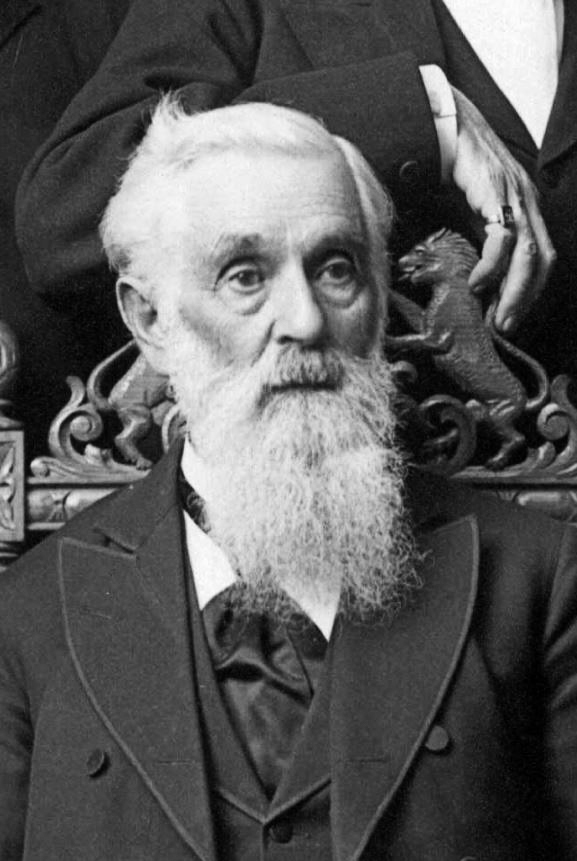
- Snow in 1898

5th President of the Church of Jesus Christ of Latter-day Saints
- September 13, 1898 – October 10, 1901
- Predecessor: Wilford Woodruff
- Successor: Joseph F. Smith

President of the Quorum of the Twelve Apostles
- April 7, 1889 – September 13, 1898
- Predecessor: Wilford Woodruff
- Successor: Franklin D. Richards
- End reason: Became President of the Church

Quorum of the Twelve Apostles
- August 29, 1877 – September 13, 1898
- End reason: Became President of the Church

Assistant Counselor in the First Presidency
- May 9, 1874 – August 29, 1877
- Called by: Brigham Young
- End reason: Dissolution of First Presidency upon death of Brigham Young

Counselor in the First Presidency
- June 8, 1873 – May 9, 1874
- Called by: Brigham Young
- End reason: Called as Assistant Counselor in the First Presidency

Quorum of the Twelve Apostles
- February 12, 1849 – June 8, 1873
- Called by: Brigham Young
- End reason: Called as Counselor in the First Presidency

LDS Church Apostle
- February 12, 1849 – October 10, 1901
- Called by: Brigham Young
- Reason: Reorganization of First Presidency; excommunication of Lyman Wight
- Reorganization at end of term: Hyrum M. Smith ordained

Personal details
- Born: April 3, 1814; Mantua, Ohio, United States
- Died: October 10, 1901 (aged 87); Salt Lake City, Utah, United States
- Resting place: Brigham City Cemetery; 41.5028°N 112.0078°W
- Spouse(s): Charlotte Squires (m. 1844; died 1850) Mary Adaline Goddard (m. 1845; died 1898) Sarah Ann Prichard (m. 1845; died 1900) Harriet Amelia Squires (m. 1846; died 1890) Eleanor Houtz (m. 1848; died 1896) Caroline Horton (m. 1853; died 1857) Mary Elizabeth Houtz (m. 1857) Phoebe Amelia Woodruff (m. 1859) Sarah Minnie Ephramina Jensen (m. 1871)
- Children: 42
- Signature

Lorenzo Snow (April 3, 1814 – October 10, 1901) was an American religious leader who served as the fifth president of the Church of Jesus Christ of Latter-day Saints (LDS Church) from 1898 until his death. Snow was the last president of the LDS Church in the 19th century and the first in the 20th.

== Family ==
Snow was the fifth child and first son of Oliver Snow (September 18, 1775, Massachusetts – October 17, 1845, Illinois) and Rosetta L. Pettibone (October 22, 1778, Connecticut – October 12, 1846, Illinois), residents of Mantua Township, Ohio, who had left New England to settle on a new and fertile farm in the Connecticut Western Reserve. Lorenzo had siblings Leonora Abigail Snow (1801–1872), Eliza R. Snow (1804–1887), Percy Amanda Snow (1808–1848), Melissa Snow (1810–1835), Lucius Augustus Snow (born 1819), and Samuel Pearce Snow (born 1821).

Despite the labor required on the farm, the Snow family valued learning and saw that each child had educational opportunities. Snow received his final year of education at Oberlin College, which was founded by two Presbyterian ministers. Snow later made his living as a school teacher when not engaged in church service.

== Introduction to Mormonism ==
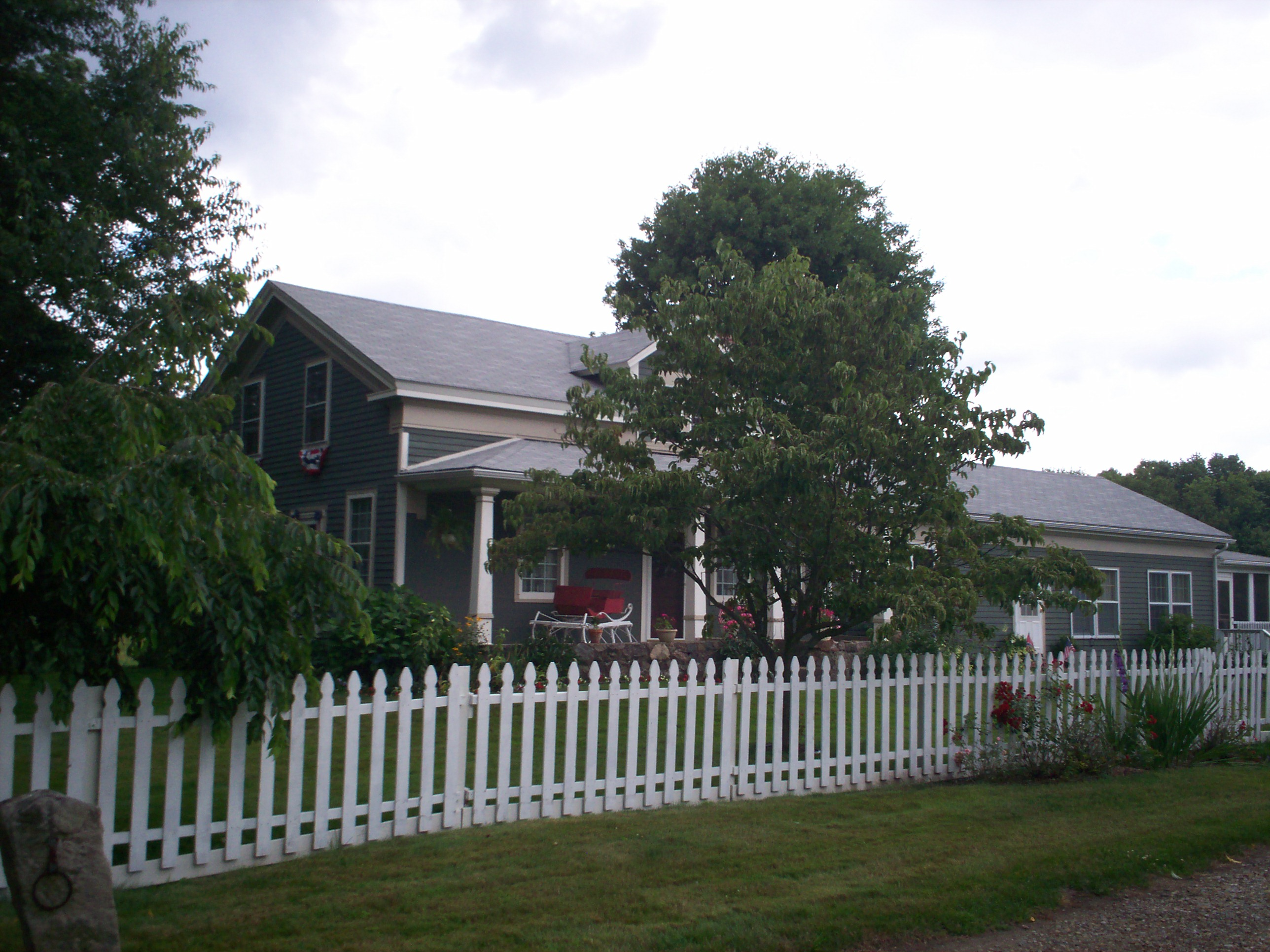
The Snow home in Mantua, Ohio.

In 1831, Joseph Smith, founder of the Latter Day Saint movement, took up residence in Hiram, Ohio, 4 miles (6.4 km) from the Snow farm. The Snow family was Baptist, but soon took a strong interest in the new religious movement. Snow recorded that he heard the Book of Mormon being read aloud in his home in Mantua and met Smith at Hiram in 1831. By 1835, Snow's mother and his older sister, Eliza, had joined the Latter Day Saint church. Eliza soon moved to the church headquarters in Kirtland, Ohio, and worked as a school teacher. In her biography of Snow, Eliza stated she fostered his interest in Mormonism while he was at Oberlin. Eliza invited Snow to visit her and attend a school of Hebrew newly established by the church. During his visit there, in June 1836, Snow was baptized by John F. Boynton, a member of the Quorum of the Twelve.

== Early church service ==
While living in Kirtland in 1837, Snow was called to serve a short mission in Ohio, traveling "without purse or scrip." He recorded that relying on the kindness of others for his meals and lodging was difficult for him, as he had always had sufficient means to care for himself. When he returned to Kirtland in 1838, Snow found Smith's followers in turmoil over the failure of the Kirtland Safety Society. Snow and the members of his extended family chose to move to Missouri in the summer of 1838 and join the Latter Day Saints settling near Far West. Snow became seriously ill with a fever, and was nursed for several weeks by his sister, Eliza.

Following his recovery, Snow left for a second mission to Illinois and Kentucky in the fall of 1838. He served there through February 1839, when he learned that the Latter Day Saints had been expelled from their settlements in Missouri. He traveled home by way of his former mission area in Ohio. He was again taken ill and was cared for by church members. He remained in Ohio, preaching and working with church members until the fall of 1839. During the school year of 1839–40, Snow taught in Shalersville, Ohio. He sent money to his family, who had by then settled in Nauvoo, Illinois; he joined them in May 1840.

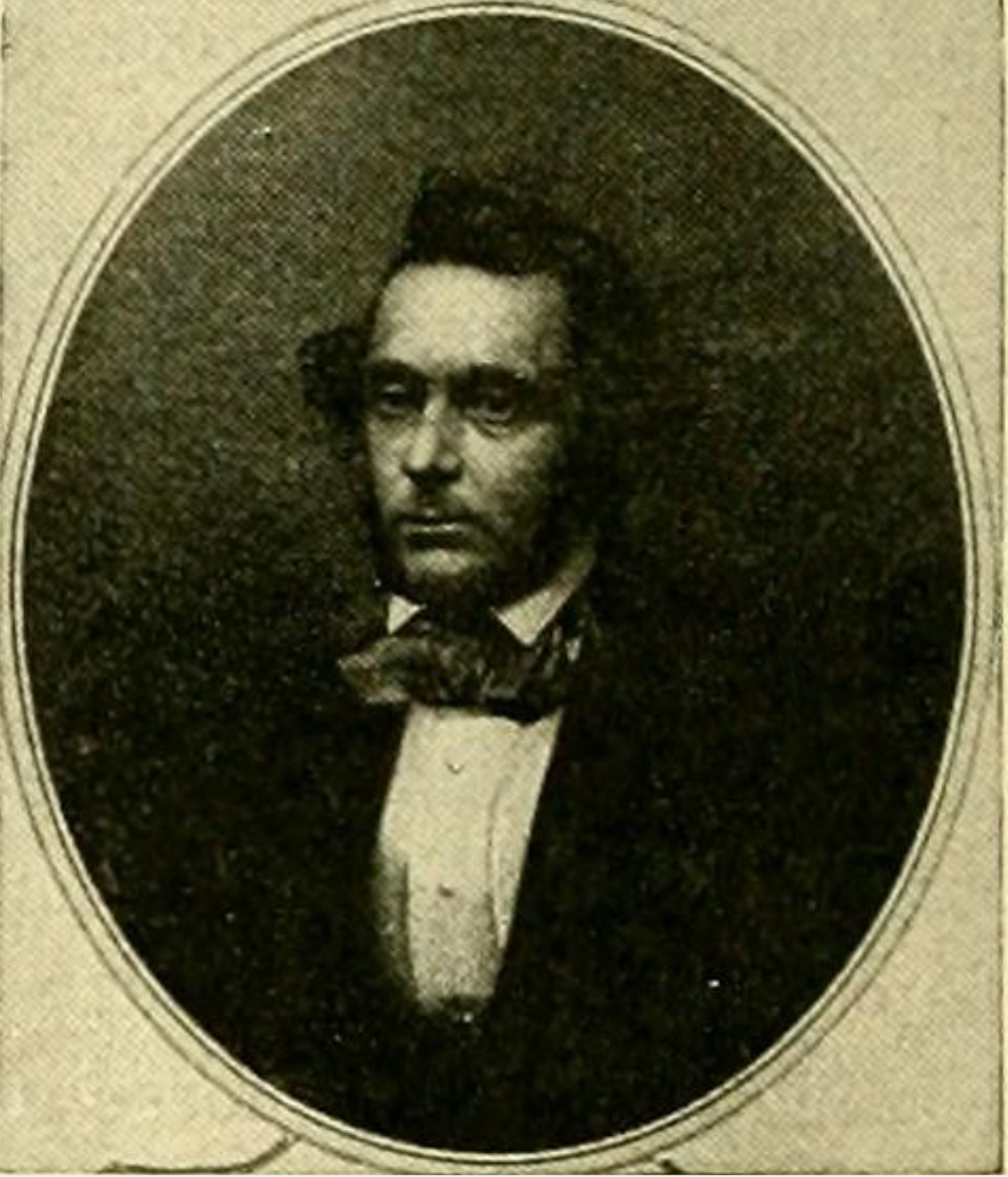
Lorenzo Snow at age 38

Shortly after he arrived in Nauvoo, Snow was called to serve as a missionary in England. After an unpleasant sea voyage from New York City, Snow met with some members of the Quorum of the Twelve who had opened the British Mission in 1839, including Brigham Young, Heber C. Kimball, and Parley P. Pratt. Snow worked briefly in the Manchester area, and had success in Birmingham, where he baptized people in Greet's Green and organized a branch in Wolverhampton. Snow was assigned to preside over church members in London. During his administration, church membership in the city increased from approximately 100 to 400 members. He was released from his mission by Pratt, who by then was president of an expanding European Mission. Snow arrived home on April 12, 1843, and was accompanied by a shipload of 250 British converts.

After visiting with his family, Snow again secured a teaching position for the winter, teaching at Lima, Illinois, thirty miles from Nauvoo. In late spring 1844, he returned to Ohio, preaching and baptizing new converts and distributing recent church publications to members. He was working in Cincinnati when he learned of the death of the Smiths. Snow closed his Ohio mission and promptly returned to Nauvoo.

During the period of disorganization and schism that followed Smith's death, Snow chose to follow the Quorum of the Twelve, under Young's direction. In 1845, Snow was involved in work in the Nauvoo Temple.

== Wives and children ==
Before leaving Nauvoo, Snow accepted the principle of plural marriage and took two wives. Later, he took seven more.

- Mary Adaline Goddard (8 March 1812 Connecticut – 28 December 1898). Married 1845.
  - Rosetta Adaline Snow (7 November 1846 – 1 January 1933)
  - Oliver Goddard Snow (20 February 1849 – 13 August 1931)
  - Isadore Percy Snow (24 February 1855 – 1 May 1925)
- Sarah Ann Pritchard (29 November 1826 Ohio – 30 November 1900). Married 21 April 1845.
  - Eliza Sarah Snow (30 November 1847 – 5 October 1937)
  - Sylvia Snow (16 January 1850 – 2 January 1934)
  - Lorenzo Snow Jr. (7 July 1853 – 26 August 1942)
  - Parinthia Snow (5 October 1855 – 23 November 1933)
  - Laurin Alvirus Erastus Snow (2 December 1863 – 22 April 1947)
- Charlotte Merrill Squires (19 November 1825 Ohio – 25 September 1850). Married 17 January 1846.
  - Leonora Charlotte Snow (23 January 1847 – June 1847)
  - Roxcy Armatha Snow (14 December 1849 – 9 July 1931)
- Harriet Amelia Squires (13 September 1819 Ohio – 12 May 1890). Married 17 January 1846.
  - Abigail Harriet Snow (16 July 1847 – 9 May 1914)
  - Lucius Aaron Snow (11 December 1849 – 3 October 1921)
  - Amelia Herrietta Snow (15 February 1854 – 30 October 1854)
  - Alonzo Henry Snow (15 February 1854 – 1 November 1854)
  - Celestia Armeda Snow (2 December 1856 – 13 March 1938)
- Eleanor Houtz (14 August 1832 Pennsylvania – 13 September 1896). Married 1 June 1848.
  - Amanda Eleanor Snow (19 April 1850 – 21 October 1850)
  - Ida Snow (2 January 1854 – 15 January 1923)
  - Eugenia Snow (5 July 1856 – 13 January 1946)
  - Alphonzo Houtz Snow (13 October 1858 – 22 February 1933)
  - Susan Imogene Snow (4 May 1861 – 16 October 1864)
  - Roxcy Lana Snow (22 October 1863 – 17 July 1951)
  - Hortensia Snow (17 July 1867 – 17 January 1931)
  - Chauncey Edgar Snow (8 July 1870 – 1 February 1940)
- Caroline Horton (25 December 1828 England – 21 February 1857). Married 9 October 1853.
  - Clarissa Caroline Snow (19 July 1854 – 15 October 1917)
  - Franklin Horton Snow (3 February 1857 – 2 January 1939)
  - Sarah Augusta Snow (3 February 1857 – 17 February 1857)
- Mary Elizabeth Houtz (19 May 1840 Pennsylvania – 31 May 1906). Married 1857.
  - Lydia May Snow (21 Jan 1860 – 22 December 1898)
  - Jacob E. Fitzroy Snow (31 October 1862 – 2 December 1862)
  - Virginia Marian Snow (30 January 1864 – 30 March 1951)
  - Mansfield Lorenzo Snow (8 September 1866 – 26 October 1923)
  - Mortimer Joseph Snow (19 November 1868 – 20 June 1935)
  - Flora Bell Birdie Snow (19 July 1871 – 23 February 1950)
- Phoebe Amelia Woodruff (4 March 1842 Nauvoo, Illinois – 15 February 1919). Married 4 April 1859. Phoebe was the daughter of Wilford Woodruff.
  - Mary Amanda Snow (4 September 1860 – 6 September 1860)
  - Leslie Woodruff Snow (6 February 1862 – 28 November 1935)
  - Orion Woodruff Snow (6 September 1866 – 7 March 1939)
  - Milton Woodruff Snow (7 February 1868 – 24 January 1943)
  - Phoebe Augusta Florence Snow (7 August 1870 – 6 February 1964)
- Sarah Minnie Ephramina Jensen (10 October 1855 Brigham City, Utah - 2 January 1908). Married 12 June 1871.
  - Le Roi Clarence Snow (28 August 1876 – 31 December 1962)
  - Minnie Mabelle Snow (23 May 1879 – 3 December 1962)
  - Cora Jean Snow (16 February 1883 – 11 August 1883)
  - Lorenzo Lamont Snow (26 August 1885 – 7 May 1954)
  - Rhea Lucile Snow (5 November 1896 – 9 July 1976)

== Migration to Utah ==
Snow and his family, with wagons and livestock, joined a group of emigrants and moved across the Mississippi River into Iowa in February 1846. On the way west, Snow again became ill and the family stopped at Mt. Pisgah, Iowa. Three Snow children were born at the Mormon refugee settlement, but none of them survived. Snow was called to preside over the church organization in Mt. Pisgah and actively raised money to assist the bands of emigrants in their move west. The Snow family arrived in the Salt Lake Valley in 1848.

== Call to the Twelve and missions abroad ==
In 1849, Snow was called to the Quorum of the Twelve Apostles, the same day as Franklin D. Richards, Erastus Snow (a distant cousin), and Charles C. Rich. They were called to fill vacancies caused by the re-establishment of the First Presidency and Lyman Wight's excommunication.

Shortly after his call to the Twelve, Snow left on a mission to Italy and French-speaking Switzerland. He later sent missionaries under his direction to India (1849–52). Snow was directly involved in missionary work in Italy and Switzerland, and also preached in Malta. He had planned to visit India, but various circumstances prevented this journey.

Snow began his mission in Italy among the Waldensians, an ancient sect of Christians who inhabited the Piedmont Valleys in the Alps. (Waldensianism predates the Reformation by several hundred years and is completely separate from Catholicism.) Snow and his companions, Joseph Toronto, Thomas Stenhouse, and Jabez Woodard, initially had very little success in converting the Waldensians to Mormonism. However, after healing a three-year-old boy named Joseph Gay, they began to find converts. In the end, more than 150 Waldensians converted to Mormonism, and 70 eventually emigrated to Utah.

In 1850, Snow wrote a pamphlet entitled "The Voice of Joseph" to advance missionary work in the Italian mission. He was unable to find anyone in Italy to translate it so sent it to Orson Pratt, then president of the British Mission, who found a translator in Paris. In 1851, Snow published a pamphlet entitled "The Italian Mission" about the church's missionary efforts in Italy. It was published in London.

In January 1851, Snow went to England and found a person there whom he hired to translate the Book of Mormon into Italian.

The efforts of missionaries under Snow, especially those he sent to Turin, inspired an article attacking the Mormon missionaries for undermining the Roman Catholic Church in the Turinese paper, L'Armonia. Snow and his successors were unsuccessful, winning fewer than 200 converts, all of whom had either emigrated or were excommunicated by the time the mission closed in 1867, in no small part because of Italian laws that circumscribed publication of non-Catholic religious materials.

== Activities in Utah ==
On his return to Utah Territory, Snow founded a society called the Polysophical Society to conduct study into the various aspects of human knowledge. He encouraged church members of all ages to join and some view this organization as a predecessor of the church's Young Men's Mutual Improvement Association.

In 1853, under the direction of church president Brigham Young, Snow brought additional settlers to Brigham City, Utah. Settlement had begun on a limited scale at this site under the name "Box Elder." Snow changed the name and moved the community towards living up to its name. He was also a key backer of the Brigham City Cooperative, which was the inspiration for ZCMI and other cooperatives. From this point and for several more years, Snow was both the community and ecclesiastical leader over Brigham City.

In 1864, Snow was sent on a mission to the Sandwich Islands, with Ezra T. Benson and Joseph F. Smith. The mission was prompted by messages from Jonatana Napela and other Hawaiian church members about the irregular administration of the church by Walter M. Gibson. While in Hawaii, Snow was seriously injured but was healed through the ministration of holders of the priesthood.

In 1871, Snow went on a trip to the Holy Land with George A. Smith and several other church leaders.

Snow tacitly helped engineer the 1901 election of his friend, Thomas Kearns, a wealthy Utah Catholic, to the United States Senate. Though this was criticized, both at the time and subsequently, the election of a non-Mormon may have helped Utah retain its statehood, and contributed to a détente between the LDS Church and the non-Mormon journal, the Salt Lake Tribune.

== Political offices ==
Snow was first elected to the Utah Territorial Council, the upper house of the territorial legislature, in 1855. Originally, he represented Weber County, along with Lorin Farr. At that point, Weber County encompassed all of Utah north of Davis County. By 1857, Box Elder County, Cache County and the short-lived Malad County were added to the area Snow and Farr represented. In 1863, Weber and Box Elder Counties were broken off from Cache County (Malad County was by then defunct) and made a single-representative district, with Snow remaining as their lone council member. (Ezra T. Benson had replaced Farr in 1861; he was a resident of Cache County and remained the other representative after the district was split.)

In 1872, Snow became the president of the council. He held this position through the end of 1881. While president of the council, Snow had contact with a political delegation from Japan that visited Utah and influenced his later decision to send missionaries to Japan. In 1882, Snow remained a member of the council but was succeeded as its president by Joseph F. Smith. In 1884, Snow was succeeded as a member of the council by Franklin S. Richards.

== Other activities ==
- Arrested and confined for unlawful cohabitation (1885–86) (Snow was pardoned in 1894 by U.S. President Grover Cleveland.)
- President of the Quorum of Twelve Apostles (1889–98)
- President of the Salt Lake Temple (1893–98). When he became the church's president, Snow was succeeded as temple president by Joseph F. Smith.
- Between April 1901 and his death, Snow served as the general superintendent of the church's Sunday School.

== Activities in Idaho ==
As the church expanded into the surrounding states, members of the Quorum of the Twelve would be sent to other states of assignment.

In 1888, Snow went to Rexburg, Idaho, where he told the leaders of the stake that Karl G. Maeser had been appointed Commissioner of Church Education and recommended that they form a stake academy. The local leaders followed Snow's instructions and the institution they formed eventually evolved into Brigham Young University–Idaho, formerly known as Ricks College.

== Later Church leadership ==
Snow became president of the Quorum of the Twelve in 1889. In 1893, he became the first president of the Salt Lake Temple, a position he held until his death. There is a tradition that shortly after Snow's death some of his relatives burned a trunk full of documents including some of his journals and other records, which means historians have less direct insight on Snow and his thoughts than some would like.

As president of the Quorum of the Twelve, Snow managed to bring a group of men who were often at odds over politics, especially at a time when the church had decided to proactively embrace a two party system, and through his peace making skills make them into a unified quorum.

After Wilford Woodruff issued his Manifesto of September, 1890 announcing that the church would not sanction additional plural marriages, it was Snow who offered the motion at the October 6th General Conference that the members of the church accept the Manifesto as authoritative and binding.

== Snow in the U.S. Supreme Court ==
Snow was the subject of a United States Supreme Court case regarding polygamy prosecutions under the Edmunds Act. In late 1885, Snow was indicted by a federal grand jury for three counts of unlawful cohabitation. According to his indictments, Snow had lived with more than one woman for three years. The jury delivered one indictment for each of these years, and Snow was convicted on each count. After conviction, he filed a petition for writ of habeas corpus in the federal district court which convicted him. The petition was denied, but federal law guaranteed him an appeal to the United States Supreme Court. In Ex Parte Snow, the Supreme Court invalidated Snow's second and third convictions for unlawful cohabitation. It found that unlawful cohabitation was a "continuing offense," and thus that Snow was at most guilty of one such offense for cohabiting continuously with more than one woman for three years.

== Actions as church president ==
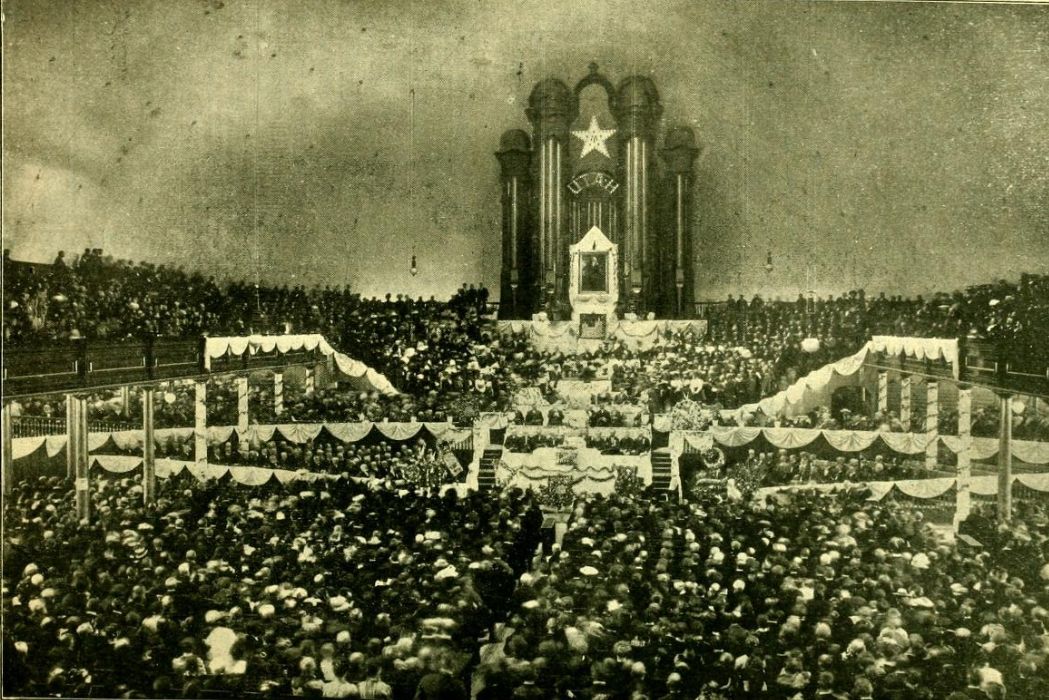
Lorenzo Snow funeral, Sunday, October 13, 1901

As President of the Quorum of Twelve Apostles, Snow became the church's presiding officer when its president, Wilford Woodruff, died. One of the first things he did was to reorganize the First Presidency almost immediately after Woodruff's death, rather than waiting years as his predecessors had.

As he began his tenure as church president, Snow had to deal with the aftermath of legal battles with the United States over the practice of plural marriage. Men engaging in plural marriage were still being arrested and confined in Utah. Some members of the LDS Church did not accept the 1890 Manifesto put forth by Woodruff, and there was a strong division of opinion on plural marriage even in the priesthood hierarchy of the church.

The LDS Church was also in severe financial difficulties, some of which were related to the legal problems over plural marriage. Snow approached this problem first by issuing short term bonds with a total value of one million dollars. This was followed by emphatic teaching on tithing. It was during Snow's presidency that the LDS Church adopted the principle of tithing—being interpreted as the payment of 10 percent of one's income—as a hallmark of membership.

In 1899, Snow gave an address at the tabernacle in St. George, imploring the Latter-day Saints to pay tithes of corn, money, or whatever they had. Eventually, it rained in southern Utah. For the remainder of his tenure, Snow emphasized tithing in his sermons and public appearances. By April 1907, the practice of its members paying tithing had eliminated the church's debt.

On March 31, 1900, Snow and his counselors in the First Presidency, changed the policy of presidential succession. Under the then-existing rules of presidential succession in the church, John Willard Young would have become church president when Snow died, as Snow was the only living person who had been ordained an apostle prior to Young. Snow was 85 years old and in poor health, so it appeared to many that Young would be the next president of the church. However, many of the general authorities felt that Young's succession to the presidency would be a disaster for the church. Under the new policy, the new president of the church would no longer be the person who had been an ordained apostle the longest; rather, the new president of the church would be the person who had been a member of the Quorum of the Twelve Apostles for the longest period of time. Since Young had never been a member of the Quorum of the Twelve, he could not become the president of the church if Snow died. On April 5, 1900, the First Presidency and the Quorum of the Twelve unanimously approved the new policy.

Snow died of pneumonia in Salt Lake City at age 87, and was succeeded as church president by Joseph F. Smith.

== LDS doctrine and teachings ==
Snow is credited with succinctly summarizing the Latter-day Saint doctrines of exaltation and eternal progression, in his often repeated couplet: "As man now is, God once was: As God now is, man may be."

Snow's teachings as an apostle were the 2013 course of study in the LDS Church's Relief Society and Melchizedek priesthood classes.

== Portrayal in film ==
The role of Snow was played by Francis L. Urry in the LDS Church–distributed film The Windows of Heaven.

== Notes ==
The Church of Jesus Christ of Latter-day Saints titles
Preceded by Wilford Woodruff	President of the Church; September 13, 1898 – October 10, 1901	Succeeded by Joseph F. Smith
Preceded by Wilford Woodruff	President of the Quorum of the Twelve Apostles; April 7, 1889 – September 13, 1898	Succeeded by Franklin D. Richards
Preceded by Charles C. Rich	Quorum of the Twelve Apostles; February 12, 1849 – September 13, 1898	Succeeded by Erastus Snow
Preceded by Wilford Woodruff	Superintendent of the Young Men's Mutual Improvement Association; 1898–1901	Succeeded by Joseph F. Smith
