= Pioneers in Petticoats =

- Directed by: Judge Whitaker
- Written by: Joyce Evans; Carol Lynn Pearson
- Produced by: Judge Whitaker
- Starring: Melinda Cummings; Jillanne Duce; Jim French
- Cinematography: Robert Stum
- Edited by: Frank S. Wise
- Distributed by: The Church of Jesus Christ of Latter-day Saints
- Release date: 1969
- Running time: 44 minutes
- Country: United States
- Language: English

Pioneers in Petticoats is a 44-minute film produced by BYU Motion Picture Studios and distributed by the Church of Jesus Christ of Latter-day Saints. It was commissioned for the centennial of the founding of the Young Women's Mutual Improvement Association. In it, the main character, Abigail Harper, is chosen as the local president of the Young Women's Retrenchment Society and finds her values challenged.
