= The Windows of Heaven (film) =

- Directed by: Wetzel Whitaker
- Written by: Richard Neil Evans; Scott Whitaker
- Produced by: Wetzel Whitaker
- Starring: Francis L. Urry; John B. Fetzer; Rowena Miller; Lethe Tatge; Alonzo J. Morley; Grant Graff
- Cinematography: Robert Stum
- Edited by: Frank S. Wise
- Music by: Crawford Gates
- Production company: BYU Motion Picture Studio
- Distributed by: The Church of Jesus Christ of Latter-day Saints
- Release date: March 13, 1963
- Running time: 50 minutes
- Country: United States
- Language: English

The Windows of Heaven is a 1963 film about Lorenzo Snow, the fifth president of the Church of Jesus Christ of Latter-day Saints (LDS Church). The film was directed and produced by Wetzel Whitaker with the screenplay by Scott Whitaker and Richard Neil Evans. Francis L. Urry played the role of Lorenzo Snow.

== Plot summary ==
The film follows Snow as he tries to resolve the church's mounting debt and the struggles of the Mormon settlers suffering through a drought. In the film, Snow prophesies to the people of St. George, Utah, that they will be able to harvest their crops if they obey the law of tithing.

== Production ==
The prophecy that Snow gives in the film is based on articles written by his son LeRoi C. Snow, 35 to 40 years after the events of the film occurred. Contemporary historical records do not support that Snow made the prophecy depicted in the film; instead, he promised generalized prophetic blessings for obeying the law of tithing. The depiction of rain in St. George is mostly historically accurate, with a reported rainfall of 1.89 inches during that time. However, the rainfall caused extensive damage and contemporary church leaders did not connect it to the payment of tithing.

The film was produced and released while the LDS Church was in a financial crisis, starting the 1950s. The First Presidency and Quorum of the Twelve Apostles examined and approved the film's script. Filming began in 1962 and the general authorities approved the released version.

== Reception ==
Upon its release, The Windows of Heaven was the longest and most publicized film produced by BYU. It premiered in St. George and was well-received among LDS Church members, including church president David O. McKay. The film was cut from 50 minutes to 32 in a 1979 for video release. A 10-minute version of the film was included in the 2006 three-disc DVD compilation on LDS Church history.
