= Cipher in the Snow =

- Directed by: Keith J. Atkinson
- Written by: Jean Mizer Todhunter
- Screenplay by: Carol Lynn Pearson
- Produced by: Judge Whitaker; Keith J. Atkinson
- Starring: Robert Bridges; Bruce Kimball; Roberta Shore; Jacqueline Mayo; Walter Stocker; Mary Cox; Larry Watts; Martha Henstrom; Kirk Hutchings; Ronald Jenkins; Court LeRoy
- Cinematography: Reed Smoot; Ted Van Horn; W. Grant Williams
- Edited by: Peter G. Czerny
- Release date: 1973
- Running time: 21 minutes
- Country: United States
- Language: English

Cipher in the Snow is a short story written by Jean Mizer Todhunter about the death of an ostracized teenager. It was later made into a short film by Brigham Young University in 1973.

== Background ==
Cipher in the Snow, written by Jean Mizer Todhunter (as Jean Mizer), an Idaho teacher, counselor and guidance director, was first published Volume 50 of the NEA Journal in 1964. It won first prize in the first Reader's Digest/NEA Journal writing competition and received a reprint in Today's Education in 1975.

BYU Motion Picture Studios made a short film based upon the story in 1973. The film was produced by Wetzel Whitaker and Keith Atkinson, with a screenplay by Carol Lynn Pearson. A DVD of the film is available through BYU's Creative Works Office. Both the film and the story have since been used in moral education as part of anti-bullying initiatives.

== Synopsis ==
The true story is about an ostracized teenager, Cliff Evans, who, following the move-in of his stepfather, becomes a completely withdrawn and friendless "cipher". Then, on a school bus, he asks to be let off, and collapses and dies in the snow near the roadside. His literature teacher (the author, Jean Mizer) is asked to notify his parents and write the obituary. Though listed as Cliff's favorite teacher, Mizer hardly knew him. After getting a delegation to go to the funeral – it's impossible to find ten people who knew him well enough to go – Mizer resolves never to let this happen to another pupil. The author feels that Cliff's death due to heart failure had a root cause of repeatedly being told he is worthless, and feeling unloved.

== Effects on education ==
The Journal of Developmental Disabilities quotes it in an article on training teachers to resist allowing students to go unnoticed.
