= The Legend of Johnny Lingo =

- Directed by: Steven Ramirez
- Written by: Riwia Brown; John Garbett
- Produced by: John Garbett; Gerald R. Molen
- Starring: George Henare; Rawiri Paratene; Joe Folau
- Cinematography: Allen Guilford
- Edited by: Steven Ramirez
- Music by: Kevin Kiner
- Production company: Turtles Crossing LLC
- Distributed by: Innovation Film Group
- Release date: 29 August 2003
- Running time: 92 minutes
- Country: New Zealand
- Language: English

The Legend of Johnny Lingo is a 2003 film set in Polynesia and directed by Steven Ramirez. An extension of the 1969 short film Johnny Lingo, it is also based on a story by Patricia McGerr, "Johnny Lingo's Eight Cow Wife".

== Plot ==
An orphaned baby boy is found in a beached canoe after a great storm and is adopted by Mailo, the island chief. Malio declares his intent to raise the baby, who he names Tama, as his heir, even though he already has a son. The chief's wife begins to spread rumors that Tama is sent from the trickster god to cause trouble. After a string of unlucky incidents causes Malio to conclude that Tama is cursed, he becomes an outcast, passed from family to family around the island. At one point, a drunk villager, Pioi, takes Tama in. He has a daughter named Mahana who is considered ugly by the other islanders. Even though she is ill-treated by her father and the people around her, she remains kind and good and befriends Tama. One day, Tama, disgusted with life in Pioi's household and his status as an outcast, decides to leave the island in a canoe he built. Before departing, he promises Mahana that he will come back and care for her.

Caught in a violent storm, Tama drifts ashore on an island which proves to be the home of a well-known and respected Polynesian trader, Johnny Lingo. Though Johnny is kind and welcoming, Tama's years of rejection have made him suspicious, particularly of Johnny's gruff chief steward, and he decides to leave. After stealing jewellery from Johnny's treasury and trying to escape, he is sentenced to work for Johnny for the next seven years to pay off his debt. He invents some simple machines that enable him to finish his work faster and, through his diligence, earns Johnny's respect.

Eight years later, Johnny decides that a now adult Tama is ready to accompany him to a nearby island to conclude an important trade. During the course of their reception, Tama accidentally offends the people of the island and they take Johnny hostage, demanding payment for Tama's offense. Tama single-handedly navigates back to Johnny's home to obtain a cow from his herd for the ransom, winning the trust of the chief steward in the process. Johnny, Tama, and the chief steward are invited to be the guests of honour at the chief's son's wedding, where Tama learns that he is actually the heir to the chiefdom of a neighbouring island. He initially accepts the chiefdom but eventually decides that he is happier working for Johnny. After they return to his home, Johnny confides to Tama that he is dying and leaves to him his name and fortune.

As the new Johnny Lingo, Tama sends the chief steward ahead of him to Malio's island to determine what has happened to Mahana. He then arrives himself, announcing that he intends to choose a bride from among the island's young women. A great feast is planned for that night so that he can meet them all. That night, all are present at the feast except Mahana. Tama goes to Pioi's home looking for her, but she meets him on the way and rejects him, not recognizing him as the boy who had left so many years earlier. The next day, he meets her again and she tells him that every day for eight years, she has waited at the island's shore for Tama to return, but that she believes he lied about coming back and now hates him. Unwilling to give up, Tama announces that he will barter with Pioi to marry Mahana.

At the bartering ceremony, Pioi, whose health has deteriorated badly, asks for two cows as Mahana's dowry, which would be the richest dowry in the history of the islands. Tama, however, offers eight cows instead. Mahana is furious, thinking Tama is mocking her, and she storms out of the bartering ceremony. Outside, though, are the eight cows. While Pioi rejoices over his new fortune, Mahana confronts Tama, demanding to know why he offered such a high price. Believing that she no longer loves him as Tama and openly hates him as Johnny Lingo, Tama releases her from the bridal agreement and tells her to keep the cows and use the fortune to care for her father. However, Mahana realises that Tama is wearing the armband she had given him when he left the island as a boy. Finally recognizing him, she feigns anger at his long absence and slaps him, but they then embrace happily. The film concludes with Tama relating the story to a writer, surrounded by his happy family.

== Cast ==
- George Henare – Johnny Lingo
- Rawiri Paratene – Malio Chief
- Joe Folau – Tama
- Alvin Fitisemanu – Chief Steward
- Kayte Ferguson – Mahana
- Peter Sa'ena-Brown – Miriama's Father
- Hori Ahipene – Pioi
- Jim Perry – Malio Elder
- Sima Urale – Hoku
- Goeretti Chadwick – Malio Seductress
- Tausani Simei-Barton – Young Tama
- Fokikovi Soakimi – Young Mahana

== Reception ==
In a review in Video Store Magazine, Anne Sherber called the film an "oddity" despite its charm and "funny moments" recalling The Gods Must Be Crazy. She said that while The Legend of Johnny Lingo was appropriate for family viewing, children may not know what to make of it because it feels like it belongs to "a completely different era".
