= MaKee K. Blaisdell =

American actor (1931–1988)

Blaisdell Makee
- Born: MaKee Kalaikinipeakapalekaikalawaiaopuna Blaisdell; November 15, 1931; Territory of Hawaii
- Died: February 20, 1988 (aged 56); Ventura County, California, U.S.
- Other names: Blaizdell Makee; Blaisdel Makee
- Occupation: Actor

MaKee Kalaikinipeakapalekaikalawaiaopuna Blaisdell (November 15, 1931 – February 20, 1988), also known as Blaizdell or Blaisdell Makee, was an American actor on television, film, and stage. He was best known for playing Sergeant Alika, a recurring character in the television series Hawaiian Eye. He also played the title character in the short film Johnny Lingo (1969), which was part of the LDS Seminary curriculum for many years.

== Early life and education ==
Born and raised in Honolulu, Hawaii, Blaisdell was a high school athlete, surfer, and captain of the swim team. He graduated from Farrington High School in 1949. He was a second cousin of Mayor Neal Blaisdell.

At Brigham Young University, he initially majored in physical education and was voted one of the 10 "most preferred" men on campus. He ultimately received his bachelor's degree in theatre arts from BYU. In the late 1950s, he was selected as BYU actor of the year.

== Career ==
Makee had minor roles in two 1966 films, Paradise, Hawaiian Style starring Elvis Presley and The Last of the Secret Agents?

He also acted on TV, with a recurring role as Sergeant Alika in Hawaiian Eye, and appeared on Star Trek, The Big Valley, Ironside, and F-Troop. He also appeared in Daniel Boone, Mission: Impossible, and Whale Rider.

His stage roles included playing John Buchanan in Summer and Smoke by Tennessee Williams with Honolulu Community Theater. He later performed with the Shakespeare Society of America in plays such as The White Devil by John Webster.

== Filmography ==
Year	Title	Role	Notes	Refs
1961–1962	Hawaiian Eye	Sergeant Alika		
1966	Paradise, Hawaiian Style	Pua's Escort	Uncredited	
1966	The Last of the Secret Agents?	King	Uncredited	
1967	Star Trek	Ship Officer	Episodes: "The Changeling" and "Space Seed"	
1969	Johnny Lingo	Johnny Lingo	Short, none	
1971	The Bold Ones	Matthew	NBC-TV movie	
1971	The Cult	Invar	(final film role)	

== Personal life and death ==
While living in Hawaii, Blaisdell sold securities for Trans Pacific Underwriters. He died of heart failure in Ventura County, California, in 1988.

== Sources ==
- LDS film bios
- Paul Skousen. Brother Paul's Mormon Bathroom Reader. (Springville, Utah: Cedar Fort, Inc., 2005) p. 169.
