= Wetzel Whitaker =

American Mormon filmmaker (1908–1985)

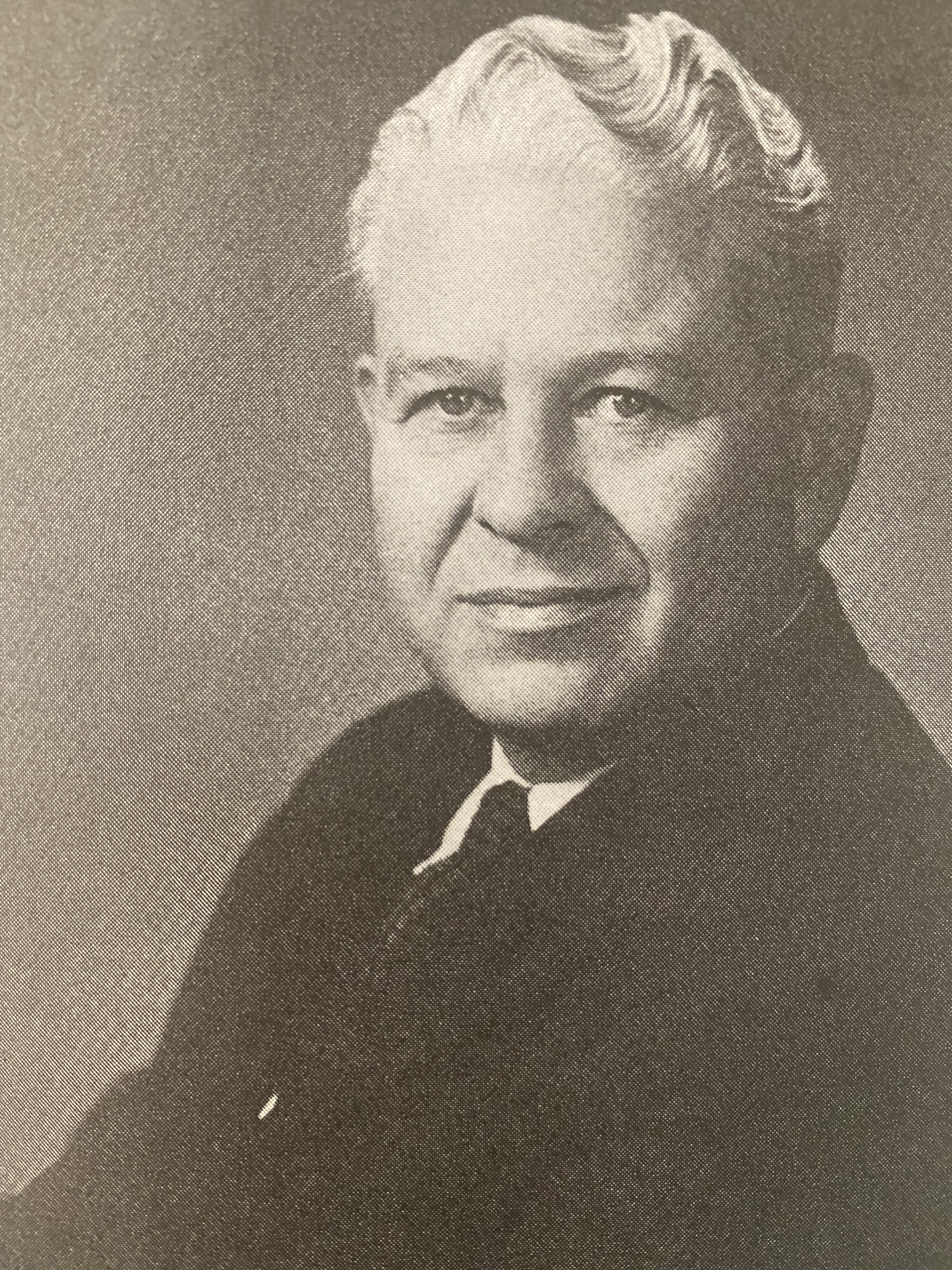
- Born: September 30, 1908; Heber City, Utah, U.S.
- Died: November 1, 1985 (aged 77); Murray, Utah
- Occupations: Producer; Director; Animator
- Years active: 1939-1980

Wetzel Orson "Judge" Whitaker (September 30, 1908 – November 1, 1985) was a filmmaker and animator. He is most known for his early work as a Disney animator, particularly the animation of the stepsisters from Cinderella, and his work as a director for BYU Motion Picture Studios. Most of the films he was involved in, such as The Windows of Heaven, Johnny Lingo and Pioneers in Petticoats, were made in cooperation with his brother Scott Whitaker. The two of them ran the BYU Motion Picture Studio during this time, receiving commission from the Church of Jesus Christ of Latter-day Saints to make films.

== Biography ==
Wetzel "Judge" Whitaker was born in Heber City, Utah and grew up primarily in Utah and Colorado. His nickname came from his brother calling him "Judge", comparing him to the local justice of the peace.

He attended the Art Institute of Chicago and in 1929 became the Art Director for the St. Louis Times. In 1930, Judge married Doris Youkstetter and a few years later had his first child during the Great Depression. In 1932, Judge moved his family to California where he worked for the Charles Mintz Studios and then Disney Studios. In 1953, Judge Whitaker left his job at Disney and went on to direct the BYU Motion Picture Studio. In 1971, he was given an honorary doctorate by BYU. A few months after receiving his honorary doctorate from BYU, Judge Whitaker's wife, Doris, died and in 1973 Judge remarried his childhood friend, Louise Eccles. He retired from his work at the motion picture studio in 1974.

== Disney Studios ==
In 1932 during the Great Depression, Judge was laid off from his job at the paper. With no job, and a young wife and newborn baby to provide for, he began to work freelance jobs to make ends meet. While working as a freelance artist Judge met Walt Pfeiffer, a childhood friend of Walt Disney. Judge had never heard of Walt Disney before but, after learning about this 'up-and-coming' young man, decided to move to California and apply to work for Disney Studios. Judge was initially hired as a "trainee" animator, but after winning a competition among the new animators to animate a new Disney character, Donald Duck, he became a full-fledged animator. While working for Disney, Judge was part of projects such as Cinderella, Peter Pan and Alice in Wonderland.

== BYU Motion Picture Studio ==
In 1945, Judge Whitaker was asked by leaders in the Church of Jesus Christ of Latter-day Saints to create a film on the Church Welfare Program. Judge recruited fellow Church members from Disney to help him with the project. These men consisted of Eric Larson, W. Cleon Skousen, John Lewis and Scott Whitaker. This small council of men began work on two films for their Church, Church Welfare in Action and The Lord's Way, which debut in Salt Lake City, UT in 1948.

In 1952, Judge requested a year long leave of absence from Disney to spend time with his family in Utah. During this leave of absence, President Ernest L. Wilkinson created the Department of Motion Picture Production at BYU and offered Judge the opportunity to head the new department. Judge accepted his offer and in January 1953 began organizing the new department on campus. In 1971, Judge Whitaker was given an honorary doctorate by BYU.

== Filmography ==
=== Animator ===
- The Autograph Hound (1939)
- Officer Duck (1939)
- Pinocchio (1940)
- Donald's Dog Laundry (1940)
- Mr. Duck Steps Out (1940)
- Put-Put Troubles (1940)
- Donald's Vacation (1940)
- Window Cleaners (1940)
- Fantasia (1940)
- Fire Chief (1940)
- Timber (1941)
- The Reluctant Dragon (1941)
- Early To Bed (1941)
- Truant Officer Donald (1941)
- Dumbo (1941)
- Chef Donald (1941)
- Donald's Snow Fight (1942)
- Donald Gets Drafted (1942)
- The Vanishing Private (1942)
- Sky Trooper (1942)
- Bellboy Donald (1942)
- Fall Out Fall In (1943)
- Trombone Trouble (1944)
- Donald Duck and the Gorilla (1944)
- Contrary Condor (1944)
- Commando Duck (1944)
- Donald's Off Day (1944)
- The Cold-Blooded Penguin (1945)
- The Clock Watcher (1945)
- The Eyes Have It (1945)
- Donald's Crime (1945)
- No Sail (1945)
- A Knight for a Day (1946)
- Make Mine Music (1946)
- Peter and the Wolf (1946)
- Lighthouse Keeping (1946)
- Frank Duck Brings 'Em Back Alive (1946)
- Straight Shooters (1947)
- Clown of the Jungle (1947)
- Crazy with the Heat (1947)
- Bootle Beetle (1947)
- Fun and Fancy Free (1947)
- Melody Time (1948)
- Tea for Two Hundred (1948)
- Honey Harvester (1949)
- All in a Nutshell (1949)
- The Adventures of Ichabod and Mr. Toad (1949)
- The Greener Yard (1949)
- Slide, Donald, Slide (1949)
- Lion Around (1950)
- Cinderella (1950)
- Crazy Over Daisy (1950)
- Food for Feudin' (1950)
- Bee at the Beach (1950)
- Chicken in the Rough (1951)
- Corn Chips (1951)
- Alice in Wonderland (1951)
- Lambert the Sheepish Lion (1952)
- Let's Stick Together (1952)
- Peter Pan (1953)
- Gay Purr-ee (1962)
- Quacker Tracker (1967)
- The Spy Swatter (1967)
- Mickey Mouse Disco (1980)

=== Producer/director ===
- Church Welfare in Action (1948)
- The Lord's Way (1948)
- A Teacher is Born (1955)
- How Near to the Angels (1956)
- The Decision (1957)
- Feed My Sheep (1957)
- Up in Smoke (1960)
- 'Til Death Do Us Part (1960)
- Time Pulls the Trigger (1960)
- Shannon (1961)
- Worth Waiting For (1962)
- The Search for Truth (1962)
- Measure of a Man (1962)
- Summer of Decision (1962)
- The Windows of Heaven (1963)
- Of Heaven and Home (1963)
- Bitter Wind (1963)
- Man's Search for Happiness (1964)
- No More a Stranger (1964)
- How Do I Love Thee? (1965)
- Love is for the Byrds (1965)
- Losers Weepers (1965)
- The Long Road Back (1965)
- And Should We Die (1966)
- Marriage: What Kind For You? (1967)
- Are You the One?: Choosing a Mate (1967)
- The Three Witnesses (1968)
- When Thou Art Converted (1968)
- Walk in Their Shoes (1968)
- In This Place (1968)
- Worthy to Stand (1969)
- Johnny Lingo (1969)
- Never a Bride (1969)
- Pioneers in Petticoats (1969)
- A Day for Justin (1970)
- What About Thad? (1970)
- Are You Listening? (1971)
- Cipher in the Snow (1973)
- The Lost Manuscript (1974)
- Ancient America Speaks (1974)
- A Different Drum (1974)
- Follow Me (1983)
