= Johnny Lingo =

- Title Card
- Directed by: Wetzel Whitaker
- Written by: Orma W. Wallengren
- Based on: "Johnny Lingo and the Eight-Cow Wife" by Patricia McGerr
- Produced by: Wetzel Whitaker
- Starring: MaKee K. Blaisdell; Naomi Kahoilua; Francis L. Urry
- Cinematography: Robert Stum
- Edited by: Frank S. Wise
- Production company: Brigham Young University
- Distributed by: The Church of Jesus Christ of Latter-day Saints
- Release date: 1969
- Running time: 24 minutes
- Country: United States
- Language: English

Johnny Lingo is a 1969 short film directed by Wetzel O. Whitaker. The film and later remake are based on a short story by Patricia McGerr, originally published in a 1965 issue of Woman's Day. The 24-minute film was produced by Brigham Young University, but does not specifically mention The Church of Jesus Christ of Latter-day Saints (LDS Church) outside of the credits.

== Plot ==
In the story, Johnny Lingo (played by MaKee K. Blaisdell) is a shrewd, honest, and well-liked Polynesian trader. Johnny has come home to bargain for a wife. Mahana (played by Naomi Kahoilua), the young woman he desires, is considered by her neighbors and even her father, Moki (played by Joseph Ah Quin), to be of little value—sullen, ugly, and undesirable. Blaming himself for not paying enough cows for Mahana's mother, her father treats her unkindly, such as yelling, "Mahana, you ugly!" As the bargaining is about to begin, women of the island brag about how many cows their husbands had paid for each of them (see bride price), and comment that Mahana's father will be lucky to be offered one cow for her.

The bargaining begins, and Moki asks Johnny Lingo for three cows, as Moki's counselor Me Hai advises. The islanders laugh derisively, then wait for Lingo to make his counter-offer, certain that he will make a devastating bargain. Johnny, pondering the offer, pronounces that "three cows are many... but not enough for Mahana!" He then offers the unheard-of price of eight cows for her hand in marriage. After the bargaining, Johnny visits Mr. Harris, an American shopkeeper on the island, to offer him a valuable shell in exchange for a mirror. In their conversation, Mr. Harris is convinced that Johnny only paid so much to look good and be remembered. The next day, Moki and Me Hai, while waiting for Johnny to deliver the cows, convince themselves that Johnny reconsidered his deal and will not show up. In the end, Johnny brings the cows and marries Mahana that night, enduring some mocking for paying so much for a seemingly undesirable wife while Moki revels in his newfound prosperity. Johnny and Mahana then leave the island for many months on their honeymoon, visiting many islands.

When they return, Harris discovers, to his astonishment, that Mahana is a beautiful, happy woman. Johnny recounts that Mahana's father had just accused Lingo of cheating him by saying, "[Mahana] is worth ten cows, if she's worth a hoof!" Johnny then explains that he has loved Mahana since they were children, and that he paid eight cows for Mahana, not to show off, but to make her happy and for her "to be an eight-cow woman." Johnny concludes with "Many things can happen to make a woman beautiful, but the thing that matters most is what she thinks of herself." Johnny leaves Harris, and he and Mahana walk on the beach together.

== Cast ==
- Makee K. Blaisdell - Johnny Lingo
- Naomi Kahoilua - Mahana
- Francis L. Urry - Trader Harris
- Joseph Ah Quin - Moki
- Joseph R. TeNgaio - Me Hai, Moki's Counselor
- Malofou Maumasi - Tulo

== Production ==
The film was based on the 1965 short story, "Johnny Lingo and the Eight-Cow Wife", written by author Patricia McGerr and published in Woman's Day magazine. The story has been frequently reprinted, including in The Australian Women's Weekly, The Instructor, and Reader's Digest, as well as by assorted books and websites (sometimes condensed or attributed to other authors). In the short story, told from the perspective of a visitor to the fictional Pacific islands of "Kiniwata" and "Nurabandi" while on leave from assignment in Japan, the character of Mahana is instead named "Sarita", while her father is referred to as "Sam Karoo."

Filmed in Hawaii in November 1968 and featuring mostly local LDS Church members, the film was directed by Wetzel O. ("Judge") Whitaker, then head of the Brigham Young University's Department of Motion Picture Production. Whitaker stated that "the setting is mythical to give it universal appeal" and the village set was constructed by two BYU (then Church College of Hawaii) students, Tuione Pulotu and Vuna Fa, to not be identifiable as belonging to any particular island group. LaMar Williams, head of the audio-visual section of the LDS Church Missionary Department, commented that "The Church is only mentioned in the production credits so it is a film that could be put on coast to coast television."

== Influence and remake ==
The film is licensed by Covenant Communications, and is sold on DVD by Brigham Young University's Creative Works Office.

The 1993 book Hana, the No-Cow Wife continues the story and shows its effect on another, somewhat prideful young woman.

In the summer of 2001, the Salt Lake Acting Company staged a live parody performance of Johnny Lingo as that year's episode of their annual theatrical spoof series Saturday's Voyeur. The act was titled Mahana, You Ugly.

A 2003 remake of this film called The Legend of Johnny Lingo was directed by Steven Ramirez and financed by the Utah-based Tahitian Noni International.

== Criticism ==
Johnny Lingo has been criticized as having strong elements of sexism and colonialism. The film has been criticized for "[hinging] on the idea that a woman’s self-esteem is based on the price she commands in a financial transaction between men, not on any internal sense of who she is." Rather than being recognized as “industrious”, or any other personal characteristic, Lingo notes, after he has paid eight cows for Mahana, "she now knows, she is worth more than any other woman on the island". Writer Holly Welker comments further, “[the movie] does not view the buying and selling of women as property as essentially or inherently wrong.”
