= Puzzle mystery =

The puzzle mystery is a subgenre of detective fiction where the emphasis is on the "whodunnit" aspect. The entire novel or film is oriented to the puzzle and its solution, and characterization takes a distinctly secondary place.
