= Francis L. Urry =

American actor

- Born: January 23, 1908
- Died: May 6, 1985 (aged 77)
- Occupations: Stage, film actor

Francis L. Urry (January 23, 1908 – May 6, 1985) was a Utah-based prominent radio, stage, and film actor. He was a member of The Church of Jesus Christ of Latter-day Saints. He is best known for his work in the films Johnny Lingo, Uncle Ben, and The Windows of Heaven. He was also the male narrator of the Mormon Miracle Pageant.

== Biography ==
Born in Salt Lake City, Urry was the son of Herbert Henry and Jane Elizabeth Maxwell Urry.

In 1929, Urry began working with the Salt Lake City Civic Opera, and in 1936 he joined the staff of radio station KSL in Salt Lake City, Utah. Urry began his performing career as a private teacher in 1937. He worked for several years for CBS radio before returning to his birthplace and working for KSL. In 1943, he joined the staff of KUTA radio. He eventually began working on network television and radio, in addition to work in live theater. Instead of relocating to New York or Los Angeles, Urry chose to base his career out of Utah because he wanted to raise his family there. Much of his work involved films produced by Brigham Young University. Urry's most visible role is probably that of the small store owner on a Polynesian island in the film Johnny Lingo. He also played the role of Lorenzo Snow in The Windows of Heaven.

Urry taught speech at McCune School for Music and Art in addition to teaching drama privately.

On November 11, 1936, Urry married Virginia Carroll.
