= LDS Motion Picture Studios =

American entertainment company

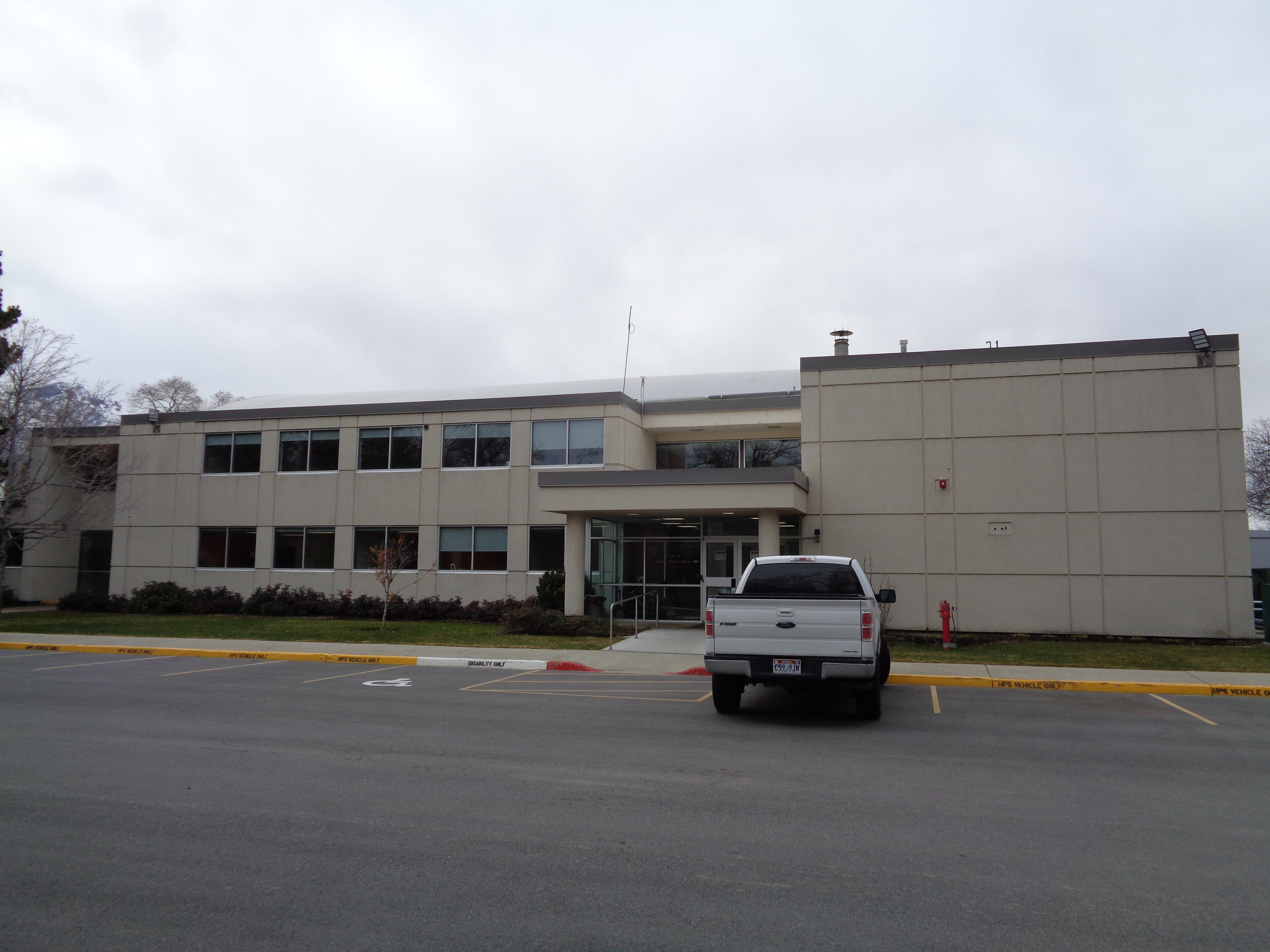
- LDS Motion Picture Studios, Provo, Utah
- Company type: Division
- Industry: Entertainment-Education
- Predecessor: BYU Motion Picture Studio Brigham Young University
- Founded: January 1, 1991; 35 years ago
- Founders: Wetzel Whitaker
- Headquarters: Provo, Utah, U.S.
- Area served: Worldwide
- Products: Films; Television; Publishing

LDS Motion Picture Studios (MPS) is a film studio based in Provo, Utah, and is a directly-managed division of the Church of Jesus Christ of Latter-day Saints (LDS Church).

The MPS is part of the LDS Church's media production division, which includes producers, editors, animators, sound stages, editing bays, and a collection of 19th-century buildings on a backlot.

== History ==
It began as the Brigham Young University (BYU) MPS in 1953, led by Wetzel Whitaker. LDS Church president David O. McKay worked with Ernest L. Wilkinson and others to open the studio, appointing Whitaker as head. Originally the studio was located in a building called the Green Barn where BYU's student center is now located.

During Whitaker's 22-year term at the MPS, a host of films were created. Some were privately funded, but most were created at the request LDS Church departments.

In 1991, the MPS separated from BYU and became a directly-operated function of LDS Church, as part of the church's Audio Visual Department.

=== MPS South Campus ===
The MPS South Campus, in Elberta, Utah, was approved by the church's First Presidency in 2010 and construction began on a set of biblical Jerusalem. Elberta, population less than 1,000, was chosen because of the surrounding area's similarity to Jerusalem's geography—hills, plains, cedar trees, and a stream.

Lynn G. Robbins, executive director of the church's Media Services Department, was instrumental in the creation of the MPS South Campus.

In 2013, the LDS Church released several scenes of Jesus Christ's life that were filmed there as part of the New Testament film project.

In 2017, production started on a visual library producing a series of films from the Book of Mormon.

=== Fire at the MPS building ===
In 2014, a morning fire, caused when an electrical box exploded on top of the studio, resulted in power outage and a fire. Occupants evacuated the building, the Provo City Fire Department soon put out the fire, and no injuries were reported.

== See also ==
- Johnny Lingo
- The Mailbox
- The Testaments of One Fold and One Shepherd
- Category:Films produced by the Church of Jesus Christ of Latter-day Saints

== Additional reading ==
- Hollstein, Lynne (9 September 1978), "BYU studio celebrates 25 years of filmmaking", Church News, pp. 5–6
- Johnson, Peter N. (1992), "Motion Pictures, LDS Productions", in Ludlow, Daniel H (ed.), Encyclopedia of Mormonism, New York: Macmillan Publishing, pp. 964–965, ISBN 0-02-879602-0, OCLC 24502140.
- Astle, Randy (2013), "Mormons and Cinema", in Hunter, James Michael (ed.), Mormons and Popular Culture: the global influence of an American phenomenon, Santa Barbara, California: Praeger (ABC-CLIO), ISBN 9780313391675, OCLC 776495102
- Hall, Airen (October 2012), "Melodrama on a Mission: Latter-Day Saint Film and the Melodramatic Mode", Journal of Religion and Film, 16 (2)
