= The Last Best Place =

Unofficial nickname of Montana

The Last Best Place is an unofficial nickname for the U.S. state of Montana. The phrase's origin is disputed. The first known use is in Douglas Chadwick's book A Beast the Color of Winter, while William Kittredge is credited with popularizing it as the title of his book The Last Best Place: A Montana Anthology.

== History ==
The first known use of the term was by biologist Douglas Chadwick in his book A Beast the Color of Winter. Chadwick argued against allowing hydrocarbon exploration in the Bob Marshall Wilderness, writing "I managed to envision industrializing the Bob. But I couldn't accept it. Not here. Not in the last, best place."

The term was popularized as the title of The Last Best Place: A Montana Anthology, written by William Kittredge and Annick Smith and published in 1990. Kittredge claims to have created the phrase independently, while Chadwick claims that Kittredge's use of the phrase was inspired by his own. The phrase became popular among Montanans, a geographically large state with a small population and expansive undeveloped wilderness.

=== Trademark controversy ===
David E. Lipson, a Las Vegas businessman, bought a ranch in Greenough, and built a resort. Lipson attempted to register a trademark for the term "The Last Best Place" to market his resort, as well as his other businesses. This attempt was met with widespread outrage from Montanans, including Governor Brian Schweitzer and Senator Max Baucus, as well as Kittredge, the original coiner of the term.

Senator Conrad Burns introduced a bill to prevent the term from being registered as a trademark in 2004, but Lipson won a lawsuit to overturn the law. Afterwards, Baucus introduced stronger legislation, banning the phrase from being registrable as a trademark.

== Usage ==
The term is widely used as an endearing term by Montanans to refer to their state.

In 2018, Annick Smith (one of the authors of The Last Best Place: A Montana Anthology) published an article asking if Montana is "still the last best place", discussing various ways Montana has changed since 1990, as well as issues such as climate change, the opioid epidemic and the decline of Montana's "Wild West" culture.

== See also ==
- List of Montana state symbols
