= The Edge (1997 film) =

American survival film by Lee Tamahori

- Theatrical release poster
- Directed by: Lee Tamahori
- Written by: David Mamet
- Produced by: Art Linson
- Starring: Anthony Hopkins; Alec Baldwin; Elle Macpherson; Harold Perrineau
- Cinematography: Donald McAlpine
- Edited by: Neil Travis
- Music by: Jerry Goldsmith
- Production company: Art Linson Productions
- Distributed by: 20th Century Fox
- Release dates: September 6, 1997 (TIFF); September 26, 1997 (United States)
- Running time: 117 minutes
- Countries: United States; Canada
- Language: English
- Budget: $30 million
- Box office: $43.3 million

The Edge is a 1997 survival thriller film directed by Lee Tamahori, written by David Mamet, and starring Anthony Hopkins and Alec Baldwin. The plot follows wealthy businessman Charles Morse (Hopkins), photographer Bob Green (Baldwin), and assistant Stephen (Harold Perrineau), who must trek through the elements and try to survive after their plane crashes in the Alaskan wilderness, all while being hunted by a large Kodiak bear and the men's fraying friendships. Bart the Bear, a trained Kodiak bear known for appearances in several Hollywood films, appears in the film as the bloodthirsty Kodiak, in one of his last film roles.

The Edge premiered at the 1997 Toronto International Film Festival on September 6, 1997, and was released in theaters in the United States on September 26, 1997, by 20th Century Fox. The film received mixed to positive reviews from critics and grossed $43.3 million worldwide against a $30 million budget.

== Plot ==
Billionaire Charles Morse, photographer Robert "Bob" Green, and Bob's assistant Stephen arrive at a remote Alaskan resort with Charles's wife Mickey, a model, and a team of photographers. During a surprise birthday party, Mickey gives Charles a watch, while Bob gives him a pocket knife.

At a photo shoot, Charles observes Bob and Mickey flirting. Short on time and missing a model, Bob decides to seek out Jack Hawk, a local hunter. Charles, Bob and Stephen fly to Hawk's home, only to find a note on his door that indicates he is miles away hunting. They fly toward his location, but the plane strikes a flock of birds and nose-dives into a lake, killing the pilot. Charles, Bob, and Stephen escape the sinking plane and reach the shore.

The men gather wood for a fire and spend the night by the lake. The next morning, they hike south but encounter an enormous male Kodiak bear that gives chase. Bob saves Charles as they flee over a log bridge, leaving Charles in doubt over his earlier suspicions that Bob was planning to kill him for Mickey. The group goes in a circle and ends up back at the lake. Distraught, Stephen distracts himself by carving a spear to fish with and accidentally stabs his leg. That night, the bear, having caught the scent of Stephen's blood, finds their camp and attacks and devours Stephen.

Charles and Bob hear a rescue helicopter fly above. They run after it but fail to flag it down, and tensions rise when Bob expresses his disgust with Charles and his wealth. They then resolve to walk back to civilization and abandon the remote hope of being found.

After hiking for some time, Charles and Bob reach a creek. Charles is ambushed by the bear and falls back to the campsite Bob is putting together. The bear stalks them throughout the night. Charles realizes that as long as this persists, they will be unable to forage for essentials, and he decides that they have to kill the bear in order to survive. The following day, the pair lure the bear into a trap and engage it in a battle with spears. The bear wounds Bob, but Charles stabs it and the bear advances on him. It rears and collapses on Charles's spear, impaling itself. Charles and Bob feast and celebrate afterwards.

The two later come across an empty cabin along a river. Charles notices a pit trap (erroneously referred to as a deadfall in the film) outside. Inside are supplies, including a canoe, a rifle, and ammunition. As Bob checks if the canoe is usable, Charles finds a receipt from the box he kept his knife in to use as tinder. The receipt contains information confirming his suspicions about Mickey's infidelities with Bob. Charles subtly confronts Bob, who reveals that he plans to kill Charles for Mickey. Armed with a rifle, Bob orders Charles to go outside, but before he is able to shoot him, Bob falls into the pit trap and is badly injured. Charles refuses to kill Bob and rescues him from the pit to tend to his wounds. They go downriver in the canoe together.

Bob apologizes for betraying Charles and says Mickey was unaware that he intended to murder him. A helicopter appears, and Charles attracts its attention, but Bob succumbs to his wounds just as the helicopter approaches. Brought back to the lodge, Charles reveals to his wife that he is aware of her betrayal by handing her Bob's wristwatch, an incriminating gift Mickey had given to Bob. When questioned by the press on how his companions died, Charles emotionally states, "They died saving my life."

== Cast ==
- Anthony Hopkins as Charles Morse
- Alec Baldwin as Bob Green
- Harold Perrineau as Stephen
- Elle Macpherson as Mickey Morse
- L.Q. Jones as Styles
- Kathleen Wilhoite as Ginny
- David Lindstedt as James
- Mark Kiely as Mechanic
- Eli Gabay as Jet Pilot
- Larry Musser as Amphibian Pilot
- Gordon Tootoosis as Jack Hawk
- Kelsa Kinsly as Reporter
- Bart the Bear as the Kodiak bear

== Production ==
The Edge was directed by New Zealand-born Lee Tamahori, who first gained attention with his locally made film Once Were Warriors (1994). He followed that up with his U.S. debut Mulholland Falls, which was released in 1996. The Edge began principal photography on August 19, 1996. Footage was taken primarily in Alberta. Among the Alberta locations were Banff National Park, Canmore, Edmonton, Thunderstone Quarries, Fortress Mountain Resort and Allarcom Studios. Additional scenes were shot in Yoho National Park and Golden both in British Columbia. Filming ended on November 22, 1996.

The shooting of the film is discussed by Art Linson in his 2002 book What Just Happened?, later made into a film starring Robert De Niro. Initially called Bookworm, the script was turned down by Harrison Ford and Dustin Hoffman before Alec Baldwin settled on the role of Green. De Niro showed some interest in the role of Morse, but ultimately declined. Baldwin's unwillingness to shave a beard that he had grown for the role is reenacted by Bruce Willis in Barry Levinson's adaptation of Linson's book.

Like many other actors who had worked with Bart the Bear, Baldwin was impressed with how well-trained and docile the bear was. In interviews, he revealed that during filming he was concerned that the film simply would not work because of how docile Bart was. After the film was completed, Baldwin commented that Bart "should send the film editor a fruit basket every day for making him look so scary." As for Hopkins, who had worked with Bart in Legends of the Fall, he "was absolutely brilliant with Bart," according to trainer Lynn Seus, who went on to say that Hopkins "acknowledged and respected (Bart) like a fellow actor. He would spend hours just looking at Bart and admiring him. He did so many of his own scenes with Bart."

Three months before the film was to be released, the studio felt Bookworm needed a more commercial title. Dozens of others were considered, according to Linson, until the film was renamed The Edge.

The film features Australian model Elle MacPherson, who had begun doing film acting roles a few years prior. After completing her role in The Edge, she had a smaller role in Batman & Robin, although that film would be released in June 1997, three months before The Edge was. In a 2004 interview, she said that she never had any ambitions to become an actress, and did films like The Edge while she was taking a temporary break from modeling. MacPherson also said she enjoyed the experience of working with Anthony Hopkins, describing him as "such a gentleman" in 2004.

The Edge was shot in Alberta, Canada, in freezing conditions. Elle Macpherson was required to perform one long scene in a Native American get-up of beads, feathers and suede loincloth. "You rehearse with a coat on and then you have to take the coat off," she said. "It feels the coldest under your arms. You don't want to ever uncover your arms again."

== Music ==
The film's musical score was composed by Jerry Goldsmith, who worked closely with director Lee Tamahori to develop a score more diverse than other works by Goldsmith in the 1990s. Initially, the score was released on CD in 1997, upon the film's release, by RCA Records. Over time, the first release went out of print, leading to La-La Land Records issuing a limited 3500-unit pressing of the complete score, which was also out of print by July 2013. The new release contains 25 minutes of unreleased music and fixes a problem found on the RCA release affecting the track "Rescued," which contained rustling noises during some quieter parts.

The Edge: Original Motion Picture Soundtrack

Soundtrack album by Jerry Goldsmith
- Released: September 30, 1997 (RCA); June 15, 2010 (L-LL)
- Genre: Film score
- Length: 38:04 (1997); 66:15 (2010)
- Labels: RCA Records (1997); La-La Land Records (2010); Fox Music (2010)
- Producer: Jerry Goldsmith

Jerry Goldsmith chronology
L.A. Confidential (1997)	The Edge: Original Motion Picture Soundtrack (1997)	Deep Rising (1998)

Professional ratings
Review scores
Source	Rating
Filmtracks	link

RCA Records track list:

1. Lost In The Wild (3:01)
2. The Ravine (4:38)
3. Birds (2:24)
4. Mighty Hunter (1:34)
5. Bitter Coffee (3:03)
6. Stalking (5:47)
7. Deadfall (6:15)
8. The River (2:21)
9. Rescued (6:04)
10. The Edge (2:57)

La-La Land Records track list:

1. Early Arrival (1:32)*
2. Lost In The Wild(s) (2:59)
3. A Lucky Man/Open Door (1:41)* (does not include the final orchestral outburst as the "bear" bursts through the door, which only lasts for a few seconds)
4. Mighty Hunter (1:31)
5. The Spirit (0:36)*
6. Birds (2:22)
7. The Fire / Breakfast (2:31)*
8. Rich Man (0:58)*
9. The Ravine (4:36)
10. Bitter Coffee (3:01)
11. Wound (1:38)*
12. Stephen's Death (2:26)* (contains an unused ending from 1:45 onwards)
13. The Cage / False Hope / No Matches (3:34)* (contains crossfades between the three cues, although they are separated in the film)
14. Stalking (5:46)
15. Deadfall / Bear Fight (6:21)
16. The Discovery / Turn Your Back (5:01)* (contains a brief alternate segment at 1:34 – 1:46)
17. The River (2:26)
18. Rescued (6:03)
19. End Title (Lost In The Wild)(s) (1:59)*
20. The Edge (2:55)

Bonus tracks:

1. False Hope (Alternate Take) (1:08)* (alternate of 0:56 – 2:00 of track 13, with more percussion and an additional brass melody)
2. Rescued (Film Version Ending) (1:19)* (alternate ending of track 18, reflecting the film version)
3. The Edge (Alternate Take) (3:00)* (alternate recording of track 20)

* = Previously unreleased

== Release ==
=== Theatrical release ===
The Edge had its premiere at the Toronto International Film Festival in Canada on September 6, 1997. It was released in the U.S. on September 26, 1997, in 2,351 theaters, and grossed $7.7 million during its opening weekend. It went on to gross $27.8 million in the U.S. and $15.4 million overseas, for a worldwide total of $43.3 million in its theatrical run.

=== Home media and rights ===
In the US, 20th Century Fox Home Entertainment initially released The Edge on VHS on February 24, 1998. The Edge was then released on a non-anamorphic widescreen NTSC DVD in the US on May 25, 1999. This 1999 DVD release had no extras, save the original theatrical trailer. Meanwhile, PAL DVDs released in Europe, Australia, etc. feature an anamorphic transfer, the trailer, a six-minute featurette, seven short cast and crew interviews and five text biographies. The Region 4 Australian DVD was released in 2001 by 20th Century Fox Home Entertainment South Pacific. The British Region 2 DVD release occurred in 2002, with the film being reissued on DVD in the UK in 2011, with new artwork. In 1998, the film also received LaserDisc releases in Hong Kong and Japan, along with a domestic LaserDisc release.

As of 2017 (for its 20th Anniversary), the film has also been released on Blu-ray in the US and Germany, with the same extras as each country's DVD.

In 2019, Rupert Murdoch sold most of 21st Century Fox's film and television assets to The Walt Disney Company, and The Edge was one of the films included in the deal. There have not been any further home video products released for the film since Disney acquired the rights.

== Reception ==
Upon release, The Edge received mixed to positive reviews from critics. Based on 49 reviews collected by Rotten Tomatoes, the film received a 63% approval rating, with an average score of 6.4/10. The consensus reads, "The Edge is an entertaining hybrid of brainy Mamet dialogue with brawny outdoors action—albeit one that sadly lacks as much bite as its furry antagonist." Metacritic, which uses a weighted average, assigned the film a score of 66 out of 100, based on 29 critics, indicating "generally favorable" reviews.

Roger Ebert of the Chicago Sun-Times gave the film 3 out of 4 stars, writing Mamet's script featured his usual double-dealing characters and incisive dialogue, managed to subtly satirize action film cliches while also being an effective thriller, while Tamahori's direction "doesn’t lose its mind and go berserk with action in the last half hour". Ebert did criticize the ending, however, saying that:

Having successfully negotiated almost its entire 118 minutes, The Edge shoots itself in the foot. After the emotionally fraught final moments, just as we are savoring the implications of what has just happened, the screen fades to black and we immediately get a big credit for Bart the Bear. Now Bart is one helluva bear (I loved him in the title role of The Bear), but this credit in this place is a spectacularly bad idea.
