= The Bear (1988 film) =

French adventure family film

- North American theatrical film poster
- Directed by: Jean-Jacques Annaud
- Written by: Gérard Brach
- Based on: The Grizzly King by James Oliver Curwood
- Produced by: Claude Berri
- Starring: Bart the Bear; Youk the Bear; Tchéky Karyo; Jack Wallace; Andre Lacombe
- Cinematography: Philippe Rousselot
- Edited by: Noëlle Boisson
- Music by: Philippe Sarde
- Production companies: Price Entertainment; Renn Productions
- Distributed by: AMLF (France); Tri-Star Pictures (United States and Canada)
- Release date: 19 October 1988
- Running time: 94 minutes
- Country: France
- Language: English
- Budget: 120 million Franc ($20 million)
- Box office: $31,753,898 (U.S. and Canada) $100+ million (worldwide)

The Bear (French: L'Ours) is a 1988 French English-language adventure family film directed by Jean-Jacques Annaud and released in North America by Tri-Star Pictures. Adapted from the novel The Grizzly King (1916) by American author James Oliver Curwood, the screenplay was written by Gérard Brach. Set in British Columbia, Canada, the film tells the story of an orphaned grizzly bear cub who befriends a large adult male Kodiak bear as two trophy hunters pursue them through the wild.

Several of the themes explored in the story include orphanhood, peril and protection, and mercy toward and on the behalf of a reformed hunter. Annaud and Brach began planning the story and production in 1981, although filming did not begin until six years later, due to the director's commitment to another project. The Bear was filmed almost entirely in the Italian and Austrian areas of the Dolomites, with live animals—including Bart the Bear, a trained 2.74-metre (9.0 ft) tall Kodiak bear—present on location. Notable for its almost complete lack of dialogue and its minimal score, the film was nominated for and won numerous international film awards.

== Plot ==
In 1885, in the mountainous wilds of British Columbia, Canada, a grizzly bear cub and his mother are searching for honey when the mother is crushed to death by a rockslide. Forced to fend for himself, the cub struggles to find food and shelter.

Elsewhere in the mountains, a male Kodiak bear roams, unknowingly pursued by two trophy hunters: Tom and Bill. Tom shoots the Kodiak, but his gunshot grazes the bear's shoulder and the wounded animal flees. Shortly after, Tom and Bill discover two of their three horses missing; Bill finds one horse disemboweled, and Tom finds the other one seriously wounded. Bill vows to kill the bear.

The cub encounters the Kodiak, who refuses his companionship; he persists, and is later allowed to lick the bear's wound. A friendship forms between the two, with the Kodiak teaching the cub how to catch salmon and hunt mule deer. While journeying through the mountains, the Kodiak and the cub come across a female grizzly; the two fully-grown bears perform courtship displays and eventually mate.

The Kodiak and the cub are tracked down again by the two hunters, now joined by a third man, his pack of Beaucerons, and Tom's Airedale Terrier. While the cub hides in a cave, the Kodiak fights the dogs, killing two Beaucerons and mortally wounding Tom's terrier. He escapes over a pass with the remaining dogs giving chase. Tom is stricken by the sight of the dying terrier, and Bill administers a coup de grâce. The hunters spot the lone cub and capture him, taking him back to their camp where he is tethered to a tree and tormented by the men and their dogs.

The next day, the hunters split up, with Tom manning a spot high on a cliff. Finding his canteen empty, he leaves his post and gun to wash up in a small waterfall, where the Kodiak confronts him. The bear menaces Tom into submission with roars and posturing, but ultimately spares him and walks away. A shaken Tom recovers his gun and chases after the Kodiak; he aims, but relents and fires into the air, encouraging the Kodiak to flee. Bill, alerted by the gunshot, joins Tom, who lies that the bear is dead. When Bill catches sight of the bear, he raises his rifle to shoot; Tom pulls the rifle down and silently insists they let the animal go free. The three hunters return to their camp, release the cub, and ride away.

Alone again, the cub is stalked by a cougar, who corners him near a stream. The Kodiak returns and scares away the cougar. As winter approaches, the bears find shelter in a cave and begin to hibernate.

== Cast ==
- Bart the Bear as Kodiak bear
- Youk the Bear as Bear cub
- Tchéky Karyo as Tom Wallace
- Jack Wallace as Bill Wallace
- Andre Lacombe as Dog hunter

== Production ==
=== Sources ===
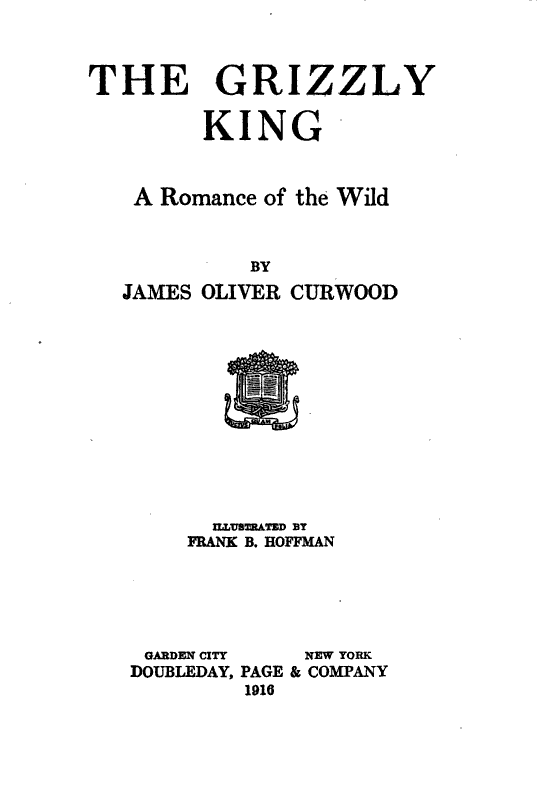
Frontispiece of James Oliver Curwood's The Grizzly King (1916)

American author James Oliver Curwood's novella The Grizzly King was published in 1916. The story was based on several trips he took to British Columbia, and the young hunter, called Jim in the book, is based on Curwood himself. However, many of its plot elements—mainly dealing with the friendship between the bear cub and the adult male grizzly—were fabricated. Curwood's biographer, Judith A. Eldridge, believes that the incident in which the hunter is spared by a bear is based on truth, a fact that was later related to Jean-Jacques Annaud. He stated during an interview that he "was given a letter from Curwood's granddaughter revealing that what happened in the story happened to him. He was hunting bear, as he had done often, and lost his rifle down a cliff. Suddenly, a huge bear confronted him and menaced him, but for reasons Curwood could never know, spared his life." Shortly after the book's publication, Curwood—once an adamant hunter—became a supporter of wildlife conservation.

Brach and Annaud decided to set the film in the late 19th century to create a perception of true wilderness, especially for the human characters. In addition, while both the bears and the two hunters are named in the script, only Tom is named in the film. The bear cub is referred to in the script as Youk, and the adult male grizzly is known as Kaar. Tchéky Karyo's character is said to have been called Tom and Jack Wallace's is Bill. These names differ from Curwood's novel; for example, the cub is known as Muskwa in the novel, and his adult companion is called Thor.

=== Development ===
After the commercial success of Jean-Jacques Annaud's previous films, including the Academy Award-winning Black and White in Color (1976) and Quest for Fire (1981), producer Claude Berri offered to produce Annaud's next project, no matter the cost. The French filmmaker had first considered the idea of making a film that included mammal communication through behavior, rather than language, while working on Quest for Fire. He became particularly interested in making an animal "the star of a psychological drama", so he "decided to do an entertaining, commercial adventure and psychological film" that would have an animal hero. He discussed this idea with his longtime collaborator, screenwriter Gerard Brach, who within a few days sent Annaud a copy of The Grizzly King, to which the filmmaker quickly agreed.

Although Brach began writing the screenplay in late 1981, Annaud took on another project, that of directing a film adaptation of Umberto Eco's book The Name of the Rose. Between preparing for and filming his next film, Annaud traveled and visited zoos in order to research animal behavior. In an interview he later gave with the American Humane Association, Annaud stated: "Each time I was fascinated with the tigers, to a point that I thought to do a movie called The Tiger instead of The Bear. In those days I felt that the bear, because they're so often vertical, would give me a better identification, or would provide more instant identification from the viewers." The finished script was presented to Berri in early 1983.

=== Filming ===
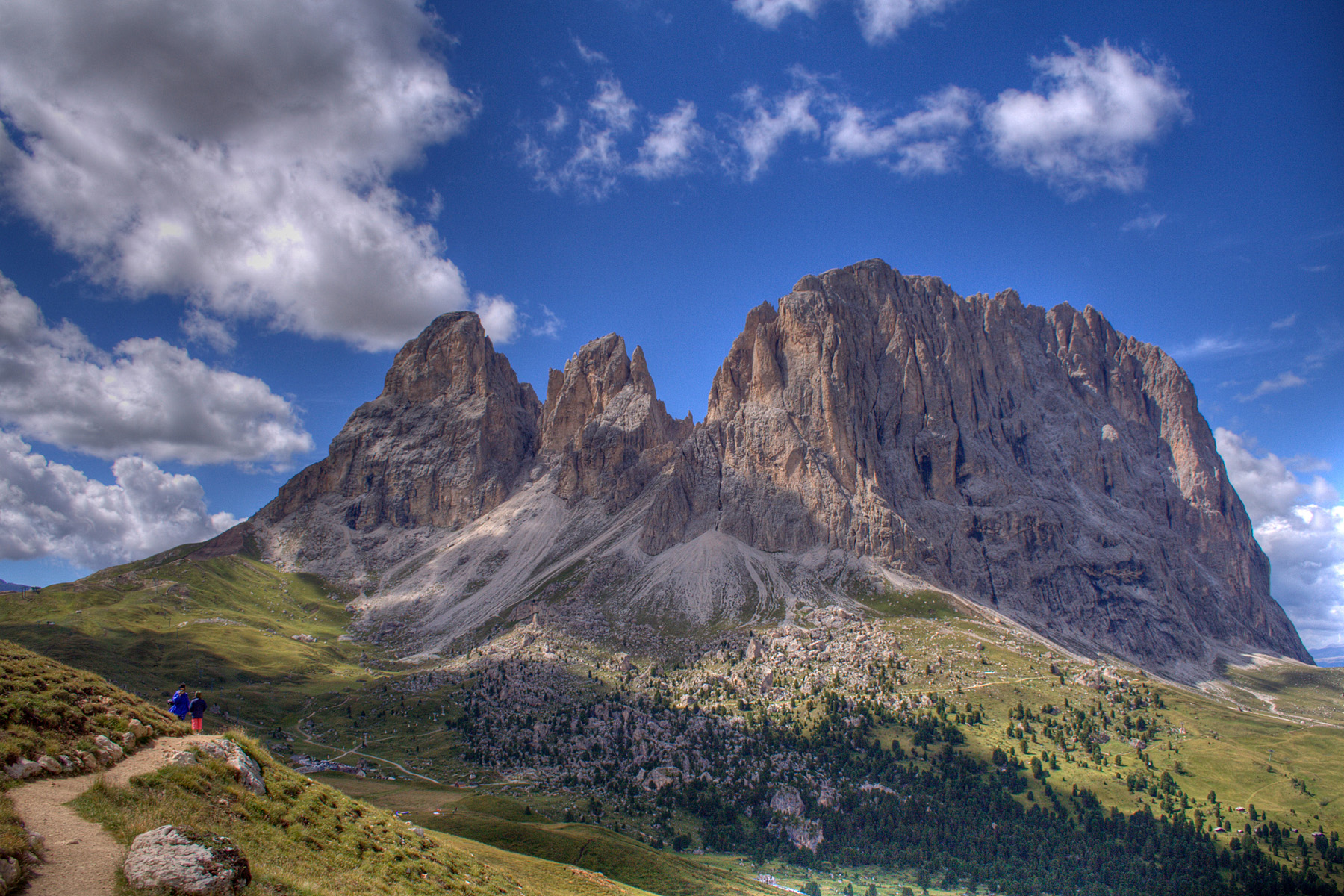
Saslonch, a mountain in the Dolomites in South Tyrol, Italy

Shot from 13 May to late October 1987, The Bear was filmed almost entirely in the Italian and Austrian areas of the Dolomites. Several additional scenes were also filmed in a Belgian Zoo in early 1988. The crew consisted of 200 individuals. Husband and wife team Tony and Heidi Lüdi served as the film's production designer and art director, respectively, alongside set decorator Bernhard Henrich. In their book, Movie Worlds: Production Design in Film, the Lüdis state that as the film's production designers, they "were constantly faced with the question 'What did you have to do?' To which we answered 'We turned the Alps into British Columbia.'" Cinematographer Philippe Rousselot noted that "the only thing Jean-Jacques was unable to control" while filming in the Bavarian Alps "was the weather: he did not manage to have the clouds take part in pre-production meetings."

Well animatronic bears were used for several of the fighting scenes, live animals—including bears, dogs, horses, and honey bees—were used on location for filming. A trained, 2.74-metre (9.0 ft) tall Kodiak bear named Bart played the adult male grizzly, while a young female bear named Douce ("Sweet" in English) took on the role of the cub, with several alternates. Three trainers worked with Bart (including his owner Doug Seus), eleven with the cubs, three with the dogs, and three with the horses. One day during production, Bart injured Annaud while the two posed for photographers; Annaud's wounds, which included claw-marks on his backside, had to be drained with a shunt for two months. In addition to the real bears, there were animatronic bears which were used in specific scenes that were made by Jim Henson's Creature Shop.

== Themes ==
With its intersecting storylines of animals and humans, The Bear includes a variety of thematic elements. These themes include orphanhood, peril and protection, and mercy toward and on the behalf of a reformed hunter.

Film critic Derek Bousé has made the connection between The Bear and Disney's model of wildlife films, comparing not only the sympathetic characters but also the filmatic structure, to the animated Bambi (1942) and the live-action Perri (1957). In his 2000 book Wildlife Films, Bousé makes a stronger correlation between Annaud's film and Disney's Dumbo (1941), in that both young animals lost their mothers at an early age, creating an unfortunate situation that allows the rest of the plot to develop (although, Dumbo's mother was merely imprisoned for a while, and was re-united with her son at the film's end). Dumbo and The Bear also share a similarly purposed dream sequence, brought on by alcohol in the former and hallucinogenic mushrooms in the latter.

The theme of the reformed hunter is a direct reference to the original novel and its author. James Oliver Curwood, himself a past hunter and trapper, considered The Grizzly King to be a "confession of one who for years hunted and killed before he learned that the wild offered a more thrilling sport than slaughter". During its American release, the film used one of Curwood's famous quotes as a tagline—"The greatest thrill is not to kill but to let live"—and the film was endorsed by both the American Humane Association and the World Wildlife Fund.

== Release ==
The Bear was released on 19 October 1988 in 318 theatres in France and two theatres in Geneva. An official tie-in to the movie The Odyssey of 'The Bear': The Making of the Film by Jean-Jacques Annaud, a translation from the French edition, followed in November. In addition, Curwood's original novel—out of print in the US for fifty years—was republished by Newmarket Press, and a children's book titled The Bear Storybook was published by St. Martin's Press.

In its first 5 days in France, it had admissions of 937,550 and was the number one film for the week in Paris, beating fellow opener Rambo III and the second week of Who Framed Roger Rabbit.

By August 1989, The Bear was reported to have grossed $90,685,310 and was yet to open in the United Kingdom, the Far East and the United States and Canada. The Bear was released on 27 October 1989 in the United States and Canada and grossed $31,753,898 taking its worldwide gross to over $120 million. It was then presented in the following countries:

- 16 December 1988 in Italy (L'orso)
- 23 December 1988 in Norway (Bjørnen) and Spain (El Oso)
- 16 February 1989 in West Germany (Der Bär)
- 24 February 1989 in Finland (Karhu) and Sweden (Björnen)
- 9 March 1989 in the Netherlands (De Beer)
- 10 March 1989 in Portugal (O Urso)
- 15 July 1989 in Japan (子熊物語)
- 18 August 1989 in Denmark (Bjørnen)
- 12 October 1989 in Australia
- 22 September 1989 in the United Kingdom
- December 1989 in Turkey (Ayi)
- 18 January 1990 in Argentina (El Oso)
- 1 February 1990 in Brazil (O Urso)
- 28 July 1990 in Korea (베어)
- 30 May 1992 in Russia (Медведь)

== Critical reception ==
The film was a critical success. It holds an 88% "Fresh" rating on the review aggregate website Rotten Tomatoes, based on 16 reviews with an average rating of 7.7/10. On Metacritic, the film holds a weighted average score of 60 out of 100 based on 12 reviews, indicating "mixed or average reviews". Audiences polled by CinemaScore gave the film an average grade of "A-" on an A+ to F scale.

Some critics pointed to The Bear's adult handling of the wildlife film genre, which is often dismissed as belonging solely to children's films. While positively reviewing the film, critic Roger Ebert wrote that The Bear "is not a cute fantasy in which bears ride tricycles and play house. It is about life in the wild, and it does an impressive job of seeming to show wild bears in their natural habitat" and that scenes from the film, especially those "of horseplay and genuine struggles – gradually build up our sense of the personalities of these animals".

Janet Maslin of The New York Times, however, believing that the film was less about its wild characters and more about personification, wrote: "The Bear...is a remarkable achievement only on its own terms, which happen to be extremely limited and peculiar...its true emphasis is not on wildlife. Instead, it grafts the thoughts and dreams of more commonplace beings onto bear-shaped stand-ins." Writing for the hunting and fishing magazine Field & Stream, editor Cathleen Erring stated that The Bear not only stripped its human characters of "all sympathetic traits and [gave] them to the bears", but it also created "a caricature that will subject anyone embarking on a bear hunt ... to the kind of scorn previously reserved for 'Bambi Butchers'."

Some reviewers were critical of the film's dream sequences, which heavily utilize special effects and deviate from the overall naturalistic feel of the film. In his review for the St. Petersburg Times, Hal Lipper called the dream sequences "existential flights of fancy are accompanied by psychedelic images that seem better suited for '60s 'happenings.'" In addition, one scene in which the male grizzly mates with a female bear while the cub looks on was criticized as being unfriendly for children viewers. David Denby of New York Magazine stated as much in his review of the film, noting "I would like to be able to recommend The Bear as a movie that parents and children could see together, but I'm afraid there's a scene in the middle that would have to be... explained."

A small campaign was launched for the 62nd Academy Awards to secure Bart a nomination for the Academy Award for Best Actor, with proponents arguing the bear gave such a moving performance he should be the first animal actor to receive consideration for an award. However, the campaign was dismissed by the Academy, who stated they would not permit non-human actors to be nominated for awards, in the Best Actor category or any other.

== Awards and nominations ==
Won:

- 1988: National Academy of Cinema, France, Academy Award (Jean-Jacques Annaud)
- 1989: César, Best Director (Jean-Jacques Annaud)
- 1990: Genesis Award, Feature Film (Foreign)
- 1990: Guild of German Art House Cinemas Film Award, Silver Foreign Film (Ausländischer Film) (Jean-Jacques Annaud)

Nominated:

- 1990: Academy Award, Best Film Editing (Noëlle Boisson)
- 1990: American Society of Cinematographers Award, Outstanding Achievement in Cinematography in Theatrical Releases (Philippe Rousselot)
- 1990: BAFTA Film Award, Best Cinematography (Philippe Rousselot)
- 1990: Young Artist Award, Best Family Motion Picture - Adventure or Cartoon
- César - Best Cinematography (Philippe Rousselot)
- César - Best Film (Jean-Jacques Annaud)
- César - Best Poster (Claude Millet, Christian Blondel, Denise Millet)
- César - Best Sound (Bernard Leroux, Claude Villand, Laurent Quaglio)
