= Bart the Bear =

Kodiak bear that appeared in several Hollywood films

- Bart the Bear with trainer Doug Seus, 1997
- Species: Kodiak bear
- Sex: Male
- Born: January 19, 1977; Baltimore, Maryland, U.S.
- Died: May 10, 2000 (aged 23); Heber City, Utah, U.S.
- Resting place: Seus ranch, Heber City, Utah, U.S.
- Occupation: Animal actor
- Years active: 1980–2000
- Owners: Doug and Lynne Seus
- Weight: 1500 lb (680 kg)
- Height: 9 ft (2.7 m)
- BartTheBear.com

Bart the Bear (January 19, 1977 – May 10, 2000) was a male Kodiak bear best known for his numerous appearances in films, including The Bear (for which he received widespread acclaim), White Fang, Legends of the Fall, and The Edge. He was trained by animal trainers Doug (b. October 8, 1942, in Erie, Pennsylvania) and Lynne Seus (née Lynda Beers on March 27, 1944, in Lincoln, Nebraska) of Wasatch Rocky Mountain Wildlife, Inc., in Heber City, Utah.

== Early life ==
Bart was born on January 19, 1977, at the Baltimore Zoo. After reaching adulthood, he made his film debut in the film Windwalker (1981). He grew to 9′ 7.5″ (2.90 m) tall and weighed 1,500 pounds (680 kg) throughout his life as an adult.

== Career ==
Anthony Hopkins worked with Bart in two movies: Legends of the Fall and The Edge. According to Lynne (Doug's wife), "Tony Hopkins was absolutely brilliant with Bart... He acknowledged and respected him like a fellow actor. He would spend hours just looking at Bart and admiring him. He did so many of his own scenes with Bart". Film critic Kenneth Turan called Bart's performance in The Edge "the capstone of an illustrious career" and "a milestone in ursine acting".

Bart's greatest recognition came when he starred in the title role of Jean-Jacques Annaud's 1988 French film, The Bear, playing an adult grizzly who befriends an orphaned cub and defeats hunters. Annaud auditioned fifty bear actors from all over the world before selecting Bart. In order to perform the role, Bart, trained by Seus, successfully learned several new routines and behaviors, including going against his natural abhorrence of a strange bear to accept the unrelated cub co-starring with him. Annaud remained impressed with Bart's performance even after being injured by Bart when the director, against trainers' orders, entered Bart's enclosure to pose for publicity photos. The Bear was a hit in both Europe and the United States, grossing over $31 million in the United States and over $100 million worldwide, and reportedly resulting in a campaign for an Oscar nomination despite animal actors being precluded from receiving Academy Awards.

In 1998, Bart made an appearance at the 70th Academy Awards as part of a salute to animal actors. He presented an envelope to Mike Myers onstage.

== Charity work ==
Bart was a "spokesbear" for the Vital Ground Foundation, a nonprofit conservation organization that works to preserve threatened wildlife habitat along the Rocky Mountains and on Kodiak Island, among other places in North America.

After receiving a cancer diagnosis, Bart also served as the "spokesbear" for the Animal Cancer Center at Colorado State University.

== Death ==
In October 1998, Bart was diagnosed with cancer and later underwent surgery twice to remove tumors from his right paw. The cancer returned, however, taking away his strength and appetite and causing him to not want to take pain medication. He was euthanized on May 10, 2000, at the age of 23. He was buried on the Seuses' ranch.

At the time of his death, he was filming the television documentary Growing Up Grizzly (2001) (also featuring Bart's namesake, Bart the Bear 2), which was narrated by Brad Pitt, who had also appeared in Legends of the Fall.

== Legacy ==
Bart the Bear 2, an unrelated Alaskan brown bear cub (2000–2021), was adopted by Doug and Lynne Seus shortly before Bart's death. He followed in the footsteps of the original Bart and became an established animal actor and Vital Ground ambassador.

== Selected filmography ==
=== Film ===
- Windwalker (1981)
- The Clan of the Cave Bear (uncredited, 1986) – the Cave Bear
- Berserker (uncredited, 1987)
- The Great Outdoors (1988) – the Bald-Headed Bear (Jody)
- The Bear (1988) – the Kodiak Bear
- White Fang (1991)
- The Giant of Thunder Mountain (1991)
- Homeward Bound: The Incredible Journey (1993)
- On Deadly Ground (1994)
- Legends of the Fall (1994)
- 12 Monkeys (1995)
- Homeward Bound II: Lost in San Francisco (1996)
- Walking Thunder (1997) – Walking Thunder
- The Edge (1997)
- Meet the Deedles (1998) – circus bear

=== Television ===
- The Life and Times of Grizzly Adams, multiple episodes (1977–78) – Ben as a cub
- The Gambler: The Adventure Continues (TV film) (1983)
- Louis L'Amour's Down the Long Hills (TV film) (1986)
- Lost in the Barrens (TV film) (1990)
- The Young Riders, season 1, episode 17, "Decoy" (1990) – Bart
- Les amants de rivière rouge (miniseries) (1996)
- 70th Academy Awards – presenter (1998)

== See also ==
- List of individual bears
- List of animal actors
