= Vital Ground =

American nonprofit environmental organization

Vital Ground Foundation
- Founded: 1990
- Founder: Doug Seus, Lynne Seus
- Purpose: Connecting Landscapes -- Protecting Wildlife
- Location: Missoula, Montana
- Region served: North America
- Product: Wildlife habitat conservation in the Northern Rockies
- Method: Land trust, Conservation Easements, Fee-Title Acquisitions
- Members: 4,000
- Key people: Kelly Johnson (chairperson), Walter Becky (vice chair), Tim Polich (treasurer), David Wesley (secretary), Ryan Lutey (executive director), Douglas H. Chadwick, (chair of lands committee)
- Employees: 8
- Website: www.vitalground.org

Operating as a nonprofit environmental land trust, The Vital Ground Foundation protects and restores North America's grizzly bear populations by conserving wildlife habitat. Founded in 1990, Vital Ground operates in the belief that the grizzly bear, an umbrella species, is nature's barometer of a healthy and complete ecosystem, and that conserving grizzly bears and their habitat is key to ensuring diverse and healthy landscapes.

== Approach ==
Vital Ground protects critical grizzly bear habitat through cooperative conservation partnerships. The organization focuses on strategically located lands where conservation values transcend property boundaries. Vital Ground partners with willing landowners to protect vital habitat through conservation easements and land purchases and also participates in select projects on public lands that are designed to reduce conflicts between bears and people, improve habitat quality, protect or enhance resident populations, or increase the land's carrying capacity for grizzly bears. The organization's strategy is governed by empirical data on grizzly bear biology and habitat requirements.

== Conservation work ==
Based on monitoring data provided by the International Grizzly Bear Committee as well as other sources, Vital Ground seeks out private lands conservation imperative to the recovery of the threatened grizzly bear and critical to maintaining and enhancing the public values of surrounding public lands.

Vital Ground's conservation easements and land acquisitions permanently safeguard the core wildlife habitat characteristics unique to each project property while maintaining and enhancing essential habitat and wildlife corridors on a landscape scale. Since its founding in 1990, Vital Ground has helped to protect and enhance well over one-half million acres of crucial grizzly habitat in Montana, Idaho, Wyoming, Alaska, and British Columbia.

== History ==
Vital Ground evolved from a unique relationship between humans and a bear. Heber City, Utah's Doug and Lynne Seus adopted and trained a zoo-born Kodiak grizzly they named Bart to appear in feature films, which include The Great Outdoors, Legends of the Fall, White Fang, The Bear and The Edge. As Doug and Lynne worked with Bart, it became clear that he taught them far more than they could ever teach him.

The Seuses acquired Bart in 1977, and he lived with them until his death in 2000. He appeared in several films and attended the Academy Awards.

Bart's intelligence and loyalty demonstrated to Doug and Lynne that brown bears, also known as grizzlies, could help teach children respect for all living things. The Seuses felt that, as a member of a species truly symbolic of the wilderness, Bart could deliver a powerful message in support of land conservation. They hoped that Bart could offer humankind a chance to learn from past mistakes and, in so doing, secure remaining private wildlands rather than exploiting them.

Inspired by Bart, the Seus' launched Vital Ground through the purchase of 240 acres of prime grizzly bear habitat adjoining protected land in Pine Butte Preserve, along Montana's eastern front of the Rocky Mountains.

Bart took on a new role as ambassador for Vital Ground, and until his death in 2000, his public appearances with Doug and Lynne sought to convey the predicament of rapidly diminishing natural areas—along with their resident wildlife—while promoting a message of hope that we might become better stewards of these great lands.

As Vital Ground has evolved and expanded its role in conservation, the Seus' continue to donate use of their animals (including Bart II, a brown bear named for the original Bart) as ambassadors to help spread the message about protecting our wild heritage. The presence of these highly intelligent and sensitive grizzlies, combined with the teachings by Doug and Lynne, have made a difference in motivating individuals to support the organization's work.

In 2004, the organization formally adopted the Standards and Practices of the Land Trust Alliance (LTA) to guide all of its conservation activities. As a member of LTA, Vital Ground is committed to ensuring that every land acquisition and easement transaction is legally, ethically and technically sound.

== Featured projects ==
- Vital Ground partnered with several organizations and agencies to help support the Deer Creek Conservation Project 6, which is six miles northwest of Seeley Lake, Montana, and at the southern boundary of the Northern Continental Divide Grizzly Bear Recovery Zone.
- Vital Ground shepherded an effort to permanently protect 720 acres with conservation easements in the Selkirk Mountains of north Idaho.
- Vital Ground made its first acquisition for the Cabinet-Purcell-Selkirk Wildlife Linkage Initiative — Northwestern Montana's Yaak Mountain purchase ensures the property will never be commercially or residentially developed and will connect unfragmented grizzly habitat.
- Vital Ground completed the purchase of its fourth property at Bismark Meadows in northern Idaho. The 327-acre acquisition, the second-largest property Vital Ground has purchased to date, is situated between three parcels previously acquired and consolidates the properties into a contiguous holding of over 491 acres.
- Vital Ground accepted donations from the second- and third-generation owners of two properties on Windfall Creek in northwest Montana's Swan Valley. The properties sit adjacent to Flathead National Forest lands and to other private lands that were protected earlier by conservation easements.
- In July 2014, Vital Ground received a $400,000 grant from the U.S. Forest Service to protect 142 acres of forested land in the northwest corner of Montana near Troy.

== The Right Place Campaign ==
The Right Place Campaign helps facilitate the recovery of the grizzly bear populations in the Cabinet-Purcell-Selkirk mountain region of northwest Montana, north Idaho, and the trans-border area of southern British Columbia.

The campaign objective is to identify and protect wildlife linkage zones that will allow grizzlies to naturally move south into the Bitterroot Ecosystem—a 3.7 million-acre wildlife paradise made up of two wilderness areas in Central Idaho. The initiative contains two fundraising efforts to address habitat conservation in this region:

1. The Cabinet-Purcell Wildlife Linkage Initiative is an active fundraising initiative under The Right Place Campaign to protect grizzly bear and wildlife habitat in the trans-border area of northwestern Montana and southern British Columbia.
1. The Selkirk Initiative was launched in 2001 to address habitat protection for this vulnerable population. The heart of the Selkirk Mountains provides a safe haven for grizzlies, yet the population's survival depends on two critical steps: a) protecting access to food-rich lowland habitats the bears need during spring and fall, and b) conserving dwindling linkage zones to reestablish connections and genetic flow with neighboring grizzly populations.

== Publications ==
Vital Ground publishes magazines, biennials reports and e-newsletters:

- Vital News
- Biennial reports covering properties and easements acquired
- Vital e-News
