= L.A. Confidential (disambiguation) =

L.A. Confidential is a neo-noir novel by American writer James Ellroy.

L.A. Confidential may also refer to:

- L.A. Confidential (film), 1997 American neo-noir crime thriller film based on the Ellroy novel
  - L.A. Confidential (soundtrack), soundtrack of the film
- L.A. Confidential presents: Knoc-turn'al, debut extended play by American rapper Knoc-turn'al
- "LA Confidential" (song), a song by Canadian singer Tory Lanez
- L.A. Confidentiel, book by sports journalist Pierre Ballester and The Sunday Times sports correspondent David Walsh
- The Real L.A. Confidential, 2008 book by journalist Peter Noyes
