= Red Machine =

Red Machine or The Red Machine may refer to:

- Soviet Union men's national ice hockey team, nicknamed the Red Machine
- Into the Grizzly Maze (originally titled Red Machine), an American action horror-thriller film
- One of the two computers deploying the Compatible Time-Sharing System, nicknamed the "red machine".
- "Red Machine", a team in the 2021 Channel One Trophy figure skating competition.

== See also ==
- Big Red Machine, a nickname of 1970s Cincinnati Reds
