= The Grizzly King =

1916 novel by James Oliver Curwood

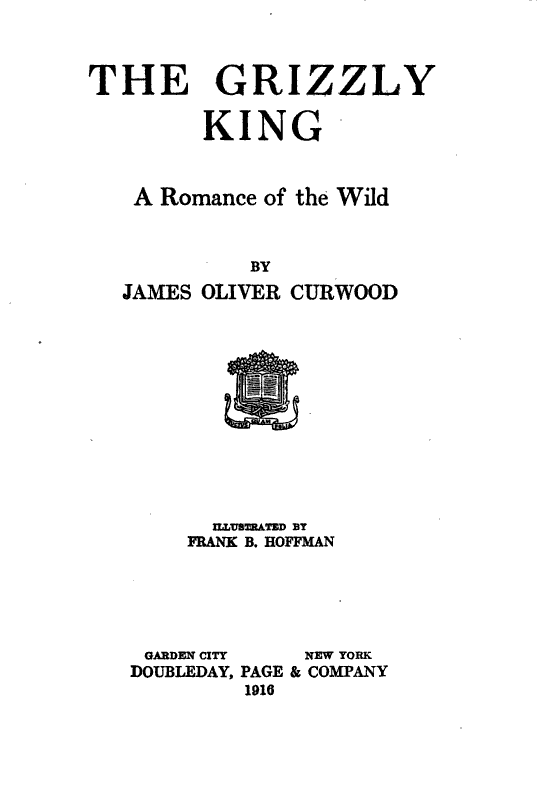
- Title page for The Grizzly King (1916)
- Author: James Oliver Curwood
- Illustrator: Frank B. Hoffman
- Publisher: Doubleday, Page & Company
- Publication date: 1916
- Pages: 234
- OCLC: 948544710

The Grizzly King: A Romance of the Wild is a 1916 novel by American author James Oliver Curwood. It was the inspiration for the director Jean-Jacques Annaud's 1988 film L'Ours, known in North America as The Bear.
