= Bart the Bear 2 =

Kodiak bear actor (2000–2021)

- Other name: Little Bart
- Species: Brown bear
- Sex: Male
- Born: January 20, 2000 near Paxson, Alaska, U.S.
- Died: November 14, 2021 (aged 21); Heber City, Utah, U.S.
- Occupation: Bear actor
- Years active: 2000–2021
- Owners: Doug and Lynne Seus
- Weight: 1300 lb (590 kg)
- Height: 8 ft (2.4 m)
- Named after: Bart the Bear
- Official website

Bart the Bear 2, also called Bart the Bear II, Bart 2, Bart II, or Little Bart (January 20, 2000 – November 14, 2021) was a male interior Alaskan grizzly bear who appeared in several films and television series, including Without a Paddle, An Unfinished Life, Into the Wild, Evan Almighty, We Bought a Zoo, Game of Thrones, and most recently Pete's Dragon. His trainers were Doug Seus and Lynne Seus of Wasatch Rocky Mountain Wildlife, Inc., in Heber City, Utah. Bart 2 was named after the earlier Seus-trained Bart the Bear, although the two bears are not related.

== Early life ==
Bart 2 and his sister, Honey Bump, were born in January 2000. Within a few months, they were orphaned when their mother was shot and killed outside Paxson, Alaska within the Wrangell Mountains. They were found by an Alaskan State Trooper, Gregory Fisher. Unable to survive on their own, they lived in the Fisher household with Greg’s wife, Mallie, and their two children, Hunter and Wyatt, before being officially adopted by Doug and Lynne Seus on April 26, 2000. Bart 2 was named after the Seus' well-known bear Bart the Bear, who died two weeks later in May, shortly after the Seuses adopted the cubs. Doug Seus decided to name the new male cub after the original Bart after seeing that he "had the same nature as the original Bart, and a lot of the attributes." That same year, Bart 2 made his film debut along with Honey Bump in Dr. Dolittle 2, appearing as the offspring of the bear character "Archie" (who was portrayed by another Seus-trained bear, Tank).

The childhood and young adulthood of Bart 2 and Honey Bump were the focus of two episodes of the Animal Planet channel Growing Up... series. Growing Up Grizzly (2001), hosted by Brad Pitt, focused on the cubs' first year. A second episode, Growing Up Grizzly 2 (2004), hosted by Jennifer Aniston, updated viewers on Bart and Honey Bump's life.

As a cub and young adult bear, Bart 2 was often called "Little Bart". However, since growing to his adult size of 8 feet 6 inches (2.59 m) tall and 1,100 pounds (500 kg), he has been more frequently called "Bart" or "Bart the Bear", with or without the addition of "2" or "II".

== Career ==
Like his predecessor Bart the Bear, Bart 2 appeared in many Hollywood films and television series, and has also served as an ambassador for the Vital Ground Foundation, which procures threatened wildlife habitat. He has appeared on screen with Kevin James, Emile Hirsch, and Matt Damon. In 2013, he appeared on the HBO TV series Game of Thrones, in which he was pitted against Jaime Lannister and Brienne of Tarth. Bart 2's final appearances were in the 2015 action horror-thriller Into the Grizzly Maze, and the 2016 remake of Disney's Pete's Dragon.

== Death ==
On November 14, 2021, Bart died at home in Heber City, Utah, due to declining health. He was 21 years old.

== Filmography ==
=== Films ===
- Dr. Dolittle 2 (2001) (with Honey Bump and Tank)
- Without a Paddle (2004)
- An Unfinished Life (2005)
- Evan Almighty (2007) (with Honey Bump)
- Into the Wild (2007)
- Friends for Life (2008) (direct-to-DVD)
- Did You Hear About the Morgans? (2009)
- Horse Crazy 2: The Legend of Grizzly Mountain (2010)
- Zookeeper (2011) (with Honey Bump)
- We Bought a Zoo (2011) (with Tank)
- Into the Grizzly Maze (2015)
- Pete's Dragon (2016)

=== Television ===
- Growing Up Grizzly (2001, Animal Planet) (with Honey Bump)
- Growing Up Grizzly 2 (2004, Animal Planet) (with Honey Bump)
- Into the West (TV miniseries) (2005, TNT) (produced by DreamWorks)
- CSI: Crime Scene Investigation... Season 5, Episode 14, "Unbearable" (2005)
- Scrubs ... Season 5, Episode 5, "My New God" (2006)
- Game of Thrones ... Season 3, Episode 7, "The Bear and the Maiden Fair" (2013)

== See also ==
- List of individual bears
