= A Beast the Color of Winter =

1983 non-fiction book by Douglas H. Chadwick

- Book cover, first edition
- Author: Douglas H. Chadwick
- Language: English
- Publisher: Sierra Club Books
- Publication date: 1 January 1983
- ISBN: 0871568055

A Beast the Color of Winter: The Mountain Goat Observed is a 1983 non-fiction book by American biologist and author Douglas H. Chadwick, published by Sierra Club Books. Chadwick describes his interactions with Rocky mountain goats and pleads for their preservation. The book received generally positive reviews for its accessible writing and interesting descriptions.

== Contents ==
A Beast the Color of Winter discusses the lives and habits of mountain goats. The book describes their animalistic nature, avoiding prescribing them human traits. Chadwick also describes his own interactions with goats, including being gored by one after being perceived as a rival, following which he studied goat behavior and behaved appropriately, leading to no further conflict with the goat. The book ends by promoting preservation, noting that goat populations have been declining at alarming rates.

== Critical reception ==
The book was described by Chris Volk for the Missoulian as "a fascinating and passionate, yet informative and scientific, tribute to one of Montana's most stalwart residents and mascots", and strongly recommended. The book also received a positive reception in The Spokesman-Review, with reviewer Rich Landers noting that the prose was "more readable than you'd expect from a scientist", and noting that while the book promotes a position on preservation that may be controversial among hunters, it presents it in a strong way worthy of consideration.

The book was praised by John Wilkes, writing for the San Francisco Examiner, for its vivid descriptions and amusing anecdotes about goat behavior.
