= L.A. Confidential (soundtrack) =

L.A. Confidential: Original Motion Picture Score

Soundtrack album by Jerry Goldsmith
- Released: November 25, 1997
- Genre: Film score
- Length: 30:01
- Label: Varèse Sarabande
- Producer: Jerry Goldsmith

Jerry Goldsmith chronology
Air Force One (1997)	L.A. Confidential: Original Motion Picture Score (1997)	The Edge (1997)

L.A. Confidential

Soundtrack album by Jerry Goldsmith/various
- Released: 26 August 1997
- Genre: Soundtrack
- Length: 35:43
- Label: Restless Records 74321525962
- Producer: Curtis Hanson

L.A. Confidential is either the original soundtrack, on the Restless Records label featuring mainly songs and source music, or the original film score, on Varèse Sarabande Records, of the 1997 Academy Award- and Golden Globe Award-winning film L.A. Confidential starring Kevin Spacey, Russell Crowe, Guy Pearce, James Cromwell, Danny DeVito, and Kim Basinger (who won the Academy Award for Best Supporting Actress for this film). The original score was composed and conducted by Jerry Goldsmith, and performed by the Hollywood Studio Symphony.

== Track listing (Score on Varèse Sarabande) ==
Professional ratings
Review scores
Source	Rating
AllMusic	4/5 stars
Filmtracks	3/5 stars

Jerry Goldsmith's score was nominated for the Academy Award for Best Original Dramatic Score, the Golden Globe Award for Best Original Score (lost both times to the score of Titanic), and the BAFTA Award for Best Film Music (lost to the music of Romeo + Juliet). It is based on a musical motif from Leonard Bernstein's Academy Award-nominated score for On the Waterfront.

1. Bloody Christmas (2:50)
2. The Cafe (2:20)
3. Questions (2:20)
4. Susan Lefferts (2:54)
5. Out Of The Rain (2:47)
6. Rollo Tomasi (3:08)
7. The Photos (2:28)
8. The Keys (1:52)
9. Shootout (4:09)
10. Good Lad (2:19)
11. The Victor (2:32)

Notes and Quotes: The insert contains a note from the director about the score, as well as biographical information about Goldsmith. A song album for the film was released three months earlier and includes only two tracks of Goldsmith music (only "The Victor" appears on the original score release under the name "L.A. Confidential").

== Track listing (Soundtrack on Restless) ==
Professional ratings
Review scores
Source	Rating
AllMusic	3/5 stars

1. "Badge of Honor" (0:22) - Jerry Goldsmith (score)
2. "Ac-Cent-Tchu-Ate the Positive" (1:56) - Harold Arlen, Johnny Mercer
3. "The Christmas Blues" (2:53) - Sammy Cahn, David Jack Holt
4. "Look for the Silver Lining" (2:39) - Buddy DeSylva, Jerome Kern
5. "Makin' Whoopee" (3:28) - Walter Donaldson, Gus Kahn
6. "Hit the Road to Dreamland" (1:58) - Harold Arlen, Johnny Mercer
7. "Oh! Look at Me Now" (3:08) - Joe Bushkin, John DeVries
8. "The Lady Is a Tramp" (3:12) - Lorenz Hart, Richard Rodgers
9. "Wheel of Fortune" (3:24) - Bennie Benjamin, George David Weiss
10. "But Not for Me" (2:50) - George Gershwin, Ira Gershwin
11. "How Important Can It Be?" (2:33) - Bennie Benjamin, George David Weiss
12. "Looking At You" (2:17) - Cole Porter
13. "Powder Your Face with Sunshine" (2:32) - Carmen Lombardo, Stanley Rochinski
14. "L.A. Confidential" (2:31) - Jerry Goldsmith (score)

Unlike "Badge of Honor," L.A. Confidential also appears on the score album (as "The Victor").
