= Limburg Zoo =

Coordinates: 51.0130°N 5.4941°E

- Interactive map of Limburg Zoo
- Date opened: 17 May 1970
- Date closed: 16 April 1998
- Location: Zwartberg, Belgium

The Limburg Zoo, also known as Zwartberg Zoo, was a zoo in the Belgian parish of Zwartberg in the municipality of Genk. The zoo was private property of the Wauters family and did not receive any subsidy or sponsorship. The zoo was known for its large number of animals, which resulted from the internal breeding programme and the acquisition of abused and dumped animals from bankrupt zoos and circuses. The large number of animals, the poor state of the animal enclosures, and actions by animal rights organisations drew media attention to the zoo. In 1997 the Wauters family decided to close it; the animals were relocated to other zoos.

== History ==
In the late 1960s Marcel Wauters, then a director of the "Leen- en Kredietkas" (a financial institution), bought 6 hectares (15 acres) of land that had formerly belonged to the Zwartberg coal mine. The zoo opened on Whit Monday 17 May 1970 with more than 200 animals. In 1973 there were already more than 1000 animals, so another 10 hectares (25 acres) of land were bought. Another 4 hectares (10 acres) were bought some years later.

The zoo had some major accidents:

- In October 1976 an employee was torn apart by bears.
- In March 1980, 15 predators were suffocated by a faulty oil stove. Many other animals were affected, but could be saved.
- In 1989 the mouflons escaped from the park after a car slid off a road and breached the zoo's fence.
- In 1992 monkeys crushed the arm of a young visitor. A few weeks later, other monkeys bit off three of a young boy´s fingers. In 1995 Marcel Wauters was taken to court for "unintentional harm" and "lack of precaution" because of these accidents. He received a fine and one-year suspended imprisonment.

As the zoo failed to make a profit, the Wauters family started a media campaign in 1985. That year the park had 50 000 extra visitors.

The zoo had troubles with the government and animal rights organisations:

- In 1985 a bird association informed the gendarmes that the zoo was housing some bird species illegally. After an investigation, many birds were confiscated because the zoo did not have appropriate licences.
- Under legal regulations, the zoo was only allowed to obtain meat from two small slaughterhouses. As the slaughterhouses were unable to provide enough meat, the zoo installed its own freezer. In 1986, 20 tons of meat were confiscated as the zoo had no licence for the freezer and in any case the equipment was only certified to store meat for human consumption. After the Wauters family killed some of their zebu to feed the predators, the Belgian Ministry of Agriculture decided that the zoo could buy meat from other slaughterhouses.
- In 1991 a section of Limburg Zoo was expropriated as part of the creation of a business park. The meat storage area was now separated from the rest of the zoo by a public road, and the zoo had to pay road tax on many of their vehicles since they had to use the public road to travel between the meat storage area and the rest of the zoo.
- In 1992 the European Commission proposed new rules setting minimum standards for the housing of specific species. The Wauters family did not believe they would be able to afford to make the necessary changes to the animal enclosures.
- In 1994 the BBC featured in the Limburg Zoo in a documentary programme called State of the Ark, in which they called it the worst zoo in the world. Scenes from the documentary were shown on television worldwide, including by the Belgian channel vtm. The coverage led to a sharp drop in the number of visitors. Many animal rights groups, such as the Belgian group Global Action in the Interest of Animals (GAIA), complained. The Belgian Animal Inspectorate investigated, but concluded that the accusations were exaggerated. According to them, the Limburg Zoo was not really a zoo, but a shelter for animals rejected by other parks.
- In 1995 Limburg Zoo negotiated with Dutch investors on building a safari park. The plans were cancelled after the government revoked the zoo's operating licence in response to pressure from animal rights groups. The Wauters family started a lawsuit and won as they had a licence valid until 2000 and had not broken any law. As the European guidelines were still not operational, the then Flemish Environment Minister, Theo Kelchtermans, introduced his own regulations. As the Limburg Zoo could not afford to meet the new standards, Kelchtermans restarted a procedure to close the zoo by 15 November 1996, in which he again failed.
- In 1997 members of GAIA staged a protest at the entrance to the zoo, trying to prevent visitors from entering; the police intervened. On 16 April 1997 the Wauters family decided to close the park. The majority of the animals were sold to Veeweyde in the Netherlands and a nearby zoo in Coutisse.

The city of Genk bought the park in 1999. Demolition of what remained of the zoo began in January 2002.
