= Douglas H. Chadwick =

American wildlife biologist, and photographer

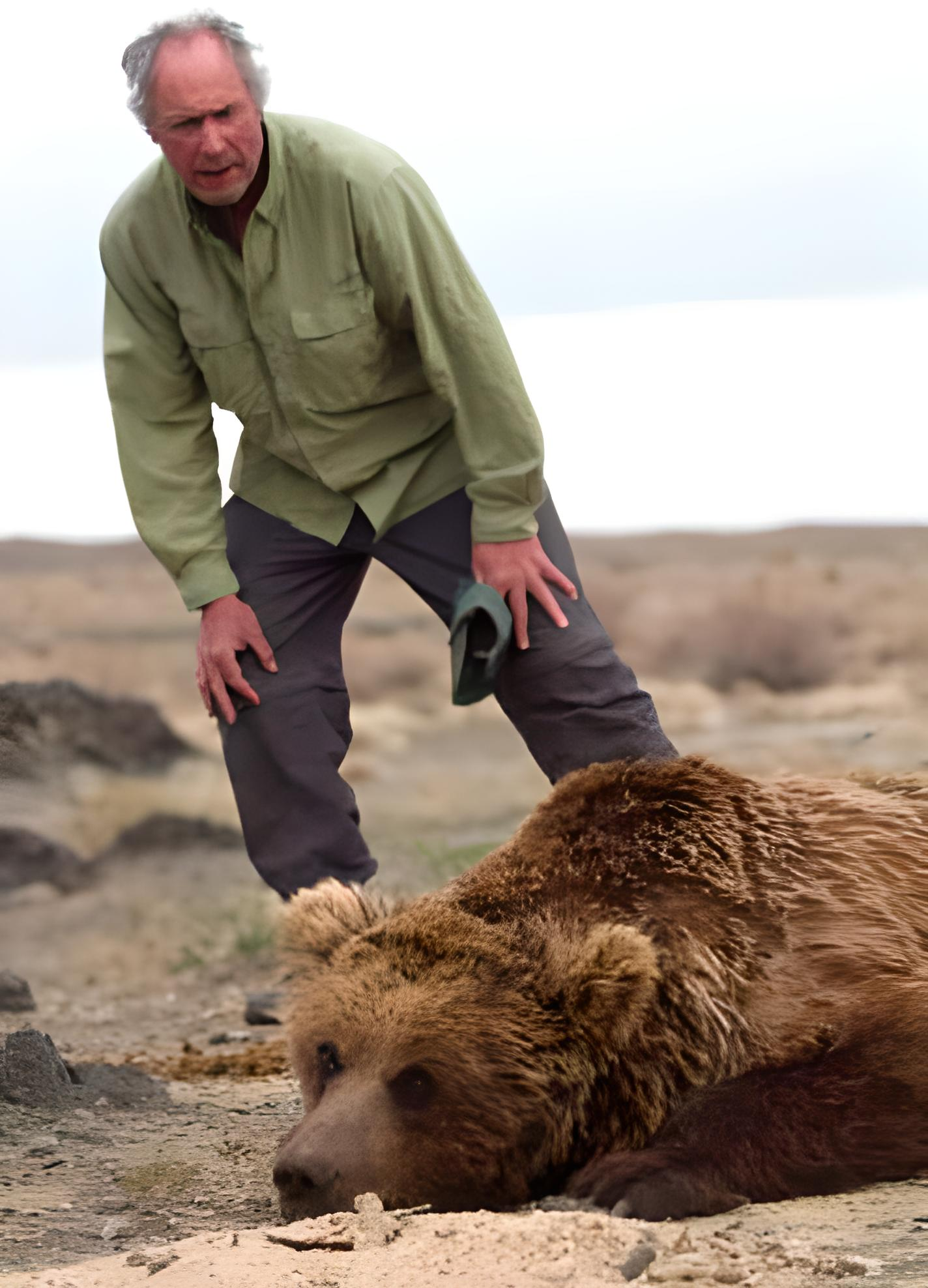
Chadwick and a Gobi bear.

Douglas H. Chadwick (born February 24, 1948) is an American wildlife biologist, author, photographer and frequent National Geographic contributor. He is the author of fourteen books and more than 200 articles on wildlife and wild places.

Chadwick's affiliation with National Geographic spans more than thirty-five years and more than fifty articles from the first in 1977 up to an assignment in 2019 for an article on wolverines. Other publications which have featured his work include: Defenders of Wildlife, Audubon, The Huffington Post, Backpacker, TV Guide, The Smithsonian Magazine, Sports Illustrated, Reader's Digest, and Outside. He has appeared in two PBS documentaries: Night of the Grizzlies (2010) and Wolverine: Chasing the Phantom (2010).

Chadwick is a past officer and current member of the board of The Vital Ground Foundation, and chairman of that organization's Lands Committee, responsible for choosing acquisition properties as part of Vital Ground's One Landscape wildlife corridor system. He is also a director of the Gobi Bear Fund, part of the Gobi Bear Initiative, which attempts to restore the world's least known and most endangered population of grizzly bears. Since 2013 he has served on the advisory board of the Liz Claiborne Art Ortenberg Foundation, a New York-based non-profit that supports wildlife research and collaborative, community-based conservation projects around the world.

Chadwick graduated from the University of Washington, Seattle, with a B.S. in Zoology. He then earned an M.S. in Wildlife Biology from the University of Montana, Missoula. After graduating, he worked as a research wildlife biologist studying mountain goats and grizzly bears in northwestern Montana.

== Single species studies ==
Chadwick's research involves multi-year projects of extended close observation in species habitats, radio collar tracking, mapping, and studies of community relationships. In this manner, he has studied wolverines in the northwestern U.S. and Canada, mountain goats and grizzlies in the Rockies, and elephants in Africa.

== Wildlife corridors ==
In his work for Vital Ground, Chadwick evaluates potential corridor lands to link the six recognized grizzly bear recovery ecosystems in the lower 48 states. He has guided land and easement acquisitions in, for example, the Cabinet-Purcell Wildlife Linkage Initiative Area in western Montana, and the Selkirk Initiative which includes the Bismark Meadows area.

== Glacier Wolverine Project ==
In 2006, Chadwick began what would become a five-year participation in the Glacier Wolverine Project, to follow a small set of wolverines as they traveled over their extensive habitat centered on and around Glacier National Park (U.S.). This study was the subject of Chadwick's book, The Wolverine Way, and the PBS/Nature documentary Wolverine: Chasing the Phantom. Chadwick played a major on-screen role in the Nature documentary. The Glacier Wolverine Project was conducted by the U.S. Forest Service, Rocky Mountain Research Station, Missoula, Montana, under the leadership of principal investigator, Jeffrey Copeland.

== Published works ==
=== Scientific publications ===
- 1974. Mountain Goat Ecology-Logging Relationships in the Bunker Creek Drainage of Western Montana. M.S. Thesis, University of Montana, 262pp.
- 1977. The influence of Mountain Goat Social Relationships on Population Size and Distribution. Proceedings of First International Symposium on Mountain Goats, William Samuel and W.G. McGregor, editors. British Columbia Ministry of Recreation and Conservation, Fish and Wildlife Branch.
- 1979. Ecological Relationships of Mountain Goats (Oreamnos americanus) in Glacier National Park, Montana. Proceedings of First Conference on Scientific Research in the National Parks. U.S. Dept. Interior, NPS Transactions and Proceedings Series No. 5, Vol I, pp 451–456.
- 1992. A Concentration of Harlequin Ducks in the Strait of Georgia, British Columbia. Proceedings of the First Harlequin Duck Symposium. Canadian Wildlife Service, Delta, British Columbia.

=== Books and chapters ===
Patagonia Books:

- 2021. Four Fifths a Grizzly: A New Perspective on Nature that Just Might Save Us All.
- 2016. Tracking Gobi Grizzlies: Surviving Beyond the Back of Beyond with Photographer Joe Riis.
- 2013. The Wolverine Way. 275 pages of wolverine ecology, adventure, and discovery based on participation in the Glacier Wolverine Project.

Sierra Club Books:

- 1983. A Beast the Color of Winter: The Mountain Goat Observed. The natural history, ecology, and behavior of the mountain goat.
- 1990. The Kingdom. A large format work on North American wildlife with photography by Art Wolfe. 204pp.
- 1992. The Fate of the Elephant. British Edition by Viking/Penguin. Selected as one of the Best Books of the Year by the New York Times Book Review. 492pp.
- 2003. True Grizz. The lives of some individual bears in northwestern Montana and of the people learning to live with them. 176pp.
- 2006. The Grandest of Lives: Eye to eye with whales.

Globe Pequot Press:

- 2007. Growing up Grizzly. A children's book – the true story of a big-hearted mother grizzly, her cubs, and an adopted juvenile. Photographs by Amy Shapira.

Bison Books/University of Nebraska Press:

- 2002. A Beast the Color of Winter. Reissue with new introduction.

National Geographic Books:

- 1987. The Last Wildernesses. Chapter on Asian deserts, New Guinea, and ethnobiology studies among the Kayapo people of Amazonia, in Into the Unknown.
- 1988. Mount Kenya. Chapter on life zones and ecology, in Mountain Worlds.
- 1988. Introduction to 1988 calendar, Natural Wonders of the World.
- 1989. Guarding Nature’s Heritage. Chapter on Soviet nature reserves, in Nature's Wonderlands.
- 1990. Siberia and the Pacific Rim. Chapter in The Soviet Union Today.
- 1991. Rocky Shores. Chapter in The Curious Naturalist.
- 1995. Enduring America. An evocation of our continent's native life and landscapes. 200pp.
- 1996. Introduction to 1996 calendar, Nature's World of Wonders.
- 1996. The Company We Keep. America’s Endangered Species, with photographer Joel Sartore. 160pp.
- 2000. Yellowstone to Yukon. Heart of the Rockies bioregion, with photographer Raymond Gehman. 200pp.
- 2002. Exploring America’s Wild & Scenic Rivers. Our national river protection system. 200pp.
- 2017. The Photo Ark. Text by Douglas Chadwick.

Island Press:

- 1991. Introduction to the book Landscape Linkages and Biodiversity, xv-xxvi.

St. Remy Press

- 1993. Royal Chitwan. Chapter on Chitwan National Park, Nepal, in Wildest Places on Earth.

The Nature Company:

- 1993. Introduction to Wolf, Spirit of the Wild.
- 1994. Introduction for 1994 wolf calendar.

Key Porter Books:

- 1977. The Grizzly’s Rage to Live. Chapter in Great Bear Adventures, edited by Andy Russell. Reprinted from Sports Illustrated article, July 18, 1977.

The Lyons Press:

- 2002. Nerd Science and Miracles in Supratropical Montana. Chapter on forest ecology in The Roadless Yaak, Rick Bass, ed.

Mountaineers Books:

- 2005. Y2Y: The Power of Connections. Introductory chapter to Yellowstone to Yukon: Freedom to Roam.
- 2010. And Trees in the Salmon. Summary chapter for Salmon in the Trees, a book on the Tongass National Forest, Alaska, Amy Gulick, photographer.
- 2014. Crown of the Continent: The Wildest Rockies. Introductory chapter.

Riverbend Publishing:

- 2004. Protecting the Crown. Afterword to Crown of the Continent, by Ralph Waldt.

Rocky Mountain Land Library:

- 2006. Real Bear Clawing the Backbone of the World. Chapter from True Grizz reprinted in The Landscape of Home, an anthology.

=== Essays and reporting ===
- Chadwick, Douglas H. (March 2010). "Wolf Wars". National Geographic. 217 (3): 34–55. Archived from the original on February 20, 2010.
