= Into the Grizzly Maze =

- Theatrical release poster
- Directed by: David Hackl
- Screenplay by: Guy Moshe; Jack Reher
- Story by: Jack Reher
- Produced by: Paul Schiff; Tai Duncan; Hadeel Reda
- Starring: James Marsden; Thomas Jane; Piper Perabo; Scott Glenn; Billy Bob Thornton
- Cinematography: James Liston
- Edited by: Michael N. Knue; Andrew Coutts
- Music by: Marcus Trumpp
- Production companies: Indomitable Entertainment; Paul Schiff Productions
- Distributed by: Destination Films
- Release dates: May 19, 2015 (VOD); June 26, 2015 (United States)
- Running time: 94 minutes
- Country: United States
- Language: English
- Budget: $10 million

Into the Grizzly Maze (originally titled Red Machine, then changed to Endangered and later to Grizzly) is a 2015 American action horror film directed by David Hackl from a screenplay by Guy Moshe and Jack Reher. It stars James Marsden, Thomas Jane, Piper Perabo, Scott Glenn, and Billy Bob Thornton. The plot follows two estranged brothers as they reunite at their childhood home in the Alaskan wilderness. The pair are then led to the Grizzly Maze, where they are stalked by a massive, unrelenting, and bloodthirsty grizzly bear. The film was released on video on demand on May 19, 2015, before a limited release on June 26, 2015.

== Plot ==
In the Alaskan wilderness, at the Grizzly Maze, brothers Beckett and Rowan Moore encounter a grizzly bear. Years later, the brothers have become estranged; Beckett has become a local deputy while Rowan is an ex-convict. Coming home to Alaska, Rowan meets up with old friend Mary Cadillac, who gives him supplies and asks him to find her husband Johnny. Meanwhile, three hunters are slaughtered by the same bear the brothers encountered years earlier.

At a bar, Rowan meets Amber, both of whom later go to a motel room together. However, Rowan kicks Amber out upon discovering she is a prostitute. Amber is assaulted by her boyfriend Franco, who gets into a fight with Rowan. Soon after, Rowan sees Beckett for the first time upon his release from prison; Beckett reveals he has married a deaf-mute wildlife photographer and conservationist named Michelle. Rowan reveals he returned to go to the Grizzly Maze and pay respects to their father. Meanwhile, in the woods, two loggers and their dog are killed by the bear.

After the brothers visit their mother's grave, Beckett gets a radio call about the deaths. Following a map, Rowan comes across a car belonging to Johnny Cadillac. While Beckett investigates the logging incident, hunter and butcher Douglas arrives and tells them that the bear that killed the loggers is a larger and smarter specimen than normal. While Douglas offers his help to track it, Beckett, accompanied by Rowan's ex-girlfriend Kaley, goes out to the Maze to find Rowan and Michelle, who had gone missing.

Michelle comes face to face with the bear, but in doing so, gets caught in a trap she set. Rowan arrives and scares off the bear. Sully visits Douglas, who once again informs him that this bear is exacting its wrath due to the poaching and logging rather than satisfying its hunger or establishing its territory. When Zoe, one of Sully's deputies, finds the abandoned car, she is killed by the bear. After Douglas agrees to hunt and kill the bear, Sully and Jerry investigate the car. Beckett and Kaley meet up with Michelle and Rowan.

Michelle and Beckett look at a satellite image of their tagged bears and hypothesize they are running away because of the larger bear; Kaley is attacked by the bear and Rowan and Beckett try to shoot it, the bear runs off. As the bear continues to follow the group, Michelle falls into a dead moose carcass, only to find it is a kill zone full of dead moose. The group decides to make it through the Maze. Sully goes to get the group out by boat. The group encounters Douglas standing over one of Beckett and Michelle's collared bears. Initially believing he killed it, a video recording shows the collared bear was attacked by the larger bear.

Separating from Douglas, the group encounters the bear again. After the group spots the butcher cabin, they find Johnny has died. Setting up camp, Rowan explains to Kaley, during one night in the Maze, Rowan went to Johnny to sell drugs for money. Being a guide to Johnny and his drug dealer, Rowan took the two into the Maze. During a deal, Rowan and the two were hit by state troopers. However, Rowan noticed a ranger was injured and was about to get killed by someone else, but Rowan saved the ranger.

As Sully comes in on his boat, Douglas shoots the bear, and Rowan and Beckett do not find him. Rowan stays behind to distract the bear while Beckett gets the girls to the boat. Rowan manages to make the bear chase him. After Michelle becomes separated from the group, the bear corners her, and Douglas is killed by the bear.

The trio makes it to the boat and is encountered by Sully, who reveals he had let poachers loose into the Maze. The bear arrives and kills Sully. While Rowan and Beckett fight the bear, Beckett pours gasoline around the bear and sets the circle on fire, hoping to trap it. However, the bear runs through the flames and brings down the boat. Protecting the group, Rowan kills the bear, and the group leaves the Maze.

== Cast ==
- James Marsden as Rowan Moore
  - Carson Reaume as Young Rowan Moore
- Thomas Jane as Beckett Moore
  - Seth Isaac Johnson as Young Beckett Moore
- Piper Perabo as Michelle Moore
- Scott Glenn as Sully
- Michaela McManus as Kaley
- Billy Bob Thornton as Douglass
- Adam Beach as Johnny Cadillac
- Kelly Curran as Amber
- Reese Alexander as Gerry Smith
- Luisa D'Oliveira as Zoe Langford
- Sean O. Roberts as Franco
- Mariel Belanger as Mary Cadillac
- Bill Croft as Pike
- Mark Acheson as Dooly
- Michael Jonsson as Patrick
- Patrick Sabongui as Marcus
- Garry Chalk as Greg
- Alvin Sanders as Bartender
- Sarah Desjardins as Sydnee
- Bart the Bear 2 as Red Machine The Bear

== Production ==
On January 19, 2012, James Marsden, Thomas Jane, and Billy Bob Thornton joined the cast of the thriller, then titled Red Machine. Later that month, Piper Perabo also joined the film cast to play the role of Jane's fiancée. According to Deadline Hollywood, filming began in Vancouver, British Columbia, Canada in February 2012. The producers are Tai Duncan, Hadeel Reda, and Paul Schiff.

On February 2, 2012, more cast members were added, including Scott Glenn, Adam Beach, Michaela McManus and Kelly Curran. Animal actor Bart the Bear 2 was also hired to co-star. He hailed from Heber City, Utah's Wasatch Rocky Mountain Wildlife. On February 27, 2013, Open Road Films acquired the distribution rights of the film. Open Road also changed the title of the film from Red Machine to Endangered.

== Release ==
After Open Road Films acquired the distribution rights of the film, the studio dropped the project and Vertical Entertainment and Destination Films acquired distribution rights instead and released the film on video on demand on May 19, 2015, before a limited release on June 26, 2015.

== Reception ==
On review aggregator website Rotten Tomatoes, the film has an approval rating of 36% based on 11 reviews, with an average rating of 4.5/10. The film has a score of 43% on Metacritic out of 4 reviews, indicating "mixed or average" reviews.
