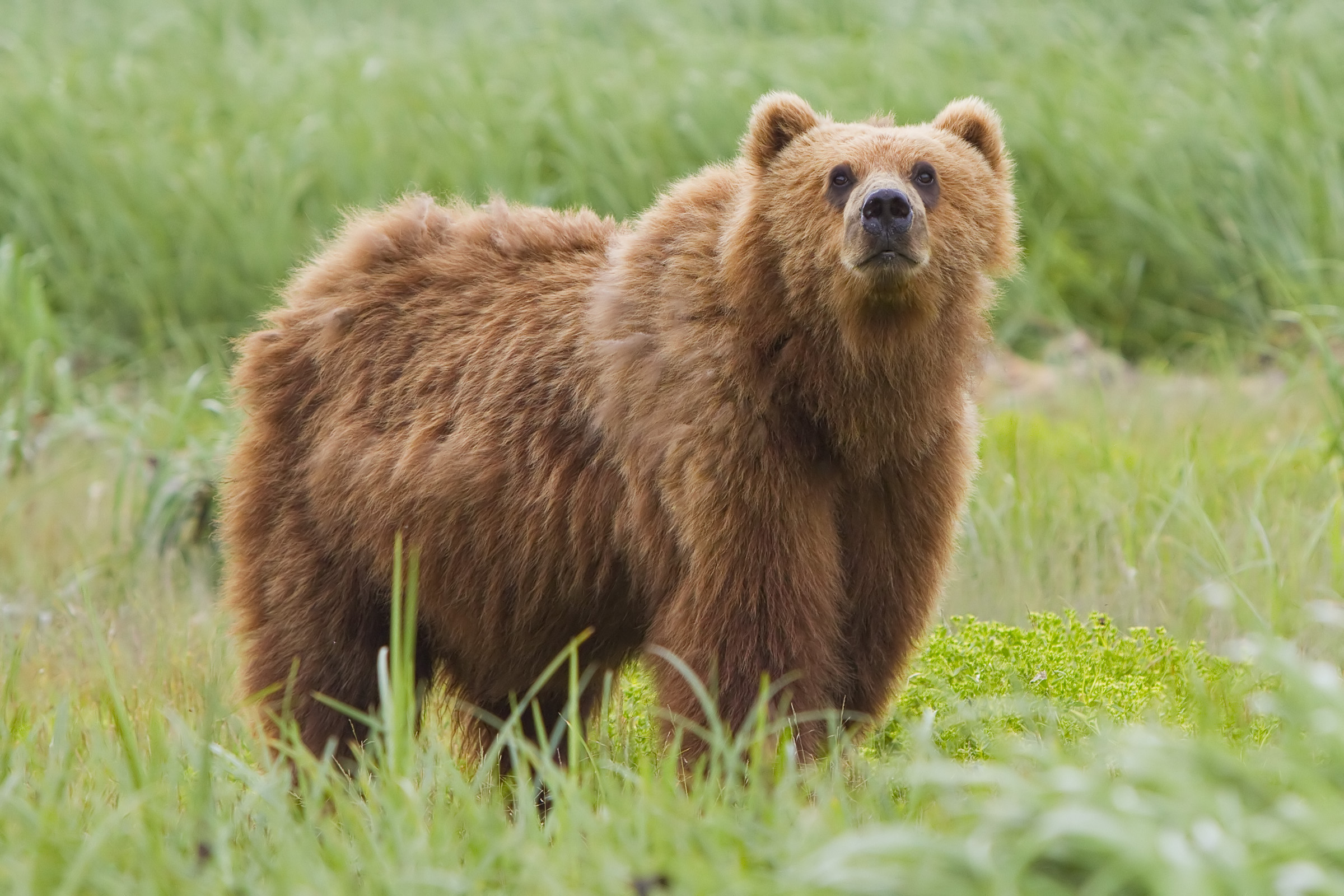
- in Kodiak Island, Alaska, US.

Conservation status
- Least Concern (IUCN 3.1)

Scientific classification
- Kingdom: Animalia
- Phylum: Chordata
- Class: Mammalia
- Order: Carnivora
- Family: Ursidae
- Genus: Ursus
- Species: U. arctos
- Subspecies: U. a. middendorffi

Trinomial name
- Ursus arctos middendorffi Merriam, 1896
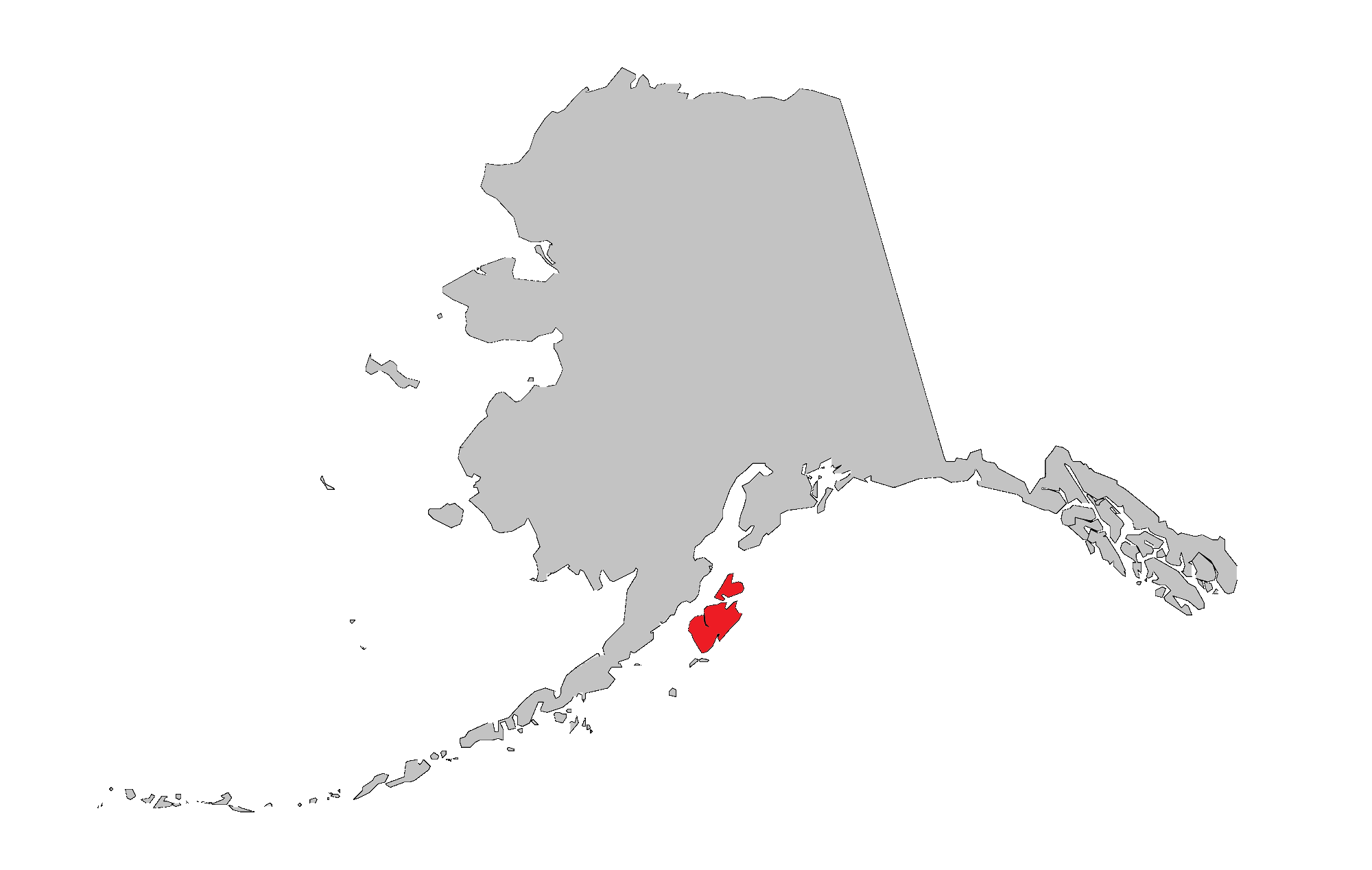
- Kodiak bear range within Alaska

= Kodiak bear =

Largest subspecies of brown bears/grizzly bears

The Kodiak bear (Ursus arctos middendorffi), also known as the Kodiak brown bear and sometimes the Alaskan brown bear, inhabits the islands of the Kodiak Archipelago in southwest Alaska. It is one of the largest recognized subspecies or population of the brown bear, and one of the two largest kinds of bears alive today, the other being the polar bear. While mostly recognized a subspecies on its own, others consider it just an insular population of the grizzly bear subspecies.

Physiologically and physically, the Kodiak bear is very similar to the other brown bear subspecies, such as the mainland grizzly (Ursus arctos horribilis) and the extinct California grizzly bear (U. a. californicus), with the main difference being size, as Kodiak bears are on average 1.5 to 2 times larger than their cousins. Despite this large variation in size, the diet and lifestyle of the Kodiak bear do not differ greatly from those of other brown bears.

Kodiak bears have interacted with humans for centuries, especially hunters and other people in the rural coastal regions of the archipelago. The bears are hunted for sport and are encountered by hunters pursuing other species. Less frequently, Kodiak bears are killed by people whose property (such as livestock) or person are threatened. In recent history there has been an increasing focus on conservation and protection of the Kodiak bear population as human activity in its range increases. The IUCN classifies the brown bear (Ursus arctos), of which the Kodiak is a subspecies, as being of "least concern" in terms of endangerment or extinction, though the IUCN does not differentiate between subspecies and thus does not provide a conservation status for the Kodiak population. The Alaska Department of Fish and Game, along with the United States Fish and Wildlife Service to a lesser extent, closely monitor the size and health of the population and the number of bears hunted in the state.

== Description ==
=== Taxonomy ===
Taxonomist C.H. Merriam was the first to recognize the Kodiak bear as a unique subspecies of the brown bear, and he named it "Ursus middendorffi" in honor of the celebrated Baltic naturalist, Dr. A. Th. von Middendorff. Subsequent taxonomic work merged all North American brown bears into a single species (Ursus arctos). Genetic samples from bears on Kodiak have shown that they are most closely related to brown bears on the Alaska Peninsula and Kamchatka, Russia, and all brown bears roughly north of the US. Kodiak bears have been genetically isolated since at least the last ice age (10,000 to 12,000 years ago) and very little genetic diversity exists within the population. Although the current population is healthy, productive, and has shown no overt adverse signs of inbreeding, it may be more susceptible to new diseases or parasites than other, more diverse brown bear populations.

=== Color ===
Hair colors range from pale blonde to orange (typically females or bears from southern parts of the archipelago) to dark brown. Cubs will often retain a white "natal ring" around their neck for the first few years of life. The Kodiak bear's color is similar to that of its close relatives, the mainland American Grizzly bear and Eurasian brown bears.

=== Size ===
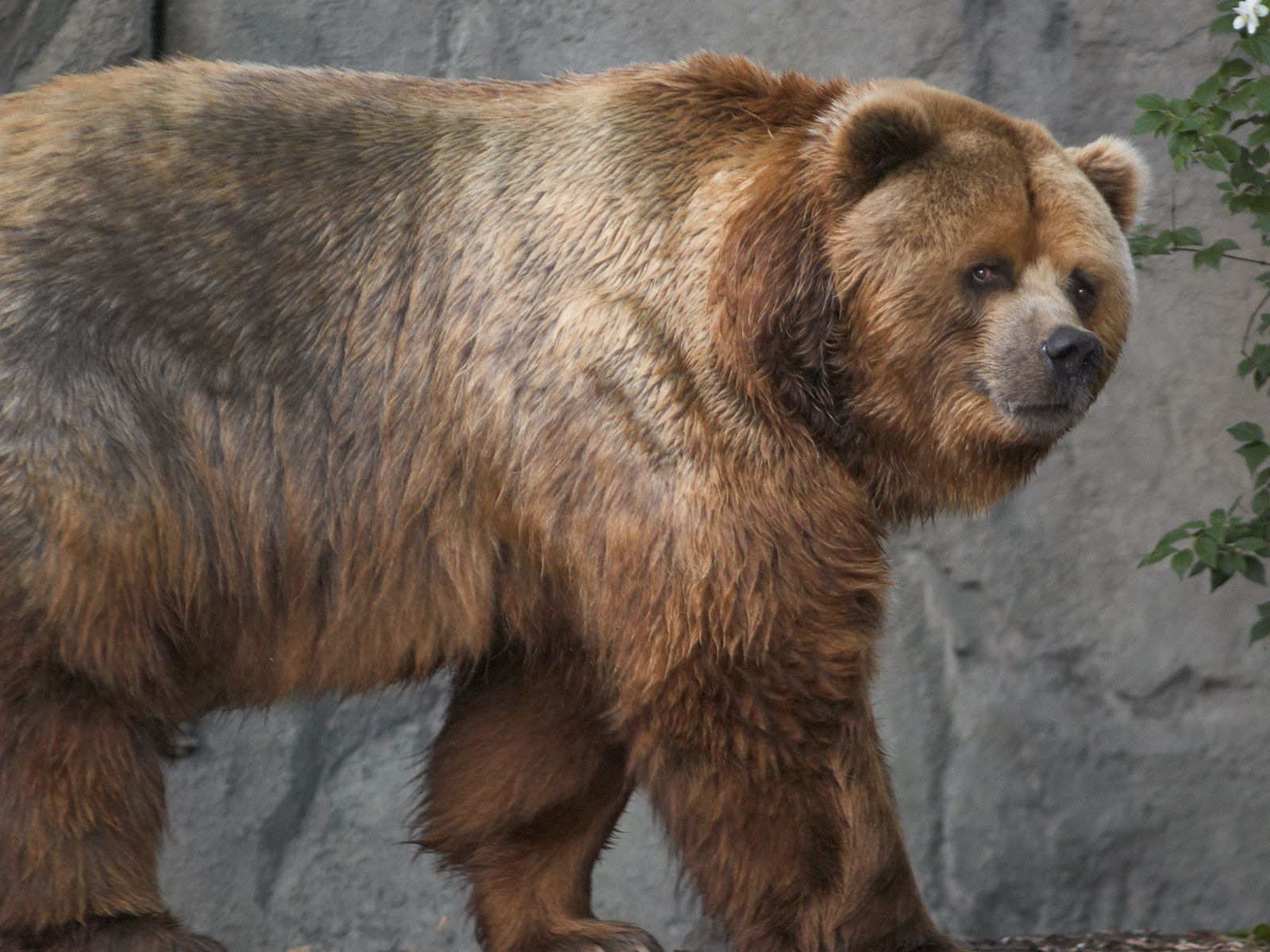
Adult in a zoo in Germany

While there is generally much variation in size between brown bears in different areas, most usually weigh between 115 and 360 kg (254 and 794 lb); the Kodiak bear illustrates island gigantism, commonly reaching sizes of 300 to 600 kg (660 to 1,320 lb). The size range for females (sows) is from 181 to 318 kg (399 to 701 lb), and for males (boars), it is 272 to 635 kg (600 to 1,400 lb). Mature males average 477–534 kg (1,052–1,177 lb) over the course of the year, and can weigh up to 680 kg (1,500 lb) at peak times. Females are typically about 20% smaller and 30% lighter than males, and adult sizes are attained when they are six years old. Bears weigh the least when they emerge from their dens in the spring, and can increase their weight by 20–30% during late summer and autumn. As with other animals, captive Kodiak bears can sometimes weigh considerably more than their wild counterparts.

An average adult male measures 244 cm (8 ft 0 in) in length, and stands 133 cm (4 ft 4 in) tall at the shoulder. The largest recorded wild male weighed 751 kg (1,656 lb), and had a hind foot measurement of 46 cm (18 in). A large male Kodiak bear stands up to 1.5 m (4.9 ft) tall at the shoulder when it is standing on all four legs. When standing fully upright on its hind legs, a large male could reach a height of 3 m (9.8 ft). The largest verified size for a captive Kodiak bear was for a specimen that lived at the Dakota Zoo in Bismarck, North Dakota. Nicknamed "Clyde", he weighed 966 kg (2,130 lb) when he died in June 1987 at the age of 22. According to zoo director Terry Lincoln, Clyde probably weighed close to 1,089 kg (2,400 lb) a year earlier. He still had a fat layer of 9 in (23 cm) when he died. (Note: For comparison, the record for the Californian grizzly and polar bears in the wilderness is about 998 kg (2,200 lb).).

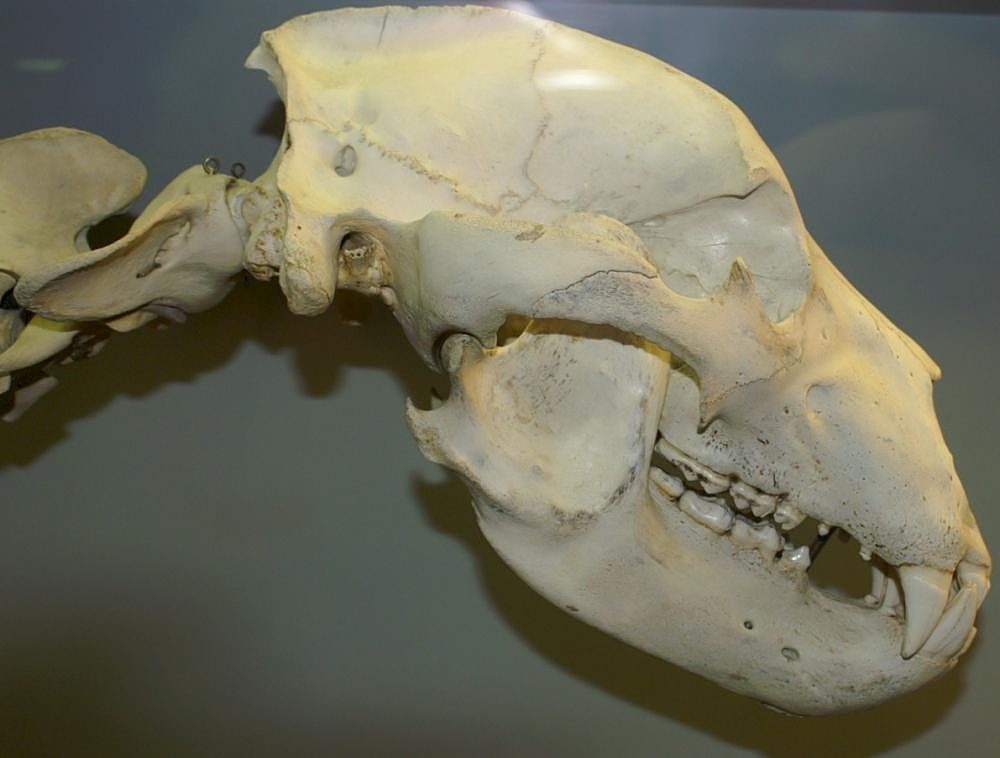
Kodiak bear's skull at the Smithsonian National Museum of Natural History.

Kodiak bears are the largest brown bear and are even comparable in size to polar bears. This makes Kodiak bears and polar bears the two largest members of the bear family and the largest extant terrestrial (Note: Treating Pinnipeds as marine mammals.) carnivorans.

The standard method of evaluating the size of bears is by measuring their skulls. Most North American hunting organizations and management agencies use calipers to measure the length of the skull (back of sagittal crest on the back of the skull to the front tooth), and the width (maximum width between the zygomatic arches — "cheek bones"). The total skull size is the sum of these two measurements. The largest bear ever killed in North America was from Kodiak Island, with a total skull size of 78.1 cm (30.7 in), and eight of the top 10 brown bears listed in the Boone and Crockett record book are from Kodiak. The average skull size of Kodiak bears that were killed by hunters in the first five years of the 21st century was 63.8 cm (25.1 in) for boars, and 55.4 cm (21.8 in) for sows.

In addition, an individual named Teddy, which portrayed a killer bear in the movie Grizzly, stood 3.4 metres (11 ft) tall on its hind legs and was the largest bear in captivity at the time.

== Distribution and Habitat ==
This brown bear population occurs only on the islands of the Kodiak Archipelago (Kodiak, Afognak, Shuyak, Raspberry, Uganik, Sitkalidak, and adjacent islands). The Kodiak bear population was estimated to include 3,526 bears in 2005, yielding an estimated archipelago-wide population density of 270 bears per 1000 km^{2} (700 per 1000 sq. mi). During the past decade [when?], the population has been slowly increasing.

=== Home range ===
Bears on Kodiak are naturally active during the day, but when faced with competition for food or space, they adopt a more nocturnal (active at night) lifestyle. This behavior is especially evident in the bears that live near and within Kodiak City. Kodiak bears do not defend territories, but they do have traditional areas that they use each year (home ranges). Because of the rich variety of foods available on Kodiak, the bears on the archipelago have some of the smallest home ranges of any brown bear populations in North America and a great deal of overlap occurs among the ranges of individual bears. Home ranges of adult sows on Kodiak Island average 130 km^{2} (50 sq mi), while boar home ranges average 250 km^{2} (97 sq mi).

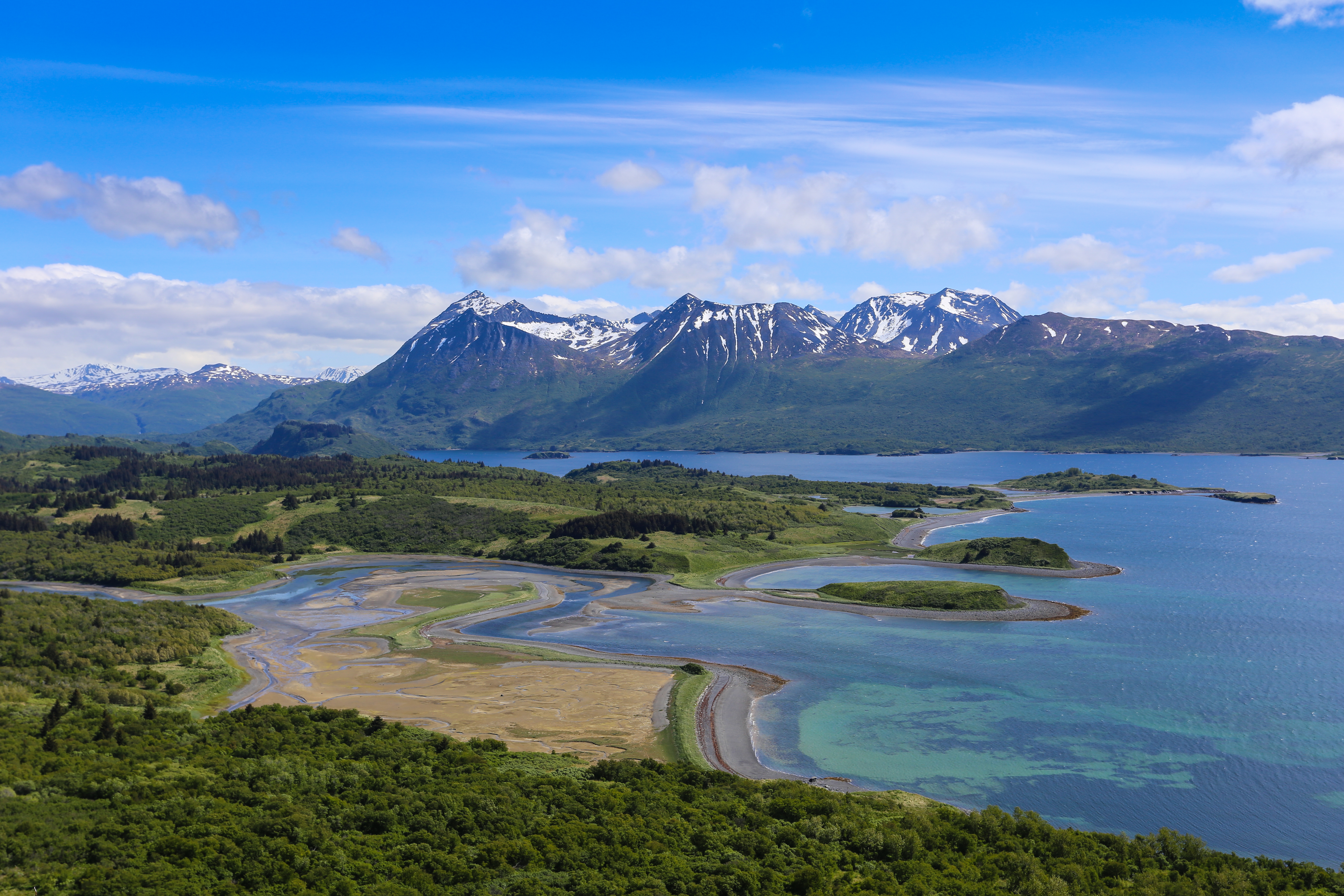
A part of Uganik Bay on Kodiak Island, a common feeding spot for Kodiak Bears.

=== Habitat ===
The islands of the Kodiak Archipelago have a subpolar oceanic climate with cool temperatures, overcast skies, fog, windy conditions, and moderate to heavy precipitation throughout most of the year. Although the archipelago only covers about 13,000 km^{2} (5,000 sq mi), a rich variety of topography and vegetation ranges from dense forests of Sitka spruce on the northern islands, to steep, glaciated mountains rising to Koniag Peak's 1,360 m (4,470 ft) along the central spine of Kodiak Island, to rolling hills and flat tundra on the south end of the archipelago. About 14,000 people live on the archipelago, primarily in and around the city of Kodiak and six outlying villages. Roads and other human alterations are generally limited to Afognak Island and the northeastern part of Kodiak Island. About half of the archipelago is included in the Kodiak National Wildlife Refuge.

== Behavior and Life History ==
=== Denning ===
Kodiak bears begin entering their dens in late October. Pregnant sows are usually the first to go to dens; males are the last. Males begin emerging from their dens in early April, while sows with new cubs may stay in dens until late June. Bears living on the north end of Kodiak Island tend to have longer denning periods than bears in the southern areas. Most Kodiak bears dig their dens in hill or mountain sides and they use a wide variety of denning habitats depending on which part of the archipelago they live. Almost a quarter of the adult bears forgo denning, staying somewhat active throughout the winter.

=== Reproduction and survival ===
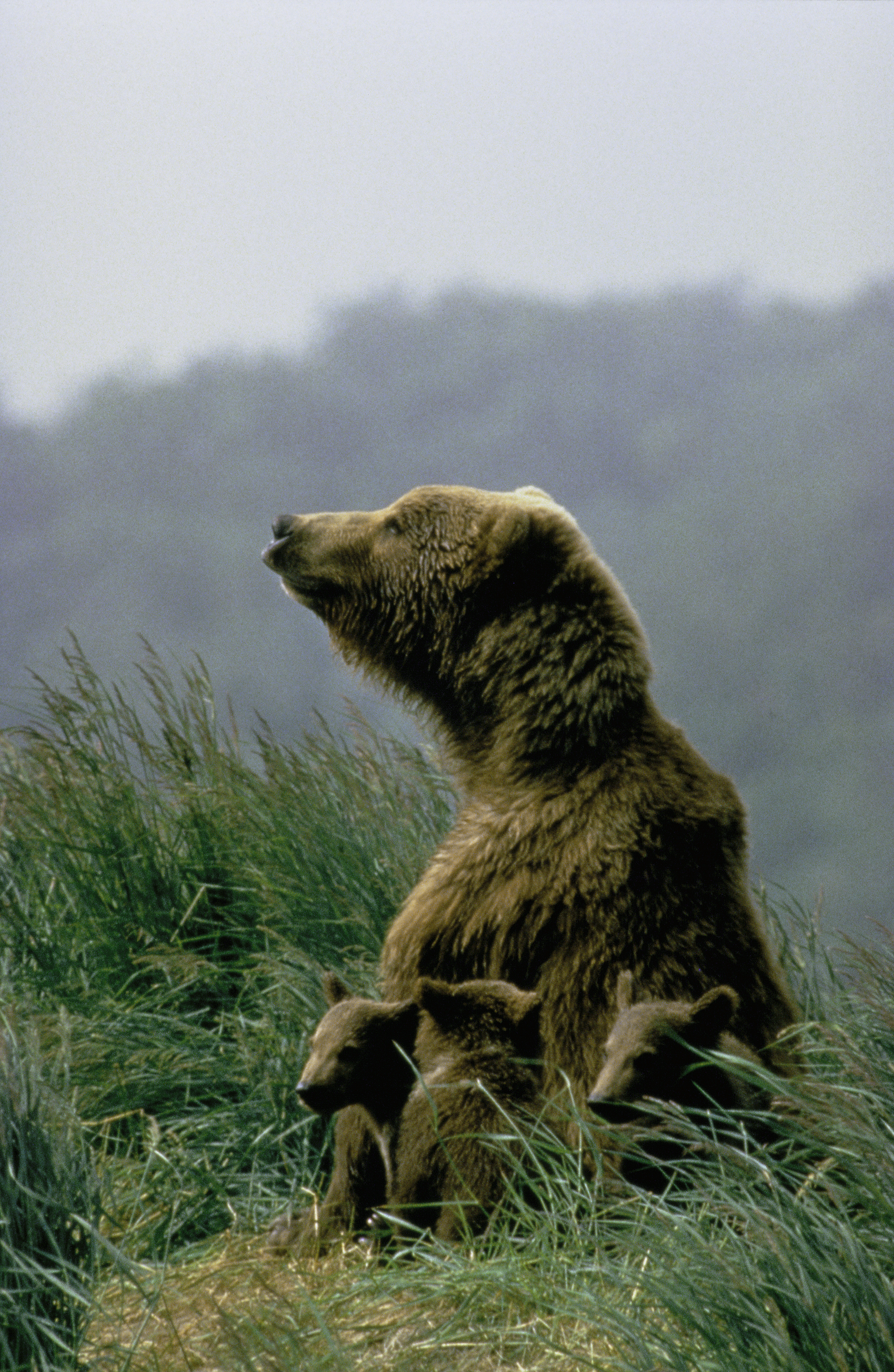
Mother bear with cubs

Kodiak bears reach sexual maturity at age five, but most sows are over nine years old when they successfully wean their first litter. The average time between litters is four years. Sows continue to produce cubs throughout their lives, but their productivity diminishes after they are 20 years old. Mating season for Kodiak bears is during May and June. They are serially monogamous (having one partner at a time), staying together from two days to two weeks. As soon as the egg is fertilized and divides a few times, it enters a state of suspended animation until autumn when it finally implants on the uterine wall and begins to grow again. Cubs are born in the den during January or February. Weighing less than 450 g (1 lb) at birth with little hair and closed eyes, they suckle for several months, emerging from the den in May or June, weighing 6.8–9.1 kilograms (15–20 pounds). Typical litter sizes on Kodiak are two or three cubs, with a long-term average of 2.4 cubs per litter. However, Kodiak bears have six functional nipples and can litter up to six cubs reportedly. Sows are sometimes seen with five or six cubs in tow, probably due to adopting cubs from other litters. Most cubs stay with their mothers for three years. Almost half of the cubs die before they leave, with cannibalism by adult males being one of the major causes of death.

Kodiak bears that have recently left their mothers, at ages 3–5 years, have high mortality rates with roughly 56% of males and 89% of females surviving. Most young female bears stay within or near their mother's home range, while most males move farther away. Most adult sows die of natural causes (56%), while most adult male bears are killed by hunters (91%). The oldest known male bear in the wild was 27 years old, and the oldest female was 35.

=== Feeding habits ===
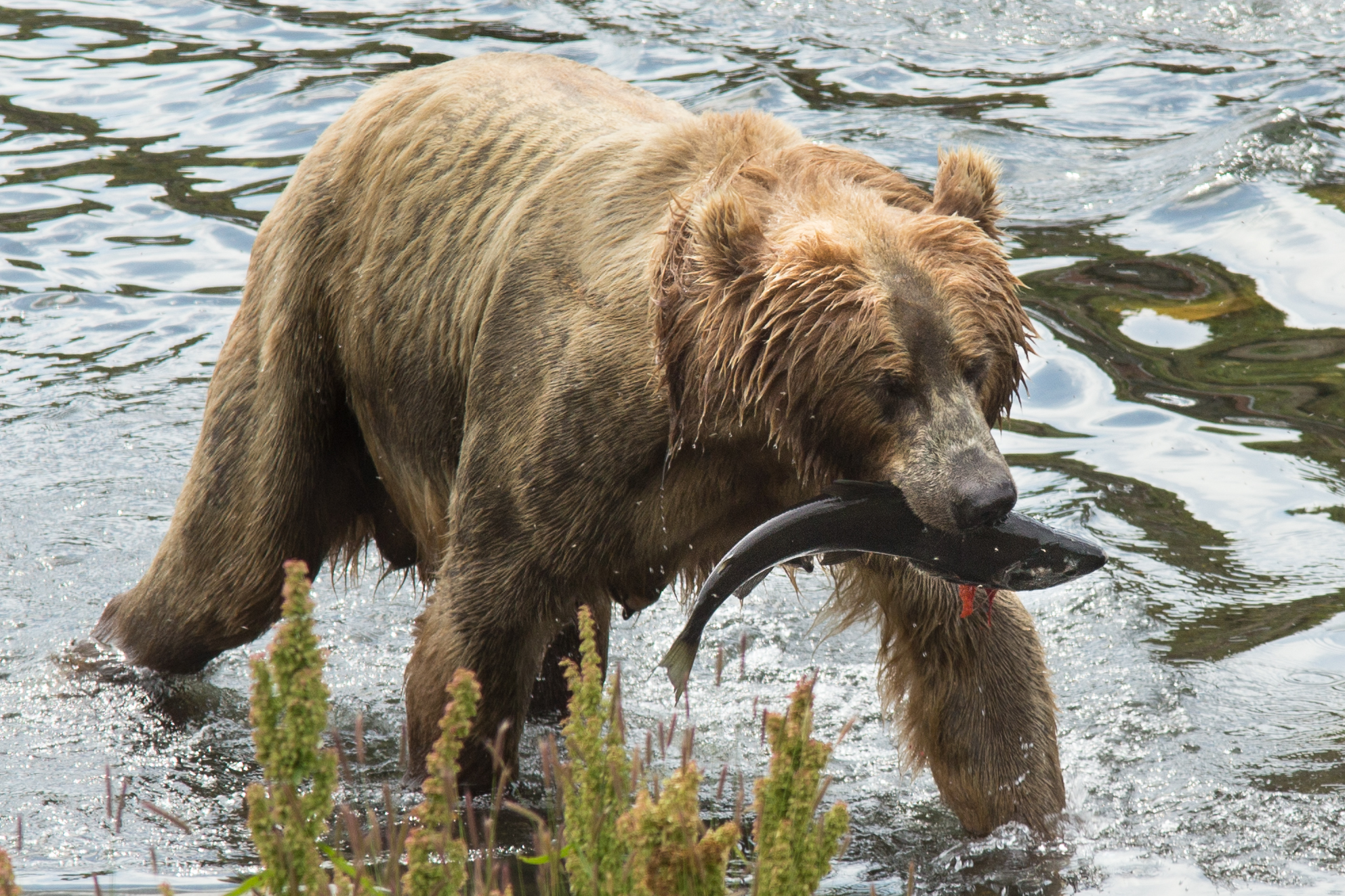
Sow with a fish

Bears live throughout the archipelago, adapting to local resources and retaining relatively small home ranges and comparable densities in most habitats. With such a variety and abundance of food sources, bears are surprisingly intelligent in their eating habits. The first foods bears eat in the spring are emerging vegetation (such as grasses and forbs) and animals that may have died during the winter. This allows the bear to quickly replace the weight that was lost during hibernation. As summer progresses, a wide variety of vegetation supplies nutritional needs until salmon return. Salmon runs extend from May through September on most of the archipelago and bears consume the five species of Pacific salmon that spawn in local streams and lakes. Bears often prioritize the brain, flesh, and eggs of salmon for their high nutritional value. In the late summer and early fall, bears consume several types of berries when they reach their ripest point, and have the highest levels of sugar. As climate change causes elderberries to ripen earlier, berry season is now overlapping with salmon season and some bears are abandoning salmon runs to focus on the berries. Bears also feed on wind-rowed seaweed and invertebrates on some beaches throughout the year. When eating deer, mountain goats, elk, or cattle, internal organs are eaten first for their high-fat content, however even though there is an abundance of the animals found on the archipelago, few Kodiak bears actively prey on them as other methods of finding food are more energy efficient. Another food source available year-round is the garbage made by the human population of Kodiak Island.

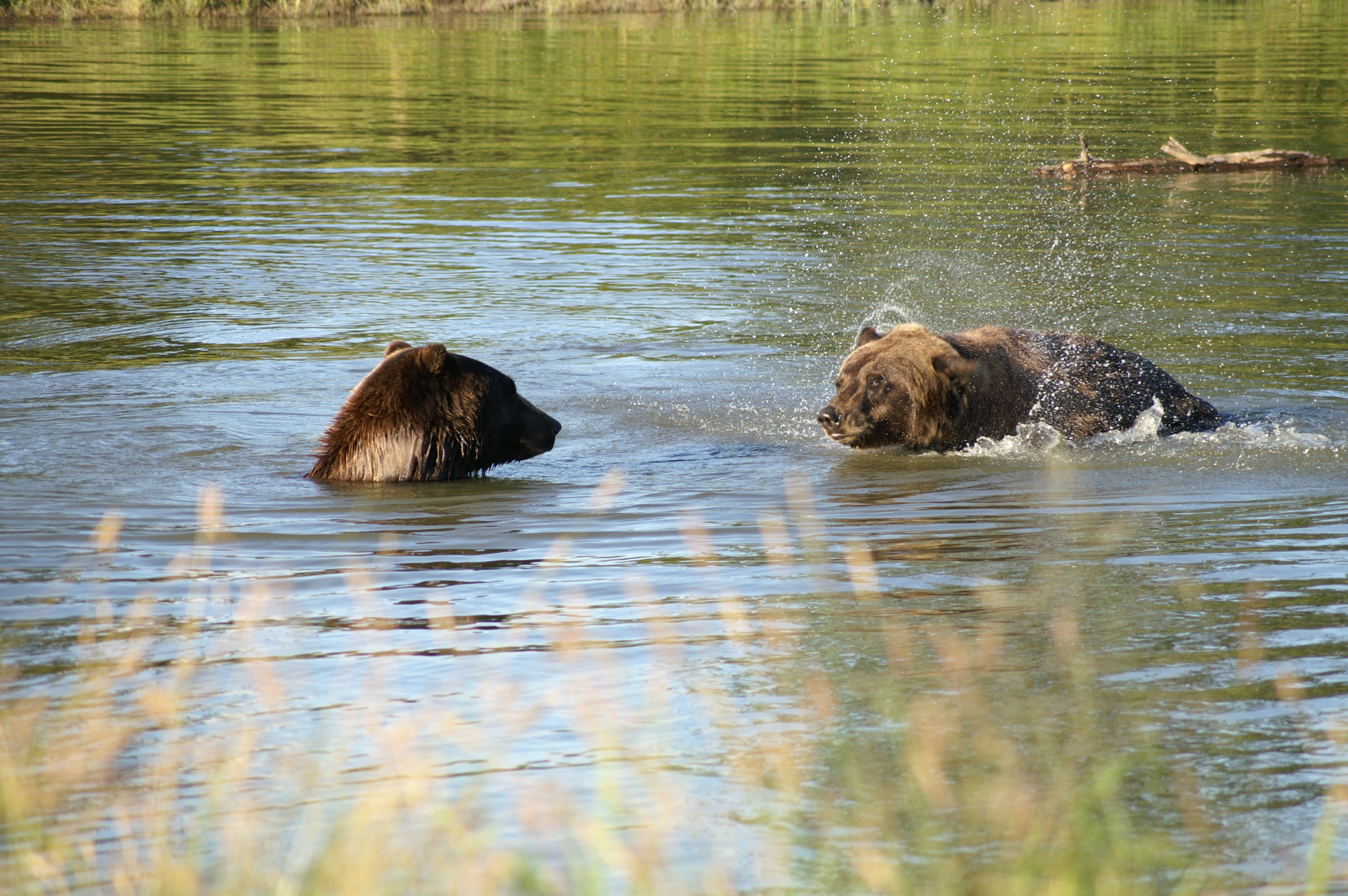
Two adult Alaskan brown bears at the Alaska Wildlife Conservation Center

The Kodiak bear is much like other brown bears in intelligence, although its tendency to feed in large dense groups leads to more complex social behaviors. Kodiak bears are generally solitary in nature; however, when food is concentrated in small areas, such as along salmon spawning streams, grass/sedge flats, berry patches, a dead whale, or even an open garbage dump, they often occur in large groups. Along a few streams on Kodiak, up to 60 bears can be seen simultaneously in a 2.6 km^{2} (1.0 sq mi) area. To maximize food intake at these ecologically important areas, bears have learned to minimize fighting and fatal interactions by developing a complex communication (both verbal and body posturing) and social structure.

=== Interacting with people ===
Usually, Kodiak bears attempt to avoid encounters with people. The most notable exceptions to this behavior pattern occur when bears are surprised, threatened, or attracted by human food, garbage, or hunter-killed game. However, there has been an increase in Kodiak encounters due to increases in the local population as well as increased hunting of Kodiak bears. Bear safety precautions aim at avoiding such situations, understanding bear needs and behavior, and learning how to recognize the warning signs bears give when stressed.

One fatal bear attack on a person on the Kodiak archipelago occurred in 1999. The National Geographic Society filmed a television program about brown bears, which included a segment on two brown bear attacks. Both incidents involved hunters who were hunting by themselves and were returning to game they had killed previously, and left alone in order to continue hunting. One of the attacks was fatal, with the hunter being killed by the bear, and occurred on Uganik Island (November 3, 1999), which is part of the Kodiak archipelago. In the other incident, after being attacked by the bear, the hunter stabbed it with a knife, then recovered his rifle and killed the attacking bear. This occurred on Raspberry Island, home to two full-service wilderness lodges. Prior to that, the last fatality was in 1921. About once every other year, a bear injures a person on Kodiak. In October 2021, a father and son hunting duo survived an attack from a Kodiak bear during an elk registration hunt on Afognak Island.

== History and management ==
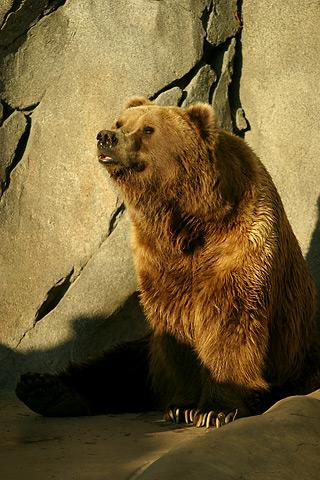
Kodiak bear sitting in captivity

=== Prehistory ===
Early human occupants of the archipelago when the land was locked into the ice age looked to the sea for their sustenance. At that time, Kodiak Natives (Alutiiqs) occasionally hunted bears, using their meat for food, hides for clothing and bedding, and teeth for adornment. Traditional stories often revolved around the similarity between bears and humans, and the mystical nature of bears because of their proximity to the spirit world.

=== Commercial harvests ===
Russian hunters came to the area in the late 18th century to capitalize on the abundant fur resources. Bear hides were considered a "minor fur" and sold for about the same price as river otter pelts. The number of bears harvested increased substantially when sea otter populations declined and after the United States acquired Alaska in 1867, bear harvests on Kodiak increased, peaking at as many as 250 bears per year. Commercial fishing activities increased in the late 1880s and canneries proliferated throughout the archipelago. Bears were viewed as competitors for the salmon resource and were routinely shot when seen on streams or coasts. At the same time, sportsmen and scientists had recognized the Kodiak bear as the largest in the world, and they voiced concerns about overharvesting the population.

=== Guided hunters and competition for resources ===
Professional interest in guided Kodiak bear hunts and concern for unregulated resource use in frontier lands such as Alaska prompted the territorial government's newly established Alaska Game Commission to abolish commercial bear hunting (selling the hides) on the archipelago in 1925. The impacts of the new regulations seemed to restore bear populations on the Kodiak Islands. By the 1930s, ranchers in northeast Kodiak reported an increase in bear problems and demanded action. Bears were wrongly seen as a threat to the expanding commercial salmon-fishing industry. To address the dilemma of conserving bears while protecting cattle, salmon, and people, President Franklin D. Roosevelt created the Kodiak National Wildlife Refuge by executive order in 1941. The 7,700 km^{2} (1,900,000 acres) refuge roughly encompasses the southwestern two-thirds of Kodiak Island, Uganik Island, the Red Peaks area on northwestern Afognak Island, and all of Ban Island.

Alaska achieved statehood in 1959 and assumed responsibility for managing the state's wildlife. The Alaska Board of Game reduced bear-hunting seasons on Afognak and Raspberry Islands and on the Kodiak National Wildlife Refuge, but liberalized bear seasons on non-refuge lands on Kodiak. During the 1960s, state biologists worked with ranchers along the Kodiak road system to examine and reduce the predation problem. Biologists reported that cattle and bears were not compatible on the same ranges and potential solutions included poisons, fences to isolate cattle ranges, and aerial shooting of bears. Again, sport hunters voiced their support for Kodiak bears. Despite public pressure, the state continued actively pursuing and dispatching problem bears until 1970.

=== Changes in land status ===
In 1971, the Alaska Native Claims Settlement Act (ANCSA) resolved many long-standing land issues with Aboriginal Alaskans statewide. The impacts were felt strongly on the archipelago as large areas were conveyed to the Native corporations. Federal management of the National Forest lands on Afognak was transferred to Native Corporation ownership with the passage of the Alaska National Interest Lands Conservation Act in 1980 (ANILCA), and the Kodiak National Wildlife Refuge lost control of 130,000 hectares (310,000 acres) of prime bear habitat (more than 17% of refuge lands).

In 1975, construction of a logging road began on Afognak Island, and timber harvesting began in 1977. In 1979, work began on an environmental impact statement for the Terror Lake hydroelectric project on Kodiak Island. That project included an earthen dam on Terror Lake with Kodiak National Wildlife Refuge and a 10 km (6 mi) tunnel through a mountain ridge to a penstock and powerhouse in the Kizhuyak River drainage. The hydro project was the first significant invasion of inland bear habitat on Kodiak Island. To address the opposition encountered from the public and agencies, a mitigation settlement was negotiated in 1981 which included brown bear research and the establishment of the Kodiak Brown Bear Trust. The hydroelectric project was completed in 1985. Human alteration of bear habitat on Kodiak and Afognak Islands spurred renewed interest and funding for bear research on the archipelago, resulting in a surge of baseline and applied bear research on Kodiak through the 1980s and 1990s.

Bears were not directly harmed by the Exxon Valdez oil spill in 1989, although some were displaced from traditional feeding and traveling areas by cleanup crews. No one was injured by a bear, and no Kodiak bears were killed. To mitigate the adverse impacts of the spill, Exxon reached a settlement with the state and federal governments. Paradoxically, the impacts of the oil spill and the subsequent cleanup and settlement proved to be beneficial to bears on Kodiak. Bear-safety training exposed thousands of workers to factual information about bears, and money from the settlement fund was used for funding land acquisitions. By the close of the 20th century, over 80% of the refuge lands that had been lost as a result of ANCSA and ANILCA were reinstated into the refuge, either through direct purchase or utilizing conservation easements. Lands were also purchased in America, Westtown, and Shuyak Islands and transferred into state ownership. The Kodiak Brown Bear Trust coordinated a coalition of sportsmen and other wildlife conservation groups from around the nation to lobby for the use of settlement funds to acquire Kodiak lands. The groups also directly contributed funding to protect small parcels of important bear habitat around the islands.

=== Kodiak Archipelago Bear Conservation and Management Plan ===
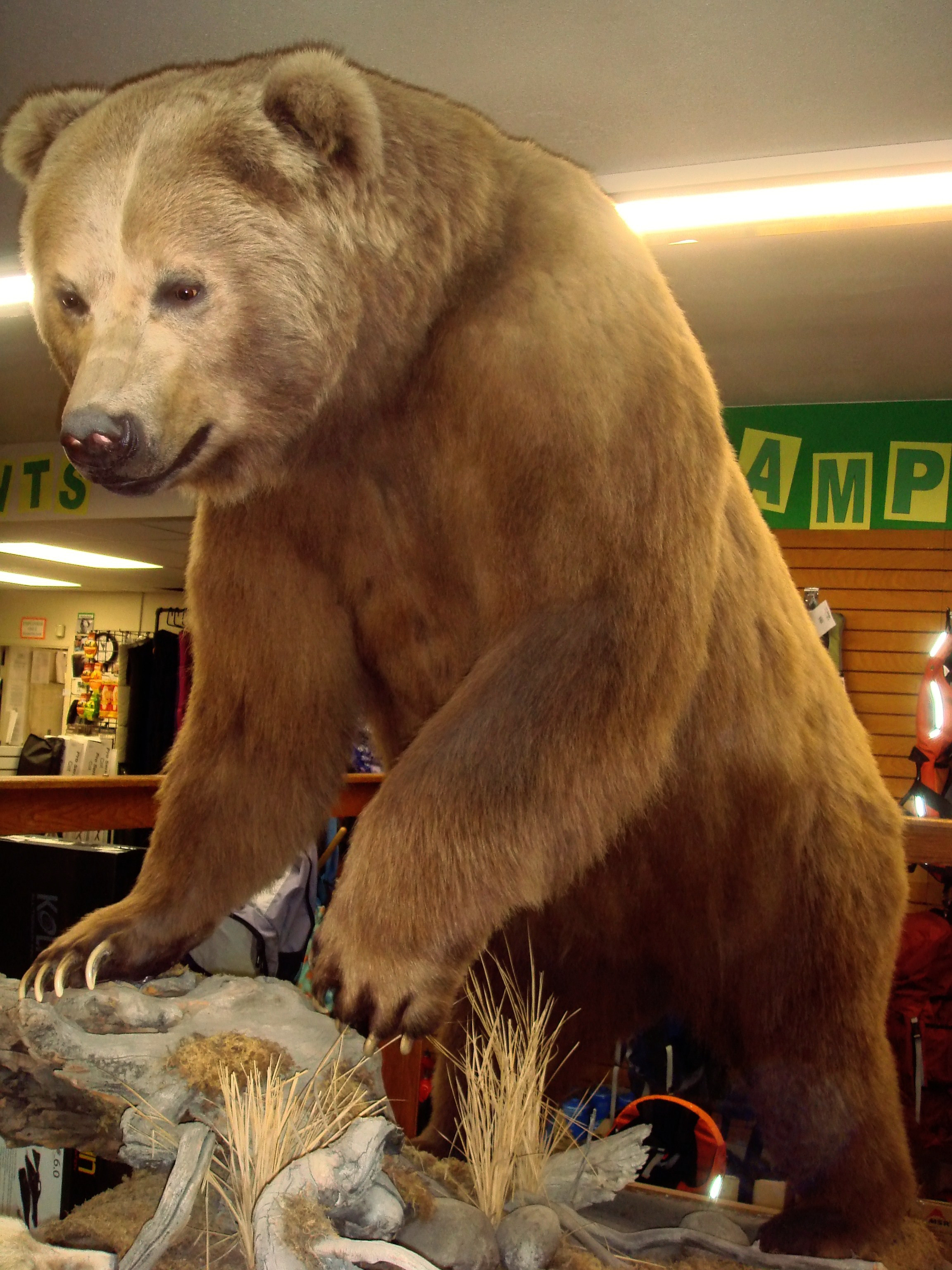
Taxidermized bear in a sporting-goods store in Kodiak, which has the island's only commercial airport and which is where hunters obtain state licenses and begin their hunts

In 2001, a citizens advisory committee was established to work closely with the Alaska Department of Fish and Game (ADF&G), with the cooperation of Kodiak NWR, to develop a management plan addressing several problems that affect bears, including hunting, habitat, and viewing. The resulting Kodiak Archipelago Bear Conservation and Management Plan was crafted over several months by representatives from 12 diverse user groups, which, after hearing from a variety of experts from agencies and receiving extensive public input, developed more than 270 recommendations for managing and conserving Kodiak bears. Despite the diversity of viewpoints expressed by members of the group, all of the recommendations were by consensus.

The underlying themes of the recommendations were continued conservation of the bear population at its current level, increased education programs to teach people how to live with bears on Kodiak, and protection of bear habitat with allowances for continued human use of the archipelago. Although the group's role is merely advisory, government management agencies expressed a commitment to implement all of the regulations that were feasible and within their legal jurisdictions.

=== Genetic diversity and endangerment ===
The International Union for Conservation of Nature Red List does not list subspecies. The brown bear species, of which the Kodiak subspecies is a member, is listed as Lower Risk or Least Concern. The Kodiak is not listed as an endangered species by the Endangered Species Act of the U.S. Fish and Wildlife Service.

=== Hunt-management ===
Kodiak bear research and habitat protection is done cooperatively by the ADF&G and Kodiak National Wildlife Refuge. Bear hunting is managed by the ADF&G, and hunting regulations are established by the Alaska Board of Game. Currently, a finely tuned management system distributes hunters in 32 different areas during two seasons (spring: April 1 – May 15, and fall: October 25 – November 30). Each year, about 4,500 people apply for the 496 permits offered for Kodiak bear hunts (two-thirds to Alaska residents, one-third to non-residents). Nonresidents are required to hire a registered guide who is authorized to hunt in a particular area, and this can cost from $10,000 to $22,000. All hunters must come into the Alaska Department of Fish and Game office in Kodiak before going into the field for a brief orientation and must check out before they leave the island. Every bear that is legally killed on the archipelago must be inspected by an ADF&G wildlife biologist before it can be taken from the islands. Pelts receive a metal locking tag from an ADF&G officer if the hunter and guide provide proper documentation to prove licensing. Pelts cannot be transported or legally preserved or sold without the official metal locking tag. A tag is also applied to the skull, which is measured and recorded. Hunting laws are strictly enforced by the ADF&G officers who often have the full support of the local community. Illegal hunting and fishing is frowned upon by the community which maintains a healthy respect for the island's environmental laws, as well. Stiff penalties accompany illegal hunting and fishing. The island's remote location makes trafficking in illegal pelts difficult for would-be poachers.

Since statehood, the reported number of Kodiak bears killed by hunters has ranged from 77 (1968–1969) to 206 (1965–1966). From 2000 to 2006, an average of 173 Kodiak bears were killed by hunters each year (118 during the fall season and 55 in the spring season). Over 75% of those were males. An additional nine bears were reported killed annually in defense of life or property during the same time. The number of large, trophy-sized bears (total skull size at least 70 cm [28 inches]) killed by hunters in recent years has been increasing. In the 1970s, only 2.5% of the bears killed on Kodiak were trophy-sized; in the 1990s and 2000s, the proportion increased to almost 9%.

=== Bear-viewing ===
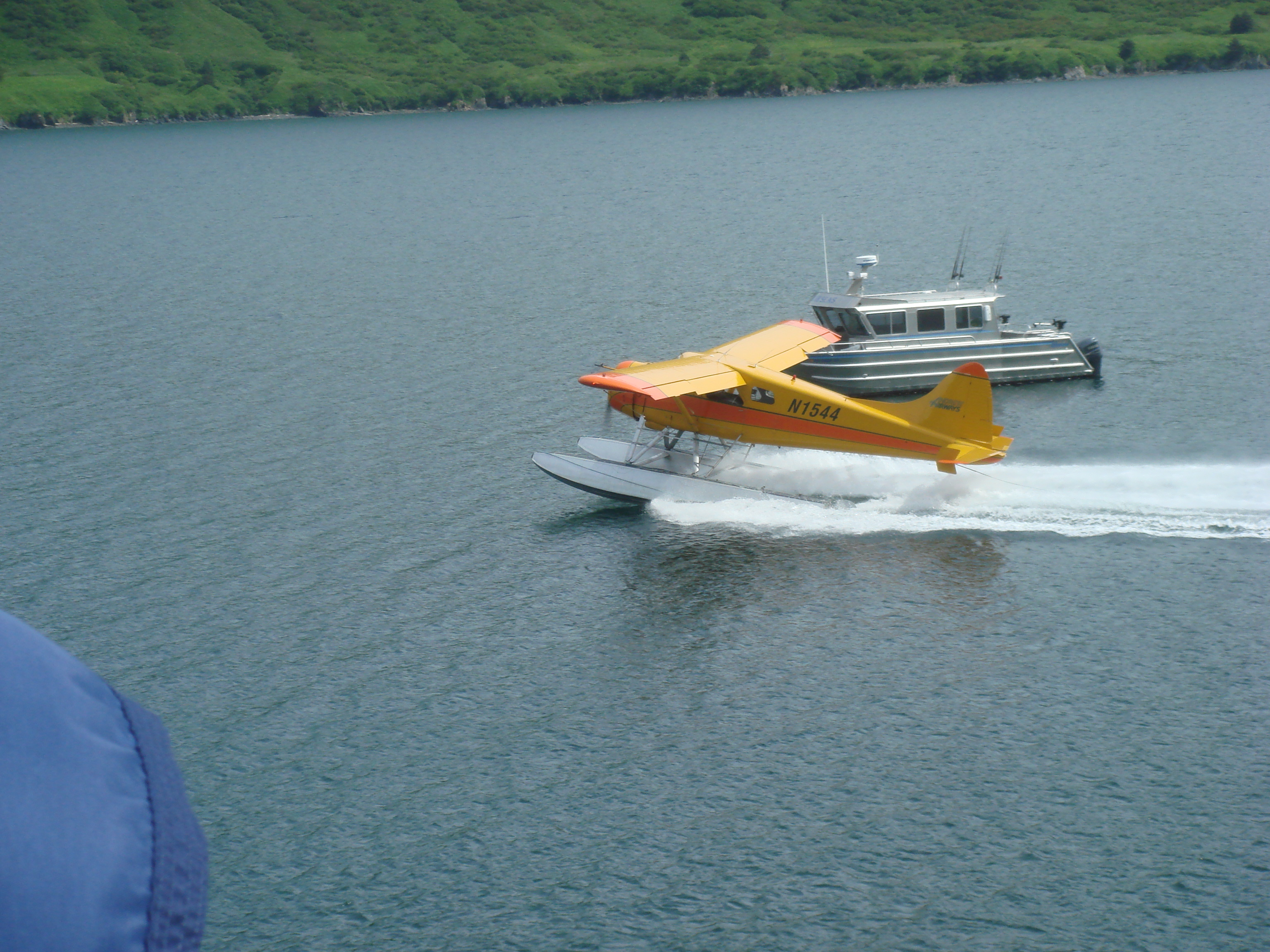
A float plane based in Kodiak takes guests from a wilderness lodge on Raspberry Island for a day of bear viewing.

In the past 20 years, bear viewing has become increasingly popular on Kodiak and other parts of Alaska. The most accessible bear-viewing location on Kodiak, Frazer River, had over 1,100 people come in 2007. Visitor numbers have been increasing at about 10% annually and development of additional bear viewing areas on Kodiak is planned. Also, other bear viewing opportunities exist through air-taxi, charter boat, remote lodge, and trekking operations on the archipelago. Although bear-viewing is often considered a "non-consumptive" use, it can have serious impacts on bear populations if it is not conducted properly. Most viewing occurs at places where bears congregate because of feeding opportunities that are critical to their survival. If some bears avoid these areas because people are there, those bears may not get the fat and protein they need to make it through the upcoming winter. Consequently, unmanaged bear viewing could affect several bears, especially productive sows with cubs. Often, bear-viewing and bear-hunting are considered incompatible. Even if the bear population is healthy and bear hunting is sustainable, ethical questions arise especially if hunting occurs near viewing areas and either during or soon after the viewing season. Many feel that it is not fair to encourage bears to be close to people during the summer, only to allow them to be shot in the fall. The Kodiak bear plan recognized bear hunting as a legitimate, traditional, and biologically justifiable activity. It recommended that agencies find ways to make bear hunting and bear viewing compatible on the archipelago.

== Cultural significance ==
The bear is important to the Alutiiq people. Its Alutiiq name is Taquka’aq (Bear), with the pronunciation varying between Northern and Southern dialects.
