= Ceremony (2010 film) =

- Theatrical release poster
- Directed by: Max Winkler
- Written by: Max Winkler
- Produced by: Emilio Diez Barroso; Darlene Caamaño Loquet; Polly Cohen Johnsen; Matt Spicer
- Starring: Michael Angarano; Uma Thurman; Reece Thompson; Lee Pace; Jake Johnson
- Cinematography: William Rexer
- Edited by: Joe Landauer
- Music by: Eric D. Johnson
- Production companies: NALA Films; Polymorphic Pictures
- Distributed by: Magnolia Pictures
- Release dates: September 13, 2010 (Toronto); April 8, 2011 (United States)
- Running time: 90 minutes
- Country: United States
- Language: English
- Box office: $22,270

Ceremony is a 2010 American film written and directed by Max Winkler, in his feature film directorial debut. The film stars Michael Angarano, Uma Thurman, Lee Pace, Rebecca Mader and Reece Thompson. It premiered at the 2010 Toronto International Film Festival in September 2010. The film was released on VOD on March 4, 2011, and opened in theaters April 8, 2011.

== Plot ==
Sam Davis (Michael Angarano) convinces his former best friend to spend a weekend with him to rekindle their friendship at an elegant beachside estate owned by a famous documentary filmmaker (Lee Pace). It soon becomes clear that Sam is secretly infatuated with the filmmaker's fiancée, Zoe (Uma Thurman), and that his true intention is to thwart their impending nuptials. As Sam's plan begins to unravel, he is forced to realize how complicated love and friendship can be.

== Cast ==
- Michael Angarano as Sam Davis
- Uma Thurman as Zoe
- Reece Thompson as Marshall Schmidt
- Lee Pace as Whit Coutell
- Jake Johnson as Teddy
- Rebecca Mader as Esme Ball

== Reception ==
As of July 2022, Ceremony holds a 39% approval rating on Rotten Tomatoes, based on 36 reviews with an average rating of 4.86/10.
