= Vivendi (disambiguation) =

Vivendi is a multinational French-based media conglomerate, formerly Compagnie Générale des Eaux.

Vivendi may also refer to:

- Veolia Environnement (previously Vivendi Environnement), former water and waste division of Vivendi
- Vivendi Entertainment, film, television and DVD distribution company
- Vivendi Games, former subsidiary of Vivendi S.A. and holdings company for Sierra Entertainment and Blizzard Entertainment
- Vivendi Universal Publishing, precursor of French publishing group Editis

== See also ==
- Modus vivendi, legal term
