= Polly Cohen Johnsen =

American film executive and producer

Polly Cohen Johnson
- Occupations: Film executive and producer
- Spouse: Robert Johnsen
- Children: 1

Polly Cohen Johnsen is an American film executive and producer. She went to college at the University of California at San Diego, where she majored in Chinese, and is also a graduate of the Peter Stark Producing Program at the University of Southern California.

== Career ==
Johnsen began her career working at Warner Bros. in the physical production department while in graduate school. She then became a story editor for producers Stacey Sher and Michael Shamberg at Jersey Films, where she worked on such projects as Gattaca. During her tenure at Jersey Films she teamed up with producer Roy Lee and Glen Gregory of Propaganda Films to create an online tracking board, where script readers could discuss the scripts they read. Online tracking boards have since become a useful tool throughout the film industry.

Johnsen re-joined Warner Bros. in 1997 as a creative executive and worked on such films as Three Kings, The Perfect Storm and Analyze This. She was promoted to production executive in 1998 and then to vice president, production in 1999. In 2003 she was named senior vice president, production and in 2006, executive vice president, production. As an executive, she was noted for recommending the first Harry Potter book for a potential film series, which became one of the studio's most successful franchises of all time. As a senior executive, she oversaw the Harry Potter films, Blood Diamond, I Am Legend, the Scooby-Doo series, and Superman Returns, among others.

Again in 2006, Johnsen was tapped by former Warner Bros. studio head Jeff Robinov to take over as president of production at Warner Independent Pictures. Among the films she oversaw at the arthouse division were The Painted Veil and Slumdog Millionaire. In 2008, The Hollywood Reporter recognized her on their Power 100 list, as one of the most influential women in Hollywood, and Glamour featured her in their editorial, "Success Secrets from the Women who Run Hollywood." Once Warner Independent Pictures closed in 2008, Johnsen agreed to a first-look producing deal with Warner Bros. under her banner, Polymorphic Pictures. She has since produced Cats & Dogs: The Revenge of Kitty Galore and Wrath of the Titans for the studio. She also produced Ceremony, written and directed by Max Winkler and starred Uma Thurman and Jake Johnson.

In 2013, Johnsen launched mytruestory.com, a website in which writers could share their true stories and Hollywood producers could read them in consideration for potential projects. Johnsen recently served as a panelist at the Shanghai Film Festival and also sits on the USC School of Cinematic Arts Alumni Board.

== Marriage and children ==
She is married to Robert Johnsen, co-founder of mywedding.com, with whom she has one child.

== Filmography ==
She was a producer in all films unless otherwise noted.

=== Film ===
Year	Film
2010	Cop Out
2010	Cats & Dogs: The Revenge of Kitty Galore
2010	Ceremony
2012	Wrath of the Titans

Miscellaneous crew

Year	Film	Role	Notes
1999	Three Kings	Studio executive	Uncredited
2000	The Perfect Storm	Studio executive	Uncredited
2001	Harry Potter and the Philosopher's Stone	Studio executive	Uncredited
2002	Scooby-Doo	Studio executive	Uncredited
2003	Gothika	Studio executive	Uncredited
2004	The Big Bounce	Studio executive	Uncredited
2004	Starsky & Hutch	Studio executive	Uncredited
2004	Scooby-Doo 2: Monsters Unleashed	Studio executive	Uncredited
2004	Harry Potter and the Prisoner of Azkaban	Studio executive	Uncredited
2004	Catwoman	Studio executive	Uncredited
2005	House of Wax	Studio executive	Uncredited
2005	Must Love Dogs	Studio executive	Uncredited
2006	Superman Returns	Studio executive	
2006	Blood Diamond	Studio executive	
2007	Clubland	Studio executive	
2007	Harry Potter and the Order of the Phoenix	Studio executive	Uncredited
2007	License to Wed	Studio executive	Uncredited
2007	Mama's Boy	Studio executive	Uncredited
2007	I Am Legend	Studio executive	Uncredited
2007	P.S. I Love You	Studio executive	Uncredited
2008	Slumdog Millionaire	Studio executive	Uncredited
2008	Yes Man	Studio executive	Uncredited
