= Shelter (2010 film) =

- Theatrical release poster
- Directed by: Måns Mårlind; Björn Stein
- Written by: Michael Cooney
- Produced by: Emilio Diez Barroso; Darlene Caamaño Loquet; Mike Macari; Neal Edelstein
- Starring: Julianne Moore; Jonathan Rhys Meyers; Jeffrey DeMunn; Frances Conroy; Nathan Corddry; Brooklynn Proulx
- Cinematography: Linus Sandgren
- Edited by: Steve Mirkovich
- Music by: John Frizzell
- Production companies: Shelter Entertainment; NALA Films; Macari/Edelstein
- Distributed by: RADiUS-TWC
- Release dates: 27 March 2010 (Japan); 1 March 2014 (United States)
- Running time: 112 minutes
- Country: United States
- Language: English
- Budget: $22 million
- Box office: $3.2 million

Shelter is a 2010 American supernatural horror thriller film co-directed by Swedish filmmakers Måns Mårlind and Björn Stein, written by British screenwriter Michael Cooney, and starring Julianne Moore and Jonathan Rhys Meyers. The film was released as 6 Souls in the United States on March 1, 2013, for video on demand, followed by a limited theatrical release on April 5, 2013. The film received negative reviews.

== Plot ==
As Dr. Cara Harding (Julianne Moore), a psychologist, and her husband walk home from church on Christmas Eve, he is attacked and killed by unknown suspects.

Trying to get her to return to the world, her father (Jeffrey DeMunn) introduces her to Adam (Jonathan Rhys Meyers), a patient suspected to have multiple personality disorder. The father hopes to convince her to accept unexplainable psychiatric theories. Adam takes on seemingly impossible physical characteristics of his other personalities.

Cara's father at first tells her about only one of Adam's personalities, David Burnberg. She learns that David, a personality who needs a wheelchair, was a real person who became a paraplegic and was murdered long ago. Cara visits David's mother and tells her about Adam. David's mother, who is highly religious, agrees to meet Adam to help Cara cure him. Adam, as David, reveals to Mrs. Burnberg details that are private to David. She tells Adam he is evil and leaves in distress.

Adam becomes more aggressive towards others, including Cara, and reveals more of his personalities. One of these is Wes, a metal band singer and Satanist suspected to have committed suicide. Thinking Adam created the personalities as escapism, Cara visits his home and finds it filthy, run-down, and full of devil worship objects. She also finds a decomposing body in the bathtub. After calling the police, Cara goes to pick up her daughter Sammy from school. Adam is with Sammy in the personality of a family friend. He questions Sammy about her faith in God, and Sammy says she does not believe anymore, because her dad was murdered. Adam is arrested and questioned about the body in his house.

Cara revisits Mrs. Bernburg, who directs Cara to a witch doctor known as 'Granny' in the witch mountains. After a brief meeting, Granny sends Cara away. Cara sneaks back after hearing screams and sees Granny cutting open an old man, sucking out his soul, and blowing it into a container with a strange symbol on it. Granny takes a cancerous lump out of his body and sews him up before blowing the soul back into him. The old man wakes up seemingly fine.

The witch doctor turns and asks Cara if she still believes only in science. Cara recalls that Adam asks about people's faiths when he meets them. She listens to two voice messages on her phone. One is from her brother, who is looking after Sammy. He tells Cara an old man may have answers for her relating to Adam.

Cara visits the man, who tells a story from his childhood while showing Cara a silent home video recorded by his father. Long ago a priest came to his town to teach about God, though he did not believe. The priest said witchcraft and pagan rituals were not needed and that people could be healed through faith. Influenza broke out in the town, but its people believed in the priest. When they discovered the priest was a nonbeliever who had inoculated his two daughters against the flu but allowed the townspeople to die, they murdered his daughters. Granny sucked out his soul and blew it into the air before stuffing his orifices with mud so his soul could not return. She cursed his body to be a shelter to the faithless.

The police tell Cara that they released 'Adam' to her father and that the body in his bathtub was the real Adam who had owned the home. Cara looks up at the projector screen and sees 'Adam' in the midst of the influenza epidemic. He is the faithless priest from decades ago. Cara calls her dad, realizing 'Adam' is going to kill him. She listens helplessly as the murder takes place, and Adam sucks out her father's soul.

Cara calls her brother about her discoveries. He tells her Sammy is growing sick just as her family friend and father had been, and has a strange symbol burnt onto her back. Cara asks him to take Sammy to Granny. 'Adam' shows up as Cara's father, but Stevie hides in the bathroom. Her brother is injured by accident. Cara tells Sammy to put the call on speaker not knowing it is her father's soul in possession and demands to speak to David. As 'Adam' transforms back into David, he collapses, as David needs a wheelchair. Cara's brother and daughter escape.

After joining them, Cara sees the symbol on Sammy is the same as the one on the witch doctor's container. Granny says she cannot help, as Sammy has already given up on God, but that Sammy will be sheltered with the other faithless souls. 'Adam' knocks out Cara's brother and overpowers Cara. He sucks out Sammy's soul and changes into her personality, revealing he does not have DID, but is the shelter for the spirits of people who abandoned their faith in God.

'Adam' as Sammy lets Cara cradle him. She strangles him and impales his neck with a root protruding from the ground. As the faithless priest 'Adam' dies, all the souls leave his body.

Sammy's lifeless body receives her soul back. As Cara and Sammy comfort each other, Sammy hums a tune written by David, implying David's soul has gone into her body.

== Cast ==
- Julianne Moore as Cara Harding-Jessup
- Jonathan Rhys Meyers as Reverend Christian Moore/Adam Sabre/David Bernberg/Wesley Crite
- Jeffrey DeMunn as Dr. Harding
- Frances Conroy as Dita Bernburg
- Nathan Corddry as Stephen Harding
- Brooklynn Proulx as Sammy Jessup
- Brian Anthony Wilson as Virgil
- Joyce Feurring as Granny Holler Witch
- KatiAna Davis as The Familiar
- Michael Graves as Holler Man
- Rick Applegate as Warden Collins
- Jules Sylvester as Snake Milker
- Jim Brough as Holler Man
- Jeffrey Jones as Police Officer
- Matthew Bok as Man in Parking Lot (uncredited)

== Production ==
Much of the film was shot in various locations across the Pittsburgh, PA region. Locations used include: Downtown Pittsburgh and its bridges, the Fort Pitt Tunnel, East Liberty Presbyterian Church, Jones Hall at Community College of Allegheny County, Ritter's Diner near Shadyside, Spin Bartini & Ultra Lounge in Shadyside, various locations in Braddock including the Braddock Carnegie Library and home of Mayor John Fetterman, a residence in the city's Schenley Farms neighborhood, the Collier maintenance yard, and a recreated 17th century Native American village at the Meadowcroft Rockshelter. Peter Martorano, the film's location manager, worked with the Pittsburgh Film Office.

== Release ==
The United Kingdom release was set with a cinema release on April 9, 2010. While an American release was planned for February 25, 2011, it was later shelved. The film was eventually released on March 1, 2013, for VOD, and April 5 for a limited theatrical run, and was re-titled to 6 Souls.

== Reception ==
The film has been met with primarily negative reviews. On Rotten Tomatoes, the film holds a 7% approval rating, based on 28 reviews. Mike Sheridan from Entertainment.ie gave the film two stars out of five stating Shelter is "A thriller desperately trying to throw the audience off at every corner, just as writer Michael Cooney's previous screenplay effort Identity did to mostly stellar effect, Shelter is instead a whole lot of stupid wrapped in moody packaging." Mark Harrison from Den of Geek gave a more positive review, calling it "horror by numbers, but it's at least sparing with whatever felt tip pen denotes 'jump scares'". Faith-based Movieguide called the film "extremely well acted" and stated that it "provides a more intelligent tale than the genre usually offers" when comparing it with other horror videos.

== See also ==
- Dissociative identity disorder
- Split, a 2016 film by M. Night Shyamalan
