= NALA Films =

Film production and financing company

- Company type: Private
- Industry: Motion pictures
- Founded: 2005
- Founder: Emilio Diez Barroso
- Headquarters: West Hollywood, Los Angeles, U.S.
- Website: nalafilms.com

NALA Films is a film production and financing company, the production arm of NALA Investments, LLC. It was founded in 2005 by Mexican-American businessman Emilio Diez Barroso.

== Foundation ==
NALA (North America Latin America) Films, LLC was founded in 2005 by Emilio Diez Barroso (the great-grandson Televisa founder Emilio Azcárraga Vidaurreta), as the production arm of NALA Investments (founded in 1999), an investment vehicle with a portfolio of holdings across various industries. NALA Films, which is headquartered just off Santa Monica Boulevard in West Hollywood, Los Angeles, is a "film development, production and financing company that NALA Films is a financing and production company that focuses on making quality, character-driven projects for film, television and new media. The company "produces and finances three to five feature films per year".

=== Key people ===
Under CEO Diez Barroso, Darlene Caamaño-Loquet is President of NALA Films, a role which saw her named the sixth most powerful Hispanic woman on the Hispanic Women "Power 25" list of 2007. As President, Caamaño Loquet develops, supervises and produces the financing/production company's feature film and television slate. In 2007, it was reported that the executive ranks had been expanded by the double hiring of Corrie Rothbart as Chief Financial Officer, and Rudy Scalese as Director of Development. Rothbart, whose previous roles included positions with ICM Partners, Gold Circle Films and Sony Pictures Entertainment, took on the role of overseer on "financial and strategic planning, corporate treasury, business development, production finance, accounting and operations." Scalese's role new role was to "help identify and develop material to fulfill the company's production slate of four to five relatively big-budget films per year, as well as its lower-budget genre fare," after he came to prominence producing the documentary: Going to Pieces: The Rise and Fall of the Slasher Film. Scalese had also previously worked for Caamaño-Loquet's D-No Entertainment.

== Films ==
Diez Barroso and NALA financed their first film, The Air I Breathe, with money raised from private investors, "state subsidies" and "film subsidy programs" such as the fund run by the Mexico film institute Imcine. In addition, NALA took "a relatively conservative tack by shooting most pics in Mexico," where it "has fostered relationships with local state authorities." Diez Barroso, Caamaño-Loquet and Paul Schiff, who brought the production to NALA, produced, in association with Paul Schiff Productions, (whose Tai Duncan co-executive produced with Christopher Pratt).

NALA Films attempt to produce works with Latin American talent "to finance three to four English-language [films] per year in the $6 million to $30 million range." Ultimately, the first film to be released (in association with Warner Bros.) was the Oscar-nominated In the Valley of Elah (2007), starring Tommy Lee Jones and Charlize Theron. Dan in Real Life (which Caamaño-Loquet developed earlier with Noah Rosen and their D-No Entertainment) followed the same year, in association with Buena Vista. ThinkFilm released The Air I Breathe at various film festivals throughout late 2007, which then debuted in the United States on limited release in January 2008. After Sex (2007), starring Jane Seymour, followed a similar pattern.

As of April 2015, NALA Productions has been the major/sole production company behind eight films. They are:

- The Air I Breathe (2007) starring Forest Whitaker, Andy García, Sarah Michelle Gellar, Kevin Bacon, Brendan Fraser, Emile Hirsch, and Julie Delpy
- After Sex (2007) starring Jane Seymour, Mila Kunis, Taryn Manning, and Zoe Saldaña
- In the Valley of Elah (2007) starring Charlize Theron, Tommy Lee Jones, Susan Sarandon, James Franco, and Jason Patrik, written and directed by Paul Haggis
- Shelter (2010) starring Julianne Moore, Jonathan Rhys Meyers, Jeffrey DeMunn, Frances Conroy, and Nate Corddry
- Ceremony (2010) starring Michael Angarano, Uma Thurman, Reece Thompson, Lee Pace, and Jake Johnson
- Decoding Deepak (2012) starring Deepak Chopra and Gotham Chopra, written and directed by Gotham Chopra
- Casa de Mi Padre (2012) starring Will Ferrell, Diego Luna, Gael García Bernal, and Nick Offerman
- The Bling Ring (2013) starring Katie Chang, Emma Watson, Taissa Farmiga, Israel Broussard and Leslie Mann, written and directed by Sofia Coppola

== Partnerships ==
In November 2006, it was announced that NALA Films had formed a partnership with the William Morris Agency, who will "provide consulting services on a slate of at least five films," to which NALA will bring production funds of "$125 million... over the next two to three years." The Agency, who also acts as consultant to Bob Yari's financing company El Camino and the Pelican Film and Beverly Bridge Funds, "will help NALA consider possible feature packages for funding." NALA President Darlene Caamaño-Loquet noted that the Los Angeles-based company "plans to fully finance its projects and does not intend to seek partners," while also "continu[ing] to produce projects outside of its WMA partnership." (NALA did, however, partner with both Summit Entertainment, on whose board of directors Diez Barroso sits, and Steve Samuels Media Capital to finance and produce In the Valley of Elah.)
