= The Air I Breathe =

2007 American crime drama film

- Theatrical poster
- Directed by: Jieho Lee
- Written by: Jieho Lee; Bob DeRosa
- Produced by: Darlene Caamaño; Emilio Diez Barroso; Paul Schiff
- Starring: Kevin Bacon; Julie Delpy; Brendan Fraser; Andy García; Sarah Michelle Gellar; Emile Hirsch; Forest Whitaker
- Cinematography: Walt Lloyd
- Music by: Marcelo Zarvos
- Distributed by: THINKFilm
- Release dates: April 29, 2007 (Tribeca); January 25, 2008 (United States)
- Running time: 95 minutes
- Country: United States
- Language: English
- Box office: $2.6 million

The Air I Breathe is a 2007 crime drama film and the directorial debut of Korean-American filmmaker Jieho Lee, who co-wrote the script with Bob DeRosa. The film stars Kevin Bacon, Julie Delpy, Brendan Fraser, Andy Garcia, Sarah Michelle Gellar, Emile Hirsch, and Forest Whitaker.

The concept of the film is based on an ancient Chinese proverb that breaks life down into four emotional cornerstones – Happiness (Whitaker), Pleasure (Fraser), Sorrow (Gellar), and Love (Bacon). The proverb speaks of these emotions, not as isolated fragments of feelings, but as elements that make up the whole of human existence. Each of the four protagonists is based on one of the four emotions; and like the proverb their paths are inextricably linked to each other, akin to the Fingers (Garcia) of a hand. None of the four main characters' actual names are mentioned in the whole film, although Gellar's character's stage name, "Trista", is mentioned several times.

The Air I Breathe was financed by NALA Investments through its production company NALA Films, and was released on January 25, 2008, in the United States. The film received mainly negative reviews from critics, but some of the cast's performances were praised with Gellar, Garcia, and Whitaker being singled out.

== Plot ==
Each of the elements of life is portrayed using four different people on the urban streets of Los Angeles, with Fingers (Garcia), a gangster, playing the part that intertwines all four individuals.

Happiness

Forest Whitaker plays a meek bank employee who loves butterflies. He accidentally overhears acquaintances discussing a fixed horse race, and decides to bet $50,000, borrowing from a bookie. Unfortunately, he loses the bet.

The bookie, Fingers, derives his name from his habit of cutting off the fingers of those who don't pay back their debts. Fingers threatens the bank employee while Fingers' mob enforcer visits him to collect. The mob enforcer pities the bank employee, gives him a revolver and leaves. In desperation, the bank employee robs his own bank. While fleeing, he is slightly hit by a moving vehicle, and then escapes to the top of a building. Surrounded, the police order the bank employee to drop his gun. He does not comply, throwing the money bag off the roof, and is killed by the police. When he hits the ground, his coat is spread out making him look like a butterfly.

Pleasure

Brendan Fraser plays the mob enforcer who has a tragic past and an ability to see the future of the people he meets, an ability that deprives him of the pleasure of enjoying the surprises in life. When he was young, the mob enforcer was forced to defend his younger brother in a street fight against two teenagers. The mob enforcer won the fight but found his brother lying dead. The mob enforcer often has flashbacks of this scene throughout the film. Later in life, the mob enforcer joins Fingers' gang and becomes one of his favorites due mostly to his ability. He, however, cannot see the future of Trista, a somewhat morose up-and-coming pop singer/dancer.

The mob enforcer is assigned to look after Fingers' visiting nephew Tony. He has a vision of Tony climbing a fence and falling back. To avoid trouble, he leaves Tony in a club while working (collecting protection money). Unfortunately, one of the girls that Tony is with, high on drugs, staggers into the next room. When Tony follows her, they struggle over a gun, and an older mobster gets shot. The mob enforcer rescues Tony, and they run from the henchmen, ending at the fence of the earlier vision. Tony gets away, and it is the mob enforcer who is caught by the henchmen, severely beaten, and then treated by Dr. Love (Bacon) at a hospital.

Sorrow

Sarah Michelle Gellar plays the pop singer/dancer whose stage name is Trista. In flashback, it's revealed that as a young child, she saw her father killed when he was accidentally hit by a moving car, immediately after promising to 'be there for her', and the loss affects her deeply. Trista's manager is deeply indebted to Fingers and embezzles Trista's money to pay Fingers, but that is not enough, so he assigns Trista's contract to Fingers. Trista, incensed, escapes from Fingers and meets Pleasure. Fingers, naturally, has already ordered his team to find her. Pleasure, sympathetic to her, helps Trista by letting her stay with him, knowing that his house is the only place Fingers wouldn't search for her. They become lovers, but soon Fingers finds out about her location, and kills Pleasure, causing Trista even more sorrow. Her blood type is Kp(a-b-), which she reveals when a TV interviewer (Jon Bernthal) asks her what is special about her. This becomes hopeful information when Love hears it on the television, as he is searching for that blood type, the same as Gina's, when he is trying to save her life.

Love

Kevin Bacon plays Dr. Love, who is in a relationship with his longtime friend Gina (Julie Delpy). He never confessed his love and, so, she married his best friend. Gina gets bitten by a venomous snake and needs a rare type of blood. Desperate, Dr. Love races to the location where Trista is filming the interview; however, Trista's assistant is in the process of trying to help Trista run away. Dr. Love runs to Trista. Her bodyguards, thinking he is a crazed fan, grab him while Trista is accidentally knocked down, hits her head, and ends up in the hospital. When she awakens, Fingers informs her that she will have to abort the baby that she has just become aware that she is carrying. In her sorrow that the baby, the one thing she has left of the man she loved will be lost, she sneaks out of her room and goes to the roof to jump off and commit suicide. Dr. Love, by circumstance, sees her and races up in time to see her step off the ledge. Dr. Love grabs the bed sheet that she had wrapped around her like a cape and catches her. He tells her she will have to come up and grab his hand for him to be able to pull her up. After she does this, the movie flashes to Gina, saved, awakening from her coma. Dr. Love loans Trista his car as a gift for saving Gina and she leaves the hospital.

Ending

Fingers looks for Trista at the hospital, but his efforts to find her are in vain, as she has already left. As Trista escapes in Love's car, she slightly hits Happiness as he runs in front of her car in his dash from the bank (in the scene that we saw from his point of view earlier); as she sits at the intersection, as she's coming to grips with all that has happened, the money bag Happiness threw from the top of the building lands on her car's rooftop. The film closes with Trista at an airport traveling away, the money bag providing her with all the financial support she needs to escape from Fingers and start a new life for herself and her baby abroad.

== Cast ==
- Kevin Bacon as Doctor / Love
- Julie Delpy as Gina
- Brendan Fraser as Pleasure
  - Jason Dolley as Young Pleasure
- Andy García as Fingers
- Sarah Michelle Gellar as Trista / Sorrow
  - Sasha Pieterse as Young Sorrow
- Clark Gregg as Henry
- Emile Hirsch as Tony
- Forest Whitaker as Happiness
- Kelly Hu as Jiyoung
- Evan Parke as Danny
- Taylor Nichols as Trista's Father
- Victor Rivers as Eddie
- Cecilia Suárez as Alison
- Todd Stashwick as Frank
- Jon Bernthal as Interviewer
- Will Maier as Mr. Parks
- John Cho as Bart
- Kari Wührer as Correspondent

== Production ==
Jieho Lee wrote the script for The Air I Breathe in 2003. He later sent it to several producers, including Lawrence Bender and John Woo, and eventually teamed up with Paul Schiff.

Schiff brought the film to Emilio Diez Barroso (the chairman of NALA Investments and founder of NALA Films), who financed it with money raised from private investors, "state subsidies" and "film subsidy programs" such as the fund run by the Mexico film institute Imcine. Diez Barroso, Caamaño-Loquet, and Schiff served as producers, in association with Paul Schiff Productions (whose Tai Duncan co-executive produced with Christopher Pratt).

The casting process took Lee about two years to complete. In an April 2008 interview, he stated: "I was lucky but also very prepared. I drew storyboards, had my musical inspiration and did research on every single actor I'd met down to their dog's name […] It was a difficult, lonely process. I thought I was going crazy and wondered what I was doing with my life. But we had people who believed in it". For instance, Sarah Michelle Gellar, who described it as "one of the most beautiful and different scripts that I ever read", was the first actor to be cast after having been "following that script for a couple of years". Given the film's limited budget, the director, cinematographer and executive producer all appeared as minor characters.

Filmed in Mexico City, The Air I Breathe had a 29-day shoot and over 50 location changes. Lee described the filming as "madness", and said: "We were running everywhere. It was so crazy. I think I got sick because I didn't sleep at all".

== Reception ==
=== Box office ===
In the United States, The Air I Breathe had a one-week limited release run in seven theatres, where it made $25,775. Worldwide, the film grossed $2.6 million.

=== Critical response ===
Reviews for the film were overwhelmingly negative. Review aggregator website Rotten Tomatoes gave it an approval rating of 10% based on 40 reviews, with an average rating of 3.83/10. The site's consensus reads "The Air I Breathe is a jumbled indie production that accomplishes little save for the squandering of a talented cast". On Metacritic, the film has a score of 37 out of 100, based on 9 critics, indicating "generally unfavorable reviews". Most critics agreed that while the cast gave good performances, the film itself is overly pretentious to the point of comedy.

Entertainment Weekly critic Lisa Schwarzbaum gave the film a "D−" and called it an "unintentional parody". Claudia Puig of USA Today conceded that each of the film's segments "has its moments" but that on the whole it lacked "an overarching vision". In the New York Daily News, Jack Mathews thought the film had a "convoluted screenplay" that went "0-4" on its segments, despite the "fine" performances from the cast. Carina Chocano agreed that the cast was of a "high-caliber" and "disport[ed] themselves admirably" in the Los Angeles Times, with special mention to Andy Garcia and Forest Whitaker, but ultimately felt that "the whole thing looks like a pirated knockoff" with "all the aesthetic innovation of a disposable razor commercial", showcasing "meaningless allegory, violence and pretension" that gets "more ludicrous by the minute" and is "good for an occasional laugh". Annabelle Robertson from Crosswalk also praised the cast, particularly for Forest Whitaker and Sarah Michelle Gellar, but criticized it as an "off-kilter copycat of Crash with lesser production values". Writing for Variety, Ronnie Scheib also agreed that the cast was "stellar" but deemed the film to be "morosely pretentious" and questioned who it was for as it "strains both credulity and patience".

== Home media ==
The film was released on DVD and Blu-ray Disc on May 27, 2008, in the United States and includes a commentary, featurette, trailer and deleted scenes. It was released on DVD in the UK on September 15, 2008.
