= Neal Edelstein =

American film producer

- Edelstein on set, c. 2013
- Born: Winnetka, Illinois
- Occupation: Film producer
- Known for: The Straight Story; Mulholland Drive

Neal Edelstein is an American independent film producer. He produced David Lynch's films The Straight Story and Mulholland Drive, and was a co-executive producer on the horror film The Ring and its sequels.

== Biography ==
=== Early life ===
Neal Edelstein was born in Winnetka, Illinois, United States. He graduated from the New Trier High School.

=== Career ===
Edelstein began his film career in Los Angeles, California in the early 1990s. In 1995, he produced "Premonitions Following an Evil Deed", David Lynch's segment in the French film Lumière and Company, shot with the original Lumiere brothers's camera. After completion of the film, Edelstein and Lynch became partners in The Picture Factory, where Edelstein produced The Straight Story and Mulholland Drive, as well as worked with Lynch to conceive and launch the website DavidLynch.com.

Later, Edelstein formed Macari/Edelstein Filmed Entertainment with New Line Cinema executive Mike Macari. Their first project together was the American remake of the Japanese horror film The Ring, followed by the sequel The Ring Two. Edelstein was instrumental in creating the viral marketing campaign for The Ring with director Gore Verbinski. Other film credits include Disney-distributed The Invisible, directed by David S. Goyer, and Shelter, starring Julianne Moore and Jonathan Rhys Meyers.

Additionally, Edelstein is the founder of Hooked Digital Media, a production company that delivers filmed stories for the mobile and tablet generation. In 2013 they released Haunting Melissa, a storytelling iOS app that rolls out new chapters and content of varying duration.

== Filmography ==
Edelstein was a producer in all films unless otherwise noted.

=== Film ===
| Year | Film | Credit |
|---|---|---|
| 1995 | Lumière and Company | Segment "Premonitions Following an Evil Deed" (dir. David Lynch) |
| 1999 | The Straight Story | |
| 2001 | Mulholland Drive | |
| 2002 | The Ring | Co-executive producer |
| 2005 | The Ring Two | Co-executive producer |
| 2007 | The Invisible | |
| 2008 | Amusement | |
| 2010 | Shelter | |
| 2014 | Dark Hearts | |
| 2017 | Rings | Executive producer |
| 2017 | Temple | |
| 2019 | Fractured | |
| 2022 | Night's End | |
| 2023 | Southern Gospel | |
| TBA | Hairstyles of the Damned | |
| TBA | Kung Fu High School | |

As director

| Year | Film |
|---|---|
| 2013 | Haunting Melissa |
| 2014 | Dark Hearts |

As writer

| Year | Film |
|---|---|
| 2017 | Temple |

Thanks

| Year | Film | Role |
|---|---|---|
| 2011 | Untitled | Special thanks |

=== Television ===
| Year | Title | Notes |
|---|---|---|
| 1999 | Mulholland Drive | Television pilot |
| 2013 | Haunting Melissa | |
