= Warner Independent Pictures =

American independent film division of Warner Bros

- Type: Division
- Industry: Film
- Founded: August 7, 2003; 23 years ago
- Founder: Mark Gill
- Defunct: November 12, 2008; 18 years ago
- Fate: Closed
- Successor: Warner Bros. Clockwork
- Headquarters: Burbank, California, United States
- Parent: Time Warner

Warner Independent Pictures was an independent film division of the American film studio Warner Bros.. Established on August 7, 2003, its first release was 2004's Before Sunset, the sequel to the 1995 film Before Sunrise. The division financed, produced, acquired and distributed feature films largely budgeted under $20 million. The division closed on November 12, 2008.

== History ==
Warner Independent Pictures was established on August 7, 2003, at Burbank, California. Mark Gill was the division's first president. After a controversial departure, Gill was replaced by former Warner Bros. production executive Polly Cohen, who served as president of this division until fall 2008, when the division was officially shut down. While well versed in big-budget motion picture production, it was widely believed Cohen did not have strong enough backgrounds in independent film, or in the marketing/publicity aspects of film distribution, to hold that role. This led to a lackluster slate and output, after a successful initial run under Gill.

In February 2008, Time Warner announced that it would merge New Line Cinema into Warner Bros. New Line's "independent" group Picturehouse was expected to be merged into Warner Independent as part of this process. On May 8, 2008, however, it was announced that both of these specialty divisions would be shut down.

In 2013, Picturehouse was relaunched under separate ownership.

In December 2025, Warner Bros. would re-enter the independent filmmaking space, with former Neon executives Christian Parkes, Jason Wald, and Spencer Collantes spearheading the creation of a new specialty label within the studio. At the 2026 CinemaCon in April 2026, the label's name was revealed to be Warner Bros. Clockwork, with Sean Baker's Ti Amo! announced as its maiden release.

== Films ==
Title	Release date	Notes
Before Sunset	July 2, 2004	co-production with Castle Rock Entertainment; international distribution by Warner Bros. Pictures
A Home at the End of the World	July 23, 2004	co-production with Hart-Sharp Entertainment
We Don't Live Here Anymore (Note: Currently owned by Samuel Goldwyn Films)	August 13, 2004	North American distribution only; produced by Front Street Pictures
Criminal	September 10, 2004	
Around the Bend	October 8, 2004	
A Very Long Engagement	December 17, 2004	North American distribution only; distributed internationally by Warner Bros. Pictures
The Jacket	March 4, 2005	North American, U.K., Irish, South African and Filipino distribution only; co-production with Mandalay Pictures and 2929 Entertainment
Eros	April 8, 2005	North American distribution only
March of the Penguins	July 22, 2005	multiple award winner, including an Academy Award for Best Documentary Feature; U.S., U.K. and Irish distribution with National Geographic Films only; produced by Wild Bunch and Bonne Pioche
Everything Is Illuminated	September 16, 2005	co-production with Big Beach
Good Night, and Good Luck	October 14, 2005	multiple Academy Award nominations, including Best Picture; U.S. distribution only; produced by 2929 Entertainment, Participant Productions and Section Eight
Paradise Now	October 28, 2005	Golden Globe Award for Best Foreign Language Film nominated for the Academy Award for Best Foreign Language Film; North American, U.K. and Irish distribution only
Looking for Comedy in the Muslim World	January 20, 2006	North American distribution only; produced by Shangri-La Entertainment
Duck Season	March 10, 2006	North American co-distribution with Esperanto Filmoj only
The Promise	May 5, 2006	North American distribution only; also distributed in Germany and Austria by Warner Bros. Pictures
A Scanner Darkly	July 7, 2006	co-production with Thousand Words and Section Eight
The Science of Sleep	September 22, 2006	North American, U.K. and Irish distribution only; produced by Gaumont, France 3 Cinéma and Canal+
Infamous	October 13, 2006	North American, U.K. and Irish distribution only
For Your Consideration	November 22, 2006	North American, U.K. and Irish distribution only; produced by Castle Rock Entertainment and Shangri-La Entertainment
The Painted Veil	January 19, 2007	North American distribution only; co-production with Bob Yari Productions and The Mark Gordon Company
The Astronaut Farmer	February 23, 2007	original distributor; ultimately distributed by Warner Bros. Pictures; produced by Polish Brothers Construction and Spring Creek Pictures
In the Land of Women	April 20, 2007	original distributor; ultimately distributed by Warner Bros. Pictures; produced by Castle Rock Entertainment and Anonymous Content
Introducing the Dwights	August 3, 2007	North American, U.K., Irish, German and Austrian distribution only; known as Clubland in Australia
The 11th Hour	August 17, 2007	distribution only
December Boys (Note: Co-owned by Alcon Entertainment)	September 14, 2007	distribution outside Australia and New Zealand only; produced by Village Roadshow Pictures and Film Finance Corporation Australia
In the Valley of Elah	September 28, 2007	North American distribution only; co-production with Summit Entertainment, NALA Films, Samuels Media and Blackfriars Bridge; also distributed in France by Warner Bros. Pictures
Rails & Ties	October 26, 2007	original distributor; ultimately distributed by Warner Bros. Pictures; produced by Malpaso Productions
Darfur Now	November 2, 2007	co-production with Participant Productions
Mama's Boy	December 21, 2007	original distributor; ultimately distributed by Warner Bros. Pictures; produced by Carr/Santelli Productions
Snow Angels	March 7, 2008	distribution outside Latin America, Spain and select other territories only; produced by Crossroads Films
Funny Games	March 14, 2008	U.S. and Spanish distribution only; co-production with Tartan Films, Celluloid Dreams and FilmFour
Chaos Theory	April 11, 2008	original distributor; ultimately distributed by Warner Bros. Pictures; produced by Castle Rock Entertainment and Lone Star Film Group
Towelhead	September 26, 2008	North American and Russian distribution with Red Envelope Entertainment (uncredited) only; produced by Indian Paintbrush, This is that Corporation and Your Face Goes Here Productions
Slumdog Millionaire	November 12, 2008	multiple award winner, including an Academy Award for Best Picture original distributor; ultimately distributed by Warner Bros. Pictures and Fox Searchlight Pictures; produced by Pathé, Celador Films and FilmFour
