= Marilyn Horowitz =

American screenwriter

Marilyn Horowitz (born 1957) is an American writer, TV creator, script doctor, writing coach, and producer. She is also the creator of the Horowitz System, a system for screenwriting, and author of several books.

== Early years ==
Horowitz was born in 1957 and raised in Manhattan, New York City. She is the daughter of David H. Horowitz, former General Counsel for Columbia Pictures. Her mother, Louise S. Horowitz, was a professor of philosophy.

Horowitz attended Louis D. Brandeis High School in New York City. She received a B.A. from NYU’s Tisch School of the Arts, where she made a short film Night Hawks At the Diner, the story of a hit man who buys a cup of coffee for an old woman after committing a vicious murder. It was screened on Showtime. She is the cousin of actor Richard Schiff, producer Paul Schiff, and David Schiff, Founder and CEO of MGMT Entertainment.

== Career ==
In 1996, Horowitz co-founded ArtMar Productions, a screenwriting consulting and education company.

Horowitz was the script consultant and associate producer on 2004’s The Reawakening, an independent feature film produced under the auspices of the ABC New Talent Development Scholarship Grant and the script consultant for the 2007 Warner Bros. film, And Then Came Love, starring Vanessa Williams.

In 2004, she won the New York University Award for Teaching Excellence.

In June 2017, along with writing partner and animator David Manstream, she formed Double Asterix Productions, LLC, a creative writing company specializing in creating and developing half hour animated comedies for television.

In January 2025, Horowitz was a guest on the Off the Shelf Podcast.

== Written works ==
Horowitz is an Adjunct Assistant Professor at the New York University. She has written six books teaching her method. Two of her books, The Four Magic Questions of Screenwriting (ISBN 978-0-9799089-4-1) and How to Write a Screenplay in 10 Weeks (ISBN 978-0-9799089-1-0), have been required NYU textbooks.

Horowitz has contributed articles to Screenwriter, Hollywood Scriptwriter and Script Magazine. Horowitz’s writing appears in Now Write! Screenwriting: Screenwriting Exercises from Today's Best Writers and Teachers by Sherry Ellis and Laurie Lamson , a screenwriting exercise anthology published by Tarcher Penguin on January 6, 2011.
