= Gaiam Vivendi Entertainment =

Film, television, DVD and digital distribution company

- Type: Division
- Industry: Entertainment
- Founded: 2004; 22 years ago
- Defunct: 2013; 13 years ago
- Fate: Folded into New Video
- Successor: New Video
- Headquarters: 111 Universal Hollywood Drive, Suite 400, Universal City, California 91608, United States
- Products: Motion pictures, television programs
- Parent: Universal Music Group Distribution (2004–2012); Vivendi (2004–2013); Gaiam (2012–2013); New Video (2013)
- Website: cinedigm.com

Gaiam Vivendi Entertainment (formerly known as Vivendi Entertainment, Vivendi Visual Entertainment and Visual Entertainment) was a film, television, DVD and digital distribution company that operated in the United States and Canada. It was also a distribution partner for independent content providers.

== History ==
Visual Entertainment was founded as a home media subsidiary of Universal Music Group Distribution in 2004. In 2006, Visual Entertainment was renamed Vivendi Visual Entertainment. In 2008, Vivendi Entertainment expanded from home video into theatrical distribution.

In 2009, Vivendi Entertainment acquired much of the library of defunct distributor Genius Products.

In April 2012, UMG sold Vivendi Entertainment to Gaiam and merged with its home entertainment division, renaming the combined subsidiary Gaiam Vivendi Entertainment.

In October 2013, Cinedigm acquired Gaiam Vivendi Entertainment for $51.5 million. Cinedigm merged Gaiam Vivendi Entertainment into their existing home video business, New Video.

== Services ==
The company has provided sales, marketing, and distribution services to studios such as The Weinstein Company, World Wrestling Entertainment, The Jim Henson Company, Salient Media, NFL Films, Shout! Factory, GoodTimes Entertainment, ARC Entertainment LLC, Classic Media, Hallmark Channel, Indomina Releasing, Nasser Entertainment, Event Film, RHI Entertainment, Polychrome Pictures, Sid and Marty Krofft, Eagle Rock Entertainment, Blowtorch Entertainment, Mill Creek Entertainment, DHX Media, Saban Brands, Saban Entertainment, Palisades Tartan, Palm Pictures, Nelvana, Razor & Tie, Dargaud Media, Pure Flix Entertainment, Codeblack Entertainment, Melee Entertainment, A&E Home Entertainment, which included A&E, History Channel, and Lifetime Dimension Extreme and Genius Products.

The company has partnered with DHX Media by creating free episodes, "special collections", and "discounted seasons" for fans of the Inspector Gadget franchise in the US.

In September 2013, the company released Secret Millionaires Club: Volume 2 on DVD.
