= Tenure (film) =

- Theatrical release poster
- Directed by: Mike Million
- Written by: Mike Million
- Produced by: Jared Ian Goldman; Paul Schiff; Tai Duncan; Brendan McDonald; Blowtorch Entertainment
- Starring: Luke Wilson; David Koechner; Gretchen Mol
- Cinematography: Steve Yedlin
- Edited by: Tom McArdle
- Music by: John Frizzell
- Distributed by: Blowtorch Entertainment
- Release dates: October 2009 (Hamptons Film Festival); February 19, 2010 (United States)
- Running time: 89 minutes
- Country: United States
- Language: English
- Budget: $5 million

Tenure is a 2009 American comedy-drama film written and directed by Mike Million and starring Luke Wilson, David Koechner and Gretchen Mol. The film was produced by Paul Schiff and released by Blowtorch Entertainment as their first original production.

After being screened at several film festivals and independent theaters, Tenure was first released on DVD exclusively at Blockbuster Video stores on February 19, 2010. A national release followed in April 2010.

== Plot ==
Charlie Thurber (Luke Wilson) is a beleaguered English professor at fictional Grey College (a liberal arts college in Pennsylvania) who competes for tenure against an impressive new hire from Yale, Elaine Grasso (Gretchen Mol). Jay Hadley (David Koechner) is an anthropology professor at Grey who tries to convince Thurber to sabotage Grasso's career – while being simultaneously obsessed with trying to prove the authenticity of Bigfoot. Thurber's articles are rejected by a series of academic journals and he worries about becoming a victim of the "publish or perish" pressures of professorship. Despite competing for the same job, Thurber and Grasso begin developing a friendship after she flounders as a classroom teacher and asks him for advice.

Meanwhile, Thurber struggles with a series of personal problems: his sister, Margarette (Sasha Alexander), pesters him for money to pay for the retirement home of their father, William (Bob Gunton); a smitten female student, Blaire, is pressingly flirtatious; and rather than admit he's single, Thurber hires Beth (Rosemarie DeWitt), a woman of questionable sanity, to act as his girlfriend for a dinner with Grasso and her snobbish boyfriend Warren (Andrew Daly).

Thurber's tenure review with college officials seems to heading for a disaster until the dean casts a tie-breaking vote, noting that Thurber's students gave him exemplary reviews and clearly adore him. Thurber is offered probational tenure, with the caveat that his classroom teaching will be severely reduced so that he can devote more time to publishing in respectable academic outlets.

The film concludes with Thurber inviting his ailing father to move in with him and throwing a party at his home, where he learns that Grasso has broken up with her boyfriend, hinting that she would like to pursue a relationship with Thurber. In a final scene, we see Thurber in a high school classroom. Having left academia, Thurber has chosen to focus on his teaching and his students.

== Cast ==
- Luke Wilson as Charlie Thurber
- David Koechner as Jay Hadley
- Gretchen Mol as Elaine Grasso
- Bob Gunton as retired professor William Thurber, father of Charlie
- Sasha Alexander as Margarette, Charlie's sister
- Andrew Daly as Warren, Yale professor
- Michael Cudlitz as police officer Tim
- Rosemarie DeWitt as Beth, Tim's girlfriend
- Lily Holleman as Blaire, student
- Lyman Chen as Steve Kim
- Zach Selwyn as Buck, Charlie's neighbor
- Keith Adams as Goth
- William Bogert as Grey College Dean Leakey
- Hillary Pingle as Robin, student, fond of professor Thurber
- Nathan Pham as Stan, student, head of the erotic poetry society

== Production ==
Tenure was filmed in Pennsylvania locations: Bryn Mawr College; Lower Merion High School; Rosemont College (including the historic Joseph Sinnott Mansion); the Garrett Hill section of Radnor Township; and the Foulkeways Retirement Community in Gwynedd. The film was shot within twenty-five days on a budget of $5 million.

== Reception ==
Belinda Acosta, film critic at The Austin Chronicle, gave the film a favorable review, writing, "Wilson's performance is as warm as a cardigan sweater. So, when a perky new hire (Gretchen Mol) threatens Charlie's already shaky position, instead of swerving into high anxiety Wilson plays it close to the chest. The even-handedness of the film (directed by Mike Million) is part of its charm. And while it's clear what's coming long before the end of the film, the journey to the obvious conclusion is no less satisfying." Variety's Ronnie Scheib found the film never anchoring itself firmly enough in academia to successfully parody it, "despite excellent thesping by Wilson and Gunton, and a hilarious extracurricular turn by Rosemarie DeWitt."
