= Richard T. Davis =

American soldier

- Born: March 14, 1978; Germany
- Died: July 15, 2003 (aged 25); Columbus, Georgia, United States
- Burial place: Sunset Hills Memorial Park, Apple Valley, CA
- Military career
- Allegiance: United States of America
- Branch: United States Army
- Service years: 1998–2003
- Rank: Specialist
- Units: Bravo Company; 1-15 Infantry; 3rd Heavy Brigade Combat Team; 3rd Infantry Division
- Conflicts: 2003 Invasion of Iraq
- Awards: Combat Infantryman Badge; National Defense Service Medal; Army Achievement Medal; Army Commendation Medal; Armed Forces Expeditionary Medal; Presidential Unit Citation

Specialist Richard Thomas Davis (March 14, 1978 – July 15, 2003) was an Infantryman in the United States Army. The son of two US Army veterans, Lanny and Remy Davis, he was born on an Army base in Germany. Davis enlisted in the Army in 1998 and served in Operation Joint Forge in Bosnia and later in the Iraq War, where he and his comrades participated in the April 11, 2003, "Midtown Massacre," a five-hour firefight in downtown Baghdad. On July 15, 2003, less than two days after returning from deployment to Iraq, Davis was murdered outside Fort Benning, Georgia by a fellow soldier from Bravo Company, Alberto Martinez. Three other soldiers were also present and involved in the events that led up to the killing and followed the killing.

Initially, the Army concluded that Davis deserted and despite pleas from Davis' father, would not initiate an investigation into his son's disappearance for nearly two months. Davis' remains were not found until November 2003. He had been stabbed in the head, neck, and chest at least thirty-three times. His body was later dismembered, doused in lighter fluid, and burned. Unnamed sources have suggested that Davis was killed because he had planned to make a complaint about a rape of an Iraqi woman by US troops.

On February 17, 2004, Mario Navarette, Alberto Martinez, Jacob Burgoyne, and Douglas Woodcoff were indicted by Georgia authorities for the murder. Burgoyne pleaded guilty to voluntary manslaughter and was sentenced to 20 years in prison. Woodcoff pleaded guilty to concealing the death of another and was sentenced to probation. At trial, Navarette was convicted of felony murder while in the commission of an aggravated assault, aggravated assault, possession of a knife during the commission of a crime, and concealing the death of another. Martinez was convicted of the same charges and malice murder. Navarette and Martinez were both sentenced to life plus fifteen years in prison.

The story of Davis's murder garnered national attention because he was killed by fellow soldiers and because of the possible role of post traumatic stress disorder as a factor in the crime. Davis's murder was the inspiration for the 2007 Academy Award-nominated film In the Valley of Elah.

== See also ==
- Mahmudiyah rape and killings
