= Blowtorch Entertainment =

- Company type: Private
- Industry: media, entertainment
- Founded: 2007
- Founders: Kelly Rodriques, Paul Schiff
- Defunct: 2009
- Fate: Ceased operations in 2009, revival efforts underway
- Area served: United States
- Key people: Kelly Rodriques, Paul Schiff, Alec Rodriques, Chris Madera
- Products: Movies; * Social media tools

Blowtorch Entertainment is a new media company that was co-founded by Kelly Rodriques and Paul Schiff (producer of My Cousin Vinny, Rushmore, and Date Movie). In November 2007, multiple Hollywood trades reported that Blowtorch Entertainment had raised significant funding to produce and distribute movies and to build a series of social media tools.

Blowtorch describes itself as "a media and entertainment company that creates, enables and distributes fun, authentic and provocative content. We go where our audience goes: online, theaters, live events and mobile."

According to The Economist, Blowtorch is "making video content for 18- to 24-year-old" and "it will allow audiences to influence movies via the web." In the December 27, 2007 issue of Fortune, Blowtorch was featured as one of "Six Leaps of Innovation." According to Fortune, "Schiff is in charge of producing and acquiring a stable of low-budget (under $5 million) feature-length films. Rodriques's job is to build social networks around the movies, inviting 18- to 24-year-old audiences to gather online before, after, and during the film."

Blowtorch Entertainment owns the rights to the film Spin, (previously titled You Are Here) starring Bijou Phillips, and is in post-production on the feature film Tenure. Tenure is a 2008 American comedy film, written and directed by Mike Million and starring Luke Wilson, Gretchen Mol, and David Koechner. The film was produced by Paul Schiff and is being released by Blowtorch as their first original production. Blowtorch will also be handling the U.S. theatrical release of the film Young People F***ing, which was initially released in Canada on June 13, 2008 and has received favorable critical reviews. Blowtorch is setting up its own theatrical distribution network in the U.S., and the company's home-video distribution is handled by Vivendi Visual Entertainment.

As of July 30, 2009, Blowtorch Entertainment was all but shut down, after several of the hedge funds that invested a total of $50 million into the venture went out of business. Blowtorch Chief Executive Kelly Rodriques notes that the company's board of directors has mostly disbanded and that its search for movie deals has ceased. Most of the venture's financing came in the form of debt from undisclosed hedge funds and 90% of this money has been returned to the investors. Moving forward, Rodriques expects to pay back the remainder of the funding with proceeds from the two properties currently in development. Blowtorch does not currently have a functioning website. However, Blowtorch is currently being revived by two young film pioneers Alec Rodriques and Chris Madera. Alec Rodriques, the son of Kelly Rodriques, has taken on the company name, and in teaming up with fellow film fanatic Chris, they hope to take visual film media to the next level.
