= In the Valley of Elah =

2007 film by Paul Haggis

- Theatrical release poster
- Directed by: Paul Haggis
- Screenplay by: Paul Haggis
- Story by: Mark Boal; Paul Haggis
- Produced by: Patrick Wachsberger; Steven Samuels; Darlene Caamaño Loquet; Paul Haggis; Laurence Becsey
- Starring: Tommy Lee Jones; Charlize Theron; Frances Fisher; Susan Sarandon
- Cinematography: Roger Deakins
- Edited by: Jo Francis
- Music by: Mark Isham
- Production companies: NALA Films; Samuels Media; Blackfriars Bridge
- Distributed by: Warner Independent Pictures (United States); Summit Entertainment (International)
- Release dates: September 1, 2007 (Venice Film Festival); September 14, 2007 (United States)
- Running time: 121 minutes
- Country: United States
- Language: English
- Budget: $23 million
- Box office: $29.5 million

In the Valley of Elah is a 2007 American crime drama film written and directed by Paul Haggis. The film stars Tommy Lee Jones, Charlize Theron, and Susan Sarandon. Its title refers to the Biblical valley where the battle between David and Goliath took place.

The film is based on actual events, although the characters' names and locations have been changed. The screenplay was inspired by journalist Mark Boal's "Death and Dishonor", an article about the murder case published in Playboy magazine in 2004. It portrays a military father's search for his son and, after his body is found, subsequent hunt for his son's killers. The film explores themes including the Iraq War, abuse of prisoners, and post-traumatic stress disorder (PTSD).

In the Valley of Elah premiered at the Venice Film Festival on September 1, 2007 before being released by Warner Independent Pictures in the United States on September 14, 2007, with Summit Entertainment releasing in other territories. The film received positive reviews from critics and grossed $29.5 million against a $23 million budget. At the 80th Academy Awards, Jones was nominated for the Academy Award for Best Actor.

== Plot ==
On November 1, 2004, Hank Deerfield, a gravel trucker and retired military police sergeant living in Monroe, Tennessee with his wife Joan, is notified that his son Mike, a soldier recently returned from Iraq, has gone missing. Hank drives to Mike's base in New Mexico to look for him; leaving home, he helps a school custodian raise the American flag correctly. At Fort Rudd, Hank meets his son's squad, and secretly takes Mike's cell phone from his belongings. Watching videos recovered from the phone, he attempts to report Mike's disappearance to police detective Emily Sanders who is unable to help out. He reaches out to a friend formerly at Army CID, also without success.

When Mike's burned and dismembered body is discovered, Fort Rudd claims jurisdiction over the investigation, believing a pipe found under Mike's mattress and recent heroin smuggling arrests on base point to a drug-related murder. Hank persuades Sanders to show him the crime scene, and realizes a green car spotted at the scene was actually blue. Belittled by her male colleagues, Sanders convinces the local sheriff to pursue the investigation, and Mike's squadmate SPC Gordon Bonner reaches out to Hank.

After viewing her son's remains, Joan returns home and receives a package Mike mailed to himself, which Hank urges her not to open. Mike's credit card history leads Sanders and Hank to a restaurant where he ate with at least two others shortly before his death. Sanders gets copies of sworn statements from Mike's squad by Army investigators, who prevent her from interviewing them herself. She dines with Hank and he tells her young son the story of the Biblical David's battle with Goliath in the Valley of Elah.

Hank learns that Mike and Corporal Steve Penning were kicked out of a strip club the night Mike was killed. Penning, Bonner, and Specialist Ennis Long admit to Sanders they lied in their statements, and after Mike got the four of them kicked out of the club, he fought Bonner in the parking lot then paid the bill at the restaurant. The group visited a prostitute before leaving Mike, who was looking to buy drugs. Hank refuses to believe Mike's fellow soldiers could be involved in his death.

Hank and the police determine that Private Robert Ortiz, who is AWOL, has a history of drug smuggling and a blue car. Following the police as they raid his residence, Hank subdues the fleeing Ortiz and beats him until detectives intervene. Ortiz is arrested, but Bonner is found hanged with Mike's grandfather's watch in his pocket. Sanders concludes that Bonner, who also owned a blue car, killed Mike. She learns that Angie, a soldier's wife who came to her for help, has been murdered by her husband.

Hank sends his son's remains home and Penning helps jump-start his truck, reminiscing about Mike. Sanders matches Penning's handwriting to the signature on Mike's last credit card statement, proving they used his credit card at the restaurant. Penning has already received a plea deal, but at Sanders' insistence, she and Hank hear him confess to stabbing Mike after a minor quarrel. Hank asks him about a video of Mike torturing a captive insurgent, and the emotionally distant Penning explains, "We all do stupid things" and states that anyone could have died in that quarrel or a similar one, and that Mike "was the smart one [and that] he could see", thereby implying Mike may have brought the aggression upon himself out of nihilistic despondency and the realization of the group's inability to readjust to civilian life.

Collecting Mike's belongings, Hank apologizes to Ortiz, who has been honorably discharged. Haunted by his last conversation with his son, after Mike drove over an Iraqi child playing in the road, Hank thanks Sanders and returns home. He finds Joan opened Mike's package, which contains a picture of his squad and a folded flag. Returning to the local school's flagpole, Hank flies his son's flag upside down.

== Cast ==
- Tommy Lee Jones as Hank Deerfield
- Charlize Theron as Detective Emily Sanders
- Susan Sarandon as Joan Deerfield
- Jonathan Tucker as Mike "Doc" Deerfield
- James Franco as Sergeant First Class Dan Carnelli
- Josh Brolin as Chief Simon Buchwald
- Frances Fisher as Eve
- Wayne Duvall as Detective Nugent
- Jason Patric as First Lieutenant Kirklander
- Victor Wolf as Private Robert Ortiz
- Brent Briscoe as Detective Hodge
- Greg Serano as Detective Manny Nuñez
- Barry Corbin as Arnold Bickman
- Brent Sexton as Lieutenant Burke
- Zoe Kazan as Angie
- Wes Chatham as Corporal Steve Penning
- Glenn Taranto as Detective Wayne
- Jake McLaughlin as Specialist Gordon Bonner
- Sean Huze as Captain Jim Osher
- Mehcad Brooks as Specialist Ennis Long
- Rick Gonzalez as Phone Technician
- Kathy Lamkin as Chicken Shack Manager
- Jo Harvey Allen as Jo Anne
- Mike Hatfield as Jo Anne's Husband
- Arlin Alcala as the neighbor

== Production ==
=== Factual basis ===
Although the film story is fictional, with the names and locations changed, it is based on the facts of the murder case of Richard T. Davis of Baker Company, 1-15 IN. Davis was an Iraq War veteran who was murdered soon after his return home in 2003. Richard Davis's father, Lanny Davis, was a former military police officer. He mounted his own investigation into the crime, as did the character played by Jones in the film. Davis commented, "It's a strong movie and a good movie. And it's going to make a lot of people think."

In 2004, freelance journalist Mark Boal wrote an article about Richard Davis's murder, entitled "Death and Dishonor," published in Playboy. This inspired Haggis, who adapted the account for his screenplay.

Davis's story was told in a 2006 episode, "Duty, Death and Dishonor," of the CBS News program 48 Hours Mystery.

A non-fiction book about the murder case, by author Cilla McCain, titled Murder in Baker Company: How Four American Soldiers Killed One of Their Own was published in 2009 by Chicago Review Press.

=== Screenplay and casting ===
Haggis initially approached Clint Eastwood to play the part of Hank Deerfield, which Haggis had written for him. Eastwood declined the opportunity because he was involved with other projects.

== Release and reception ==
The film premiered September 1, 2007, at the Venice Film Festival and was later shown at the Toronto International Film Festival. It opened in a somewhat limited release in the United States on September 14, 2007, eventually grossing $6.7 million domestically, making it a box office disappointment. The film opened in the United Kingdom on January 25, 2008.

As of March 20, 2022, review aggregator Rotten Tomatoes reports a 74% approval rating based on 164 reviews, with an average score of 7.00/10. The site's consensus reads: "Though some of Paul Haggis's themes are heavy-handed, In the Valley of Elah is otherwise an engrossing murder mystery and antiwar statement, featuring a mesmerizing performance from Tommy Lee Jones". On Metacritic, the film has an average score of 65 out of 100, based on 37 reviews, indicating "generally favorable" reviews.

Time magazine's Richard Corliss named the film one of the Top 10 Movies of 2007, ranking it at #8. In his review, Corliss praised the film as an improvement on Paul Haggis's Oscar-winning Crash, calling it "strong in the sleuthing, sobering in its political conclusions." Corliss singled out Tommy Lee Jones's performance, saying his "drained humanity anchors this excellent drama." Time critic Richard Schickel also ranked the film #8 on his own Top 10 list, saying that the film "is a spare, taciturn, devastating account of what happens to the souls of soldiers forced to fight wars for which not even phony or temporary justifications are offered them."

The film was criticized by some as having a heavy-handed approach. Stephen Hunter of The Washington Post wrote, "Haggis also appears to have no respect for his audience. At its crudest, the film settles for agitprop." Kenneth Turan of the Los Angeles Times said that "the characters in this sombre film have the glum look of individuals delivering a Very Important Message to the world. And though this film in fact does have something crucial to convey, this is not the way to go about it." Conversely, Stephanie Zacharek of Salon was critical of the film for not going far enough, saying that it "chickens out."

=== Awards and nominations ===
Haggis won an award given by the SIGNIS at the 2007 Venice Film Festival, where the film was in contention for the Golden Lion. Tommy Lee Jones was nominated for the Best Actor Oscar at the 80th Academy Awards. The film also made the National Board of Review's list of Top Ten Independent Films of the year.
