= Travis Nelson (actor) =

Canadian actor

- Born: September 8, 1990 (age 36); Fort St. John, British Columbia, Canada
- Occupation: Actor
- Years active: 2009–present

Travis Nelson (born September 8, 1990) is a Canadian actor. He is known for his role as Riley in the comedy series The Lake.

== Early life ==
Nelson was born on September 8, 1990, in Fort St. John, British Columbia.

== Career ==
Nelson began his acting career in 2009, when he made his television acting debut in the drama series Wild Roses. In 2010, Nelson made his feature film debut in the black comedy horror film Tucker & Dale vs. Evil, in which he played Chuck. On the same year, he made his television film debut in Meteor Storm, in which he played the role of Brad.

Nelson appeared as Brandon Hessner in the narrative mobile application Haunting Melissa, and repeated his role in the horror thriller film Dark Hearts.

Nelson's break-out role came in 2019, when he appeared in the romantic comedy television film Mistletoe Magic, in which he played Mark. In 2020, Nelson starred with Celeste Desjardins in the thriller television films Obsession: Her Final Vengeance, Obsession: Escaping My Ex and Obsession: Stalked by My Lover, in which he played Blake Collins.

In the same year, Nelson starred in the drama series I Am Syd Stone, in which he played the lead role as Syd Stone. Also the same year, Nelson starred in the romantic comedy drama television film Homemade Christmas as Kurt.

In 2021, Nelson appeared as Eddie in the crime drama series Clarice. On the same year, Nelson starred in the television film Secretly Santa with Alicia Dea Josipovic.

In 2022, Nelson appeared as Thomas in the romantic comedy drama film Tehranto.

Nelson was cast in the role of Riley, the love interest of lead character Justin, in the comedy series The Lake.

== Filmography ==
Year	Title	Role	Notes
2009	Wild Roses	Craig	3 episodes
2010	Tucker & Dale vs. Evil	Chuck	
2010	Meteor Storm	Brad	TV Film
2011	Fringe	Jack	Episode: "6:02 AM EST"
2011	Supernatural	Swim Student No. 1 / Leviathan	Episode: "Hello, Cruel World"
2012	Ghosts of Europe	Erich Koehler	Short film
2013	Motive	Stoner	Episode: "Creeping Tom"
2013	Whispers of Life	Tom	Short film
2013	Haunting Melissa	Brandon Hessner	2 episodes
2014	Dark Hearts	Brandon Hessner	
2019	In the Dark	Guy	Episode: "Pilot"
2019	Jett	Rick Kid No. 1	Episode: "Frank Sweeney"
2019	Sleep Stop	Malcolm	Short film
2019	Mistletoe Magic	Mark	TV Film
2019	Mind Fudge	Dream Man	Episode: "A Streetcar Named Warhorse"
2020	Obsession: Stalked by My Lover	Blake Collins	TV Film
2020	Obsession: Escaping My Ex	Blake Collins	TV Film
2020	Obsession: Her Final Vengeance	Blake Collins	TV Film
2020	I Am Syd Stone	Syd Stone	Main role / 6 episodes
2020	Homemade Christmas	Kurt	TV Film
2021	Clarice	Eddie	3 episodes
2021	Secretly Santa	Paul	TV Film
2021	Goldstar	Sammy	Short film
2022	Tehranto	Thomas	
2022	The Recruit	Linus	2 episodes
2022–present	The Lake	Riley	Main role
2023	Vindicta	Detective Stan Russo	
2024	Murdoch Mysteries	Joseph Greyson	2 episodes
