= Kung Fu High School =

2005 novel by Ryan Gattis

- US issue cover
- Author: Ryan Gattis
- Cover artist: Marshall Arisman
- Language: English
- Subject: Action drama fiction
- Genre: Novel, Action fiction
- Publisher: Harvest Books
- Publication date: 2005
- Publication place: United States
- Pages: 288

Kung Fu High School is an action/romance novel written by Ryan Gattis, his second novel, and published by Harvest Books, a subsidiary of Harcourt Books. The book explores the mind of a young girl named Jen who, along with her brother Cue and legendary martial artist cousin, Jimmy Chang, attends Kung Fu High School, where a powerful drug kingpin named Ridley pits all students against each other in order to maintain control over his corrupt business he runs using the students he controls. Jimmy Chang, just having come from the most prestigious martial arts academy in Hong Kong with a record of 2,412 wins and zero losses and no hits scored on him on all of his tournaments, is pulled into the mess that is Kung Fu High School, and Jen's life. However, Jimmy has promised his mother never to engage in a fight, after leaving four thugs on the ground during an attempted assault. The only thing wrong with that promise, is the fact that Kung Fu High School's acceptance rule is to get "kicked in", a violent ritual where all students, being a martial artist in one way or another, gang up to beat on people, and nobody, not even the legendary Jimmy Chang, can get past this rule.

== Plot ==
Jen, a teenage girl, and her brother Kyuzo, or Cue as she calls him, attend Martin Luther King High School, nicknamed "Kung Fu High School". However, due to drug trafficking by a notorious drug kingpin named Ridley, it has become a rundown war zone for both his workers and those who despise him. The only things the students at Kung Fu have in common are their ability to fight, and the fact that they've all been "kicked in"—A welcoming practice at Kung Fu where students are beaten by everyone in order to teach them they are in the school.

The story starts off with Jen living an already irregular life, having to put on armor before going to school. One day Jen's long-lost cousin Jimmy Chang arrives at her front door, sent by her late mother's sister.

== Film adaptation ==
In October 2005, The Weinstein Company acquired the rights to the novel with Ernesto Foronda set to write the screenplay and Neal Edelstein and Mike Macari producing under their Macari/Edelstein production company.
