= Haunting Melissa =

2013 horror series released as a mobile app

- Promotional key art
- Genre: Horror
- Written by: Andrew Klavan
- Directed by: Neal Edelstein
- Starring: Kassia Warshawski
- Country of origin: United States
- Original language: English

Production
- Producer: Neal Edelstein
- Production locations: Calgary, Alberta
- Production company: Hooked Digital Media

Original release
- Network: iOS app (App Store)
- Release: May 16, 2013

Related
- Dark Hearts: The Secret of Haunting Melissa

Haunting Melissa is a 2013 horror series released as an iOS mobile app for iPhone and iPad. It was produced and directed by Neal Edelstein, written by Andrew Klavan, and published by Hooked Digital Media. Released on May 16, 2013, it was distributed as a downloadable episodic series and used "Dynamic Story Elements" (DSE), which changed details within scenes on repeat viewings.

== Plot ==
Melissa disappears while seeking the truth behind her mother's death in an isolated farmhouse.

== Cast ==
- Stefanie Bartlett as Goth Girl
- Jasmine Berg as Holly
- Don Bland as Investigator
- Tom Carey as Deputy Roy
- Lorette Clow as Dr. Carroway
- Alix Dale as Sally
- Verner Habraken as ATM Man
- Christian Kerr as Carter
- Greg Lawson as Jack Strogue
- Barb Mitchell as Katherine Strogue
- Lisa Moreau as Amanda Maynard
- Travis Nelson as Brandon
- Larry Reese as Mike Cole
- Kassia Warshawski as Melissa Strogue
- Lisa Webber
- Eugene Malmberg as Hardware Store Man
- Josie Malmberg as Hardware Store Girl
- Randy Laycraft as Pipewrench Man
- Nicole Zylstra as Attendant

== Production ==
The series was filmed in Calgary, Alberta.

== Sequel ==
A sequel, Dark Hearts: The Secret of Haunting Melissa, was released for iOS in November 2014. Again directed and produced by Edelstein and written by Klavan, it begins a month after the events of Haunting Melissa and brings back the character of Melissa while introducing new characters. Where the first series imitated found footage, the sequel was shot in a more cinematic style. As with the original, chapters were released at irregular intervals announced by push notifications, and the app again used Dynamic Story Elements. The first chapter was free, with later chapters sold individually or through a season pass.
