= Brooklynn Proulx =

Canadian former child actress

- Born: Brooklynn Marie Proulx; April 27, 1999 (age 27); Cranbrook, British Columbia, Canada
- Years active: 2004–2011

Brooklynn Marie Proulx (born April 27, 1999) is a Canadian former child actress. Her first role was playing Paris Jackson in a film about American singer Michael Jackson.

== Career ==
In 2005, she played Jenny at age 4 in Brokeback Mountain. In 2007 she played Mary James in the historical western film The Assassination of Jesse James by the Coward Robert Ford. In 2009 she played young Clare in The Time Traveler's Wife. In 2010 she played Sammy Jessup in 6 Souls starring Julianne Moore as her mother Cara Harding-Jessup, and Laura Forester in Piranha 3D.

In 2009, she was nominated in the 36th edition of the Saturn Award for Best Performance by a Younger Actor for her role in The Time Traveler's Wife.

In 2011, she was officially retired from acting.

== Filmography ==
Year	Film	Role	Notes
2004	Man in the Mirror: The Michael Jackson Story	Paris Jackson	TV movie
2005	Brokeback Mountain	Jenny, age 4	
2005	Six Figures	Sophie	
2006	Touch The Top of the World	Emma Weihenmeyer, age 6	TV movie
2007	Don't Cry Now	Amanda	TV movie
2007	Saving Grace	Maddy	Episode "Pilot"
2007	The Assassination of Jesse James by the Coward Robert Ford	Mary James	
2007	Lost Holiday: The Jim & Suzanne Shemwell Story	Taryn	TV movie
2008	The Lazarus Project	Katie	
2008	Fireflies in the Garden	Leslie Lawrence	
2009	The Time Traveler's Wife	Young Clare	
2010	Shelter aka 6 Souls	Sammy Jessup	
2010	Valentine's Day	Madison	
2010	Piranha 3D	Laura Forester	
2011	Dear Santa	Sharla	TV movie
