= Fractured (2019 film) =

2019 American thriller film

- Official poster
- Directed by: Brad Anderson
- Written by: Alan B. McElroy
- Produced by: Neal Edelstein; Mike Macari; Paul Schiff
- Starring: Sam Worthington; Lily Rabe; Stephen Tobolowsky; Adjoa Andoh; Lucy Capri
- Cinematography: Björn Charpentier
- Edited by: Robert Mead
- Music by: Anton Sanko
- Production companies: Koji Productions; Crow Island Films; Macari/Edelstein; Paul Schiff Productions
- Distributed by: Netflix
- Release dates: September 22, 2019 (Fantastic Fest); October 11, 2019 (United States)
- Running time: 100 minutes
- Country: United States
- Language: English

Fractured is a 2019 American psychological thriller film directed by Brad Anderson from a screenplay by Alan B. McElroy. It stars Sam Worthington, Lily Rabe, Stephen Tobolowsky, Adjoa Andoh, and Lucy Capri. It follows Ray Monroe (Worthington) searching for his missing wife and daughter after suffering a head injury that might be twisting his perception of reality.

The film had its world premiere at Fantastic Fest on September 22, 2019, followed by a Netflix streaming release on October 11, 2019, to mixed reviews from critics.

== Plot ==
Ray is driving home with his wife Joanne and daughter Peri after a Thanksgiving visit to Joanne's parents and argue about the state of their relationship. Peri needs to use the restroom, so they take a break at a gas station. After returning to the car, Peri cannot find her compact mirror. Joanne goes to check the restroom, and Ray searches the back seat. While Ray is distracted, Peri is menaced by a stray dog and starts backing towards an exposed pit. Ray throws a rock to scare the dog, which causes Peri to fall into the hole. Ray dives in after her and hits his head. He comes around in a daze, and a distressed Joanne has climbed down and is checking Peri for injuries. After his head clears, he picks Peri up and decides to bring her to a nearby hospital they passed a few miles back to see to her arm.

During the admissions process, they are asked if they would be willing for Peri to be placed on the organ donor register. Peri is seen by a doctor who concludes that her arm is broken but wants her to have a CAT scan in case she has a head injury. Joanne accompanies her to the scanning facility in the basement, while Ray falls asleep in the waiting area.

Ray awakens hours later and asks the hospital staff if he can see his wife and daughter, but is told they have no record of them. Most of the doctors have changed shift, and the only nurse still there said that Ray came alone and was treated for a head wound. Ray becomes distressed, is restrained by security and after being given a sedative is locked in a room. He escapes and waves down two police officers to who agree to investigate.

More evidence is found in the hospital that his family was never there, and Ray is taken by the police to the gas station. They find a large bloodstain in the pit and attempt to arrest Ray. He takes an officer's gun and locks them in the gas station before returning to the hospital. He reaches the basement, after fighting with security, and finds that Peri is about to have her organs harvested. He drags her out of the operating theatre, along with a drugged Joanne, shooting a doctor as they leave.

As they drive away, it is revealed that his family died in the pit; Peri from her fall and Joanne after she was pushed onto a spike by Ray. Their bodies were in the back of the car the whole time and the events of the hospital visit were the result of Ray's psyche trying to deny the reality of what happened. On the back seat, a seriously ill patient who Ray extracted from surgery lies unconscious.

== Cast ==
- Sam Worthington as Ray Monroe
- Lily Rabe as Joanne Monroe
- Stephen Tobolowsky as Dr. Berthram
- Adjoa Andoh as Dr. Jacobs
- Lucy Capri as Peri Monroe
- Lauren Cochrane as Lauren Cochrane
- Shane Dean as Officer Griggs
- Marina Stephenson Kerr as Receptionist

== Production ==
In November 2018, Sam Worthington signed to star, with Brad Anderson attached to direct Alan B. McElroy's script, Paul Schiff, Neal Edelstein, and Mike Macari producing, and Netflix distributing. In December 2018, Lily Rabe, Stephen Tobolowsky, Adjoa Andoh, and Lucy Capri joined the cast. Production began that month. Principal photography for the film took place on location in Winnipeg, Manitoba, Canada from November 2018 to January 2019.

== Release ==
The film had its world premiere at Fantastic Fest on September 22, 2019. It was released on Netflix on October 11, 2019.

== Reception ==
On the review aggregator website Rotten Tomatoes, 56% of 27 critics' reviews are positive, with an average rating of 5.7/10. The website's consensus reads: "Led by an arresting Sam Worthington performance, Fractured is a reasonably diverting mystery with enough thrills to make up for a familiar story." Metacritic, which uses a weighted average, assigned the film a score of 36 out of 100, based on 5 critics, indicating "generally unfavorable" reviews.

Brian Tallerico of RogerEbert.com gave a rating of only one star out of four, deriding the lack of energy brought to the film by director Anderson and "company". Meagan Navarro of Bloody Disgusting gave a mixed review of two-and-a-half stars out of five, positively commenting on the film's attempt at innovating on a familiar concept. However, she criticized the cliché nature of said concept, saying it has "a serious level of predictability no matter how hard Anderson tries to throw you off." David Ehrlich, writing for IndieWire, gave a rating of C−, saying the movie "is so dull on both sides that the right diagnosis isn't enough to save it.

In a positive three out of five star review published by The Guardian, Benjamin Lee writes: "When I wasn't busying myself making an internal checklist of films I was reminded of, I was happily playing armchair detective, curious enough to engage with the pieces I was given."
