= Jieho Lee =

- Born: 1973 (age 52–53); New York, New York
- Height: 5 ft 8 in (173 cm)
- Spouse(s): Kim Min (Kim Min-jeong) (m. 2006)

Korean name
- Hangul: 이지호
- RR: I Jiho
- MR: I Chiho

Jieho Lee (born 1973) is a filmmaker from New York City. He graduated from Wesleyan University in 1995, receiving a double degree in Cinema Studies and the College of Letters. He received an M.B.A. from the Harvard Business School. His short film A Nursery Tale (1999) won the Special Jury Award at the Florida Film Festival for Best Short.

Lee married actress Kim Min in 2006. They met while Kim was shooting the drama series Love Story in Harvard.

== Filmography ==
- A Nursery Tale (1999)
- The Air I Breathe (2007)
