= Murders of Susan and Kimberly Pittman =

2002 double murder in Georgia

- Susan Pittman (Left), Kimberly Pittman (Right)
- Location: Savannah, Chatham County, Georgia, U.S.
- Date: April 11, 2002; 24 years ago
- Attack type: Murder, torture, child rape
- Victims: Susan Pittman, 41; Kimberly Anne Pittman, 13
- Perpetrators: Dorian Frank O'Kelley; Darryl Scott Stinski
- Convictions: Malice murder (2 counts)
- Sentence: Death

On April 11, 2002, in Savannah, Georgia, a mother-daughter pair, Susan and Kimberly Pittman, were attacked and murdered by two men. The murderers, Darryl Scott Stinski (born June 21, 1983) and Dorian Frank O'Kelley (born October 11, 1981), tortured both victims and raped 13-year-old Kimberly before setting their house on fire; Kimberly died as a result of smoke inhalation while her 41-year-old mother Susan succumbed to fatal assault and knife wounds. O'Kelley and Stinski were both found guilty of the double murder and sentenced to death in 2005 and 2007 respectively. Both men are currently on death row awaiting their executions at the Georgia Diagnostic and Classification State Prison.

== Murders ==
On April 11, 2002, a mother-daughter pair were tortured and murdered by two men at their home in Savannah, Georgia.

On the night before the double murder, the two killers, Dorian Frank O'Kelley and Darryl Scott Stinski, attempted to break into a nearby residence to commit burglary, but their plan was aborted after an alarm went off, which forced the duo to flee the house. Afterwards, the pair selected another house for their next attempt. At the time when O'Kelley and Stinski broke into their second house, 41-year-old Susan Pittman (October 7, 1960 – April 11, 2002) and her 13-year-old daughter Kimberly Pittman (September 16, 1988 – April 11, 2002) were both present inside the house.

Upon entering the house, O'Kelley and Stinski cut off the electricity in the house and while both the Pittmans were asleep, the pair first attacked Susan by beating her with a flashlight and walking cane. Subsequently, Stinski went to Kimberly's room to subdue the girl, who was awakened by her mother's screams, and took her upstairs to stop her from continuing to hear her mother's screams. O'Kelley then stabbed Susan three to four times in the chest and abdomen, fatally wounding her.

After murdering Susan, O'Kelley and Stinski brought Kimberly downstairs and drank beverages for a while before bringing their hostage back upstairs, where they gagged and bound her; O'Kelley also raped Kimberly while Stinski was searching the house for valuables. Afterwards, the two men used a baseball bat to batter Kimberly severely, before they both used two different knives to slit Kimberly's throat and stabbed her in the torso and legs, and even kicked her and threw objects at her head. Despite the brutal attack, Kimberly remained alive, and eventually, after the two men set fire to the house, Kimberly died of smoke inhalation as induced by the fire.

Shortly after the double murder, Dorian O'Kelley, who lived across the street from the Pittmans, had given a television interview at the scene of the fire before police considered him a suspect. In the interview, he expressed fear that the fire might spread to his own home, a statement that later raised suspicions. According to a trial witness, Darryl Stinski laughed when he saw the reporters interviewing O'Kelley on live television. Subsequently, a police officer identified O'Kelley as one of two men he had witnessed acting suspiciously nearby the Pittmans' residence, and as a result, O'Kelley was arrested as a suspect behind the crime. Stinski was similarly arrested days after the double murder. Together, both men were charged with multiple counts of malice murder, arson, burglary and other offences. Among the indictment, the most serious charge of malice murder carries either the death penalty or life imprisonment without the possibility of parole under Georgia state law.

== Trial of Dorian O'Kelley ==
2025 Mugshot of Dorian Frank O'Kelley

Dorian O'Kelley was the first of the Pittman murderers to stand trial for the case on November 1, 2005. The jury selection of his trial was conducted in late October 2005.

During the trial, the court heard the taped confession of O'Kelley, who admitted to the killings and arson. The prosecution also introduced evidence to show that O'Kelley had kept a broken tooth of Kimberly as a souvenir of the murders, and according to a friend of the defendant, he heard O'Kelley bragging about the murders and was also shown the broken tooth. While the prosecution sought to prove O'Kelley's guilt and also presented evidence of the brutal nature of the slayings, the defense argued that rather than being a killer, their client was a victim plagued with mental problems, lack of an education and child abuse.

On November 3, 2005, the jury convicted O'Kelley of the malice murders of Kimberly and Susan Pittman.

During the sentencing phase of O'Kelley's trial, his defense sought to introduce evidence of O'Kelley's troubled childhood, including instances of him being abused physically, mentally and sexually by his mother and stepfather, as well as his estranged relationship with his biological father and poverty he suffered as a child, and his history of substance abuse in school. O'Kelley's birth father also came to court as a witness. On the other hand, the prosecution sought the death penalty for O'Kelley and stated that the defendant had mercilessly taken two innocent lives with sheer brutality, and the punishment itself should fit the crime.

On November 8, 2005, 24-year-old Dorian O'Kelley was sentenced to death upon the jury's unanimous recommendation for capital punishment. According to O'Kelley's trial lawyers, they described their case of defending O'Kelley at trial as the hardest they came across in their careers, and they found it disappointing that they failed to persuade the jury against sentencing O'Kelley to death. The lawyers also stated they still felt sympathy for the victims and never denied O'Kelley's guilt, and they felt they needed to do their job to represent even the most heinous criminal regardless of their views towards the case.

== Trial of Darryl Stinski ==
2025 Mugshot of Darryl Stinski

Darryl Stinski became the second perpetrator to claim trial for the double murder. Before his trial could commence, Stinski filed an appeal to prevent his taped confession from being admitted into trial evidence. The appeal was denied in February 2007.

On May 27, 2007, the trial of Stinski began with the jury selection phase commencing in Macon due to pre-trial publicity. The trial was presided by a Bibb County jury, after the trial judge, Chatham County Superior Court Judge James F. Bass Jr., ordered the trial be moved from Chatham County to Bibb County. Likewise, the prosecution were seeking the death penalty for Stinski.

Stinski elected to not enter his defense, but according to his police statements, which were revealed in court, he argued that he was innocent, claiming that the killings were the result of a burglary that gone wrong, and that he had no knowledge that his accomplice, O'Kelley, would commit the murders. He partially admitted to having beaten the victims but pushed the blame on O'Kelley for fatally stabbing Susan, and slitting the throat of Kimberly, before suggesting to burn down the house to destroy fire, an act that ultimately claimed the life of Kimberly. The defense also did not call upon any witnesses to testify for them, although the prosecution refuted Stinski's contention and claimed that he lied to distance himself from his guilt.

On June 8, 2007, the jury found Stinski guilty of all charges, including two counts each of malice murder and felony murder. The prosecution sought the death penalty for Stinski based on the heinous nature of the double murder, while the defense asked the jury to exercise their right to mercy by sentencing Stinski to life in prison without parole, stating that he was a victim of child abuse and neglect by his family, and was scarred by the broken marriages of his biological parents, which likely contributed to psychiatric problems in his later life.

On June 12, 2007, at the end of the trial's sentencing phase, the jury returned with their verdict, unanimously sentencing Stinski to death for both counts of murdering Kimberly and Susan Pittman. The jury found that both murders were occurred in the course of an ongoing burglary and involved both aggravating factors like depravity of mind and aggravated battery, and hence opted to sentence Stinski to a double death sentence rather than life without parole.

On June 13, 2007, 23-year-old Darryl Stinski was formally sentenced to death for malice murder by Chatham County Superior Court Judge James F. Bass Jr., who additionally imposed sentences of 140 years in prison for the other convictions like arson, burglary and cruelty to children.

== Appeals ==
=== O'Kelley's appeals ===
In May 2008, Dorian O'Kelley filed an appeal against the trial ruling. On November 3, 2008, the Georgia Supreme Court dismissed O'Kelley's appeal against his murder conviction and death sentence.

On March 1, 2010, the Georgia Supreme Court rejected a second appeal from O'Kelley and upheld his death sentence, although one of his prison terms for arson was vacated for re-sentencing.

On March 30, 2015, the Butts County Superior Court turned down O'Kelley's appeal.

On February 2, 2017, U.S. District Judge William Theodore Moore Jr. dismissed O'Kelley's federal appeal.

On March 7, 2018, U.S. District Judge Moore dismissed O'Kelley's second federal appeal.

=== Stinski's appeals ===
In October 2009, Darryl Stinski filed an appeal to the Georgia Supreme Court. On March 2, 2010, the Georgia Supreme Court rejected Stinski's appeal against his death sentence and murder conviction.

On December 20, 2023, the 11th Circuit Court of Appeals denied Stinski's appeal.

On December 16, 2024, the U.S. Supreme Court dismissed Stinski's final appeal.

== Aftermath and current status ==
Throughout the following years, both Darryl Stinski and Dorian O'Kelley were listed as two of the most notorious criminals from Chatham County, Georgia.

In 2020, Stinski and fellow death row inmate Michael Nance, who was convicted of a carjacking and murder case, co-authored a book, titled A Look Through Deaths Door: Collective Works from the Row: The Artistic Expression of Darryl Stinski and Artwork of Michael Nance, which were a compilation of artworks of inmates on death row.

As of 2025, both Stinski and O'Kelley remain incarcerated on death row at the Georgia Diagnostic and Classification State Prison.

== See also ==
- Capital punishment in Georgia (U.S. state)
- List of death row inmates in the United States § Georgia
