= Max Winkler (director) =

American director and screenwriter (born 1983)

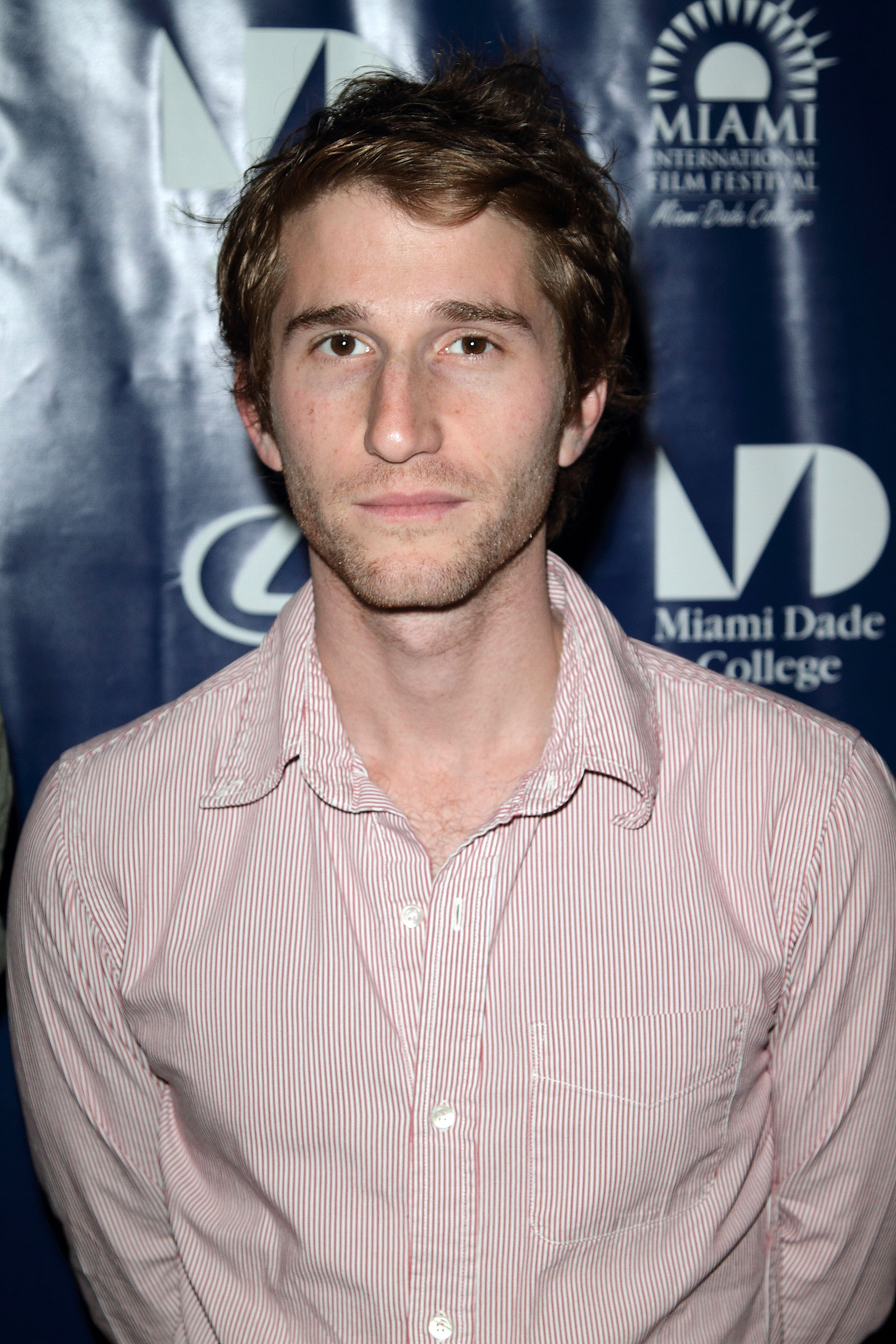
- Winkler at the 2011 Miami International Film Festival showing of Ceremony
- Born: Max Daniel Winkler; August 18, 1983 (age 43); Los Angeles, California, U.S.
- Occupations: Film director, screenwriter, television director
- Years active: 1993, 2006–present
- Spouse: Jessica Barden (m. 2021)
- Children: 2
- Father: Henry Winkler

Max Daniel Winkler (born August 18, 1983) is an American director and screenwriter.

== Early life and education ==
Born on August 18, 1983, in Los Angeles, California, Winkler is the son of Stacey Weitzman and actor Henry Winkler. He is Jewish, and his grandparents fled Germany before the Holocaust. As a child, he had a small role in the 1993 film Cop and a Half, a film his father directed.

He graduated from the USC School of Cinematic Arts in 2006.

== Career ==
Winkler's credits include writing and directing the film Ceremony (2010), starring Michael Angarano and Uma Thurman. The film was Winkler's feature film directorial debut.

== Personal life ==
Winkler married Jessica Barden in March 2021. The couple announced the birth of their daughter on 19 October 2021.

== Filmography ==
=== Short film ===
| Year | Title | Director | Writer | Producer |
|---|---|---|---|---|
| 2006 | The King of Central Park | Yes | Yes | Yes |
| 2013 | It's Not You It's Me | No | No | Yes |

Executive producer

- Ten Fingers (2010)

=== Feature film ===
| Year | Title | Director | Writer |
|---|---|---|---|
| 2010 | Ceremony | Yes | Yes |
| 2017 | Flower | Yes | Yes |
| 2019 | Jungleland | Yes | Yes |
| 2020 | Magic Camp | No | Yes |

Executive producer

- Cat Run (2011)

=== Television ===
| Year | Title | Director | Executive Producer | Notes |
|---|---|---|---|---|
| 2006 | Clark and Michael | Yes | No | 10 episodes (Also producer) |
| 2007 | Wainy Days | Yes | No | 1 episode, also co-writer |
| 2012–2013 | The New Normal | Yes | No | 4 episodes |
| 2013–2014 | New Girl | Yes | No | 7 episodes |
| 2014–2016 | Brooklyn Nine-Nine | Yes | No | 2 episodes |
| 2015 | Fresh Off the Boat | Yes | No | 1 episode |
| 2015 | Casual | Yes | No | 2 episodes |
| 2015 | The Grinder | Yes | No | 1 episode |
| 2016 | Lady Dynamite | Yes | No | 2 episodes |
| 2017 | Crazy Ex-Girlfriend | Yes | No | 1 episode |
| 2021 | Cruel Summer | Yes | Yes | 1 episode |
| 2021–2023 | American Horror Stories | Yes | Yes | 3 episodes |
| 2021–2022 | American Horror Story | Yes | No | 2 episodes |
| 2022 | The Watcher | Yes | No | 1 episode |
| 2022–2023 | Minx | Yes | No | 3 episodes |
| 2023 | School Spirits | Yes | Yes | 2 episodes |
| 2024 | Feud: Capote vs. The Swans | Yes | No | 1 episode |
| 2024 | Monsters: The Lyle and Erik Menendez Story | Yes | No | 1 episode |
| 2024 | Grotesquerie | Yes | Yes | 5 episodes |
| 2025 | Monster: The Ed Gein Story | Yes | Yes | 8 episodes (Note: 6 directed and 8 executive produced per season.) |
| 2026 | Monster: The Lizzie Borden Story | Yes | Yes | 8 episodes |

=== Other credits ===
- Cop and a Half (actor, 1993)
- A Cut Above (short film, production designer, 2006)
- Arrested Development (actor, 2013)
