= Reece Thompson =

Canadian actor

- Born: Reece Daniel Thompson; 22 November 1988 (age 37); White Rock, British Columbia, Canada
- Occupation: Actor
- Years active: 1999–present

Reece Daniel Thompson (born 22 November 1988) is a Canadian actor. He started his acting career as a child actor by voice acting in several animated television series and minor roles on television shows before transitioning to films. His first major role came in the 2007 film Rocket Science. Thompson appeared in 2009's Assassination of a High School President, Afterwards, and 2010's Daydream Nation. He appeared as Craig in The Perks of Being a Wallflower (2012).

== Early life ==
Thompson grew up in a small town near Vancouver, British Columbia. He had always expressed an interest in becoming an actor to his parents and at a young age, Thompson, along with the rest of his family, began taking background roles in productions in Vancouver.

After the sixth grade, Thompson decided that he didn't want to continue going to school and convinced his mother to homeschool him. Soon after Thompson began attending an acting school. Thompson signed with an agent he was introduced to through the school and began attending auditions.

== Career ==
Thompson began his acting career with voice acting roles on animated television series and made small appearances in a few television series. He provided voices on Infinite Ryvius, MegaMan NT Warrior, InuYasha and Master Keaton. Thompson appeared in episodes of Jeremiah, Tru Calling and the mini-series Living With the Dead. His first major live-action television role came in 2002 when he played the character James Barns on Canadian children's television series I Love Mummy.

Thompson made his first film appearance with a small role in the 2003 film Dreamcatcher. In 2004, Thompson played the character of Jinto in three episodes of the science fiction television series Stargate Atlantis. Thompson also had small film roles in 2004's Superbabies: Baby Geniuses 2 and 2005's The Sandlot 2. In 2005, Thompson provided the voice for the character Simon Star in the animated television series Trollz. That same year, Thompson got a recurring role in the Canadian children's television series Zixx as Dwayne, one of the new main characters introduced in the show's second season. In 2008, Thompson reprised the role in the third season of the series. In 2006, Thompson made a guest appearance on an episode of Smallville and had a recurring role in the short-lived ABC Family series Three Moons Over Milford.

Thompson landed his first major film role as Hal Hefner, the protagonist in 2007's Rocket Science, a coming of age film about a stuttering boy who joins the high school debate team. The film was well-received, earning a Grand Jury Prize nomination at the Sundance Film Festival. Along with this, he started acting as Aero in the Geotrax animated series during this time.

Thompson's next film, Assassination of a High School President, was released straight to DVD on 6 October 2009. Along with this, he stars in the last Geotrax episode, "Steamer and Samuel save the day", which was released along with the 3 other Geotrax episodes on DVD. Thompson is also featured in Afterwards, a French-Canadian film production released in Europe in 2009.

In 2010, Thompson played a small-town stoner in Daydream Nation. That same year, Thompson appeared as the sensitive Marshall in Ceremony. In 2011, Thompson featured in the film Bloodworth.

In 2012, Thompson appeared in the film The Perks of Being a Wallflower, based on the popular novel of the same name.

== Personal life ==
He currently lives part-time in Vancouver, British Columbia, Canada. The other half of his time is spent living in Los Angeles, California.

== Filmography ==
Year	Title	Role
1999	Infinite Ryvius	Nicks Chaiplapat
2002	Jeremiah	Tommy
2002	I Love Mummy	James Barns
2003	MegaMan NT Warrior	Tory Froid
2003	InuYasha	Taromaru
2003	Master Keaton	Young Connelly
2003	Tru Calling	Kevin
2003	Dreamcatcher	Young Beaver
2003	The 4400	Greg Venner
2003	National Lampoon's Thanksgiving Family Reunion	Harley Snider
2004	Stargate Atlantis	Jinto
2004	Superbabies: Baby Geniuses 2	Kid
2005	Trollz	Simon
2005	The Sandlot 2	Singleton
2005	Finley the Fire Engine	Finley
2005	Muffin The Mule	Finley (narrator)
2005	Being Ian	Deepak
2005	Zixx	Dwayne
2006	Smallville	Young Geoffrey
2006	Three Moons Over Milford	Kurt
2006	Tom and Jerry Tales	Nibbles
2007	Rocket Science	Hal Hefner
2007	GeoTrax	Aero
2008	Class Savage	Marty
2008	The Story of Saiunkoku	Eigetsu/Yogetsu To
2009	Assassination of a High School President	Bobby Funke
2009	Afterwards	Jeremy
2010	Daydream Nation	Thurston
2010	Ceremony	Marshall Schmidt
2011	Bloodworth	Fleming Bloodworth
2012	Super Zeroes	Ty
2012	The Perks of Being a Wallflower	Craig
2013	April Apocalypse	Artie
2014	Bad City	Kyle Night-Bear
2015	Final Girl	Nelson
2018	Trial & Error	Mush Hammond
TBA	The Road Ahead	Tyler Nolan
TBA	The Fox Hunter	Cotton
TBA	Four Walls	Ben
TBA	29 Floors	Ted
