= Darlene Caamaño =

American film producer

- Born: Darlene Carolynne Caamaño; November 17, 1970 (age 55)
- Education: Azusa Pacific University
- Occupation: Film producer
- Spouse: Mark Stephen Loquet
- Children: Chloe Katherine Loquet

Darlene Carolynne Caamaño (born November 17, 1970) is a film producer, who has been involved in the production of such films as Dan in Real Life (2007), In the Valley of Elah (2007) and The Air I Breathe (2008). She has been president of NALA Films since 2005, for which role she was named 6th on the Hispanic Women "Power 25" list in 2007.

== Biography ==
Caamaño was born on November 17, 1970. She gained a B.A. in Communications ("with an emphasis in journalism") from Azusa Pacific University also studying at Fordham University and under the "media communications program Big deal." She married Mark Stephen Loquet on October 14, 2000, and the two have a daughter, Chloe Katherine Loquet, born on January 18, 2007, in Pasadena.

=== Early career ===
Caamaño's earliest entertainment role was as an assignment editor at Univision, Canal 34 in Los Angeles, "research[ing] and wr[iting] daily news storys (sic) for the evening news casts." Leaving news to work in film, she assisted producer Jay Polstein at Trimark Pictures on the 1997 Samuel L. Jackson-starring Eve's Bayou, and the two were instrumental in the early development of Frida with Salma Hayek, before the project was bought by Miramax.

She then became Vice President of Production at Sandra Rabins and Penny Finkelman Cox's DreamWorks production company Patchwork Productions, for whom she helped develop the animated features Chicken Run, Antz and Shrek, as well as developing a project for Jennifer Lopez called Mi Corazon, which was sold to New Line Cinema, for which company Caamaño next served as Senior Vice President of Production, for New Line-based El Norte Productions, founded by director Gregory Nava. With El Norte, she developed and sold Nava's Bordertown ("with Jennifer Lopez, Antonio Banderas and Martin Sheen") and a co-production with Dreamworks and Paramount Pictures: Killing Pablo by Mark Bowden. While with El Norte, she also supervised production of Nava's PBS series American Family.

=== D-No Entertainment ===
In September 2001, Caamaño-Loquet founded (with Noah Rosen) D-No Entertainment as "a management/production company dedicated to the representation of Latin talent, and the production of their material." The company represented several writers and filmmakers and developed a number of projects, including one for Disney about Peter Westbrook, the only black man "ever to win an Olympic medal for fencing."

D-No sold several projects by Latin writing team Lalo Lopez (Lalo Alcaraz) and Esteban Zul (of Pocho Productions) and both Caamaño-Loquet and Rosen shared executive producer credits on the 2007 film Dan in Real Life, which they developed and sold to Walt Disney Pictures. Starring Steve Carell and Juliette Binoche, the film was released by Touchstone.

== Nala Films ==
=== Voy ===
After D-No Entertainment, Caamaño-Loquet ran development and production for Voy LLC – "a digital media company focused on delivering culturally relevant entertainment" to English-speaking Latinos "and those discovering Latin culture through distribution vehicles ranging from broadband and wireless to broadcasting and DVDs." At Voy, she worked with Emilio Diez Barroso (the great-grandson Televisa-founder Emilio "el Tigre" Azcarraga) who joined the company as CEO of Voy Pictures and co-founder/president of its holding company, before founding NALA Films.

=== NALA ===
NALA Films, LLC is a "film development, production and financing company that leverages Latin American talent, resources and incentives to efficiently produce English language motion pictures and facilitate their worldwide distribution," based in Los Angeles. NALA Films was co-founded by Caamaño-Loquet with Emilio Diez Barroso, as a subdivision of NALA Investments (founded in 1999), in 2005.

Caamaño Loquet is President of NALA Films, her role entailing "develop[ing], supervis[ing] and produc[ing] the financing/production company's feature film and television slate." Diez Barroso and NALA financed their first film – The Air I Breathe – with money raised from private investors, "state subsidies" and "film subsidy programs" such as the fund run by the Mexico film institute Imcine. In addition, NALA took "a relatively conservative tack by shooting most pics in Mexico," where it "has fostered relationships with local state authorities." Diez Barroso, Caamaño-Loquet and Paul Schiff – who brought the production to NALA – produced, in association with Paul Schiff Productions, (whose Tai Duncan co-executive produced with Christopher Pratt).

NALA's remit to produce works with Latin American talent attempts "to finance three to four English-language pics per year in the $6 million to $12 million range." Ultimately, the first film to be released (in association with Warner Bros.) was the Oscar-nominated In the Valley of Elah, starring Tommy Lee Jones and Charlize Theron. Dan in Real Life (which Caamaño-Loquet developed earlier with Noah Rosen and their D-No Entertainment) followed the same year, in association with Buena Vista, while ThinkFilm released The Air I Breathe at various film festivals throughout late 2007, and debuted in the USA on limited release in January 2008, with After Sex (starring Jane Seymour) following a similar pattern.

=== Up-coming films ===
Caamaño Loquet is currently producing a number of NALA Films projects, including Mr. Burnout (set to be directed by Paul Dinello), Open Grave (to be directed by Eduardo Rodriguez), Night of Light (set to star Jason Patric, and be directed by Norberto López Amado) and Only Ever You (to be directed by Griffin Dunne). Also in production are La Magdalena – the company's first Spanish language production – and a more expensive project ($22m – $25m): the already-controversial "supernatural horror thriller" Shelter, starring Jonathan Rhys Meyers and Julianne Moore.
