= Paul Schiff =

American film producer

Paul Schiff is an American film producer.

== Early life and education ==
Schiff was raised in Bethesda, Maryland, one of three sons of Charlotte, a television and publishing executive, and Edward Schiff, a real estate lawyer. His brothers are actor Richard Schiff and talent manager David Schiff. He graduated in film studies from Wesleyan University, where his roommate was actor Bradley Whitford.

== Career ==
Schiff began his career as a documentary cameraman in his hometown of New York City before moving into directing for MTV, where he was on staff for four years during the early days of the fledgling cable channel. His success at the network led to an introduction to film executive Joe Roth, who would go on to become his mentor. Roth hired Schiff as associate producer on the boxing drama, Streets of Gold (1986), which was Roth's directorial debut, as well as his follow up Revenge of the Nerds II: Nerds in Paradise (1987). Schiff then became a vice president of production under Roth at Morgan Creek Productions, where he developed and supervised numerous projects, and co-produced the westerns Young Guns (1988) and its sequel, Young Guns II (1990). He also produced Roth's 1990 drama, Coupe de Ville.

After three years, Schiff secured an independent production deal at 20th Century Fox, where Roth was now chairman. Schiff spent seven years at the studio in a production deal, where he produced films including My Cousin Vinny, starring Joe Pesci and Marisa Tomei, The Vanishing, the American adaptation of George Sluizer's Dutch thriller; the Animal House-inspired campus comedy PCU; and the sci-fi thriller Ghost in the Machine.

After his stint at Fox, Schiff reteamed with Roth at Disney in a production deal, where he produced Wes Anderson's critically acclaimed film, Rushmore. The film won two Film Independent Spirit Awards—Best Director and Best Supporting Actor for Murray. Schiff continued his long-standing affiliation with Roth at the executive's new production firm, Revolution Studios, where he produced Maid in Manhattan, the hit romantic comedy starring Jennifer Lopez and Ralph Fiennes, and Mike Newell’s drama Mona Lisa Smile, starring Julia Roberts, Julia Styles and Kirsten Dunst. Between that, he worked briefly for Propaganda Films' film division between 2000 and 2001, before it was shut down.

Schiff's producing credits also include The Air I Breathe, Numb, Green Street Hooligans, the 2004 remake of the 1970s classic actioner, Walking Tall, Solitary Man, The Truth About Emmanuel, the ensemble comedy Spin, and the Alaskan-set thriller, Into the Grizzly Maze.

In 2015, Schiff completed My All American, an inspirational sports drama starring Aaron Eckhart and Robin Tunney.

== Personal life ==
Schiff's brother is actor Richard Schiff. Schiff and his family are Jewish.

== Filmography ==
He was a producer in all films unless otherwise noted.

=== Film ===
Year	Film	Credit
1986	Streets of Gold	Associate producer
1987	Revenge of the Nerds II: Nerds in Paradise	Associate producer
1988	Young Guns	Co-producer
1989	Renegades	Co-producer
1990	Coupe de Ville	
1990	Young Guns II	
1992	My Cousin Vinny	
1993	The Vanishing	
1993	Ghost in the Machine	
1994	PCU	
1995	Bushwhacked	
1998	Rushmore	
2000	Whatever It Takes	
2001	Black Knight	
2002	Maid in Manhattan	
2003	Mona Lisa Smile	
2004	Walking Tall	
2005	Green Street	Executive producer
2006	Date Movie	
2007	Epic Movie	
2007	Spin	
2007	The Air I Breathe	
2007	Numb	Executive producer
2009	Tenure	
2009	Solitary Man	
2013	The Truth About Emanuel	Executive producer
2015	Into the Grizzly Maze	
2015	Momentum	Executive producer
2015	My All American	
2016	Girl Flu.	Executive producer
2018	Proud Mary	
2018	Beast of Burden	
2018	How It Ends	
2019	Extracurricular Activities	Executive producer
2019	Fractured	
2021	Awake	
2024	The Inheritance	
TBA	Masterwork	
TBA	Youth	

Second unit director or assistant director

Year	Film	Role
1982	The House on Sorority Row	Assistant director
2002	Maid in Manhattan	Second unit director
2003	Mona Lisa Smile	Second unit director

As an actor

Year	Film	Role
1998	Rushmore	Waiter

Soundtrack

Year	Film	Role
1987	Revenge of the Nerds II: Nerds in Paradise	Producer: "No on Fifteen"

=== Television ===
Year	Title	Credit	Notes
1984	1st Annual MTV Video Music Awards	Feature producer	Television special
2010	Revenge of the Bridesmaids	Executive producer	Television film
2022	Super Pumped	Executive producer	
