= Emilio Diez Barroso =

Mexican-American businessman and philanthropist

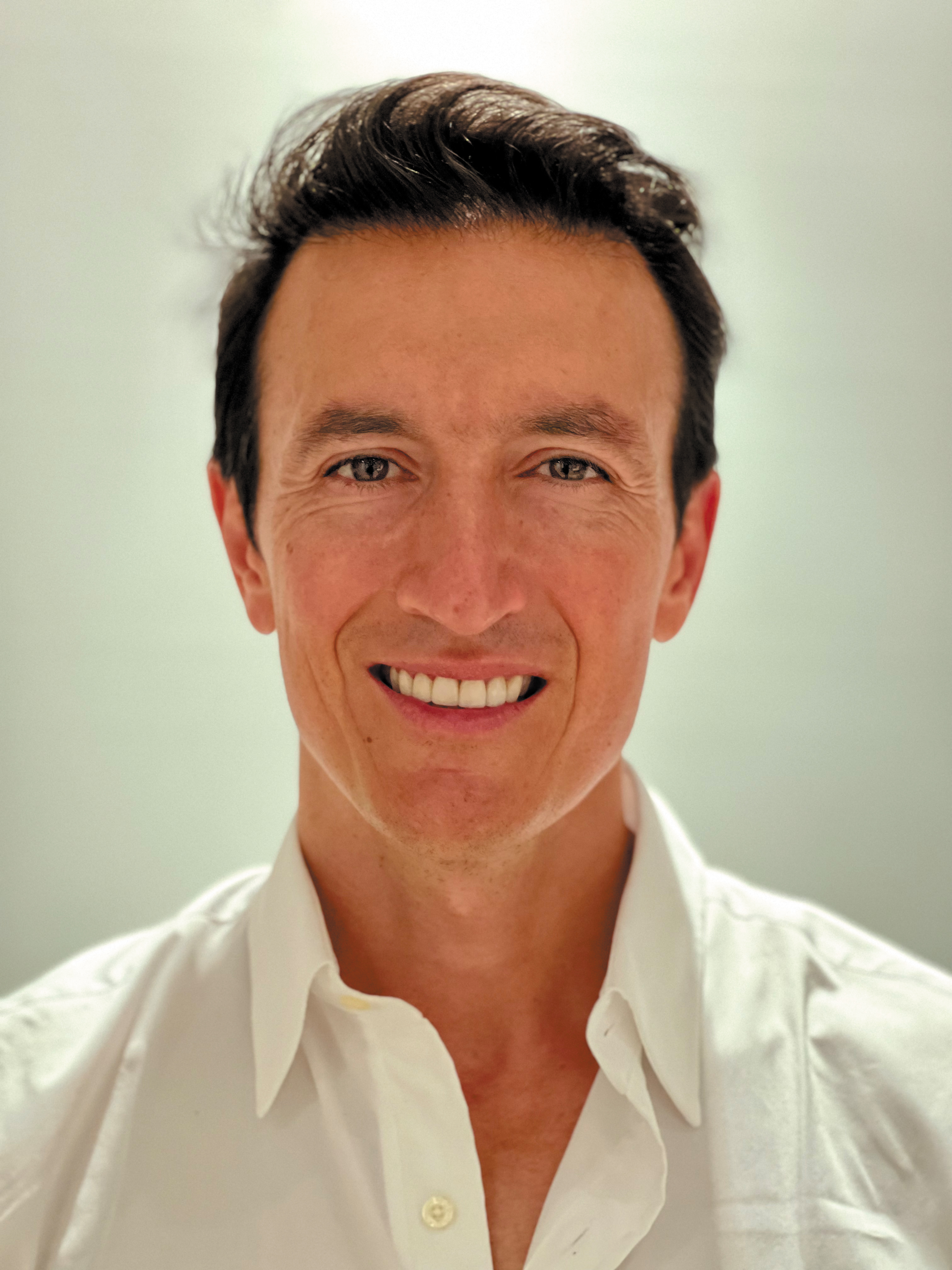
Emilio Diez Barroso - Headshot

Emilio Diez Barroso is a Mexican-American businessman, author and philanthropist. He is the Chairman and CEO of NALA Investments, a family office.

== Biography ==
Diez Barroso is the great-grandson of Emilio Azcárraga Vidaurreta, founder of Mexico's Televisa network. He studied Economics and Finance at Harvard University, I.T.A.M. and Boston Universities, and has an M.A. in Psychology from the University of Santa Monica with an emphasis on Consciousness Health and Healing.

He was Managing Director for Corporacion Triangulo, an investment corporation headquartered in Mexico and was named one of the 10 most powerful Latinos by Poder Magazine, and by The Hollywood Reporter.

Emilio is a founding partner of Bold Capital Partners, an investment partnership formed with Peter Diamandis and Singularity University.

== NALA Investments ==
In 1999, Emilio Diez Barroso founded NALA Investments ("North America Latin America"), and is currently its Chairman and CEO. It is a private investment holding company with operations across various industries including communications, energy, transportation, consumer products, real estate, technology and media, primarily in the United States and Latin America.

=== NALA Films ===
In 2005, Diez Barroso founded NALA Investments' production arm, NALA Films, based in Los Angeles.

== See also ==
- Volaris
- Televisa
- Univision
- NALA Films
- Azcárraga family
- Singularity University
- xprize
- Summit Entertainment
- Sasha Diez Barroso
