= Body swap appearances in film =

Storytelling device appearing in film

Body swaps have been a common storytelling device in fiction media.

This list features exchanges between two beings, and thus excludes:

- Similar phenomena of body hopping, spirit possession, transmigration, and avatars, unless the target being's mind is conversely placed in the source's body.
- Age transformations that are sometimes reviewed or promoted as body swaps, as in the movies Big and 17 Again
- Identity/role swaps, typically between clones, look-alikes, or doppelgängers;
- Characters with multiple personalities.

Title	Country	Director	Year	Characters	Method / notes	Reference
18 Again!	United States	Paul Flaherty	1988	Grandfather and grandson (Note: This title is debatable whether it is a true body swap as one of the recipients is in a coma or not accounted for in the story. * 18 Again * Dream a Little Dream)	Car accident	
Alison's Birthday	Australia	Ian Coughlan	1981	Young girl and old crone	Demonic ritual	
All of Me	United States	Carl Reiner	1984	An attorney and his female client	Mystic with soul transfer ability	
All Screwed Up	United States	Neil Stephens	2012	A nerdy teenage girl and a jock	Magic beetle bite	
Body Swap	United States	Timothy Morton	2019	An unemployed slacker and a workaholic woman	Electric shock	
Bogan	India	Lakshman	2017	An honest policeman and a charismatic criminal	An ancient manuscript allowing astral projection	
Chinna Vathiyar	India	Singeetam Srinivasa Rao	1995	Professor and student	Researching mantras that enable soul to move out of body / Same actor portrays both characters	
The Change-Up	United States	David Dobkin	2011	A lawyer and family man switches with his best friend who is an adult video actor.	Urinating at a magic fountain	
Daddy You, Daughter Me	South Korea	Kang Hyo-jin	2017	Won Sang-tae and Won Do-yeon		
Dame tu cuerpo (Give Me Your Body)	Mexico	Rafael Montero	2003	A guy's fiancée and best friend, who is a soccer coach	Wish during planetary alignment	
Dating the Enemy	Australia	Megan Simpson Huberman	1996	Boyfriend and girlfriend	Wish during full moon	
Detention	United States	Joseph Kahn	2011	Daughter in 2010 and mother in 1992	Rays from an alien spaceship	
Les Dissociés	France	Suricate	2015	People members of the "Suricate" group		
Dream a Little Dream	United States	Marc Rocco	1989	Teenager and older man	Meditation experiment and collision	
The Dude in Me	South Korea	Kang Hyo-jin	2019	Kim Dong-hyun and Jang Pan-soo		
Eine Frau namens Harry (A Woman Named Harry); Harry ou Harriet (Harry and Harriet)	Germany	Cyril Frankel	1990	Woman and Man	A wish for the devil	
Eine wie keiner (One Like No Other)	Germany	Marco Petry	2008	Boyfriend and girlfriend		
The Eye of Envy	United States	Harrish Ingraham	1917	Young blacksmith ("Ambition") and greedy old man ("Avarice")	Tree spirit called The Dream-Maker	
Family Switch	United States	McG	2023	Mother and daughter, Father and son and Baby and dog	an astrological reader	
Freakier Friday	United States	Nisha Ganatra	2025	Anna and Harper, Lily and Tess	Palm reading	
Freaky	United States	Christopher Landon	2020	Teenage girl and serial killer	Magical dagger	
Freaky Friday	United States	Gary Nelson	1976	Mother and daughter	Wish	
Freaky Friday	United States	Melanie Joy Mayron	1995	Mother and daughter	Magical amulets	
Freaky Friday	United States	Mark Stephen Waters	2003	Mother and daughter	Fortune cookies	
Freaky Friday	United States	Steve Carr	2018	Mother and daughter	Magical hourglass	
The Greeneyed Elephant	Denmark	Peer Guldbrandsen	1960	Sally and Lisa	Aztec elephant sculpture	
The Heckler	Australia	Ben Plazzer	2015	Steve (comedian) and Mike (heckler)	Toilet in comedy club plus hypnotism / Steve is a spirit when swapped	
Here Comes the Bride	Philippines	Chris Martinez	2010	Five different people	An accident on a magnetic hill during solar eclipse	
Here Comes the Groom	Philippines	Chris Martinez	2023	Various people	An accident on a magnetic hill during solar eclipse	
Hero in the Family	United States	Mel Damski	1986	Human astronaut and chimpanzee	Space crystal	
Hilda and the Mountain King	United Kingdom; Canada; United States	Andy Coyle	2021	Hilda and troll	Magic	
Hilfe, ich bin ein Junge (Help, I'm a boy!)	Germany	Oliver Dommenget	2002	Boy and girl	Magic spellbook	
Holiday Wishes	Canada	David Weaver	2006	Teenagers Britney (rich girl) and Rachel (foster kid)	Christmas wish	
The Hot Chick	United States	Tom Brady	2002	A popular high school cheerleader finds herself in a man's body.	Earrings	
I Are You, You Am Me	Japan	Nobuhiko Obayashi	1982	Teenage boy and girl	Fall down staircase	
Identity Theft	United States	James A. Ward	2009	A male lottery winner ends up swapping bodies with a beautiful female model who is in deep debt and is wanted by the police.	Spirit	
Intern (インターン!)	Japan	Akio Yoshida	2016	Male CEO and female intern	Magic	
It's a Boy Girl Thing	United Kingdom; Canada; United States	Nick Hurran	2006	Teenage boy and girl	Statue spell	
It's What's Inside	United States	Greg Jardin	2024	A group of friends	A suitcase device	
Ithihasa	India	Binu S. Kalady	2014	A petty thief ends up swapping bodies with a female software professional.	Ring	
Jumanji: The Next Level	United States	Jake Kasdan	2019	Main characters' avatars	Magical river	
Just Follow Law	Singapore	Jack Neo	2007	Supervisor and subordinate	Car accident	
Like Father Like Son	United States	Rod Daniel	1987	Father and son	Drinking a potion	
Love Switch	United States	John Lyde	2024	Unhappy married couple	Lightning strikes on house and hotel on 13th anniversary and 13th day	
The Machine (La Machine)	France	François Dupeyron	1994	Psychiatrist and serial killer	Experiment gone wrong with a mind-reading machine	
The Man Who Changed His Mind	United Kingdom	Robert Stevenson	1936	Four characters	Machine	
Moglie e marito	Italy	Simone Godano	2017	Wife and husband	Scientific apparatus	
Monkeybone	United States	Henry Selick	2001	Monkeybone ends up in an Stu’s body and Stu ends up in an organ donor’s body	Going back to Earth from Down Town.	
Mighty Mouse in the Great Space Chase	United States	Gwen Wetzler	1982	Harry the Heartless and Queen Pearlheart.	Harry's machine	
Never Say Die	China	Song Yang; Zhang Chiyu	2017	Allen Ai and Ma Xiao	Struck by lightning	
Nine Lives	United States	Barry Sonnenfeld	2016	A billionaire workaholic who has no time for his family, and a cat	Accident, fall from roof	
Nobody's Perfect	Hong Kong	Patrick Kong	2008	Alexis and Alex	statue	
Out	United States	Steven Clay Hunter	2020	Greg and his dog Jim	Wish	
Padakkalam	India	Manu Swaraj	2025	A student, a popular teacher and a former teacher of an engineering college	An ancient game like artifact	
Pizza Movie	United States	Brian McElhaney and Nick Kocher	2026	Jack and Lizzy, Montgomery and Lysander the Butterfly	Phase III of M.I.N.T.S drugs	
Po čem muži touží	Czech Republic	Rudolf Havlík	2018	Man and his former wife	Magic	
Pon un hombre en tu vida (Put a man in your life)	Spain	Eva Lesmes	1996	Male sports coach and female singer.	Accident	
Pokémon Ranger and the Temple of the Sea	Japan	Kunihiko Yuyama	2006	Jessie, James and Meowth; Ash and Jack Walker	Manaphy's Heart Swap attack.	
Prelude to a Kiss	United States	Norman René	1992	Mysterious old man and a bride	Kiss	
Runaway Brain	United States	Chris Bailey	1995	Mickey Mouse and a monster	Brain transplant machine	
A Saintly Switch	United States	Peter Bogdanovich	1999	National Football League quarterback and his wife.	Voodoo spell	
Scooby-Doo	United States	Raja Gosnell	2002	Shaggy, Fred, Daphne and Velma	Demons	
The Secret	France	Vincent Perez	2007	Mother and daughter	Car accident	
Se Eu Fosse Você (If I Were You)	Brazil	Daniel Filho	2006	Husband and wife	Arguing under stars	
Se Eu Fosse Você 2 (If I Were You 2)	Brazil	Daniel Filho	2009	Husband and wife	Arguing under stars	
Shrek the Third	United States	Chris Miller, Raman Hui	2007	Donkey and Puss in Boots	Side effect of teleportation spell	
Seitenwechsel	Germany	Vivian Naefe	2016	Husband and wife	Magic	
The Skeleton Key	United States	Iain Softley	2005	A young nurse with an older woman, who herself had been possessed by a woman who has swapped bodies twice before.	Hoodoo ritual	
Soul	United States	Pete Docter	2020	Joe ends up in Therapy Cat's body and 22 ends up in Joe's body	Going through portal to Earth at the same time	
Spellbound	United States	Vicky Jenson	2024	Flink and Bolinar.	Magic fob.	
Spiritwalker	South Korea	Yoon Jae-geun	2021	Kang I-an	Experimental drug "Ether-X"	
The Substance	France	Coralie Fargeat	2024	Elisabeth Sparkle and Sue	Use of The Substance	
Suitable Flesh	United States	Joe Lynch	2023	Elizabeth and Asa, Elizabeth and possessed Asa (Ephraim), Elizabeth and Ephraim, possessed Elizabeth (Ephraim) and Daniella	Demonic incantation	
The Swap	United States	Jay Karas	2016	Jack (hockey player) and Ellie (rhythmic gymnast)	A text message	
Swapped	United States	Nathan Greno	2026	Two enemies, a bird and a tiny mammal, team up after swapping bodies	Magic	
The Good, the Bart, and the Loki	United States	David Silverman	2021	Bart Simpson and Loki		
The Takeover	United States	Shaqueta Smith	2013	Black and white women who are best friends	Magical espresso	
Transformed	United States	Pamela Sutch (Note: Sutch also made a 2008 short film called "Genetics" which involved the body swap of two women)	2005	Hilda (female mad scientist) and Allen (guy), Vanessa (another swapper)	Mind-swapping device	
Turnabout	United States	Hal Roach	1940	Husband and wife	Magical statue. Based on the Book of the same name.	
French: L'un dans l'autre (In and Out)	France	Bruno Chiche	2016	Two couples are all great friends since a long time. Pierre is married to Aimée and Pénélope is engaged to Éric. However, Pierre and Pénélope are lovers and one day wake up with swapped bodies.	Magic	
Eine verflixte Begegnung im Mondschein	Germany	Dror Zahavi	2004	A man and a woman who had just met	Magic storm	
Vice Versa	United Kingdom	Peter Ustinov	1948	Father and son	Wish on magic stone	
Vice Versa	United States	Brian Gilbert	1988	Father and son; male and female thief	Ancient mystical skull	
The Villain	India	Prem	2018	Ramappa and Ram		
Was ist bloß mit meinen Männern los?	Germany	Reto Salimbeni	2002	Father and son	The son makes a wish to a CGI animated character who appears on his computer.	
What Do We See When We Look at the Sky?	Germany; Georgia	Alexandre Koberidze	2021	Lisa and other Lisa; Giorgi and other Giorgi	Cursed	
Wish Upon a Star	United States	Blair Treu	1996	Alexia (popular girl) and Hayley (geeky younger sister)	Wish on falling star	
Woke Up Like This	Philippines	John Elbert Ferrer	2017	Nando and Sabrina	Homeless man's curse	
Wonder Woman 1984	United States	Patty Jenkins	2020	Steve Trevor	Following his death, Steve Trevor is resurrected in another man's body after Wonder Woman inadvertently wishes on the Dreamstone. Most people perceive Trevor as his current body, with only Diana seeing him as his original self.	
Xchange	Canada	Allan Moyle	2000	Agent and terrorist leader	Technology	
山田ババアに花束を ''(Yamada Babā ni Hanataba o)'' (A bouquet for Mrs Yamada)	Japan	Toshio Ōi	1990	Strict female teacher of a conservative girls' high school swaps bodies with one of the female students.	Magic	
Your Name	Japan	Makoto Shinkai	2016	Mitsuha and Taki	Mitsuha's family and shrine history / Body swap also includes a time span of three years	
