= Little Secrets (2001 film) =

Children's film by Blair Treu

- Theatrical release poster
- Directed by: Blair Treu
- Written by: Jessica Barondes
- Produced by: Don Schain; Blair Treu; Jessica Barondes
- Starring: Evan Rachel Wood; Michael Angarano; David Gallagher
- Cinematography: Brian Sullivan
- Edited by: Jerry Stayner
- Music by: Sam Cardon
- Production company: Columbia TriStar Home Entertainment
- Distributed by: Samuel Goldwyn Films; TriStar Pictures
- Release dates: October 21, 2001 (Heartland); August 23, 2002 (limited)
- Running time: 96 minutes
- Country: United States
- Language: English
- Box office: $750,582

Little Secrets is a 2001 American comedy-drama family film directed by Blair Treu. It was produced by Columbia TriStar Home Entertainment and stars Evan Rachel Wood, Michael Angarano, and David Gallagher. The film follows Emily (played by Wood), a 14-year-old aspiring violinist who runs a secret-keeping booth in her neighborhood, offering the other children advice when they confess their secrets to her. Complicating Emily's life are her soon-to-be-born sibling and the two teenage brothers (Angarano and Gallagher) who move in next door. Emily soon finds herself unraveling under the weight of all the secrets, including one of her own.

The film is the second collaboration between Treu and writer Jessica Barondes, having previously teamed up for Disney Channel's Wish Upon a Star (1996). A proponent of family-oriented media, Treu wanted to make a grounded and character-driven film with a positive message, something he felt contemporary Hollywood was lacking. To prepare for what she considered her first family-friendly role, Wood spent two months learning how to mimic playing the violin. Little Secrets was shot on location in Salt Lake City in the summer of 2001, with local child actors rounding out the supporting roles. Utah-based composer Sam Cardon provided the score.

Little Secrets premiered at the Heartland Film Festival on October 21, 2001, under its original title Secret Keeper. It was also screened at the Salt Lake Children's Film Festival, before being released theatrically by the independent film company Samuel Goldwyn Films and TriStar Pictures on August 23, 2002. Wood's performance was widely praised, but while some critics found the film wholesome and sweet, others derided it as superficial and bland. Commercially, the film grossed $750,582 at the box office.

== Plot ==
Emily Lindstrom, a 14-year-old aspiring concert violinist, spends her summer practicing for an important audition to get into the local youth symphony orchestra in Salt Lake City. Due to Emily's knack for keeping secrets, she also runs a secret-keeping booth, charging the neighborhood children fifty cents for advice as they divulge their personal secrets to her. Emily herself is harboring a secret from her friends: that she is adopted. At home, Emily's parents are expecting a baby, having been unable to conceive a child of their own until now. Her parents' excitement over the baby leaves Emily feeling jealous.

Meanwhile, 12-year-old Philip Lenox and his family move in next door to Emily. While helping unpack, Philip accidentally breaks one of his father's valuable chess pieces and is caught by Emily as he attempts to hide it in the garden. Emily and Philip get off to a rocky start when she charges him fifty cents to keep this incident a secret from his parents, but Philip begins to take an interest in her after watching her play the violin. Emily invites Philip over for afternoon tea and they bond over having a shared secret after they accidentally break two irreplaceable china teacups. As Philip's crush grows, he begins taking piano lessons in an attempt to impress her.

David, Philip's 15-year-old brother, returns home early from tennis camp, having been expelled when he and other campers were involved in a car accident after having a few beers. Philip does not think it is a big deal, as David was not the driver and no one was legally drunk, but the woman in the other car was injured. Philip reveals David's secret to Emily in exchange for learning the meaning behind her secret greeting with her best friends. He is confused when Emily reacts angrily to what David did. Emily and David meet and are immediately attracted to each other, but she keeps her distance due to her knowledge of his secret, much to his suspicion. At the same time, Emily begins to lose her secret-keeping talent when some of her clients confess they have started committing immoral acts, including stealing and lying, on purpose. She begins to unravel under the pressure of keeping all these secrets and it affects her violin playing. Meanwhile, jealous of Emily's feelings for David over him, Philip opens his own secret-keeping booth when Emily's clients start to turn against her for her responses to their secrets.

At her mother's baby shower, David tries once again to talk to Emily and she reveals that she knows his secret. An angry David confronts Philip, who then reveals to Emily's best friends that she broke their secret greeting pact. After a heart-to-heart with her violin teacher Pauline, Emily resolves to stop keeping secrets. She goes to retrieve her violin that she left on the roof, but loses her balance and falls, resulting in her violin smashing, sending her to the emergency room, and causing her to miss her audition. Feeling guilty, the brothers go to the audition on her behalf and manage to get Emily a place in the youth orchestra by showing the panelists a tape of her playing the violin. While Emily is in the hospital, her mother also gives birth to her new sister whom Emily names Grace. Emily tells her friends that she is adopted and that her birth parents were killed by a drunk driver when she was 10 months old. She also reveals that the driver died in another accident, just over a year later. David finally understands why Emily was so upset at him and promises never to do something like that again. David also tells Emily that if she wants to be close to someone, she can't keep secrets from them. After she is released from the hospital, Emily and Philip reaffirm their friendship and he helps her close her secret-keeping booth for good. Philip gives Emily and David his blessing, and Emily and David share a kiss. The film ends with Emily receiving a new violin as a gift and viewing the outside neighborhood.

== Cast ==
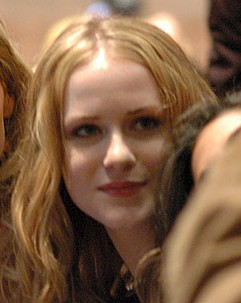
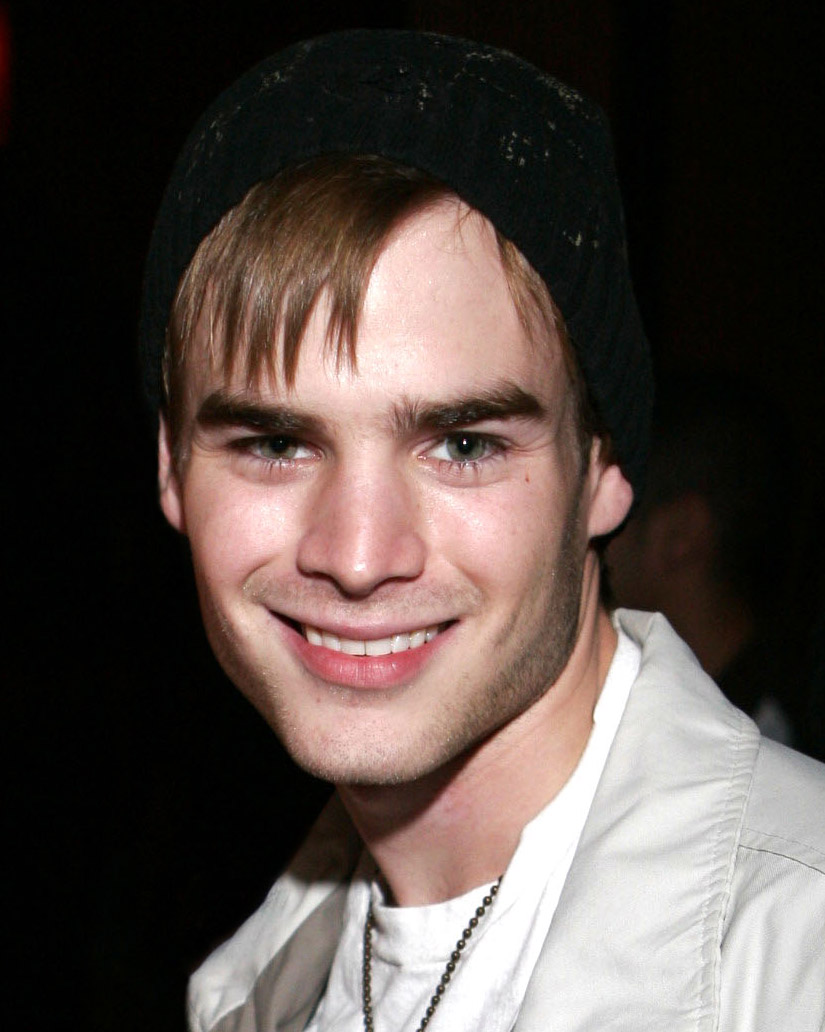
Evan Rachel Wood (pictured in 2005) and David Gallagher (2007)
- Evan Rachel Wood as Emily Lindstrom
- Michael Angarano as Philip Lenox
- David Gallagher as David Lenox
- Vivica A. Fox as Pauline
- Jan Broberg Felt as Caroline Lindstrom
- Rick Macy as Eddie Lindstrom
- Paul Kiernan as Don Lenox
- Tayva Patch as Elaine Lenox
- Micah Schow as Gregory
- Caitlin EJ Meyer as Isabelle
- Landon Kunzelman as Mikey
- Danielle Chuchran as Lea
- Haley McCormick as Jenny
- RuDee Lipscomb as Laurel
- Matthew Grace as Harold
- Joey Miyashima as Dr. Mezzie
- Janice Knickrehm as Mrs. Neiderhoffer
- Dustin Harding as Jordan

== Production ==
=== Development ===
Little Secrets was directed by Blair Treu and written by Jessica Barondes. It is Treu and Barondes' second collaboration, having previously made Wish Upon a Star (1996) together for the Disney Channel. The film was produced by Columbia TriStar Home Entertainment; Don Schain, Treu and Barondes served as producers. Both Treu and Barondes noted that there was no studio interference with the making of the film. The film was scored by Utah-based composer Sam Cardon.

As a filmmaker, Treu specialized in heartwarming family entertainment that is appropriate for children but still substantive. He believed that films like Little Secrets fill a gap in the market by appealing to a segment of the population that contemporary Hollywood has neglected. He added, "More than promoting this movie, I'm trying to promote this kind of movie." Barondes considered the themes in the film to be ubiquitous, saying, "I think the things I write about are pretty timeless. They could have been made in the '70s, '80s, and here we are in the 2000s, and hopefully it will work and will hang around."

Treu wanted the plot to be grounded and character-driven, and at the crux of the story is Emily grappling with the emotional weight and consequences of keeping so many secrets. Another subplot is the love triangle between Emily and the two brothers, Philip and David. Treu highlighted the friendship between Emily and Philip as his favorite storyline to develop. While he acknowledged that many of the film's young audiences were probably rooting for Philip to "get the girl" at the end, Treu felt it was more realistic that Emily would choose the older David.

=== Casting ===
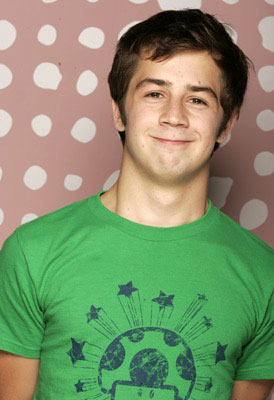
Michael Angarano was chosen by Treu to play Philip from the start.

In April 2001, The Hollywood Reporter reported that Wood was to star in the film. Treu had auditioned a few actresses before landing on her for the role of Emily. The actress was keen to join the production and work with a cast that was primarily children, noting that this was the first family-friendly project she had ever done. Wood described her character as passionate, especially in her dedication to the violin; while Treu said that Emily "likes to be in control" and "really enjoys being involved in the lives of her younger neighbors".

Wood appears in almost every scene in the film and Treu was impressed by her professionalism, recalling how she could shoot an emotional scene, take a break to attend school, then return to the set and pick up right where she left off in the scene. Because she did not know how to play the violin, Wood spent two months prior to filming learning how to mime playing the instrument along to the music. Even though the actual sound she produced did not matter, with Wood describing her violin playing on set as sounding like "fingernails on a chalkboard", she was surprised by how difficult it was to make her miming look realistic. Treu explained Wood's preparation process:

I shot a little instructional video with a violinist of the tune she would be playing in the film. We sent it along with the violin and the bow to mimic the action and the posture. [...] When she got to location in Salt Lake City, we did a little fine-tuning with an instructor to get the fingering down. But she was ready to go. She did her homework.

Meanwhile, auditions were not held for the role of Philip because Treu knew early on that he wanted Angarano for the part. Gallagher was cast as the "hunky" David, with Treu stating that the actor personified the "red-blooded all-American young man" and had a natural charisma that drew girls in. The director also noted that despite his young age, Gallagher had been acting for such a long time that he probably had the most on-set experience of the cast.

=== Filming ===
Little Secrets was shot on a small budget in the summer of 2001. Like the majority of Treu's previous productions, filming took place entirely on location in Salt Lake City, Utah, with specific locales including Downtown Salt Lake City and the area around Cottonwood Mall. Local child actors were cast in many of the supporting roles. For the neighborhood scenes in the film, Treu returned to the same location that he had previously shot Wish Upon a Star in. Treu favored this particular neighborhood due to its unique setting that consisted of newly built houses surrounded by old-growth trees, resulting in what he felt was a "magical quality". Moreover, the houses were relatively big and had high ceilings, making them ideal for filming.

Time was of the essence for the filmmakers, as the young cast was attending school and could only shoot for a few hours each day. To that effect, cinematographer Brian Sullivan set up shots rapidly. Treu credited Sullivan for the film's "crisp" and "colorful" visual quality, which he felt exuded a big-budget look. Despite the tight schedule, Treu wanted to maintain a relaxed working environment; actress Vivica A. Fox recalled the mood on set as being positive and wholesome, while Wood described the experience as "very laid back".

== Release ==
Originally titled Secret Keeper, the film premiered on October 21, 2001, at the Heartland Film Festival in Indianapolis. According to Heartland's president Jeff Sparks, it sold a record number of tickets to become the most popular film in the festival's history. The film, now retitled Little Secrets, went on to have its first screening in Utah on August 19, 2002, when it headlined the Salt Lake Children's Film Festival.

TriStar Pictures and Samuel Goldwyn Films agreed to give the film a limited theatrical release, and it opened in 366 theaters in the United States on August 23, 2002. In its debut weekend, it ranked 30th at the box office, grossing $191,747 with a per-screen average of $523. The film dropped out of the top-100 list in its third weekend until its last screening in 12 theaters in its fifth weekend, grossing $2,364 and ranking 127th. Overall, Little Secrets closed out a disappointing theatrical run grossing $405,792 domestically and $344,790 in other territories, for a worldwide total of $750,582.

It was released on VHS and DVD by Columbia-TriStar Home Entertainment on February 4, 2003, with bonus features including outtakes, a commentary track by Treu and Barondes, a "making-of" featurette, and the film's soundtrack on a separate CD.

== Reception ==
=== Critical reception ===
On the review aggregator website Rotten Tomatoes, 60% of 48 critics' reviews are positive, with an average rating of 5.5/10. The website's consensus reads: "Little Secrets is wholesome entertainment for the kids, but also rather bland." Metacritic, which uses a weighted average, assigned the film a score of 52 out of 100, based on 19 critics, indicating "mixed or average" reviews.

In The New York Times, Dave Kehr wrote that Wood has a screen presence that belies her young age. Overall, he concluded that "Little Secrets is a sunny, pleasant, squeaky-clean family film in which nothing surprising happens, and that is the point". People magazine found the film "borderline saccharine" despite a credible performance by Wood, while Moira Macdonald of The Seattle Times and David Noh of the Film Journal International likened it to an after school special. The News Tribune's Soren Andersen and The Indianapolis Star's Bonnie Britton were both full of praise for Wood, but noted that the plot was too contrived at times. Despite its flaws, Macdonald, Noh, Andersen, and Britton were all won over by the film's earnest, well-meaning intentions, which they felt were a respite from the other overly-commercialized or vacuous children's films.

In a negative review, The Hollywood Reporter's Frank Scheck found that the storylines play out in such a lazy and uninspiring manner, and that Wood's performance was the only noteworthy highlight in an otherwise boring film. Similarly, Variety's Scott Foundas commended Wood for "bringing as much charm and subtlety to the part as the one-dimensional script and clunky direction will allow". Foundas was also critical of the characterization of the young protagonists, who in his opinion must have been written by adults who have forgotten how actual children behave. Scheck was equally unimpressed with the adult cast, save for the "always lively" Fox. In contrast, The Salt Lake Tribune's Brandon Griggs felt the child characters were handled authentically and respectfully, while Crosswalk.com's Holly McClure appreciated the realistic depiction of the adult characters. Overall, McClure gave Little Secrets a positive review, with particular praise for its universal theme concerning secrets and lies.

Kevin Thomas of the Los Angeles Times bemoaned the superficial, idyllic world the story was set in, a trend he felt was all-too-common in the family genre. Yet despite its "greeting card look and feel", he thought the film's moral was intriguing and handled skilfully by the filmmakers. Thomas also praised the three teenage leads, although he quibbled that Wood was a little "actressy" at times. David Sterritt of The Christian Science Monitor concurred that the characters and settings were unrealistically wholesome, giving the film a sitcom-like quality. Even so, both Thomas and Sterritt recommended the film as satisfying entertainment for family audiences.

=== Accolades ===
Award	Category	Recipient	Result	Ref.
Heartland Film Festival	Crystal Heart Award	Little Secrets (as Secret Keeper)	Won	
Young Artist Award	Best Family Feature Film – Comedy	Little Secrets	Nominated	
Young Artist Award	Best Performance in a Feature Film – Leading Young Actress	Evan Rachel Wood	Nominated	
Young Artist Award	Best Performance in a Feature Film – Young Actress Age Ten or Younger	Caitlin EJ Meyer	Won	
