= Moonpools & Caterpillars =

American musical group

- Origin: Glendale, California, United States
- Genres: Alternative rock
- Years active: 1987–1997
- Members: Jay Jay Encarnacion; Kimi Ward Encarnacion; Tim DePala; Gugut Salgado

Moonpools & Caterpillars were a Filipino American alternative rock band based in California. They released three albums commercially, The Pink Album (self-released), Lucky Dumpling (1995, Elektra Records), and 12 Songs (self-released). Lucky Dumpling was produced by Richard Gottehrer. Their first album, The Pink Album, was a recording of a live show at Los Angeles's Whisky a Go Go, where many of their early shows were played. The band's music was featured in the movies The Baby-Sitters Club (1995), Wish Upon a Star (1996), and Frozen Stars (2003). Their song "Hear" was used in a 1995 VW Drivers Wanted commercial.

The "moonpools" portion of their name is in reference to Sealab 2020.

Lead singer Kimi Ward Encarnacion is known for being very energetic on stage. Jay Jay Encarnacion gave Moonpools & Caterpillars their distinct guitar sounds, which varied from ethereal chorusing to large, wall-of-sound distortion. Bassist Tim DePala and drummer Gugut Salgado were the other two members of the band. In part because three of the members of the band were Filipino, the band always had a presence on the Pinoy rock scene. In 2014, after a return to Whisky a Go Go, the band returned to the Philippines after a seventeen-year absence and were met by enthusiastic crowds.
