= The Paper Brigade =

- VHS cover
- Directed by: Blair Treu
- Written by: Denice K. Rice
- Produced by: David Anderson
- Starring: Kyle Howard; Robert Englund; Kylee Cochran; Chauncey Leopardi; Travis Wester
- Cinematography: Brian Sullivan
- Edited by: David Blangsted
- Music by: Ray Colcord
- Production company: Leucadia Film Corporation
- Distributed by: Leucadia Film Corporation
- Release date: September 25, 1996
- Running time: 105 minutes
- Country: United States
- Language: English

The Paper Brigade (also known as Gunther and the Paper Brigade) is a 1996 adventure/comedy film directed by Blair Treu. The film stars Kyle Howard and Robert Englund. The story follows a group of small-town paperboys who band together to prevent bullies from taking over their routes.

== Plot ==
Teenager Gunther Wheeler and his family move from New York City to the small and quiet suburb of Pleasant Valley, much to the disappointment of Gunther, who finds his new surroundings to be lame and uneventful compared to the city. Shortly after moving in, he meets his nerdy next-door neighbor Charlie Parker and the local paperboys. Charlie suggests to Gunther that he take over the delivery route from paperboy Leonard, who will be gone for the summer, but Gunther declines.

At the town mall, Gunther meets Allison Robbins, a gorgeous waitress whom he instantly develops a crush on. He also meets three local bullies, Chad and his buddies, Luke, and Wylee, who pick on Gunther.

Later on, he overhears the bullies trying to sell two concert tickets to see a famous band. Having just talked about the band with Allison and realizing it's the perfect way to impress her, Gunther offers to buy the tickets for $150 for the pair.

Gunther desperately tries to get the money, first from his dad who initially agrees but then changes his mind after Gunther's irresponsibility damages the pool, then from his little brother Andrew who says no. With nowhere else to turn, Gunther reluctantly calls Charlie about the paperboy job and swiftly accepts. Assuming the job will not be a demanding one, he carelessly tosses away a note Charlie gave him with helpful advice from Leonard.

On his first day on the route, Gunther runs into multiple unexpected nuisances, including pranks from bratty kids and an attack from a dog that jumps its fence. For his last delivery, Gunther decides to cut through a backyard, despite being warned by the milk man that the house belongs to Crazy Man Cooper, a former military serviceman who has a habit of attacking intruders. Cooper ambushes Gunther with a paintball gun and sics his flock of guard-geese on him. Gunther is about to quit when the recipient of his last delivery of the morning turns out to be Allison. Gunther delivers the paper to her personally and resolves to give the job another try.

The next day, Gunther shows up at the mall with the two tickets he bought from Chad and asks Allison out to the concert, which she accepts. Later on his route, he sees one of the customer's lawn is scattered with old paper deliveries. He goes up to the door to inform the resident of their papers. Ida Hansen, an elderly widow who loves baseball, kindly invites him in. Mrs. Hansen explains to Gunther that because of her old age and physical condition, it's hard for her to check the lawn and that Leonard was always nice enough to drop it in the mail slot. Gunther ensures her that he'll deliver her papers straight to her mail slot as well. Shortly after, Chad and his friends drive up beside Gunther while he's on his bike, demanding payment for the tickets. They force Gunther off the road and he crash lands into a swimming pool.

After collecting payments from the customers on his route, Gunther is told by Charlie that he makes most of his money from customer tips rather than the route itself and that there have been several customer complaints about Gunther's performance. A fed up Gunther, determined to improve his service, wakes up early and devises a plan to counter the obstacles along his route. He successfully tricks the unchained dog with food and outsmarts the tree house kids, even finally catching a customer who routinely stiffs him on payment. He also faces off against old man Cooper and wins the battle, earning Cooper's respect and gaining permission to pass through his yard. Gunther improves spectacularly in his job and attitude and gets tipped generously, earning more than enough money to pay off Chad for the tickets.

Seeing how much Gunther is earning, Chad decides to take over the paperboys' routes. Chad, Luke and Wylee descend upon the boys, stealing the papers and the addresses and delivery routes. They corner Gunther into giving up the newspapers by threatening to beat him up, and Gunther relents despite the protests of Charlie. Chad punches Gunther regardless. Charlie and the others are disappointed at Gunther for failing to stick up for them.

Later at the mall, Allison gives Gunther the cold shoulder. Having heard about what transpired with Charlie and the paperboys, she blows him off because of his cowardice to stand up to Chad and his gang.

The following day, Gunther's dad tells him how proud he is of his progress and improved work ethic and that he got a call from Mrs. Hansen asking how he's doing. Gunther visits with Mrs. Hansen, who says she misses him stopping by and asks why her papers haven't been coming through the mail slot lately. Gunther regretfully tells her she has a new paperboy. Gunther learns the late Mr. Hansen was the co-founder of the local paper, and that every year on the couple's anniversary, Mrs. Hansen goes to the stadium to watch a baseball game. However, she doesn't know if she'll be able to make the upcoming anniversary due to her bad knees and no one to go with.

Feeling remorse for his treatment of Charlie and the paperboys, Gunther gathers the group together and hatches a plan to sabotage Chad and his friends. Before the bullies can embark on their routes, the boys siphon gas from Chad's car, forcing the bullies to deliver the papers on bikes. They prank the bullies and lure them into Mr. Cooper's yard, where they are ambushed by the boys and Cooper himself with paintballs. The bullies are driven off by Cooper's guard-geese and the paperboys claim victory at getting their routes back.

Later, a limousine arrives at Allison's house and she is presented with a rose, but to her surprise she is greeted by Gunther's younger brother Andrew who explains to her that Gunther couldn't make the concert because of something important that came up. Allison gets Andrew to tell him where Gunther is, and she arrives at a baseball stadium where Gunther has accompanied Mrs. Hansen to the game for her anniversary. Touched by Gunther's maturity and selflessness, Allison gives Gunther a kiss.

== Cast ==
- Kyle Howard as Gunther Wheeler
- Travis Wester as Chad
- Chauncey Leopardi as Charlie Parker
- Ethan Glazer as Andrew Wheeler
- Matthew Ness as "Fish" Fisher
- Bibi Osterwald as Widow Hansen
- Robert Englund as "Crazy Man" Cooper
- Kylee Cochran as Allison Robbins
- Michael Peterson as Henry
- Matthew Best as Gus
- Michael Stephenson as Luke
- Christopher Marsh as Wylee
- Joey Miyashima as Milkman
- Braden Powell as Scooter
- Eean Crawford as Leonard
- Lincoln Anderson as Mickey
- Wes Brewer as Freddy
- Dennis Saylor as Mr. Litman
- Michael Flynn as Mr. Wheeler
- Suzanne Barnes as Mrs. Wheeler

== Production ==
Parts of the film were shot in Salt Lake City, Utah.

== Release ==
The film was produced by the Utah-based company Leucadia Film Corporation and was released on video on February 5, 1997. It was frequently aired on HBO and the Disney Channel.
