= The Brainiacs.com =

- DVD cover
- Directed by: Blair Treu
- Written by: Jeff Phillips and Roger Mende & Kathleen Lohr (Story); Jeff Phillips (Screenplay)
- Produced by: Roger Mende; Mark Headley
- Starring: Michael Angarano; Kevin Kilner; Kevin Jamal Woods; Florence Stanley; Dom DeLuise; Vanessa Zima
- Cinematography: Brian Sullivan
- Edited by: Joy Zimmerman
- Music by: Tim Jones
- Production companies: PorchLight Entertainment; Videal GmbH
- Distributed by: Monarch Home Video; PorchLight Entertainment
- Release date: December 22, 2000
- Running time: 101 minutes
- Country: United States
- Language: English

The Brainiacs.com is a 2000 American direct-to-video family comedy film, starring Michael Angarano and Kevin Kilner. The screenplay was written by Jeff Phillips and the film was directed by Blair Treu.

== Plot ==
To achieve his goal of more time with his widowed, workaholic father David, Matt Tyler and his best friend Danny decide to try to buy his business, Tyler Toys. Matt attempts to open a bank account at the Sunnyvale bank, which is owned by fellow businessman Ivan Lucre. Though he quickly gains the admiration of loan officer Kara Banks, Matt's meager funds do not meet the minimum deposit requirement. When his older sister Kelly confidentially reveals she is working on a groundbreaking artificial intelligence computer chip, Matt and Danny create The Brainiacs.com and a fictional company called Global Consolidated Resources, which offers shares of stock as collateral for $1 of investment in the microchip.

The returns total $4 million, and the amount of money Matt and Danny have accumulated requires Matt to reveal his plan to Kara, who is deeply sympathetic to the boys' plan. After they leave, David walks in to apply for a loan to jump-start Tyler Toys' expansion program, which will sell the new Hairball toy internationally. After David and Kara disagree over procedural issues such that the loan does not go through, Ivan calls Kara into his office to brief her of his plan. Lucre instructs Kara to loan David as much money as possible, such that Tyler Toys will either succeed and give him profits, or fail and allow the bank to cheaply buy Tyler Toys and its assets. Additionally, his assistant Ms. Arbitrage, who worked with Tyler for Hairball orders overseas, cancels the next set of orders. The loan quickly maxes out to $500,000, which the financially struggling company cannot produce. Lucre's children Chet and Russell heard about Matt's "project" in economics class and ruthlessly bully Matt, letting him know that they are also out for blood. Matt buys a majority share in Tyler Toys, and as the new boss "Mr. Chips" (animated by a computer) institutes lax work regulations and gives his father a vacation. Lucre hires his nephew Miles to spy on David and his family in an attempt to weed out the mysterious competitor, and Chet and Russell attempt to attack Matt and Danny at school but are outsmarted.

Although David's vacation time allows him to spend quality time with his family, the downside is that Kelly is so happy spending time with her father that she completely loses focus on the computer chip, which has hit a major bug that may take weeks to solve – weeks that Tyler Toys does not have. When David returns to work, Mr. Chips assigns him to test Tyler Toys' entire product line, which wakes him up to the reality that the company has lost its magic. Further complications ensue when Mr. Toller of the Federal Trade Commission arrives at the Tyler house to investigate Global Consolidated Resources and its "super-chip" for potential fraud. Matt stalls Toller and asks Kara for help; she agrees to stall Toler only if Matt comes clean with his father.

On a camping trip the next day, Matt reveals to his father and sister that he bought the company and why; Kelly rounds on her brother, who is forced to admit that he betrayed their confidence. Even worse, Miles has recorded the entire conversation and reports back to his uncle. When David returns to Tyler Toys headquarters, he receives financial and emotional blows: Ms. Arbitrage was working for Lucre, and the company is scheduled to be auctioned off at an official hearing at noon the next Monday unless the $500,000 is repaid by then. Kara walks in on Ivan, Miles and Ms. Arbitrage toasting their victory and quits her job in disgust. In desperation, all of Tyler Toys works towards a functioning microchip before Monday, but its initial prototype fails to work. Kara assists David and Matt in compiling their financial records, but the team can only turn up $100,000 owed to them.

On Monday morning, Matt accidentally finds an abandoned steel box containing stock certificates. He immediately meets with his grandmother Miriam, who has been in town since Tyler Toys was bought out and drives the auction following the hearing up to $2 million, to everyone else's surprise. When Ivan demands that Miriam corroborate her bidding, she hands the stock to the judge, who promptly appraises it at $10 million. Miriam nonchalantly repays Lucre's loan and buys Tyler Toys, closing the case; the celebration is punctuated by David and Kara sharing a kiss. Although Miriam sets ground rules for her son before restoring the company's proper ownership, the ordeal has taught David his lesson. In revenge, Chet and Russell ambush Matt and blackmail him into signing over control of Global Consolidated Resources; Matt capitulates as he sees Mr. Toller drive up and then directs the FTC executive to the company's new owners, who are assessed a fraud penalty of $500,000 when they confess to not having the chip.

Despite the loss of the stock, Tyler Toys survives long enough for the microchip to be completed, which sees its first use metamorphosizing the Hairball into the intelligent, interactive Smartball; it becomes a global sensation that sells over a billion units and the signature item of Tyler Toys. Testing is underway for the Smartboard, a skateboard with a smart-chip implant, as the movie ends with a shot of the company billboard.

== Cast ==
- Michael Angarano as Matt Tyler
- Kevin Kilner as David Tyler
- Kevin Jamal Woods as Danny
- Vanessa Zima as Kelly Tyler
- Florence Stanley as Miriam Tyler
- Dom DeLuise as Ivan Lucre
- Kurt and Cody Wetherill as Chet and Russell Lucre
- Alexandra Paul as Kara Banks

== Reception ==
Richard Kuipers from Urban Cinefile wrote: ""The description 'family comedy' can be a signal to strike fear into the hearts of both youngsters and parents. Everyone who has cringed through wholesome entertainment knows the dangers of being assaulted by squeaky clean characters living in Leave It To Beaver- inspired worlds of sickly artificiality. Luckily that's not the case with The Braniacs.com, a pleasant little charmer for kids to enjoy and not feel like they're being talked down to."
