= Meet the Mormons =

- Theatrical release poster
- Directed by: Blair Treu
- Produced by: Jeff Roberts
- Cinematography: R.J. Hill; Brian Sullivan
- Edited by: Wynn Hougaard
- Music by: Sam Cardon
- Production companies: Excel Entertainment; The Church of Jesus Christ of Latter-day Saints
- Distributed by: Purdie Distribution
- Release date: October 10, 2014
- Running time: 78 minutes
- Country: United States
- Language: English
- Box office: $6 million

Meet the Mormons is a 2014 American documentary film directed by Blair Treu and produced by the Church of Jesus Christ of Latter-day Saints (LDS Church). The film documents the lives of six devout Mormons living in the United States, Costa Rica, and Nepal. The LDS Church donated all net proceeds from the theatrical release of the film to the American Red Cross.

== Production ==
The film was originally designed for viewing in the Legacy Theater in the Joseph Smith Memorial Building in Salt Lake City, but after screenings with test audiences, LDS Church leadership decided to release the film first in theaters across the United States. According to Jeffrey R. Holland, the film is "not a proselytizing effort but informative" and is an "opportunity to share who Mormons really are." The film was financed and distributed by the LDS Church, a first for the church. It is shot in documentary format and was translated into 10 languages.

American singer-songwriter and actor David Archuleta sang the track "Glorious" for the film.

== Featured people ==
The film features Jermaine Sullivan, "The Bishop", and his family. Sullivan is an African-American who is an academic counselor at the University of Phoenix. He was bishop of a ward in Atlanta, Georgia, when the film was made, and now serves as a stake president. The film also covers Sullivan's wife and children. Darius Gray was among the associates of Sullivan interviewed.

"The Coach", Ken Niumatalolo, head football coach at the United States Naval Academy.

"The Fighter", Carolina Muñoz Marin, an MMA fighter from Costa Rica who had a chance to go pro international, but she and her husband decided it would separate their family too much.

"The Humanitarian", Bishnu Adhikari, a man from Nepal, with a degree in engineering who is the country director for Choice Humanitarian in Nepal. The organization works to improve the living situation in rural parts of Nepal.

"The Candy Bomber", Gail Halvorsen, the United States Air Force pilot best known as the "Berlin Candy Bomber" who dropped candy to children during the Berlin airlift from 1948 to 1949.

"The Missionary Mom", Dawn Armstrong, her story is chronicled from the birth of a son when she was a teenager, abandonment by his biological father, meeting her current husband - who had both her eldest son and her deceased second-eldest son sealed to him when they were married in the temple, to her eldest son leaving to serve a mission.

== Release ==
Meet the Mormons was released on October 10, 2014, in the United States by Purdie Distribution and Excel Entertainment. The LDS Church donated all net proceeds from the theatrical release of film to the American Red Cross. Beginning January 2015, the LDS Church began showing the film in all of its visitors' centers and historical sites.

== Theme song ==
The theme song from the documentary was "Glorious" originally written and recorded by Stephanie Mabey. It is found in her album Wake Up Dreaming released on August 1, 2012.

For the film version, the song was sung by David Archuleta, a finalist in season 7 of American Idol. The Archuleta version was released as a single in English language accompanied by a music video. An alternative Spanish version as "Glorioso" was also released again sung by Archuleta.

== Reception ==
On review aggregation website Rotten Tomatoes the film has an approval rating of 18% based on 11 reviews, with an average rating of 5.2 out of 10. On Metacritic the film has a score of 29 out of 100 based on reviews from 6 critics, indicating "generally unfavorable reviews".

The film has been criticized as "propaganda" or an "infomercial". Critics felt the documentary lacked information about Mormon history, its tenets, and its controversies. Producer Jeff Roberts responded to these reviews saying, "Most reviewers wanted the movie to be controversial, but we wanted to tell stories about those who make up our base." Some reviewers praised the movie for its "slick" cinematography.

The film grossed $2,509,808 in its opening weekend, placing it outside the top 10. As of October 2015, it is listed 34th in revenue-producing documentary films.

== See also ==
- List of films of The Church of Jesus Christ of Latter-day Saints
