= Travis Wester =

American actor (born 1977)

- Born: October 8, 1977 (age 48); United States
- Occupation: Actor
- Years active: 1996–present
- Notable work: Jamie in EuroTrip

Travis Wester is an American actor. He was born on October 8, 1977 in the United States.

== Career ==
An actor in American film and television, Wester's first role was in 1996's The Paper Brigade. Portraying Jamie in 2004's EuroTrip, Rotten Tomatoes called this his best-known performance. Wester has also performed in Boston Public, Scrubs, Felicity, ER, and Days of Our Lives.

=== Performance credits ===
Film performances
Year	Title	Role	Citation(s)
1996	The Paper Brigade	Chad	
2001	Spring Break Lawyer	Leon Hornberger	
2002	Teddy Bears' Picnic	Denny O'Leary	
2004	EuroTrip	Jamie	
2005	All Souls Day	Joss	
2007	Kush	Ash	
2008	Stone & Ed	Ed Schwartz	
2011	God Bless America	Ed	
2012	Zombie Hamlet	Osric Taylor	

Television performances
Year(s)	Title	Role	Episode(s)	Citation(s)
1996–1997	Mr. Rhodes	Ethan		
1996	Beverly Hills, 90210	Austin Sanders		
1997 & 2001	Dharma & Greg			
1997	Moloney			
1997	The Visitor			
1998	George & Leo			
2001	Spyder Games			
2001	Scrubs	David Morrison	"My Old Lady"	
2002	Six Feet Under	Henry		
2005	Jake in Progress			
2005	Night Stalker	Devan Harvey		
2006	CSI: Crime Scene Investigation		"Killer"	
2008–2014	Supernatural	Harry Spangler	5 episodes	
2009	Cold Case		"Hoodrats"	
2010	Bones	Jasper Alman		
2010	Justified			
2010	Ghostfacers	Harry Spangler	All 10 episodes	
2014	NCIS: Los Angeles	Peter Weber	"Humbug"	
2017	Code Black	Victor		
2017	NCIS	Miles Higgins	"Exit Strategy"	
