= Lucky Dumpling =

Studio album by Moonpools & Caterpillars
- Released: 1995
- Studios: Dreamland, West Hurley, New York; Bearsville, Bearsville, New York
- Genres: Pop, power pop
- Label: EastWest
- Producers: Richard Gottehrer, Jeffrey Lesser

Moonpools & Caterpillars chronology
| The Pink Album (1995) | Lucky Dumpling (1995) | 12 Songs (1998) |

Lucky Dumpling is an album by the Filipino American band Moonpools & Caterpillars, released in 1995. The album's first single was "Hear". The band supported the album with a North American tour.

== Production ==
Recorded in Woodstock, New York, the album was produced by Richard Gottehrer and Jeffrey Lesser. The lyrics were written by frontwoman Kimi Ward Encarnacion; the band considered its music to be upbeat and positive. The album cover was designed by John Heiden and the band. "Trampling Rose" was influenced by country music, employing banjos and yodels.

== Critical reception ==
Professional ratings
Review scores
| Source | Rating |
|---|---|
| AllMusic | 4/5 stars |
| Daily Breeze | 3.5/4 stars |
| Houston Press | 3/5 stars |
| Knoxville News Sentinel | 2/4 stars |
| The San Diego Union-Tribune | 2.5/4 stars |

Trouser Press called the album "absolutely wonderful," writing that, "behind Utah native Kimi Encarnacion’s strong, careening vocals—a sweetheart of falsetto yodels, yelps, nonsense syllables, whoops and delicate caresses—subtle power guitarist Jay Jay Encarnacion (her husband) and the rhythm section timewarp four decades of electric pop for an individualized set of enticing flavors." The Salt Lake Tribune deemed it "a pleasant pop surprise," and praised the "delightfully crafted" songs "Sunday" and "Hear". The Daily Breeze thought that the album "spills over with insidiously catchy songs put across with an intoxicating blend of power, exuberance and clarity." The Houston Press noted the "half-skewed, mildly impressionistic power-pop" and "peppy, well-structured songs."

The Colorado Springs Gazette-Telegraph complimented Encarnacion's "lovely voice that rises, falls and whoops in ways that might be embarrassing coming from lesser mouths." Newsday called Lucky Dumpling "1995's most exhilarating and delightful alternative pop album so far," writing that the album "is a giddy, thoughtful blast of joyful melodies, an over-the-counter mood elevator driven by alternately pristine and buzzing guitars and Kimi Encarnacion's eccentric vocals, singing her bemused, uplifting lyrics." The Los Angeles Times considered the "excellent" album to be "winsome, folk-flavored pop-rock with a knack for catchy melodies and soaring harmonies." The Knoxville News Sentinel concluded that "Hear" was the only truly great song on the album.

AllMusic wrote that "the songs range from the sweet power pop of 'Ren', which has a light, jazz-inflected bridge, to the kinetic drive and drumming of 'Colossal Youth', to the tribal beat and chants that underpin the breezy 'Sundays'."

== Track listing ==
| No. | Title | Length |
|---|---|---|
| 1. | "Hear" |
| 2. | "Ren" |
| 3. | "Soon" |
| 4. | "Trampling Rose" |
| 5. | "Colossal Youth" |
| 6. | "Summertime" |
| 7. | "Heaven" |
| 8. | "Sundays" |
| 9. | "Traveling Song" |
| 10. | "The Buick" |
| 11. | "Koo Koo Koo" |
| 12. | "Jubilee" |
| 13. | "Crazy Old World" |

== Personnel ==
- Tim Depala – bass
- Jay Jay Encarnacion – guitars
- Kimi Ward Encarnacion – vocals
- Gugut Salgado – drums
