= Just Friends =

2005 film by Roger Kumble

- Theatrical release poster
- Directed by: Roger Kumble
- Written by: Adam 'Tex' Davis
- Produced by: Chris Bender; J.C. Spink; Michael Ohoven; William Vince; Bill Johnson
- Starring: Ryan Reynolds; Amy Smart; Anna Faris; Christopher Marquette; Chris Klein
- Cinematography: Anthony B. Richmond
- Edited by: Jeff Freeman
- Music by: Jeff Cardoni
- Production companies: Cinerenta; Inferno Distribution; BenderSpink; Cinezeta Internationale; Infinity Media
- Distributed by: New Line Cinema
- Release date: November 23, 2005
- Running time: 94 minutes
- Countries: United States; Canada; Germany
- Language: English
- Box office: $51 million

Just Friends is a 2005 Christmas romantic black comedy film directed by Roger Kumble, written by Adam 'Tex' Davis and starring Ryan Reynolds, Amy Smart, Anna Faris, Chris Klein and Christopher Marquette. The plot focuses on a formerly obese high school student (Reynolds) who attempts to free himself from the friend zone after reconnecting with his best friend (Smart), with whom he is in love while visiting his hometown for Christmas from his music label job. The film revolves around humorous observation of strictly platonic relationships as "just friends" or "just as best friends".

Davis's screenplay for Just Friends was initially optioned in 2001 by New Line Cinema, and was inspired by numerous elements of his own life. Principal photography took place in early 2005 in Los Angeles as well as Regina and Moose Jaw, Saskatchewan, Canada. The film was an international co-production between the United States, Canada, and Germany.

Just Friends was released on November 23, 2005, and grossed over $51 million. It received mixed reviews from film critics, but has developed a cult following in the years since its release.

== Plot ==
In 1995, obese high school senior Chris Brander is secretly in love with his classmate and best friend Jamie Palamino. Confessing his feelings by writing in her yearbook, he attends their graduation party. As he returns Jamie's yearbook, it is swapped by her ex-boyfriend, Tim, who reads the declaration aloud to everyone, humiliating Chris. After kissing him on the cheek, Jamie admits she does not reciprocate his affections. He leaves the party in tears, planning to never return, and vows to be more successful than everyone else.

Ten years later, a womanizing Chris has lost weight and lives in Los Angeles as a successful music executive and artist manager. Before Christmas, his boss KC asks him to accompany emerging singer Samantha James to Paris so she signs with their label, and Chris reluctantly complies. While she wants a relationship with him, he has no interest after their only date previously led to his hospitalization. On the way to Paris, Samantha accidentally sets her private jet on fire, causing an emergency landing in New Jersey, near Chris' hometown.

Chris takes Samantha to his childhood home for the night and re-engages with his teenage past, including his unresolved feelings for Jamie. She meets his 18-year-old brother Mike, a fan of Samantha, and mother Carol. At a bar, he also sees Jamie, working as a bartender to pay for graduate school for teaching. Chris asks Mike to keep Samantha busy during his date with Jamie, but realizing their platonic friendship is important to him hampers his plan for them to have sex. During a friendly ice skating "day date", Chris is taken away in an ambulance after injuring himself during a hockey game. At the scene, Jamie is reunited with Dusty Dinkleman, a paramedic and former high school classmate who was also in love with her.

Realizing Dusty only wants revenge sex with her, Chris tries to warn Jamie but instead attacks Dusty in front of her. She refuses to listen when he tries to explain. Consequently, he gets drunk and goes to Jamie's bar, finding her there with Dusty. When she gently declines Dusty's sexual advances, he storms out. Chris and Jamie get into another fight, where he blames her for keeping him in the friend zone and says she will never amount to anything with the phrase "have fun being the girl who peaked in high school". Furious, Jamie strikes Chris and he is tossed out.

Upon returning to Los Angeles and rejecting Samantha's advances again, Chris realizes that Jamie is his true love. He returns to New Jersey, apologizes to Jamie, declares his love, says that he wants to marry and have babies with her, and they kiss.

== Cast ==
- Ryan Reynolds as Chris Brander
- Amy Smart as Jamie Palamino
- Anna Faris as Samantha James
- Chris Klein as Dusty "Dusty Lee" Dinkleman
- Christopher Marquette as Mike Brander
- Julie Hagerty as Carol Brander
- Stephen Root as KC
- Fred Ewanuick as Clark
- Amy Matysio as Darla
- Barry Flatman as Mr. Palamino
- Maria Arcé as Athena
- Ty Olsson as Tim
- Todd Lewis as Kyle
- Ashley Scott as Janice
- Trenna Keating as Nancy
- JJ Elliott as Movie Goer
- Tina Cerato as Movie Goer
- Amanda Park as Dental Assistant

Alanis Morissette, then Reynolds' fiancée, made a cameo appearance as "herself" as a former client of his character. This came about when the casting director said "We need an Alanis Morissette type" and Reynolds said he knew someone who would fit. This scene was deleted, however, and is only available on the DVD.

== Production ==
=== Development ===
Adam 'Tex' Davis wrote the screenplay for Just Friends based on a platonic friendship he had with a young woman in college. The majority of the screenplay, including the familial relationships and New Jersey setting, were drawn from Davis's own life. Davis's manager, Chris Bender, presented the screenplay to New Line Cinema executive Richard Brenner, who was impressed by the screenplay and optioned it for a feature film around 2001. Around 2004, Roger Kumble was hired to direct the project. The film was an international co-production, produced by Bender's production company Benderspink, as well as the German-based Cinerenta and the Canadian company Cinezeta.

=== Casting ===
Prior to Reynolds's casting as the lead, Jimmy Fallon and Bradley Cooper were considered for the role of Chris Brander. Anna Faris was cast as Samantha James; Kumble recalled of casting her: "I met with [Anna] and we grab a coffee and she asks, 'What is this character in your mind?' And Tex wrote it, but at the time, it’s Lindsay [Lohan] and Paris [Hilton] and all of them and Britney [Spears] and throw in some amphetamines and put it in a blender and that’s Samantha James. And she totally got it." Hilton herself had auditioned for the role of James at one point.

Chris Klein was cast in the role of Dusty Dinkelman based on his comedic performances in Election and American Pie (both 1999).

=== Filming ===
Just Friends was shot in Los Angeles and parts of Regina and Moose Jaw, Saskatchewan. According to Davis and Kumble, Reynolds and Faris improvised during the filming of many of their scenes together.

== Music ==
Just Friends

Soundtrack album by Various artists
- Released: November 22, 2005
- Genres: Alternative rock; indie rock; rhythm and blues
- Label: New Line

A soundtrack was released November 22, 2005 on New Line Records.

Track listing

1. Ben Lee – "Catch My Disease"
2. Fountains of Wayne – "Hackensack"
3. Rogue Wave – "Eyes"
4. Anna Faris (as Samantha James) – "Forgiveness"
5. Brendan Benson – "Cold Hands (Warm Heart)"
6. Robbers on High Street – "Big Winter"
7. The Sights – "Waiting on a Friend"
8. Reed Foehl – "When It Comes Around"
9. The Lemonheads – "Into Your Arms"
10. 'Just Friends' Holiday Players – "Christmas, Christmas"
11. "Dusty 'Lee' Dinkleman" – "Jamie Smiles"
12. Anna Faris (as Samantha James) – "Love from Afar"
13. Jeff Cardoni – "Just Friends Score Medley"
14. All-4-One – "I Swear"
15. Carly Simon – "Coming Around Again"

=== Original songs performed in the film ===
1. "Forgiveness", performed multiple times by Anna Faris.
2. "Jamie Smiles", performed multiple times by Chris Klein
3. "Love from Afar", performed by Anna Faris and Renee Sandstrom
4. "Just a Guy", performed by Anna Faris (only on the Alternate Ending)

Most songs in the film were written by Adam Schiff, except "When Jamie Smiles", which was written by H. Scott Salinas.

The orchestral score was written by Jeff Cardoni, and orchestrated by Stephen Coleman and Tony Blondal.

== Release ==
Just Friends was released theatrically in the United States on November 23, 2005, the day before Thanksgiving.

=== Home media ===
New Line Home Entertainment released Just Friends on DVD on March 7, 2006. The initial DVD sales for the film totaled $26,618,828.

In Canada, Alliance Atlantis released a Blu-ray edition on February 2, 2010. The Warner Archive Collection released the film on Blu-ray in the United States on April 8, 2025.

== Lawsuit ==
In 2011, the film's Canadian financiers sued its international distributor Inferno Distribution, alleging producer William Vince (who died in 2008) had absconded with $3.6 million in Canadian tax shelter credits from the province of Saskatchewan, where much of the film was shot, and that Inferno failed to pay back their promised sum of $7,694,100. Cinezeta Internationale had helped finance the film with $9 million in equity funding as well as an additional $9 million in the form of a revolving production loan. A judge ultimately ruled that Inferno pay the $3,427,914.44 shortfall to Cinezeta.

== Reception ==
=== Box office ===
Just Friends earned $9.3 million during its opening over the Thanksgiving weekend in the United States, ranking number six at the box office. It grossed $32.6 million domestically, and $18.4 million in other territories, for a box office total of $51 million.

=== Critical response ===
Just Friends received mixed reviews from critics. On the review aggregator website Rotten Tomatoes, 43% of 108 critics' reviews are positive, with an average rating of 5/10. The website's consensus reads: "There are moments of mirth in this overly broad comedy, but mostly, Just Friends is just not that funny." Metacritic, which uses a weighted average, assigned the film a score of 47 out of 100, based on 28 critics, indicating "mixed or average" reviews. Audiences polled by CinemaScore gave the film an average grade of "B−" on an A+ to F scale.

Roger Ebert was unimpressed by the film, awarding it a one out of four star-rating. Stephen Holden of The New York Times also disliked the film, writing that it "hangs its crude, clobbering sense of humor on a dubious theory. Once a boy and a girl have entered the "friend zone" in a relationship, there's no turning it into sweet romance. Translated into the movie's loutish high school mentality, that means no you-know-what." Stephen Hunter of The Washington Post noted that Faris "[tries] very hard" playing a "a would-be Courtney Love," but felt Smart was "the best thing in the film," before concluding: "Kumble doesn't have great material, but that's okay, because he's not greatly talented. The director lacks the crazed gift for physical comedy that, say, the Farrelly brothers have, and only a few sequences of shtick really work. I like, however, his lack of sentimentality: Instead of idealizing Chris's relationship with an adoring little brother and a vacant mom, Kumble demonizes them, pushing each deep into violent black humor."

The Boston Globe's Ty Burr praised Faris's performance and likened the film to a "low-rent rip-off of There's Something About Mary," noting that it "reminds this '80s survivor of the rambunctious teen comedies directed by Savage Steve Holland and starring the young John Cusack— films such as Better Off Dead and One Crazy Summer. Those weren't art, and neither is this. But they were cheerful and inventive and sloppily assured—and so is this." Helen O'Hara of Empire gave the film a favorable review, praising Reynolds and Faris's performances. Stella Papamichael of BBC also praised Faris's performance, concluding of the film: "It's not subtle—in fact, at times it's plain unwieldy—but Just Friends is still big on laughs.

== See also ==
- List of Christmas films
