= The Last Day of Summer (2007 film) =

- DVD cover
- Genre: Fantasy comedy
- Written by: Kent Pierce
- Directed by: Blair Treu
- Starring: Jansen Panettiere; Denyse Tontz; Daniel Samonas; Jessica Tuck; Alexandra Krosney; Creagen Dow; Eli Vargas; Jon Kent Ethridge; Brendan Miller; Jackee Harry; Jennette McCurdy; Bailee Madison
- Music by: James L. Venable
- Country of origin: United States
- Original language: English

Production
- Executive producers: Jane Startz; Lauren Levine; Marjorie Cohn; Michael Espensen; Bill O'Dowd; Barry Tropp
- Producer: Tina Stern
- Cinematography: Brian Sullivan
- Editor: Matthew Cassel
- Running time: 78 minutes
- Production companies: Dolphin Entertainment; Jane Startz Productions; Nickelodeon Productions

Original release
- Network: Nickelodeon
- Release: July 20, 2007

The Last Day of Summer is a 2007 American fantasy comedy television film directed by Blair Treu and written by Kent Pierce. It aired on Nickelodeon on July 20, 2007.

== Plot ==
Luke Malloy and his friends, A.J. and Riley, perform together as a band named Steel Monkey. They are starting middle school in two days, warned by Luke's older sister Diana of the dangers of junior high (especially the possibility that Luke's friends might leave him behind for the "cooler crowd") and intimidated by the looming presence of the bully, Meat, who constantly threatens incoming sixth graders. Luke dismisses Diana's warnings and the boys sleepover in a tent that night at A.J.'s house.

The following morning, the boys visit a carnival, where Steel Monkey is scheduled to perform in a talent show. Luke embarrasses himself in front of his crush, Alice, and the boys encounter Meat and his friends, who threaten them. They later visit a skate park, where experienced skateboarder Snake advises them about skating. Steel Monkey is nervous about the show, fearing their reputation in middle school is at stake.

Luke wishes the day would never end and that he could do all he wanted with his final day of summer. Immediately afterward, and moments before their band is scheduled to perform onstage at the carnival, he is knocked unconscious by a large wooden board while returning a Frisbee. He awakens in the same tent he woke up in that morning, realizing his wish has sent him back in time. He repeats the day, trying to impress Alice, teach kindness to Meat, and impress Snake, but he is unsuccessful. He tries to avoid the board this time, but it still knocks him out. He is sent back to that morning over and over again moments before Steel Monkey's performance every single day, always getting knocked unconscious by some different, unforeseeable method, such as a football, a skateboard, and even a falling meteor. Every time, he never survives to the talent show.

Luke begins to grow weary of the carnival as the same repeated day grows into weeks, and he starts to spend more time at the skate park, trying to impress Snake and his gang again and again to join their skate group known as "The Pound". Each time, Luke competes against a teenager named Gus who is also trying out for The Pound; Luke consistently embarrasses himself by screwing up the challenge, since the level of skateboarding is far beyond him; in the end, he always ends up returning to the carnival with A.J. and Riley, during which he encounters the bully Meat again and again, always trying different methods of dealing with him. He tries to relate to Meat's home life, but realizes he's making incorrect assumptions which lead Meat and his buddies to chase him down. Other days, Luke simply avoids Meat; once, he even gets revenge on Meat by tying an industrial cord to a porta potty Meat's using, and the other end to a departing truck.

Worrying more about Diana's warning, fearing he may be left behind soon, Luke focuses less on his friends and more on the skate park, where the "cool" people are. He begins to ditch A.J. and Riley every morning, and they always find him later at the park.

After the repeated day has accumulated over several months, Luke finally has developed enough skill that he beats Gus at the Pound tryout, and his friends are shocked when he abandons them to eagerly join the impressed members of the skate group. Diana steps in and tells Snake Luke is too young to join their group, but Snake insists that Luke can never be too young for the three N's: "hangN, rideN, and partyN". Luke, surprised that The Pound is nothing like his real friends and realizing maybe he isn't cut out for the group, returns to the carnival to find them. A.J. and Riley are angry with him for his lies, and blow him off.

The next morning, Luke is gone when A.J. and Riley wake up in the tent. He is sitting on a park bench crying, when Diana shows up and comforts him. Luke swears he's been repeating the same day, and he manages convince a skeptical Diana by taking her to the carnival and pointing out numerous random events before they occur. Diana sympathizes with his situation, telling him she didn't mean to scare him with her warning about friends, but was only teasing him. She tells him that maybe the reason he's stuck is because he needs to change his day for the better; when his crush Alice walks by and says hi to him, Diana smiles at Luke, suggesting he begin there. She encourages him to be ready for the approaching school year and be more confident.

Luke confronts Meat again, this time warning him against bullying, and claiming he'll tell the whole middle school Meat's real name is Melvin if he doesn't start being nicer to people. Confused, Meat agrees, and leaves. He makes a positive effort to communicate with Mr. Molesky, a teacher for the upcoming year whom Luke has previously not done a good job making an impression with over the repeated cycle. He manages to admit his feelings to Alice, and she tells him she's glad they're going to be in class that year.

When Luke and his friends are waiting backstage before the concert, Luke retrieves the Frisbee that resets the cycle. However, nothing happens to him. Luke is taken back by it and after talking to Maxine (who remembers the advice he gave her and implied to be a part of the loop) decides to perform. He makes it to the talent show, and though their introduction is shaky, Diana encourages Luke on; Snake joins in, and soon the crowd is cheering them on. The boys eagerly begin their song, "The Last Day of Summer". Steel Monkey's performance is received warmly. However, right after they finish, Luke is knocked out again, this time by a chipmunk that falls from the top of the stage.

Luke wakes up on the first day of school, but discovers he has to stay home due to his head injury. A.J. and Riley visit Luke after school starts, and Luke looks ahead to middle school the next day.

== Cast ==
- Jansen Panettiere as Luke Malloy, the boy who wished that Labor Day is every day
- Jon Kent Ethridge as A.J. Perkins, Luke's best friend and band member of Steel Monkey
- Eli Vargas as Riley Johnson, Luke's best friend and band member of Steel Monkey
- Alexandra Krosney as Diana Malloy, Luke's snobby older sister
- Denyse Tontz as Alice Keefe, Luke's love crush
- Brendan Miller as Snake, Luke's skateboarding idol who is the leader of a cool group named "The Pound"
- Daniel Samonas as Melvin "Meat", the neighborhood bully who picks on new 6th graders
- Creagen Dow as Gus, Luke's teenage rival who tried to get in with Snake's group but failed
- Jennette McCurdy as Dory Sorenson, Alice's best friend who makes fun of Luke and his friends
- Vince Grant as Frank Malloy, Diana and Luke's father
- Jessica Tuck as Mary Malloy, Diana and Luke's mother
- Sean Whalen as Mr. Molesky, a new middle school teacher
- Vicki Lewis as Paige
- Jackee Harry as Lola the Lobster
- Kayla Henry as Stephanie
- Cody Benjamin Lee as Travis
- Bailee Madison as Maxine
- Lindsey Taylor as Audrey
- Nick Morrison as Crony #1

== Soundtrack ==
- Bowling for Soup – "Greatest Day"
- Cartel – "Say Anything (Else)"
- Holly Lindin – "Summer Sunshine Mix"
- Jive Jones – "Me, Myself and I"
- Erik Hawkins – "Rock Da Beat"
- Steel Monkeys – "The End of Summer"

== DVD ==
The film was released on DVD August 28, 2007, by Sony Pictures Home Entertainment along with Shredderman Rules.

== Reception ==
The film received mixed reviews, gaining a 68% on Rotten Tomatoes.

== See also ==
- List of films featuring time loops
