= Michael Angarano =

American actor (born 1987)

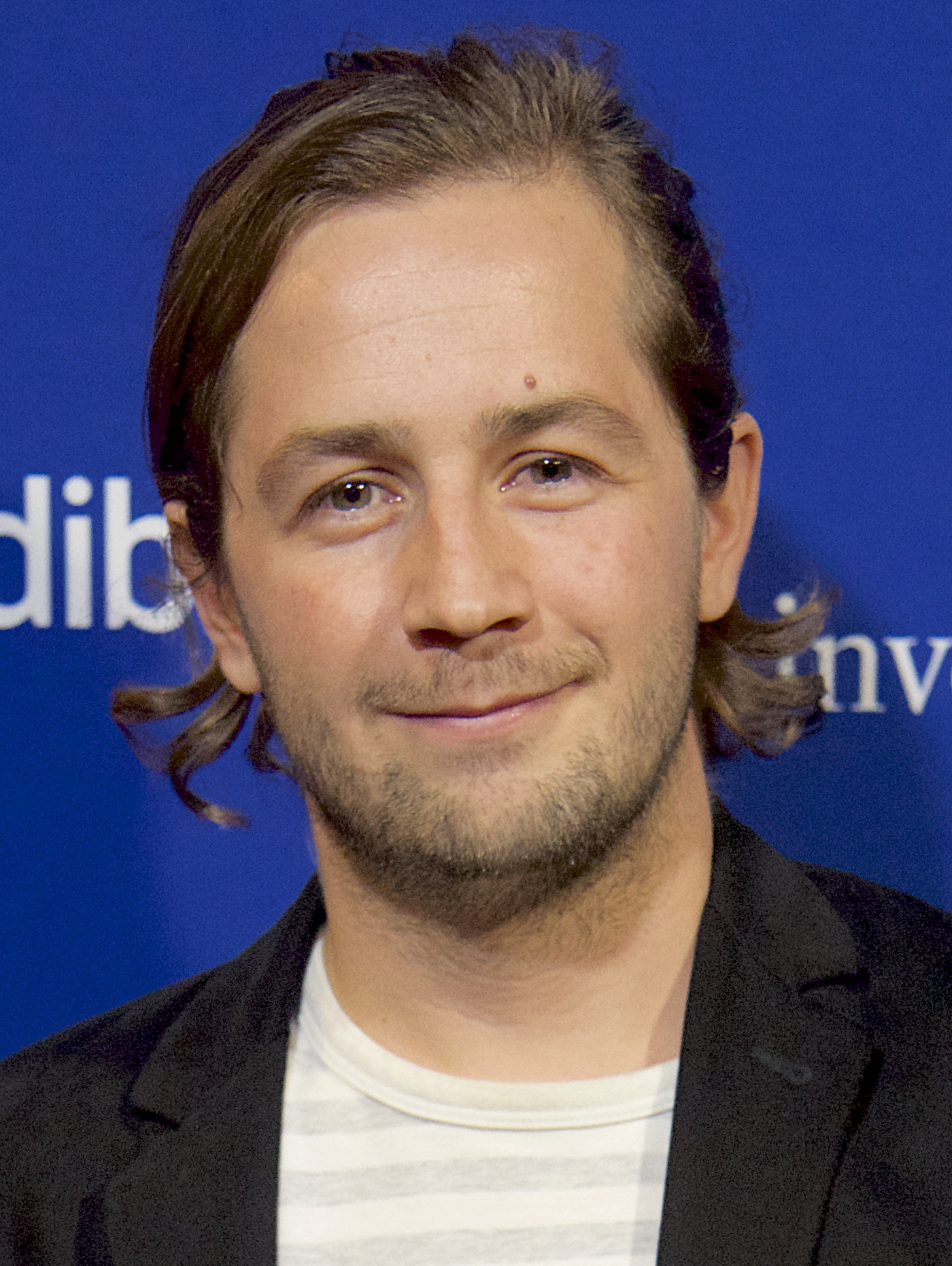
- Angarano in 2017
- Born: Michael Anthony Angarano; December 3, 1987 (age 38); Bensonhurst, Brooklyn, New York City, U.S.
- Education: California State University, Northridge
- Occupation: Actor
- Years active: 1995–present
- Spouse: Maya Erskine (m. 2023)
- Children: 2

Michael Anthony Angarano (born December 3, 1987) is an American actor. He became known for his roles in the film Music of the Heart (1999) and the television series Cover Me (2000–2001), as well as for playing a recurring role as Elliott in the sitcom Will & Grace. Since then he has starred in a number of films including Sky High (2005), Lords of Dogtown (2005), The Forbidden Kingdom (2008), Gentlemen Broncos (2009), Haywire (2011), The English Teacher (2013), Sun Dogs (2017), and Oppenheimer (2023). He has also appeared in the television series I'm Dying Up Here (2017–2018) and This Is Us. The latter earned him a Primetime Emmy Award nomination as an Outstanding Guest Actor in a Drama Series in 2019.

== Early life ==
Angarano was born in Bensonhurst, Brooklyn, New York City, to Michael and Doreen Angarano; he has two sisters and a younger brother. He is of Italian descent.

He was raised in Oakwood, Staten Island before his family moved to California when he was 12. His family owns and operates the dance studio Reflections in Dance in Canoga Park, California. Angarano graduated from Crespi Carmelite High School.

== Career ==
In the late 1990s, Angarano was one of three finalists for the role of young Anakin Skywalker in Star Wars: Episode I – The Phantom Menace, until the creators decided to cast Jake Lloyd in the role.

Angarano played the 11-year-old version of William Miller in Cameron Crowe's semi-autobiographical film Almost Famous in 2000.

In 2000, 12-year-old Angarano acted in Cover Me: Based on the True Life of an FBI Family. The following year, he landed his first major film role in Little Secrets, opposite Evan Rachel Wood and David Gallagher. Three years later, he starred in the Nickelodeon TV-movie Maniac Magee. He played the lead role in 2005's Sky High alongside Kelly Preston, Kurt Russell, Danielle Panabaker, and Mary Elizabeth Winstead. Other film roles include parts in The Bondage, Black Irish, Man in the Chair, Snow Angels, The Final Season, One Last Thing..., The Forbidden Kingdom alongside Jackie Chan and Jet Li, Ceremony, The Brass Teapot, and Red State.

Angarano did not study martial arts before starring in The Forbidden Kingdom with Jackie Chan and Jet Li. Once cast he studied in China for eight hours a day for two weeks with action choreographer Woo-Ping Yuen. Over the seven months of shooting his skills and confidence grew. Angarano's fight scenes were filmed during the last 35 days of shooting.

On television, from 2001 to 2006, he had a recurring role on Will & Grace as Elliott, the son of Jack McFarland, a role he reprised in an episode of the show's 2017 reboot. In 2007, he appeared in four episodes of the show 24 as Scott Wallace, a teenager taken hostage by a terrorist. From 2014 to 2015, he played Dr. Bertram "Bertie" Chickering, Jr. on Cinemax's period drama The Knick. Angarano has also played Eddie Zeidel on the Showtime series I'm Dying Up Here.

== Personal life ==
From 2005 to early 2009, Angarano was in a relationship with American actress Kristen Stewart. He then dated English actress Juno Temple from 2013 to 2016.

In September 2019, he confirmed his relationship with American actress Maya Erskine. On November 2, 2020, the couple revealed that they were engaged and expecting a child. Their son was born in 2021. The duo were married by early 2024. The couple were expecting their second child, a girl. Their daughter was born in 2024.

== Filmography ==
=== Film ===
Year	Title	Role	Notes
1996	Childhood's End	1st Boy	Uncredited
1996	I'm Not Rappaport	3-year-old Cowboy	
1997	For Richer or Poorer	Sammy Yoder	
1998	River Red	Young Tom	
1999	Music of the Heart	Young Nick Tzvaras	
1999	Baby Huey's Great Easter Adventure	Nick	
2000	Almost Famous	Young William Miller	
2000	The Brainiacs.com	Matt Tyler	
2002	Little Secrets	Philip Lenox	
2002	The New Kid	Austin	
2003	Seabiscuit	Young Red Pollard	
2004	The Dust Factory	Rocky Mazzelli	Limited release
2004	Speak	David Petrakis	
2005	Dear Wendy	Freddie	Limited release
2005	Sky High	Will Stronghold	
2005	Lords of Dogtown	Sid	
2006	One Last Thing...	Dylan Jameison	Limited release
2006	The Bondage	Charlie	
2007	The Final Season	Mitch Akers	
2007	Man in the Chair	Cameron Kincaid	
2007	Snow Angels	Arthur Parkinson	
2007	Black Irish	Cole McKay	
2008	The Forbidden Kingdom	Jason Tripitikas	
2009	Gentlemen Broncos	Benjamin Purvis	
2010	Ceremony	Sam Davis	
2011	The Art of Getting By	Dustin Mason	
2011	Red State	Travis	
2011	Noah's Ark: The New Beginning	Townsman	Voice role
2011	Haywire	Scott	
2012	The Brass Teapot	John	
2013	The End of Love	Himself	Cameo
2013	The English Teacher	Jason Sherwood	
2013	Empire State	Eddie	
2015	Wild Card	Cyrus Kinnick	
2015	The Stanford Prison Experiment	Christopher Archer	
2017	Avenues	Max	Also director, writer, and producer
2017	Sun Dogs	Ned Chipley	
2018	In a Relationship	Owen	
2023	Oppenheimer	Robert Serber	
2024	Horizon: An American Saga – Chapter 1	Walter Childs	
2024	Sacramento	Rickey	Also director, writer, and producer

=== Television ===
Year	Title	Role	Notes
1995	Saturday Night Live	David Duchovny's son	Episode: "David Duchovny/Rod Stewart"
1995	New York News		Episode: "Welcome Back Cotter"
1997	Stranger in My Home	Drew	TV movie
1997	Cybill	Timmy	Episode: "The Wedding"
1998	Another World	Steven Frame	Temporary: February 25 and 27, 1998
1998	Grace and Glorie	Bicycle Kid	TV movie
1998	The Pretender	Patrick Harper	Episode: "Stolen"
1999	As the World Turns	Matthew John "M.J." Dixon	
1999	Seven Days	Evan Hamilton	Episode: "For the Children"
2000–2001	Cover Me	Chance Arno	Main cast, 24 episodes
2001	Say Uncle	Nick	TV movie
2001–2006, 2017	Will & Grace	Elliot	Regular season 4; recurring seasons 3, 5–6, 8; special guest season 9 (14 episodes)
2003	Maniac Magee	Jeffrey Lionel Magee	TV movie
2003	My Life with Men	Ben	TV pilot
2003	ER	Zack	Episode: "The Greater Good"
2004	Less than Perfect	George Denton	Episodes: "The Crush", "Claude's 15 Minutes of Christmas"
2005	Summerland	Jeb Ekhart	Episodes: "Leaving Playa Linda", "Where There's a Will There's a Wave"
2005	Kevin Hill	Ethan Claypool	Episode: "Only Sixteen"
2007	24	Scott Wallace	4 episodes
2012	Entry Level	Jake	TV movie
2014–2015	The Knick	Dr. Bertie Chickering, Jr.	Main cast
2014	Drunk History	Walt Disney	Episode: "Hollywood"
2017–2018	I'm Dying Up Here	Eddie Zeidel	Main cast
2017–2018	Mom	Cooper	Episodes: "A Seafaring Ancestor and a Bloomin' Onion", "A Bear and a Bladder Infection"
2018–2021	This Is Us	Nick Pearson	Recurring role, 7 episodes
2019	Dollface	Steve	Episode: "Beauty Queen"
2020	PEN15	Greg	Episodes: "Play" and "Opening Night"
2020	A Teacher	Tinder Date	Episode 9
2022	Minx	Glenn	Main role (season 1)
2022	Angelyne	Danny	Episodes: "Glow in the Dark Queen of the Universe" and "Pink Clouds"
2024	Laid	Richie	Main role
2025	Devil in Disguise: John Wayne Gacy	Sam Amirante	Main role
2026	Margo's Got Money Troubles	Mark Gable	Main cast
