= Michael Steinberg (filmmaker) =

American film director (born 1959)

- Born: 15 May 1959 (age 67); Rapid City, South Dakota, United States
- Occupations: Film and TV director Film and TV producer Film and TV Writer
- Years active: 1992 – present

Michael Steinberg (born 15 May 1959) is a director, writer and producer. He is a graduate of the UCLA School of Theater, Film and Television. He has directed three films that all premiered at the Sundance Film Festival and has written and/or produced four other award-winning features since his debut in 1992. In addition, Steinberg has written, directed, and/or produced several television projects since 2000.

== Selected filmography ==
Year	Film	Role	Notes
1987	Teenage Theater intros for Rhino Video starring Mamie Van Doren	Director	Intros to films in the Teenage Theater anthology from Rhino Video
1988	Nightwatch	Director, writer, producer, editor	Short film
1992	The Waterdance	Director	Won the IFP Spirit Award for "Best First Feature" and the "Audience Award" at the Sundance Film Festival. The film is included in the book "The Best 1000 Films of All Time" published by The New York Times.
1993	Bodies, Rest & Motion	Director	Runner-up for the "Audience Award" at the Sundance Film Festival. It was selected for the "Un Certain Regard" section at the 1993 Cannes Film Festival.
1994	Sleep with Me	Producer, co-writer	Selected as the "Opening Night Gala Premiere" for the Toronto International Film Festival and the "Un Certain Regard" section at the 1994 Cannes Film Festival.
1998	There's Something About Mary	Producer	Steinberg was nominated for a Golden Globe as a producer and the film won an MTV Award for "Best Movie" of the year. The movie is No. 27 on AFI's list of "Greatest American Comedies".
1998	Wicked	Director	Julia Stiles won a "Best Actress" award at the Karlovy Vary International Film Festival and the film was nominated for a Crystal Globe in the Main Competition.
1999	The Caseys	Director, writer, executive producer	Unsold pilot broadcast as a TV movie
2005	The Cave	Co-writer	The Cave was released by Screen Gems on 2,195 screens and has grossed $33,296,457 theatrically.
2008	Hell Ride	Producer	Premiered at the Sundance Film Festival in 2008 under the "Quentin Tarantino Presents" banner. The film is an homage to the original outlaw biker films of the 1960s and 1970s.
