= Adam 'Tex' Davis =

American screenwriter and director

- Born: Bergenfield, New Jersey
- Occupations: Screenwriter, Director, Producer
- Spouse: Kim Davis

Adam "Tex" Davis is an American screenwriter and director. He is most famous for writing the scripts for Spring Break Lawyer and Just Friends.

== Early life and education ==
Davis grew up in Bergenfield, New Jersey and graduated from NYU's Tisch School of the Arts in 1993.

== Career ==
He co-founded the production company Atomic Entertainment with his college roommate Jerry Kolber. The company developed the National Geographic show, Brain Games, and the 2018 Netflix show, Brainchild.

== Filmography ==
- Aloha Santa (Writer, 2016)
- Just Friends (written by / as Adam Davis) 2005
- Spring Break Lawyer (TV movie) (written by) 2001
- Off the Hook (TV movie) (co-cinematographer)1999
- The Eden Myth 1999
- 'Brokers' 1997
- Monster Island (TV movie) 2004
