= Vanessa Zima =

American actress

- Born: December 17, 1986 (age 39); Phillipsburg, New Jersey, U.S.
- Occupation: Actress
- Years active: 1995–present
- Relatives: Madeline Zima (sister); Yvonne Zima (sister)

Vanessa Zima (born December 17, 1986) is an American actress. She is known for her roles as a child actress in the 1990s films The Baby-Sitters Club, Ulee's Gold, and Wicked, and for her recurring role on the first season of the 1995 television legal drama Murder One.

== Early life ==
Zima was born in Phillipsburg, New Jersey, the daughter of Dennis and Marie. Her surname means "winter" in Polish and comes from her maternal grandfather, who was of Polish descent. Actress Yvonne Zima is her sister.

== Career ==
Zima has appeared in films such as The Baby-Sitters Club (1995), Ulee's Gold (1997), Wicked (1998), and The Brainiacs.com (2000). She has also appeared in television series such as Murder One, Family Law, Judging Amy, House, and Scandal.

== Filmography ==
Film roles
Year	Title	Role	Notes
1995	The Baby-Sitters Club	Rosie Wilder	
1997	Ulee's Gold	Penny Jackson	
1998	The Rose Sisters		
1998	Wicked	Inger Christianson	
2000	The Brainiacs.com	Kelly Tyler	
2001	Zoe	Zoe	
2004	Cavedweller	Amanda Windsor	
2006	The Far Side of Jericho	Greta Van Dam	
2011	The Absent	Amy Jones	
2015	The Automatic Hate	Amanda Green	

Television roles
Year	Title	Role	Notes
1995–1996	Murder One	Elizabeth Hoffman	Recurring role (season 1), 9 episodes
1997	Crisis Center	Jenny Maxfield	Episode: "It's a Family Affair"
1997	The Visitor	Melissa	Episode: "Remember"
2000	Family Law	Marie Cameron	Episode: "One Mistake"
2004	Judging Amy	Katie Hadlock	Episode: "Werewolves of Hartford"
2008	House	Becca	Episode: "Joy"
2012	Scandal	Jill	Episode: "The Other Woman"
2016	Killing Mommy	Becky	Television film

== Awards and nominations ==
In 1998, Zima was nominated for a Young Artist Award for Best Performance in a Feature Film: Supporting Young Actress for Ulee's Gold (1997); the award was won by her co-star in the film, Jessica Biel.
