= Kyle Howard =

American actor

- Born: April 13, 1978 (age 48)
- Occupation: Actor
- Years active: 1996–present

Kyle Howard (born April 13, 1978) is an American actor.

== Early life ==
Howard grew up in Loveland, Colorado. He has worked in both film and television. His film career includes House Arrest alongside Jamie Lee Curtis, Skeletons with Ron Silver, Orange County and The Paper Brigade. His work includes a Coca-Cola commercial with talking ice cubes that are anxious to be bathed in cola.

== Career ==
=== Acting ===
Howard played Bobby Newman on the TBS original series My Boys. Howard's previous television work includes Love Boat: The Next Wave, Related, Grosse Pointe, and Run of the House. He has also guest-starred in CSI, Home Improvement, Chicago Hope, What I Like About You, The Drew Carey Show, Numbers, 8 Simple Rules, Friends, Nip/Tuck, Ghost Whisperer and Don't Trust the B— in Apartment 23. He played the character Dickey in Baby Geniuses in 1999.

Howard starred alongside Milo Ventimiglia and Chris Evans as one of three boys in an all-girls school in Opposite Sex on Fox's summer 2000 schedule. The show was canceled after 8 episodes.

In May 2010, NBC announced that Howard would star in the upcoming television series Perfect Couples. The half-hour romantic comedy was expected to premiere for the 2010–11 television season. However, on July 1, 2010, Deadline.com reported that Kyle Bornheimer had replaced Kyle Howard as Dave because of uncertainty about whether the actor would be available due to TBS' decision to see how the fourth season of My Boys performed before it was renewed or canceled. It was canceled two months later.

From 2011 to 2016, Howard played the recurring character Dr. Paul Van Dyke on Royal Pains. In 2015, Howard began playing the starring role of Oliver in Your Family or Mine.

In 2020, Howard played Budd Skriff in Upside-Down Magic.

== Personal life ==
In 2008, Howard began dating reality star Lauren Conrad. Howard expressed concern that appearing on reality television would interfere with his acting career; consequently, their relationship was not documented on The Hills. After three years together, Howard and Conrad ended their relationship in 2011.

== Filmography ==
=== Film ===
Year	Title	Role
1996	House Arrest	Gregory Alan "Grover" Beindorf
1996	The Paper Brigade	Gunther Wheeler
1997	Robo Warriors	Zach Douglas
1997	Address Unknown	Matt Kester
1999	Baby Geniuses	Dickie
1999	Sign of the Times	Drive-thru clerk
1999	Townies	Tuffy
2002	Orange County	Arlo
2003	Easy Six	J.P. Stallman
2007	Holiday in Handcuffs	Jake Chandler
2008	Extreme Movie	Boyfriend
2009	Made for Each Other	Ed
2014	All Stars	Brad Twersky
2015	Bad Roomies	Smith
2018	Miss Arizona	Rick
2018	Electric Love	William

=== Television ===
Year	Title	Role	Notes
1997	Chicago Hope	Alexander Verdulyak	Episode: "Split Decisions"
1997	Skeletons	Zach Crane	Television film
1997	Home Improvement	Greg Clark	Episode: "Pump You Up"
1998	Pacific Blue	Josh Timmons	Episode: "Armed and Dangerous"
1998–1999	Love Boat: The Next Wave	Danny Kennedy	Main cast
2000	Opposite Sex	Philip Steffan	Main cast
2000–2001	Grosse Pointe	Dave "The Stand-In" May	Main cast
2000	Yesterday's Children	Kevin Cole	Television film
2001	Friends	Alan Lewis	Episode: "The One with Joey's Award"
2001–2002	Boston Public	Ferris Kaplan	3 episodes
2002	Providence	Aidan Green	3 episodes
2002–2003	The Drew Carey Show	Evan	14 episodes (1 uncredited)
2003	What I Like About You	Evan	2 episodes (1 uncredited)
2003	King of the Hill	Steve (voice)	Episode: "Vision Quest"
2003–2004	Run of the House	Chris Franklin	Main cast
2005	8 Simple Rules	Bruno	Episode: "Closure"
2005	The Bad Girl's Guide	Damian	Episode: "The Guide to Being in the Mood"
2005	Nip/Tuck	Kevin Miller	Episode: "Derek, Alex, and Gary"
2005–2006	Related	Joel	14 episodes (2 uncredited)
2006	CSI: Crime Scene Investigation	Jeff Powell	Episode: "Time of Your Death"
2006–2010	My Boys	Bobby Newman	Main cast
2007	Numbers	Jason Aronow	Episode: "Burn Rate"
2007	Holiday in Handcuffs	Jake Chandler	Television film
2008	Ghost Whisperer	Travis Ackerman	Episode: "Pieces of You"
2011	Love Bites	Carter	Episode: "Firsts"
2011–2016	Royal Pains	Dr. Paul Van Dyke	16 episodes
2013	Don't Trust the B— in Apartment 23	Daniel	Episode: "Dating Games..."
2014	Friends with Better Lives	Tom	Episode: "Yummy Mummy"
2015	Your Family or Mine	Oliver Weston	Main cast
2015	Minority Report	Mark Massero	Episode: "Hawk-Eye"
2018-2021	Into the Dark	Ted Fips	Episode: "A Nasty Piece of Work"
2020	Upside-Down Magic	Budd Skriff	Television film
