= Wicked (1998 film) =

American thriller film by Michael Steinberg

- DVD cover
- Directed by: Michael Steinberg
- Written by: Eric Weiss
- Produced by: Frank Beddor
- Starring: Julia Stiles; Michael Parks; William R. Moses
- Cinematography: Bernd Heinl
- Edited by: Daniel Gross
- Music by: Cliff Martinez
- Distributed by: Columbia TriStar Home Video
- Release date: December 17, 1998
- Running time: 85 minutes
- Country: United States
- Language: English

Wicked is a 1998 American thriller film directed by Michael Steinberg and starring Julia Stiles as a disturbed teenage girl. The film also stars Michael Parks and William R. Moses. The film debuted at the 1998 Sundance Film Festival but had a delayed release due to a financial dispute between a producer and the studio. The film was released on DVD in 2001.

== Plot ==
Fourteen-year-old Ellie Christianson lives in an affluent neighborhood with her parents, Karen and Ben, and younger sister, Inger. Beneath their privileged life-style is one tinged with dysfunction and chaos. Ben is a workaholic with a hectic schedule that keeps him away from home for most of the day but he's carrying on an affair with the housekeeper, Lena. Karen, meanwhile, passes the time by pursuing an illicit love affair with the family's next-door neighbor, Lawson Smith, while her daughters are getting ready for school. Karen plans to leave her husband and take the girls so she fires Lena as a means to begin her getaway. She is completely unaware that Ellie has secretly witnessed one of her liaisons with Lawson.

Karen has an ongoing tumultuous relationship with Ellie, culminating in a heated confrontation one day after Ellie disobeys an order to not wear too much make-up at school. After Karen is found dead, having been brutally bludgeoned to death, Ellie begins to assume Karen's wifely duties to Ben around the house and to pursue an unhealthy relationship with him.

Eventually, Lena complains that she needs her green card, so her relationship with Ben is brought to light and eventually they marry. The impromptu wedding ceremony ignites feelings of jealousy for Ellie as she wanted to be his wife all along.

While the supposed love triangle is playing out in Ellie's mind, her mother's tragic "accident" is investigated by Detective Boland. When Karen's death is subsequently ruled to be murder, he names Ellie as the prime suspect. During the wedding celebrations, Ellie gets drunk and is found by Lawson who takes her to his house, washes her hair and lets her sleep. While talking, they decide to run away together. When Ellie wakes up, she decides to go home after she hears the police officer at Lawson's door saying he's going to come back with a warrant. Lawson tells her they'll meet at 8 a.m. to leave.

Meanwhile, her sister Inger finds the weapon that killed their mother in Ellie’s closet, a drama mask, and replaces it in its hiding place.

Ellie walks in and goes straight to her room, ignoring all the people asking where she has been. She goes to her room and Lena tells her dad to go reprimand her. When he goes to the room and tries to, Ellie threatens him with telling everyone what happened between them. He crumbles and she makes him break up with Lena.

The next morning Ellie tells her dad she's not going to school and he doesn't fight it. Her sister makes a comment that implies Ellie's guilt and tells her she is leaving for school. Ellie then goes upstairs and starts packing her bag to meet Lawson. She hears a crash downstairs and is scared, but goes to see who it was. An unseen assailant attacks and bludgeons her to death, apparently in the same manner that her mother was killed. Lawson comes in, finds Ellie dead and picks her up while crying. The detective comes in, sees Lawson holding Ellie and shoots him in his back. The police assume Lawson was responsible for everything and Ben and Inger move into Lena's apartment. Inger is crying for her father and when he goes to comfort her, Lena notices Inger's bookbag. When she opens it she finds the mask, covered in blood, that killed Ellie. The camera focuses in on Inger's face, which is cold and unemotional, as she leers back at Lena, implying that Lena may be her next target.

== Cast ==
- Julia Stiles as Ellie Christianson
- Michael Parks as Detective Boland
- William R. Moses as Ben Christianson
- Chelsea Field as Karen Christianson
- Vanessa Zima as Inger Christianson
- Louise Myrback as Lena Anderson
- Patrick Muldoon as Lawson Smith
- Linda Hart as Mrs. Potter
- Casey Rion as Leon

== Production ==
Director Michael Steinberg considered actresses like Rachael Leigh Cook and Katie Holmes for the role of Ellie. Julia Stiles, who was then 15, won the role when she faxed a letter to Steinberg in which she gave an interesting take on the character.

== Release ==
Wicked debuted at the Sundance Film Festival in January 1998. Prior to its Sundance premiere, the film was initially picked up by Paramount for theatrical release to three hundred theaters nationwide in October 1998, but the studio backed out during final negotiations. At Sundance, though the film generated buzz, with Stiles being described as "the darling of the festival" by press outlets, the film was not able to secure any distribution deals. A dispute over the film’s score by Cliff Martinez and the final cut kept it on the shelf for another year and a half before Columbia TriStar picked up the film for video release. By that time, Stiles had gone on to star in 10 Things I Hate About You and Save the Last Dance. Wicked was finally released on video and DVD in August 2001.

== Reception ==
On review aggregate website Rotten Tomatoes, Wicked has an approval rating of 20% based on 5 reviews.

In a positive review, Glenn Lovell of Variety wrote the film is "chockablock with nods to Lynch and early De Palma" and called it "a stylish, dandy nail biter." Of Stiles, Lovell wrote, "the young actress is more than up to the task, segueing from surly, troubled teen to garishly dolled up seductress, then back again." Lovell cited the film's "formulaic script, which tips us to identity of the killer too soon", as one of the drawbacks.

Stiles won the award for Best Actress at the 1998 Karlovy Vary International Film Festival.

== See also ==
- Electra complex
