= Spring Break Lawyer =

2001 film directed by Alan Cohn

- Poster
- Written by: Adam 'Tex' Davis
- Directed by: Alan Cohn
- Starring: Brad Raider; Busy Philipps; Sean Murray; Travis Wester; Adrienne Barbeau
- Music by: Roger Neill
- Country of origin: United States
- Original language: English

Production
- Producer: Roee Sharon
- Cinematography: Feliks Parnell
- Editor: Marcelo Sansevieri
- Running time: 82 min.
- Production companies: Karz Entertainment; Paramount Network Television

Original release
- Network: MTV
- Release: March 23, 2001

Spring Break Lawyer is a 2001 American made-for-TV comedy film, starring Brad Raider, Busy Philipps and Sean Murray. It was written by Adam 'Tex' Davis and directed by Alan Cohn. The film was first aired at MTV on March 23, 2001.

== Plot ==
Jay Garvey (Brad Raider) is kicked out of law school for a prank involving a cadaver; his friend and erstwhile caretaker of said cadaver, Nick (Sean Murray), is correspondingly kicked out of medical school. They travel to Florida during spring break and together help fraudulently secure acquittals for partygoers accused of drunken crimes with the help of forged doctor's notes. Senator Claxton (Gary Grubbs) seeks to crack down on drunken misbehavior and participates in the railroading of Leon, an innocent defendant. Meanwhile, Jay and Nick are jailed for petty crimes. Through careful maneuvering, Jay manages to exonerate himself, Nick, and Leon.

== Cast ==
- Brad Raider as Jay Garvey
- Busy Philipps as Jenny
- Sean Murray as Nick Kepper
- Travis Wester as Leon Hornberger
- Adrienne Barbeau as Judge Stern

== Reception ==
Robert Pardi of TV Guide gave the film only one star out of five and wrote: "College kids whose brains have been fried by too much the sun are clearly the target audience for this screwed-up escapade, which is undermined by an excess of testosterone and a juvenile obsession with flatulence."
