= Daniel Samonas =

Canadian actor

- Born: March 7, 1990 (age 35); Toronto, Ontario, Canada
- Occupation: Actor
- Years active: 2004–present

Daniel Nicholas Patrick Samonas (born March 7, 1990) is a Canadian American actor best known for his roles as Dean Moriarty on Wizards of Waverly Place and as Toder on iCarly.

== Background ==
Born in Toronto, Ontario, Samonas is of Greek, and Irish descent, and moved to Coral Springs, Florida with his family when he was 11. There he did print modeling and became active in film. He currently resides in Los Angeles, California.

== Career ==
After moving to Florida when he was 11, Samonas became involved in print modeling and local theater. His first lead role was in Ephraim, after which he served in several more films until his first television spot in Everybody Hates Chris. He returned to film and in 2006 was cast in the ABC pilot Enemies. This was followed by appearances in Zoey 101, Hannah Montana as Josh and repeated appearances as the voice of Teo in Avatar: The Last Airbender. In 2006 he was cast as 'Meat' in The Last Day of Summer. In 2008, Samonas made an appearance on iCarly as Freddie's fencing rival Doug Toder and later appeared on Disney Channel's Wizards of Waverly Place as Alex's (Selena Gomez) boyfriend Dean.

== Filmography ==
Year	Title	Role	Notes
2012	Destiny Road	Johnny	Film
2012	Final Fantasy XIII-2	Maqui	VG
2011	Fishers of Men		Film
2010	Final Fantasy XIII	Maqui	VG; Voice Actor (English version)
2009	Downstream		
2009	Coach Shane		
2009	Nickelodeon Kids' Choice Awards		TV
2008	The Least of These		
2007	Nickelodeon: 'The Last Day of Summer' - Behind the Scenes		TV
2008–2010	Wizards of Waverly Place	Dean Moriarty	TV; 9 episodes
2007–2008	Entourage		TV; 3 episodes
2007	iCarly	Doug Toder	Episode: "iFence"
2008	CSI: NY		TV
2008	Without a Trace		TV
2005–2008	Avatar: The Last Airbender	Teo	TV; Voice Actor; 4 episodes
2007	ER	Finn Andrews	TV
2007	The Last Day of Summer	Meat	TV
2006	Stronger Than Daylight		
2006	Thanks to Gravity		
2006	My Struggle		
2006	Zoey 101	Student	TV Episode:Broadcast Views
2006	Everybody Hates Chris	Ernie D	TV; Season 1, Episode 3
2006	Hannah Montana	Josh	TV; Season 1 Episode 4
2006	Enemies		
2005	3 the Hard Way		
2005	Hitters Anonymous		
2005	La migra		
2005	Little Men		
2004	Pizza Palace		
2004	Ephraim		
