= House Arrest (1996 film) =

American comedy film

- Theatrical release poster
- Directed by: Harry Winer
- Written by: Michael Hitchcock
- Produced by: Harry Winer; Judith A. Polone
- Starring: Jamie Lee Curtis; Kevin Pollak; Jennifer Tilly; Christopher McDonald; Wallace Shawn; Ray Walston
- Cinematography: Ueli Steiger
- Edited by: Ronald Roose
- Music by: Bruce Broughton
- Production company: Rysher Entertainment
- Distributed by: Metro-Goldwyn-Mayer
- Release date: August 14, 1996
- Running time: 108 minutes
- Country: United States
- Language: English
- Budget: $5 million
- Box office: $7,032,782

House Arrest is a 1996 American comedy film directed by Harry Winer, written by Michael Hitchcock, and starring Jamie Lee Curtis, Kevin Pollak, Jennifer Tilly, Christopher McDonald, Wallace Shawn, and Ray Walston, with Kyle Howard, Amy Sakasitz, Mooky Arizona, Russel Harper, and an up-and-coming Jennifer Love Hewitt in supporting roles. It tells the story of two children who lock their parents in the basement upon their plans for a separation as the other children they know get involved by locking their respective problem parents in there as well.

The film was produced by Rysher Entertainment and released by Metro-Goldwyn-Mayer on August 14, 1996, and went on to gross just over $7 million at the box office. It was panned by critics.

The film was shot at various locations in the U.S. states of California and Ohio. Monrovia, California was the location for several exterior house scenes while most interior shots were done at the CBS/Radford lot in Studio City, California. The story was set in Defiance, Ohio, although Chagrin Falls, Ohio actually doubled for it.

== Plot ==
The Beindorf family, consisting of Ned, Janet, Grover, and Stacy, live a supposedly happy typical family life in the suburbs of Defiance, Ohio. In fact, Ned and Janet are not happy and are separating, although they tell Grover and Stacy it is not a divorce.

Grover and Stacy first try to recreate Ned and Janet's honeymoon in Hawaii in the basement, but this fails to bring any happiness into their relationship. Grover and Stacy then leave the basement, telling Ned and Janet they must get another surprise for them upstairs. They go up, close the door, and nail it shut. They vow to keep it so until Ned and Janet work out their problems and get their marriage back on its feet.

The next day, Grover tells his best friend, Matt Finley, what he has done and T.J. Krupp, the wealthy local bully, overhears them. Matt goes over to the Beindorfs' house to look at Grover and Stacy's work and is impressed. T.J. shows up to have a look and actually installs a newer, more secure door to keep Ned and Janet trapped inside.

T.J. and Matt then leave to collect their parents and bring them there to lock them up as well. Matt's father, Vic, never keeps a wife for more than two years and is on his latest one, Louise. T.J.'s father, Donald, does not treat his wife, Gwenna, well.

Matt also brings his bulldog, Cosmo, and two younger brothers, Jimmy and Teddy, who come armed with sleeping bags and T.J. brings his boa constrictor, Spot. When Grover asks what is going on in response to his friends setting up camp at his house, T.J. says, "Our parents could be down there for months!"

Ned and Janet almost talk Grover into letting them out, but Donald threatens him with legal action. Grover finds out that his crush, Brooke Figler, is also having parental problems: her mother, Cindy, acts awkward, going so far as to trying to hang out with her friends. Grover invites her to lock Cindy up with the rest.

The children begin to help their parents solve their problems. They try to find a way out of the basement while getting along and seeing what each of their problems are. The children also work out their differences with each other above. They eventually give in and up to the police led by Chief Rocco. Their parents are set free.

Some time later, Ned and Janet reconcile and took a second honeymoon to Hawaii. Vic and Louise's marriage lasts past the two-year mark and they are expecting another child. Donald and Gwenna get divorced, though she later goes back to law school and they open up a law firm together. Cindy starts dating other guys instead of intruding on Brooke's dates. Also, Grover and Brooke became a couple and she passionately kisses him in front of their classmates at school. He concludes that if Ned and Janet ever try to get divorced again, he might think of locking them in the attic.

== Cast ==
- Kyle Howard as Grover Beindorf, Ned and Janet's son who does his version of house arrest on them.
- Jamie Lee Curtis as Janet Beindorf, the matriarch of the Beindorf family.
- Kevin Pollak as Ned Beindorf, the patriarch of the Beindorf family.
- Amy Sakasitz as Stacy Beindorf, Grover's younger sister who assists him in his plot.
- Jennifer Love Hewitt as Brooke Figler, Grover's crush.
- Jennifer Tilly as Cindy Figler, Brooke's mother who tries to hang out with her and her friends while acting like a teenager.
- Mooky Arizona as Matt Finley, Grover's best friend.
- Wallace Shawn as Vic Finley, Matt's father who can't hold onto a wife for more than two years.
- Caroline Aaron as Louise Finley, Vic's latest wife and Matt's stepmother.
- Alex Seltz as Jimmy Finley, Matt's younger brother.
- Josh Wolford as Teddy Finley, Matt's younger brother.
- Herbert Russell (as Russel Harper) as T.J. Krupp, a wealthy bully who later assists Grover in his plot.
- Christopher McDonald as Donald Krupp, T.J.'s father who works as an attorney.
- Sheila McCarthy as Gwenna Krupp, T.J.'s mother who is not treated well by Donald.
- Ray Walston as Chief Rocco, an elderly, retired chief of police in Defiance, Ohio.
- Colleen Camp as Mrs. Burtis
- K. Todd Freeman as Officer Davis
- Daniel Roebuck as Officer Brickowski
- Ben Stein as Ralph Doyle
- Patrika Darbo as Cafeteria cashier
- Michael Hitchcock as Cop

== Reception ==
=== Critical response ===
The film received negative reviews from critics. On Rotten Tomatoes it has an approval rating of 10% based on 30 reviews. The site's consensus states: "Constructed out of cliches, thinly written characters, and fundamental misunderstandings of human nature, House Arrest is a dull (and borderline irresponsible) waste of a talented cast." Audiences surveyed by CinemaScore gave it a grade "B+" on scale of A to F.

Gene Siskel of the Chicago Tribune gave the film 0 out of 4 and called the film: "One of the year's worst movies...at least I hope so, or it's going to be a very bad year." Joe Leydon of Variety magazine called it "A tepid and repetitious comedy."

=== Awards ===
- Young Artist Awards
  - Best Performance in a Feature Film – Leading Young Actor – Kyle Howard (nominated)
  - Best Song – Too Good To Wake From – Zendetta (nominated)
  - Best Score – Midville USA – Bruce Broughton (nominated)
