= Blair Treu =

American film director

- Born: January 1, 1957; Philadelphia, Pennsylvania United States
- Occupation(s): Screenwriter, film director and producer
- Years active: 1977–present

Blair Treu is an American film director. He directed Little Secrets and Wish Upon a Star. More recently he has teamed up with Brigham Young University (BYU) professor Stephen F. Duncan, KBYU-TV and BYU TV to create Real Families, Real Answers. He was also a codirector of BYUtv's Granite Flats. He graduated from BYU with a bachelor's degree in theatre in 1985.

== Career ==
Treu is the writer and director of Meet the Mormons, a feature-length documentary produced by the Church of Jesus Christ of Latter-day Saints (LDS Church) that was released October 10, 2014. He previously directed Called to Serve, a film about LDS Church missionaries, created with the same general format, in about 1985.

Treu's work includes directing feature films, television, documentaries, and commercials for over 30 years, working work with a number of academy and Emmy award-winning actors. He began his career at the Walt Disney Company as an assistant to Marty Katz, senior vice president of Television/Feature Production. A year later, Treu ventured into script development where he supervised script coverage for the ABC Disney Sunday Movie until 1987. Six years later, after directing a string of documentaries and commercials, his feature directorial debut came in 1993 with Just Like Dad, starring Wallace Shawn and Nick Cassavetes. This would be the first of three films created for the Disney Channel, along with The Paper Brigade (with Kyle Howard and Robert Englund) and Wish Upon a Star (with Katherine Heigl).

Treu later directed 18 episodes of Chicken Soup for the Soul, a TV series based on the popular books. These episodes included Shelley Long, Paula Abdul, Edward Asner, Stacy Keach, Sheena Easton, Ernest Borgnine, Ray Walston, and Andrew Dice Clay. Simultaneous to that series, Treu directed The Brainiacs.com (with Dom DeLuise and Rich Little) and Phantom of the Megaplex (with Mickey Rooney). From 2000 to 2007, Treu produced and directed Little Secrets (with Evan Rachel Wood and Vivica A. Fox) for Columbia Tri-star Pictures and The Last Day of Summer for Nickelodeon Television. He also directed 22 episodes of Power Rangers and 2 episodes of the live-action series, Teenage Mutant Ninja Turtles.

Treu has also produced and directed numerous educational films and documentaries, such as two 90-minute TV specials Bridge to China and Full Circle. He also served as show-runner/director on the 13-part series Real Families, Real Answers. More recently, Treu directed an episode of the scripted series Granite Flats (with Christopher Lloyd and Parker Posey).

== Filmography ==
- 1995 — Just Like Dad — Director
- 1996 — The Paper Brigade — Director
- 1996 — Wish Upon a Star — Director
- 2000 — The Brainiacs.com — Director
- 2000 — Phantom of the Megaplex — Director
- 2001 — Little Secrets — Director
- 2007 — The Last Day of Summer — Director
- 2014 — Meet the Mormons — Director
- 2014 — "Glorious" (David Archuleta music video) — Director
