= Wish Upon a Star =

1996 television film directed by Blair Treu

- DVD cover
- Genre: Comedy; Family; Fantasy
- Written by: Jessica Barondes
- Directed by: Blair Treu
- Starring: Katherine Heigl; Danielle Harris; Don Jeffcoat; Scott Wilkinson; Lois Chiles
- Music by: Ray Colcord; Moonpools & Caterpillars
- Country of origin: United States
- Original language: English

Production
- Executive producer: H.E. Scruggs
- Producers: David C. Anderson; Don Schain
- Production location: West Valley City, Utah
- Cinematography: Brian Sullivan
- Editor: David Blangsted
- Running time: 89 minutes
- Production company: Leucadia Film Corporation

Original release
- Network: The Disney Channel
- Release: October 12, 1996

Wish Upon a Star is a 1996 American fantasy comedy-drama television film directed by Blair Treu, written by Jessica Barondes, and starring Katherine Heigl and Danielle Harris. The film focuses on two teenage sisters who magically swap bodies after wishing on a shooting star. The tagline of the film is "I Wish I May, I Wish I Might, Become My Sister For A Night!".

== Plot ==
Alexia and Hayley Wheaton are portrayed as sisters who live in the same house and attend the same high school. Eighteen-year-old Alexia is popular, stylish, has a jock boyfriend, Kyle, and puts no effort into schoolwork. In contrast, her fifteen-year-old sister Hayley is socially reserved and admires her older sister's popularity from a distance, while excelling in science and mathematics. The sisters do not get along; Hayley resents her reliance on Alexia, who is frequently late for a ride to school, and Alexia prefers not to be seen with her less-than-cool younger sister. Hayley has a crush on her sister's boyfriend, Kyle, and envies her when she sees them making out.

One night, Hayley is seen outside studying the night sky for her science class while Alexia is relaxing in the outdoor hot tub with Kyle. When Hayley sees a shooting star, she wishes to become Alexia, then turns to see Alexia also watching the sky. The next morning, the sisters each awaken to find themselves in each other's bodies. Hayley takes responsibility for the swap, mentioning her wish.

Discovering they are unable to swap back, Hayley is content to fill her sister's role for the day, as she can now experience the glamour of Alexia's life firsthand. However, their experience sours: as Alexia, Hayley discovers how poorly Alexia's friends treat the unpopular kids at school, including her best friend Caitlin. She learns that Alexia has been planning to break up with Kyle due to her friends' self-imposed rules. To get out of taking a test, Alexia faints and is taken home from school by their mother. Meanwhile, Hayley (as Alexia) apologizes to Kyle after learning that Alexia had broken up with him the previous night, and they make out.

By the end of their first day, the sisters realize they may be stuck in their altered states. Alexia gets upset when she sees a hickey on her old body, chipped her polished nails and realizes that "she" is back with Kyle. They each spend the next day purposely sabotaging each other's lives. Hayley (in Alexia's body) wears the same outfit that she had worn the day before, and Alexia (in Hayley's body) goes to school dressed up as a dominatrix. Alexia (as Hayley) dances on a table in the cafeteria miming explicit rock songs and Hayley (as Alexia) roughly grabs and makes out with Kyle in retaliation. Eventually, as Hayley and Alexia each become accustomed to the other's life, they begin to relate to one another better, and the swap eventually brings them closer as sisters.

While spending an evening outside searching for a shooting star to make their wish to switch back, they decide to spend one more day as each other. Hayley's task (in Alexia's body) is to convince her teachers that Alexia is not an "airhead," and Alexia (in Hayley's body) is to show Hayley how easily she can get a guy. Kyle starts to appreciate Alexia's new approach to life, wearing less makeup and caring less about clothes. He tells her he loves her, and Hayley (as Alexia) dismisses him, as she knows she will never be with him. The sisters’ plans work, and they both decide to switch back. Unfortunately, that night, they fall asleep early. Hayley wakes up in time to wish on a star. When she awakens the next morning, she finds that they didn't switch back and believes that they will never be able to return to their bodies, but does not tell Alexia. The next day, Kyle breaks up with Hayley (as Alexia).

Alexia and Hayley attend the Winter Festival dance. On the pool bleachers, Hayley breaks down and tells Alexia that they cannot switch back. Alexia then confesses that she also saw the star when she was with Kyle and wished to become Hayley. In tears, Alexia confesses that she was bored with her life and that she had been jealous of Hayley's intellect and well-structured future plans. She reveals that on her first day as Hayley, she had discovered the daily bullying from their classmates that her sister and the other unpopular kids suffered through. From that moment on, Alexia regrets her past mistreatment of everyone. She mentions that she realized that her friends are shallow, that because of self-imposed rules she'd have to dump Kyle, and that she had no chance of getting into college due to her underachievement. Alexia then mentions that with her intellect and planning, Hayley would never make Alexia's mistakes.

Realizing that it was their simultaneous wish that caused the switch, Alexia and Hayley sit outside, and when they see a shooting star, together they wish to be themselves again. They open their eyes back in their own bodies. Hayley worries that it will be hard for her to remain neat and clean, but Alexia reassures her that she will have help. They then return to the Winter Festival. Alexia apologizes to Kyle, they kiss, and Alexia is crowned queen. Her friends apologize for their earlier behavior and decide to throw out the rules and remain friends. Alexia then dances on stage with her boyfriend, while Hayley finds their new neighbor Simon and dances with him.

== Cast ==
- Katherine Heigl as Alexia Wheaton, the older sister
- Danielle Harris as Hayley Wheaton, the younger sister
- Don Jeffcoat as Kyle Harding, Alexia's boyfriend
- Scott Wilkinson as Benjamin "Ben" Wheaton
- Mary Parker Williams as Nan Wheaton
- Lois Chiles as Principal Mary Mittermiller
- Ivey Lloyd as Caitlin Sheinbaum, Hayley's friend.
- Matt Barker as Simon, the new neighbor of the Wheaton family and Hayley's love interest.
- Jacque Gray as Kazumi, Alexia's friend.
- Kari White as Talley, Alexia's friend.
- January Sorensen as Sabrina, Alexia's friend.

== Production ==
Wish Upon a Star was filmed at Hunter High School in West Valley City, Utah. The film was shot in 1995 and early 1996. In the movie, the real Hunter High basketball team played the opposing team, the Wolverines, in the basketball game. The band Moonpools & Caterpillars are featured at the Winter Festival Dance.

== Reception ==
The film received a positive rating from FoxWeekly, who gave the film an 8 out of 10. The film has attained a cult following as it aired repeatedly on the Disney Channel.

== Home media ==
The film was released on VHS by Warner Home Video in 1997, and a DVD version was released in 2001. It was also reissued for DVD in 2018 by Samuel Goldwyn Films.

On June 13th 2026, the movie was added to the Disney+ streaming service.

== See also ==
- Body swap appearances in media
